= List of Group CN sports cars =

The following is a list of Group CN sports cars that have competed in races in the past.

Brand	Chassis	Image	Year
ADR	03		???
AGM	WLR		???
AJEC	01		???
Aquila	CR1		2008
BDN	S3		???
Bicknell	PS7		2007
Caterham	SP/300.R		2011
Chiron	LMP3 CN		2008
Funyo	4		2008
Funyo	5		2011
Funyo	7		2009
Gibson	CN2012		2012
Juno	SS1		2001
Juno	SS2		2003
Juno	SS3-V6		2005
Juno	SSE		2008
Juno	CN2011		2011
Juno	CN2012		2012
Ligier	JS49		2004
Ligier	JS51		2008
Ligier	JS53		2012
Ligier	JS53 Evo		2013
Ligier	JS53 Evo 2		2014
Ligier	JS55		2014
Lucchini	P1-98		
Lucchini	P2		1992
Merlin	MP23		???
Norma	M7		1991
Norma	M11		1994
Norma	M16		1996
Norma	M17		1998
Norma	M18		1999
Norma	M20		2003
Norma	M20F		2007
Norma	M20-FC		2011
Osella	PA9/90		1992
Osella	PA18		1992
Osella	PA20		1993
Osella	PA21		2001
Osella	PA21 Evo		2013
Osella	PA21 Junior		2004
Osella	PA21/S		2004
PRC	Pedrazza		???
PRC	WPR60		2014
Radical	SR1		2013
Radical	SR3		2002
Radical	SR3 RS		2002
Radical	SR3 SL		2002
Radical	SR5		2007
Radical	SR8 RX		2011
Sport Drive	SDR 09		2009
Tiga	CN12A		2012
Tiga	CN12B		2012
Tatuus	PY012		2012
WFR	CN		???
Wolf Racing Cars	GB08		2009
