= 2023 Prototype Challenge =

Seventh season of the Prototype Challenge

The 2023 Prototype Challenge powered by Pirelli was the seventh season of the Prototype Challenge. It began at Circuit Zandvoort 14 April and concluded at TT Circuit Assen on 29 October.

== Calendar ==
Round	Circuit	Date	Event	Notes
1	Circuit Zandvoort, Netherlands	14–16 April	Spring Races	All races contested with Supercar Challenge entries.
2	Red Bull Ring, Austria	19–21 May	BG Sport Events	All races contested with Supercar Challenge entries.
3	Circuit de Spa-Francorchamps, Belgium	2–4 June	Spa Euro Races	All races contested with Supercar Challenge entries.
4	Circuit Zolder, Belgium	7–9 July	Zolder Superprix	All races contested with Supercar Challenge entries.
5	TT Circuit Assen, Netherlands	11–13 August	JACK'S Racing Day	All races contested with Supercar Challenge entries.
6	Circuit Zandvoort, Netherlands	14–17 September	Trophy of the Dunes	All races contested with Supercar Challenge entries.
7	Circuit de Spa-Francorchamps, Belgium	13–15 October	Racing Festival	Both races contested with Funyo Cup and Sports Prototype Cup entries.
8	TT Circuit Assen, Netherlands	27–29 October	Supercar Madness Finale Races	

== Entry list ==
Team	Chassis	Engine	No.	Drivers	Rounds
CN
(United Kingdom) Revolution Race Cars	Revolution A-One 500SC	Ford 3.7 L V6	500	(Netherlands) Milan DeLaet	6
(United Kingdom) Revolution Race Cars	Revolution A-One 500SC	Ford 3.7 L V6	500	(United Kingdom) Richard Morris	6
(United Kingdom) Revolution Race Cars	Revolution A-One 500SC	Ford 3.7 L V6	563	(United Kingdom) James Booth	6
(United Kingdom) Revolution Race Cars	Revolution A-One 500SC	Ford 3.7 L V6	577	(Brazil) Joaquim Penteado	6
(Belgium) Deldiche Racing	Norma M20-FC	Honda K20A 2.0 L I4	611	(Belgium) Thomas Piessens	4
(Belgium) Deldiche Racing	Norma M20-FC	Honda K20A 2.0 L I4	611	(Belgium) Sam Dejonghe	TBA
(France) BS Racing by Baticonsult	Norma M20-FC	Honda K20A 2.0 L I4	614	(Luxembourg) Alain Berg	3, 5
(France) BS Racing by Baticonsult	Norma M20-FC	Honda K20A 2.0 L I4	614	(Belgium) Patrick Engelen	3
(Netherlands) DayVTec	Ligier JS P3	Nissan VK50VE 5.0 L V8	615	(Netherlands) Mathijs Bakker	5
(Netherlands) DayVTec	Ligier JS P3	Nissan VK50VE 5.0 L V8	615	(Netherlands) Joshua Kreuger	5
(United Kingdom) Idola Motorsport	Praga R1 (Mk5)	Renault F4R 832 2.0 L I4	616	(United Kingdom) Ed Bridle	5
(United Kingdom) Idola Motorsport	Praga R1 (Mk5)	Renault F4R 832 2.0 L I4	616	(Norway) Lilo Fryrileiv	5
(United Kingdom) Idola Motorsport	Praga R1 (Mk5)	Renault F4R 832 2.0 L I4	617	(Venezuela) Rodolfo González	5
(United Kingdom) Idola Motorsport	Praga R1 (Mk5)	Renault F4R 832 2.0 L I4	617	(Italy) Antonio la Rosa	5
(United Kingdom) Idola Motorsport	Praga R1 (Mk5)	Renault F4R 832 2.0 L I4	618	(Venezuela) Rodolfo González	3
(United Kingdom) Idola Motorsport	Praga R1 (Mk5)	Renault F4R 832 2.0 L I4	618	(United Kingdom) William Stowell	3
(United Kingdom) Idola Motorsport	Praga R1 (Mk5)	Renault F4R 832 2.0 L I4	619	(United Kingdom) Chris Bridle	5
(United Kingdom) Idola Motorsport	Praga R1 (Mk5)	Renault F4R 832 2.0 L I4	619	(United Kingdom) William Stowell	5
Radical
(Netherlands) Radical Motorsport	Radical SR3	Suzuki RPE 1.5 L I4	705	(United Kingdom) Robin Greenhalgh	1–2, 4–7
(Netherlands) Radical Motorsport	Radical SR3	Suzuki RPE 1.5 L I4	705	(United Kingdom) Jerome Greenhalgh	1, 3–7
(Netherlands) Radical Motorsport	Radical SR3	Suzuki RPE 1.5 L I4	710	(Luxembourg) Alain Berg	6
(Netherlands) Radical Motorsport	Radical SR3	Suzuki RPE 1.5 L I4	710	(Netherlands) Mitchell van Dijk	6
(Netherlands) Radical Motorsport	Radical SR3	Suzuki RPE 1.5 L I4	722	(Netherlands) Melvin van Dam	2–5
(Netherlands) Radical Motorsport	Radical SR3	Suzuki RPE 1.5 L I4	722	(Netherlands) Eddie van Dam	4
(Netherlands) Radical Motorsport	Radical SR3	Suzuki RPE 1.5 L I4	722	(Netherlands) Sam Jongejan	5
(Netherlands) Radical Motorsport	Radical SR3	Suzuki RPE 1.5 L I4	733	(Netherlands) Eddie van Dam	1–3, 5–7
(Netherlands) Radical Motorsport	Radical SR3	Suzuki RPE 1.5 L I4	733	(Netherlands) Melvin van Dam	1, 6–7
(Netherlands) Radical Motorsport	Radical SR3	Suzuki RPE 1.5 L I4	733	(Netherlands) Sam Jongejan	2
(Netherlands) Radical Motorsport	Radical SR3	Suzuki RPE 1.5 L I4	733	(Romania) Vlad Raducanu	3
(Netherlands) Radical Motorsport	Radical SR3	Suzuki RPE 1.5 L I4	733	(Luxembourg) Alain Berg	4
(Netherlands) Radical Motorsport	Radical SR3	Suzuki RPE 1.5 L I4	733	(Netherlands) Bastiaan van Loenen	4
(Netherlands) Radical Motorsport	Radical SR3	Suzuki RPE 1.5 L I4	733	(Netherlands) Luuk van Wijngaarden	5
(Belgium) Radical Benelux	Radical SR1	Suzuki RPE 1.3 L I4	710	(Netherlands) Mitchell van Dijk	5, 8
(Belgium) Radical Benelux	Radical SR1	Suzuki RPE 1.3 L I4	710	(Netherlands) Oscar Vianen	5
(Belgium) Radical Benelux	Radical SR1	Suzuki RPE 1.3 L I4	710	(Netherlands) Luuk van Wijngaarden	8
(Senegal) Domec Racing	Radical RXC Spyder	Ford 3.7 L V6	711	(Senegal) Nagy Kabaz	4, 7
(Senegal) Domec Racing	Radical SR3 RSX	Suzuki RPE 1.5 L I4	750	(Belgium) Martin Lucas	4, 7
(Senegal) Domec Racing	Radical SR3	Suzuki RPE 1.5 L I4	751	(Romania) Vlad Raducanu	1–4
(Senegal) Domec Racing	Radical SR3	Suzuki RPE 1.5 L I4	751	(Luxembourg) Alain Berg	1
Non-championship entries
Funyo Sprint Cup
(France) L'Ecurie Française	Funyo SP05 Evo	Peugeot 1.6 L I4	2	(France) Romain Boeckler	6
(France) L'Ecurie Française	Funyo SP05 Evo	Peugeot 1.6 L I4	33	(Italy) Edoardo Elia	6
(France) L'Ecurie Française	Funyo SP05 Evo	Peugeot 1.6 L I4	33	(Italy) Livio Elia	6
(France) AMGV Sport Racing	Funyo SP05 Evo	Peugeot 1.6 L I4	7	(Switzerland) David Litzistorf	6
(France) AMGV Sport Racing	Funyo SP05 Evo	Peugeot 1.6 L I4	64	(France) Etienne Champetier	6
(France) AMGV Sport Racing	Funyo SP05 Evo	Peugeot 1.6 L I4	83	(France) Dominique Arnoux	6
(France) Belt Racing	Funyo SP05 Evo	Peugeot 1.6 L I4	12	(France) Benoit Eveillard	6
(France) HMC Racing	Funyo SP05 Evo	Peugeot 1.6 L I4	21	(France) Bruno Fretin	6
(France) HMC Racing	Funyo SP05 Evo	Peugeot 1.6 L I4	23	(France) Nicolas Cannard	6
(France) HMC Racing	Funyo SP05 Evo	Peugeot 1.6 L I4	28	(France) Jean-Claude Rolland	6
(France) HMC Racing	Funyo SP05 Evo	Peugeot 1.6 L I4	54	(France) Jérémy Siffert	6
(France) HMC Racing	Funyo SP05 Evo	Peugeot 1.6 L I4	77	(United States) Alex Gaines	6
(France) HMC Racing	Funyo SP05 Evo	Peugeot 1.6 L I4	79	(France) Eric Soares	6
(France) Spirit of 78	Funyo SP05 Evo	Peugeot 1.6 L I4	26	(France) Frank Lefevre	6
(France) Spirit of 78	Funyo SP05 Evo	Peugeot 1.6 L I4	49	(France) Rémy Brouard	6
(France) Kairos Racing	Funyo SP05 Evo	Peugeot 1.6 L I4	99	(France) David Braunstein	6
(France) Pegasus Racing	Funyo SP05 Evo	Peugeot 1.6 L I4	294	(France) Alain Meyer	6
(France) Pegasus Racing	Funyo SP05 Evo	Peugeot 1.6 L I4	294	(France) Jordan Meyer	6
Sports Prototype Cup
(Germany) DD-Compound	Revolution A-One 500SC	Ford 3.7 L V6	76	(Germany) Dominik Dierkes	6
(Germany) DD-Compound	Revolution A-One 500SC	Ford 3.7 L V6	76	(Netherlands) Rob Kamphues	6
(United Kingdom) Revolution Race Cars	Revolution A-One 500SC	Ford 3.7 L V6	89	(Canada) Elvis Stojko	6
(United Kingdom) Revolution Race Cars	Revolution A-One 500SC	Ford 3.7 L V6	89	(Germany) Markus Zunker	6
(United Kingdom) Revolution Race Cars	Revolution A-One 500SC	Ford 3.7 L V6	500	(Netherlands) Milan DeLaet	6
(United Kingdom) Revolution Race Cars	Revolution A-One 500SC	Ford 3.7 L V6	500	(United Kingdom) Richard Morris	6
(United Kingdom) Revolution Race Cars	Revolution A-One 500SC	Ford 3.7 L V6	563	(United Kingdom) James Booth	6
(United Kingdom) Revolution Race Cars	Revolution A-One 500SC	Ford 3.7 L V6	577	(Brazil) Joaquim Penteado	6

== Race results ==
Bold indicates overall winner.

Round		Circuit	CN Winning Car	Radical Winning Car
Round		Circuit	CN Drivers	Radical Winning Drivers
1	R1	(Netherlands) Zandvoort	No entries	**(Netherlands) No. 733 Radical Motorsport**
1	R1	(Netherlands) Zandvoort	No entries	**(Netherlands) Eddie van Dam** **(Netherlands) Melvin van Dam**
1	R2	(Netherlands) Zandvoort	No entries	**(Netherlands) No. 705 Radical Motorsport**
1	R2	(Netherlands) Zandvoort	No entries	**(United Kingdom) Jerome Greenhalgh** **(United Kingdom) Robin Greenhalgh**
2	R1	(Austria) Red Bull Ring	No entries	**(Netherlands) No. 722 Radical Motorsport**
2	R1	(Austria) Red Bull Ring	No entries	**(Netherlands) Melvin van Dam**
2	R2	(Austria) Red Bull Ring	No entries	**(Senegal) No. 751 Domec Racing**
2	R2	(Austria) Red Bull Ring	No entries	**(Romania) Vlad Raducanu**
3	R1	(Belgium) Spa-Francorchamps	**(France) No. 614 BS Racing by Baticonsult**	(Netherlands) No. 705 Radical Motorsport
3	R1	(Belgium) Spa-Francorchamps	**(Luxembourg) Alain Berg** **(Belgium) Patrick Engelen**	(United Kingdom) Jerome Greenhalgh
3	R2	(Belgium) Spa-Francorchamps	**(Netherlands) No. 618 Idola Motorsport**	(Netherlands) No. 705 Radical Motorsport
3	R2	(Belgium) Spa-Francorchamps	**(Venezuela) Rodolfo González** **(United Kingdom) William Stowell**	(United Kingdom) Jerome Greenhalgh
4	R1	(Belgium) Zolder	**(Belgium) No. 611 Deldiche Racing**	(Senegal) No. 750 Domec Racing
4	R1	(Belgium) Zolder	**(Belgium) Thomas Piessens**	(Belgium) Martin Lucas
4	R2	(Belgium) Zolder	**(Belgium) No. 611 Deldiche Racing**	(Netherlands) No. 744 Radical Motorsport
4	R2	(Belgium) Zolder	**(Belgium) Thomas Piessens**	(Luxembourg) Alain Berg (Netherlands) Bastiaan van Loenen
5	R1	(Netherlands) Assen	**(Netherlands) No. 615 DayVTec**	(Netherlands) No. 705 Radical Motorsport
5	R1	(Netherlands) Assen	**(Netherlands) Mathijs Bakker** **(Netherlands) Joshua Kreuger**	(United Kingdom) Jerome Greenhalgh (United Kingdom) Robin Greenhalgh
5	R2	(Netherlands) Assen	**(Netherlands) No. 615 DayVTec**	(Belgium) No. 710 Radical Benelux
5	R2	(Netherlands) Assen	**(Netherlands) Mathijs Bakker** **(Netherlands) Joshua Kreuger**	(Netherlands) Mitchell van Dijk (Netherlands) Oscar Vianen
6	R1	(Netherlands) Zandvoort	**(United Kingdom) No. 500 Revolution Race Cars**	(Netherlands) No. 705 Radical Motorsport
6	R1	(Netherlands) Zandvoort	**(Netherlands) Milan DeLaet** **(United Kingdom) Richard Morris**	(United Kingdom) Jerome Greenhalgh (United Kingdom) Robin Greenhalgh
6	R2	(Netherlands) Zandvoort	**(United Kingdom) No. 500 Revolution Race Cars**	(Netherlands) No. 705 Radical Motorsport
6	R2	(Netherlands) Zandvoort	**(Netherlands) Milan DeLaet** **(United Kingdom) Richard Morris**	(United Kingdom) Jerome Greenhalgh (United Kingdom) Robin Greenhalgh
7	R1	(Belgium) Spa-Francorchamps	No entries	**(Netherlands) No. 710 Radical Motorsport**
7	R1	(Belgium) Spa-Francorchamps	No entries	**(Luxembourg) Alain Berg** **(Netherlands) Mitchell van Dijk**
7	R2	(Belgium) Spa-Francorchamps	No entries	**(Netherlands) No. 705 Radical Motorsport**
7	R2	(Belgium) Spa-Francorchamps	No entries	**(United Kingdom) Jerome Greenhalgh** **(United Kingdom) Robin Greenhalgh**
8	R1	(Netherlands) Assen	No entries	**(Belgium) No. 710 Radical Benelux**
8	R1	(Netherlands) Assen	No entries	**(Netherlands) Mitchell van Dijk** **(Netherlands) Luuk van Wijngaarden**
8	R2	(Netherlands) Assen	No entries	**(Belgium) No. 710 Radical Benelux**
8	R2	(Netherlands) Assen	No entries	**(Netherlands) Mitchell van Dijk** **(Netherlands) Luuk van Wijngaarden**

=== Championship standings ===
Position	**1st**	**2nd**	**3rd**	**4th**	**5th**	**6th**	**7th**	**8th**	**9th**	**10th**	**11th**	**Pole**
Points	23	20	17	15	13	11	9	7	5	3	1	1

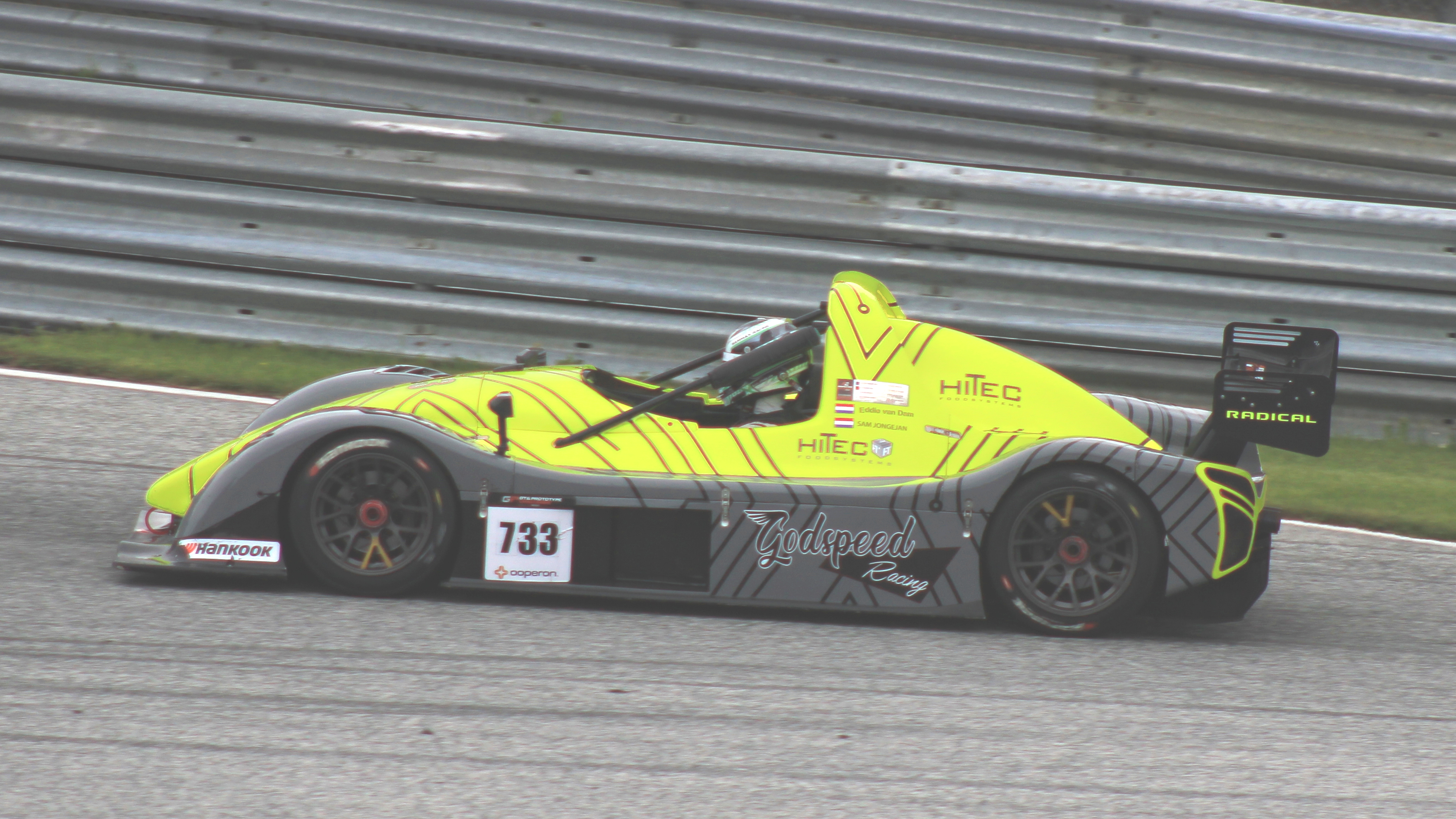
Eddie van Dam leads the Radical drivers' standings.

Pos.	Driver	Team	(Netherlands) ZAN		(Austria) RBR		(Belgium) SPA		(Belgium) ZOL		(Netherlands) ASS		(Netherlands) ZAN		(Belgium) SPA	(Netherlands) ASS	Points
CN
1	(Luxembourg) Alain Berg	(France) BS Racing by Baticonsult					1	3			**2**	2					84
1	(Belgium) Patrick Engelen	(France) BS Racing by Baticonsult					1	3									84
2	(United Kingdom) William Stowell	(United Kingdom) Idola Motorsport					**4**	1			9	10					78
3	(Venezuela) Rodolfo González	(United Kingdom) Idola Motorsport					**4**	1			Ret	39					59
4	(Belgium) Thomas Piessens	(Belgium) Deldiche Racing							**1**	4							47
5	(Netherlands) Milan DeLaet (United Kingdom) Richard Morris	(United Kingdom) Revolution Race Cars											**3**	1			47
6	(Netherlands) Mathijs Bakker (Netherlands) Joshua Kreuger	(Netherlands) DayVTec									1	1					46
7	(Brazil) Joaquim Penteado	(United Kingdom) Revolution Race Cars											8	4			40
8	(United Kingdom) Chris Bridle	(United Kingdom) Idola Motorsport									9	10					34
9	(United Kingdom) James Booth	(United Kingdom) Revolution Race Cars											14	11			34
10	(United Kingdom) Ed Bridle (Norway) Lilo Fryrileiv	(United Kingdom) Idola Motorsport									12	40					28
11	(Italy) Antonio La Rosa	(United Kingdom) Idola Motorsport									Ret	39					15
Radical
1	(Netherlands) Eddie van Dam	(Netherlands) Radical Motorsport	4	8	11	12	13	29	Ret	9	13	35	10	10			168
2	(Romania) Vlad Raducanu	(Senegal) Domec Racing	8	12	10	7	DNS	DNS	**6**	17							150
2	(Romania) Vlad Raducanu	(Netherlands) Radical Motorsport					13	29									150
3	(United Kingdom) Robin Greenhalgh	(Netherlands) Radical Motorsport	**5**	7	13	DSQ			11	Ret	**10**	Ret	**7**	6			145
3	(United Kingdom) Jerome Greenhalgh	(Netherlands) Radical Motorsport	**5**	7			**10**	6	11	Ret	**10**	Ret	**7**	6			145
4	(Netherlands) Melvin van Dam	(Netherlands) Radical Motorsport	4	8	**9**	8	Ret	13	Ret	9	11	Ret	10	10			144
5	(Luxembourg) Alain Berg	(Senegal) Domec Racing	8	12													70
5	(Luxembourg) Alain Berg	(Netherlands) Radical Motorsport							17	3							70
6	(Netherlands) Sam Jongejan	(Netherlands) Radical Motorsport			11	12					11	Ret					54
7	(Belgium) Martin Lucas	(Senegal) Domec Racing							5	6							43
8	(Netherlands) Mitchell van Dijk (Netherlands) Oscar Vianen	(Belgium) Radical Benelux									26	23					38
9	(Netherlands) Luuk van Wijngaarden	(Netherlands) Radical Motorsport									13	35					37
10	(Netherlands) Bastiaan van Loenen	(Netherlands) Radical Motorsport							17	3							36
11	(Senegal) Nagy Kabaz	(Senegal) Domec Racing							9	Ret							17
Pos.	Driver	Team	(Netherlands) ZAN		(Austria) RBR		(Belgium) SPA		(Belgium) ZOL		(Netherlands) ASS		(Netherlands) ZAN		(Belgium) SPA	(Netherlands) ASS	Points

Key
Colour	Result
Gold	Winner
Silver	Second place
Bronze	Third place
Green	Other points position
Blue	Other classified position
Blue	Not classified, finished (NC)
Purple	Not classified, retired (Ret)
Red	Did not qualify (DNQ)
Red	Did not pre-qualify (DNPQ)
Black	Disqualified (DSQ)
White	Did not start (DNS)
White	Race cancelled (C)
Blank	Did not practice (DNP)
Blank	Excluded (EX)
Blank	Did not arrive (DNA)
Blank	Withdrawn (WD)
Blank	Did not enter (cell empty)
Text formatting	Meaning
**Bold**	Pole position
Italics	Fastest lap
