= Ligier JS53 =

Prototype race car

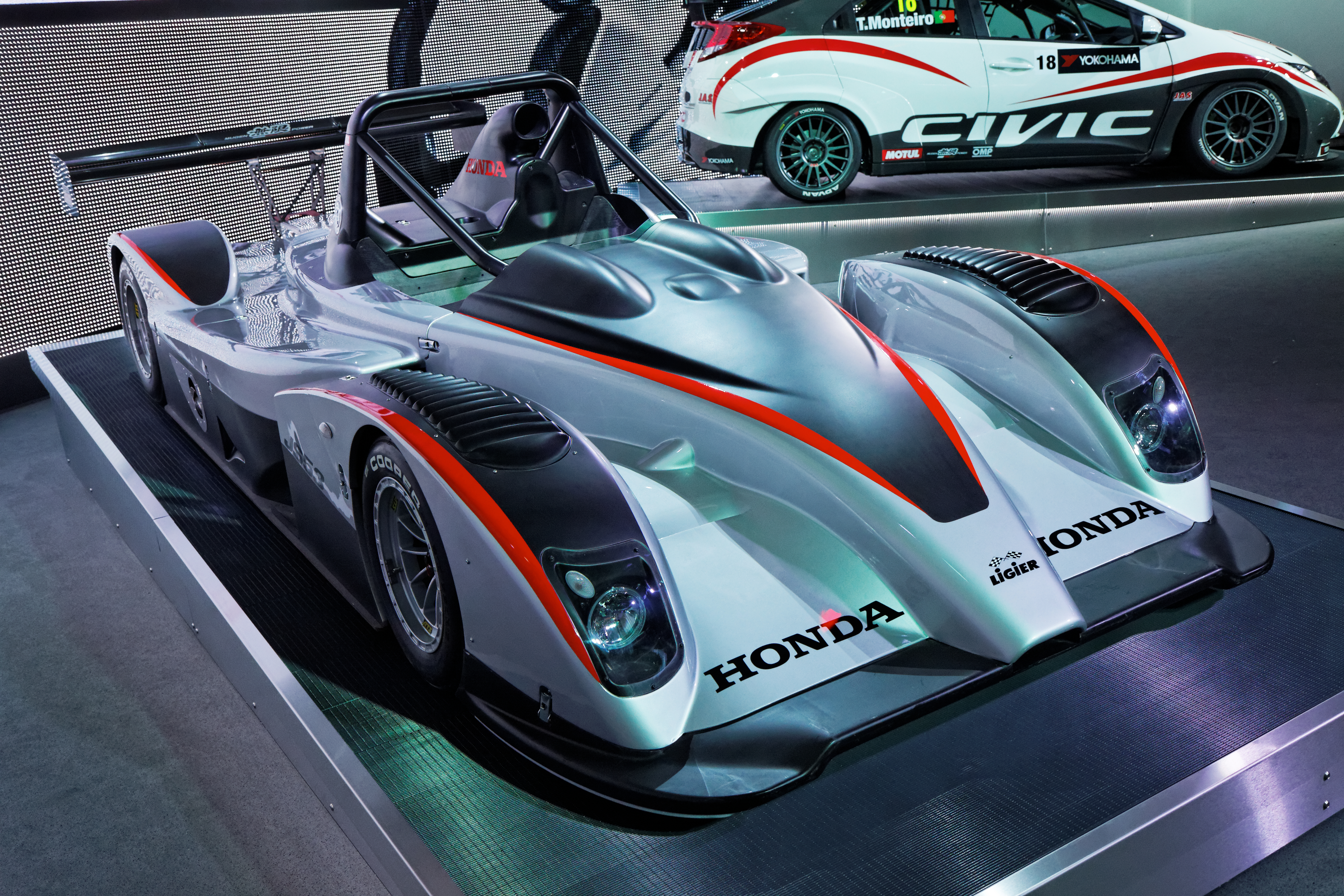
- Category: CN
- Constructor: Ligier
- Designer: Nicolas Clémençon

Technical specifications
- Chassis: Carbon-fiber monocoque covered in pre-peg fiberglass HP composite body panels
- Suspension (front): Double wishbones, pushrod with mono-shock absorber system, and torsion-bar springs, anti-roll bar
- Suspension (rear): Double wishbones, pushrod with mono-shock absorber system and coils springs, anti-roll bar
- Length: 4,620 mm (182 in)
- Width: 1,800 mm (71 in)
- Wheelbase: 2,650 mm (104 in)
- Engine: Honda K20A or Peugeot 1.6–2.0 L (98–122 cu in) DOHC inline-4 engine naturally-aspirated, longitudinally mounted in a mid-engined, rear-wheel drive layout
- Transmission: SADEV 6-speed semi-automatic sequential gearbox
- Power: 255 hp (190 kW)
- Weight: 570 kg (1,257 lb) including driver
- Fuel: Various unleaded control fuel
- Lubricants: Various
- Brakes: Brembo ventilated carbon brake discs, 6-piston calipers, and pads
- Tyres: Various

Competition history
- Debut: 2012

The Ligier JS53 is a sports prototype race car, designed, developed and built by Ligier, in collaboration with Onroak Automotive, conforming to FIA Group CN regulations to compete in sports car racing and hillclimb events since 2012.

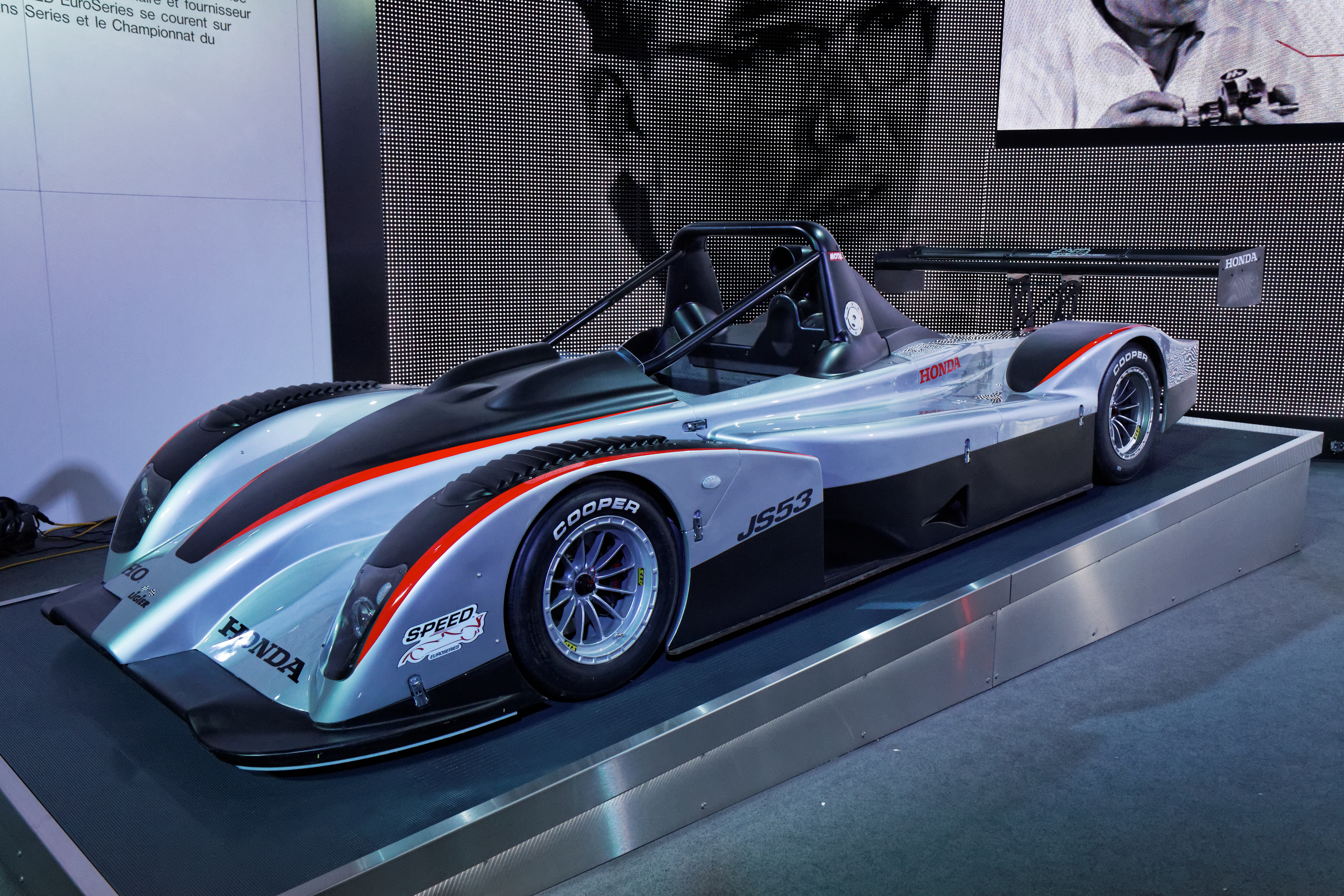
Side-view
