= Ligier JS51 =

French sports prototype race car designed and built by Ligier

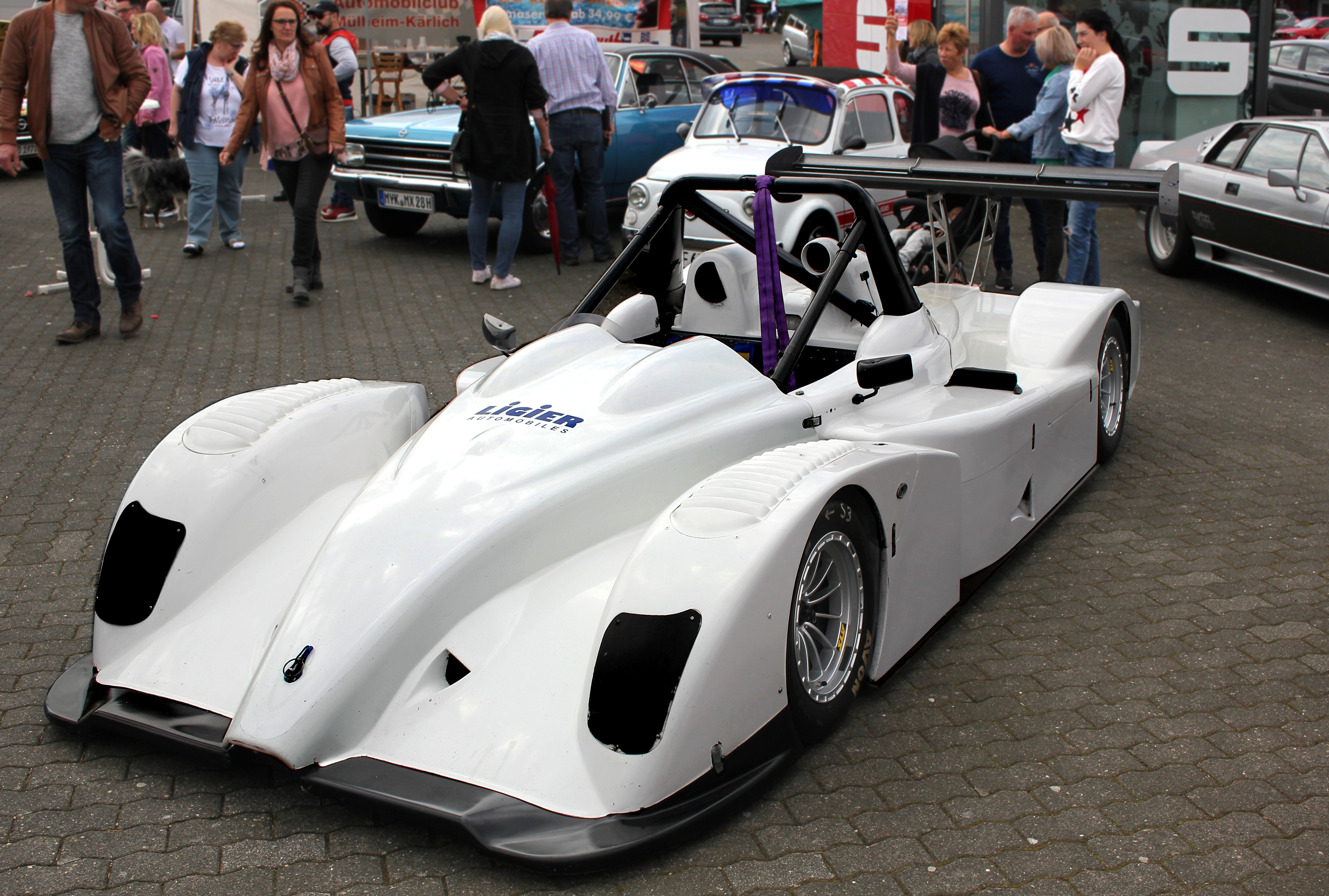
- Category: CN
- Constructor: Ligier

Technical specifications
- Chassis: Aluminum monocoque covered in carbon-fiber body panels
- Suspension (front): Double wishbones, pushrod with mono-shock absorber system, and torsion-bar springs, anti-roll bar
- Suspension (rear): Double wishbones, pushrod with mono-shock absorber system and coils springs, anti-roll bar
- Length: 4,725 mm (186 in)
- Width: 1,800 mm (71 in)
- Axle track: 1,510 mm (59 in) (front); 1,470 mm (58 in) (rear)
- Engine: Mugen-Honda K20A 2.0 L (122 cu in) DOHC inline-4 engine naturally-aspirated, longitudinally mounted in a mid-engined, rear-wheel drive layout
- Transmission: SADEV 6-speed sequential gearbox
- Power: 250–260 hp (186–194 kW)
- Weight: 570 kg (1,257 lb) including driver
- Fuel: Various unleaded control fuel
- Lubricants: Various
- Brakes: Brembo ventilated carbon brake discs, 6-piston calipers and pads
- Tyres: Various

Competition history
- Debut: 2008

The Ligier JS51 is a sports prototype race car, designed, developed, and built by Ligier, conforming to FIA Group CN regulations, to compete in sports car racing, since 2008.
