= Osella PA21 =

Prototype race car

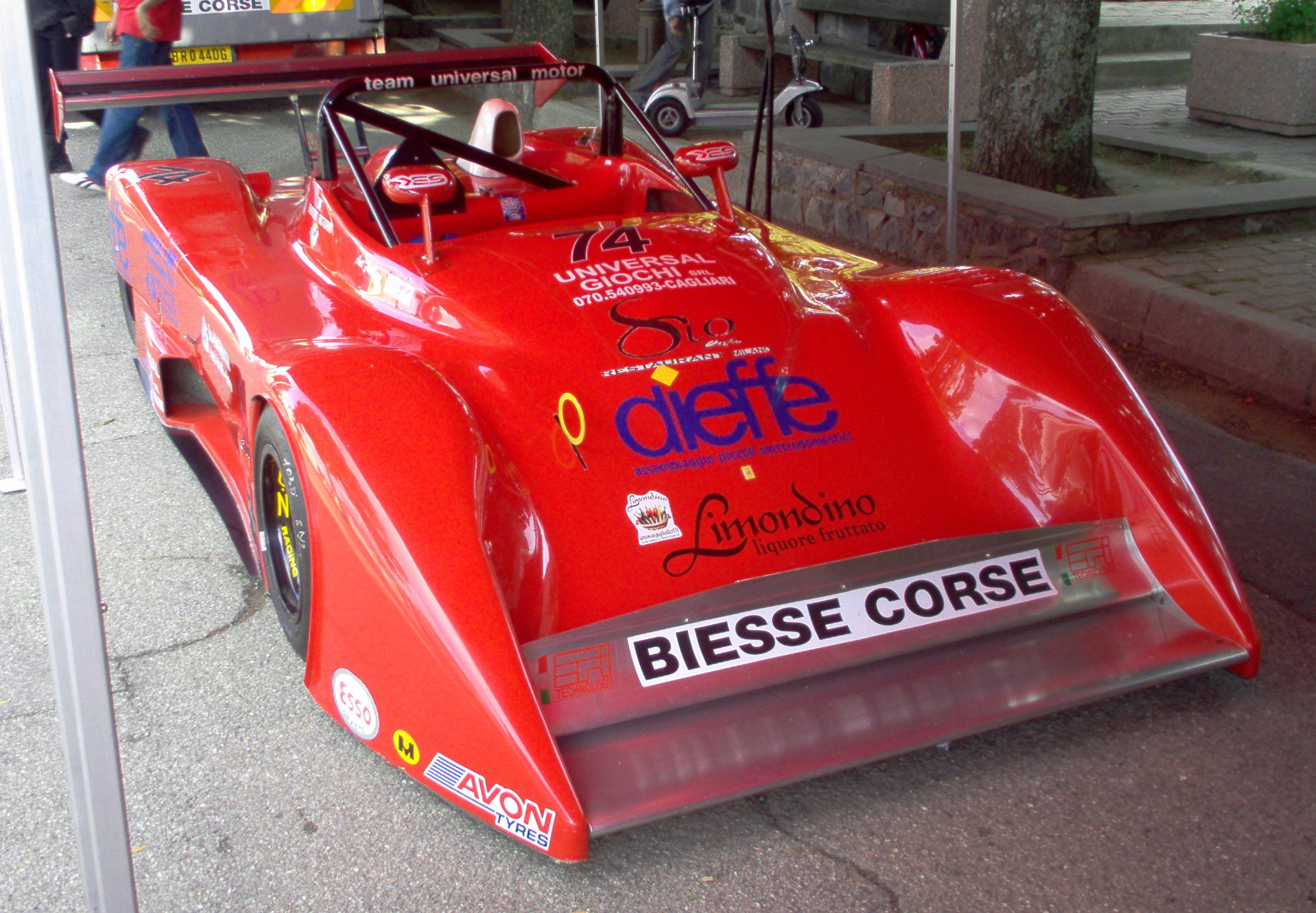
- Category: Group CN
- Constructor: Osella

Technical specifications
- Chassis: Steel tube-frame with aluminum panels and fiberglass body
- Suspension (front): Double wishbones, coil springs over dampers, anti-roll bar
- Suspension (rear): Single top links, twin lower links, twin radius arms, coil springs over dampers, anti-roll bar
- Engine: Various (mostly 2.0 L (120 cu in) Honda K20 I4); 1.0–1.6 L (61–98 cu in) I4 motorcycle engine (such as Hayabusa or S1000RR)
- Transmission: Sadev 6-speed sequential, mid-engined, rear wheel drive
- Power: 200–270 hp (150–200 kW)
- Weight: 370–538 kg (816–1,186 lb)

Competition history

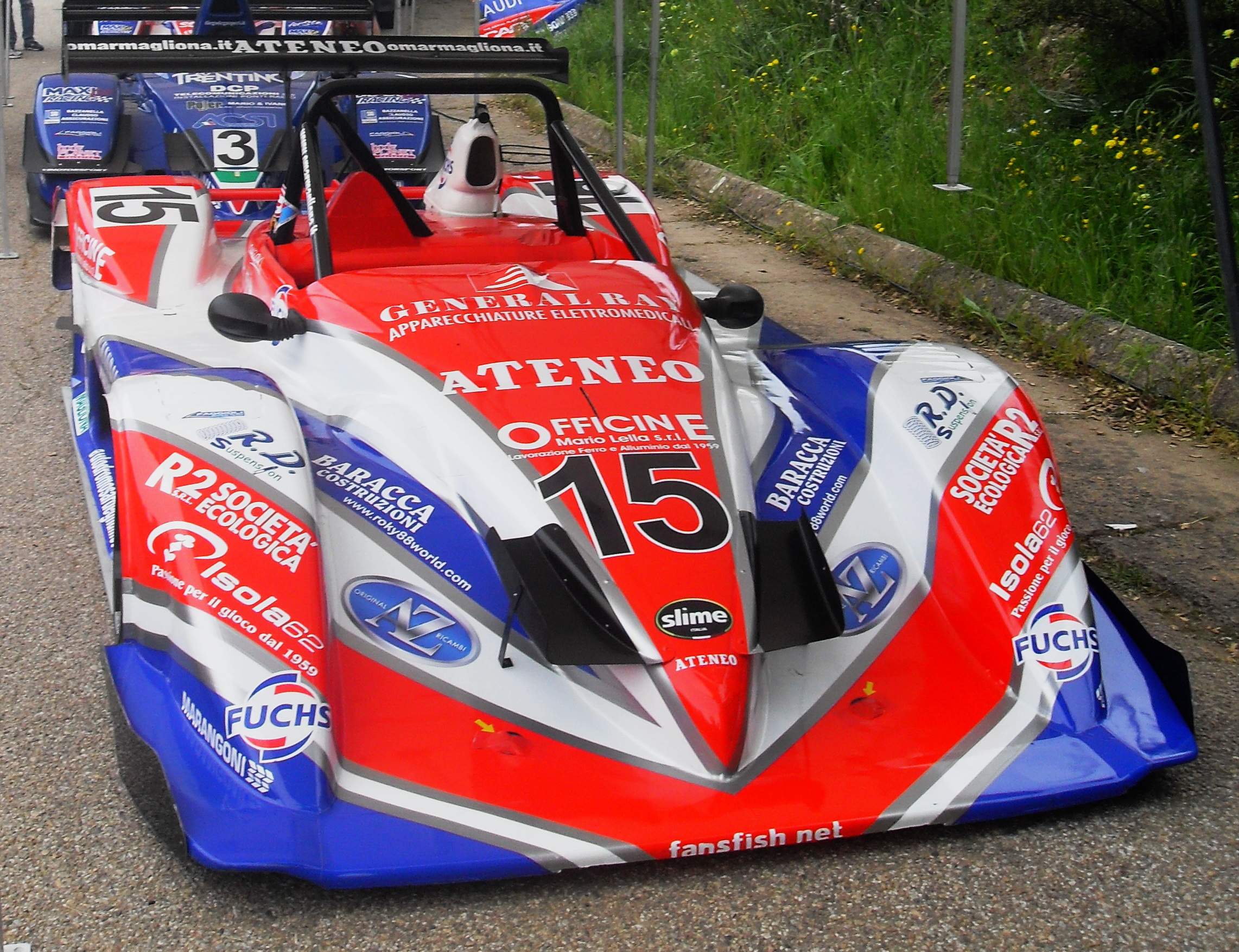
Osella PA21 EVO

The Osella PA21 is a series of Group CN sports prototype race cars, developed and built by Italian manufacturer Osella. The cars mostly compete in hillclimb races, trials, and events. They are commonly powered by, and designed to be equipped with either a naturally-aspirated 2.0 L (120 cu in) Honda K20 engine, producing in excess of 250 hp (190 kW), or a motorcycle engine, in the displacement range of 1.0–1.6 L (61–98 cu in), such as a Suzuki Hayabusa, or an S1000RR motor.
