= Ligier JS55 =

Prototype race car

- Category: CN
- Constructor: Ligier

Technical specifications
- Chassis: Carbon-fiber monocoque covered in pre-peg fiberglass HP composite body panels
- Suspension (front): Double wishbones, pushrod with mono-shock absorber system, and torsion-bar springs, anti-roll bar
- Suspension (rear): Double wishbones, pushrod with mono-shock absorber system and coils springs, anti-roll bar
- Length: 4,620 mm (182 in)
- Width: 1,800 mm (71 in)
- Wheelbase: 2,650 mm (104 in)
- Engine: Honda K20A 2.0 L (122 cu in) DOHC inline-4 engine naturally-aspirated, longitudinally mounted in a mid-engined, rear-wheel drive layout
- Transmission: SADEV 6-speed semi-automatic sequential gearbox
- Power: 255 hp (190 kW)
- Weight: 570 kg (1,257 lb) including driver
- Fuel: Various unleaded control fuel
- Lubricants: Various
- Brakes: Brembo ventilated carbon brake discs, 6-piston calipers, and pads
- Tyres: Various

Competition history
- Debut: 2014

The Ligier JS55 is a sports prototype race car, designed, developed, and built by Ligier, in collaboration with Onroak Automotive, conforming to FIA Group CN regulations, to compete in sports car racing, since 2014.
