= Ligier Automotive =

French manufacturer of racing cars

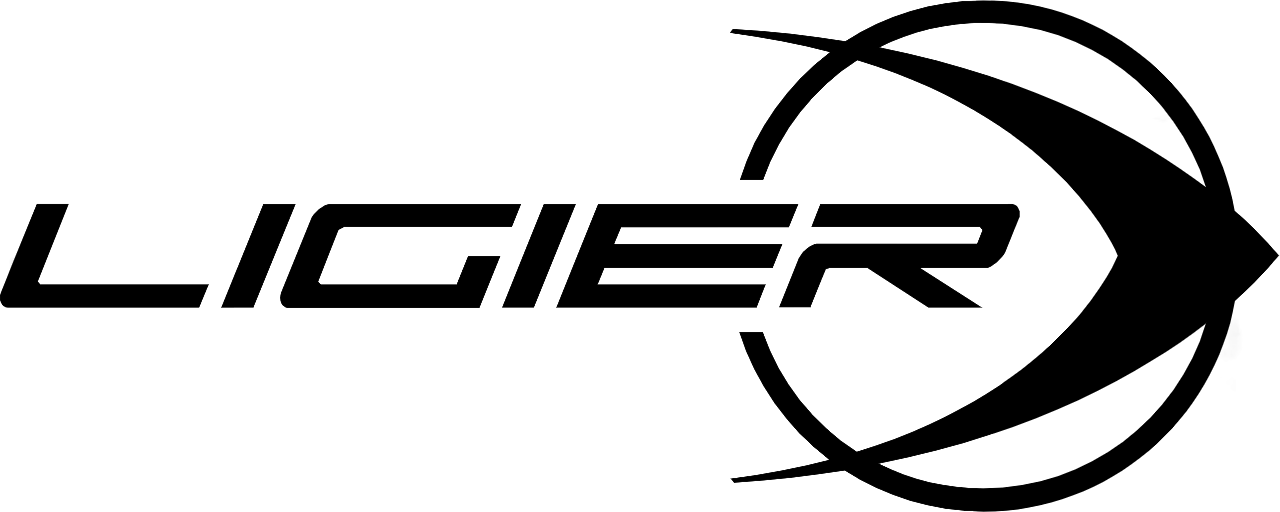
- Industry: Auto racing
- Predecessor: Onroak Automotive
- Founded: 2012
- Founder: Jacques Nicolet
- Headquarters: Le Mans, France
- Key people: Nicolas Clémençon
- Parent: Ligier; Everspeed
- Website: ligierautomotive.com/en/

Ligier Automotive, formerly Onroak Automotive, is a French company which designs, manufacturers, and sells racing cars, specifically sports prototypes for various international series. Onroak was founded in 2012 by Jacques Nicolet who split the design, manufacturing, and sales divisions of his OAK Racing team into an independent company. Onroak has since formed an agreement with Philippe Ligier, the son of Formula One driver Guy Ligier, to develop new cars under the Ligier brand. On 31 December 2018, it was announced that Onroak Automotive would be rebranded to Ligier Automotive as part of a rebranding and reorganization of Everspeed's automotive assets.

== History ==
Onroak's roots can be traced to December 2009 when OAK Racing reached an agreement with Pescarolo Sport to take over their manufacturing arm, specifically the continued construction and co-development of the Pescarolo 01 Le Mans Prototype that had been designed in 2007. OAK, while under their previous title of Saulnier Racing, had been a Pescarolo customer since 2008, campaigning two cars in the European Le Mans Series. OAK eventually became the sole developer of the 01 design when Pescarolo went into receivership, and campaigned and sold the cars under the OAK-Pescarolo moniker.

In 2012 new regulations for Le Mans Prototypes required teams to replace existing cars with new designs or alter them to meet the regulations. Onroak was created to develop a new design for the existing Pescarolo chassis as well as to pursue sales of the car to other teams seeking cars meeting the new regulations. Onroak then formed a partnership with Morgan Motor Company to brand the LMP2 class variant of their new design as the Morgan LMP2, while the LMP1 version retained the OAK-Pescarolo title.

During 2013 Onroak formed a partnership with Guy Ligier to assist in the development and sales of an evolutionary version of the Ligier JS 53 Group CN prototype before designing a closed-cockpit variant known as the JS 55 in 2014. This agreement extended to naming rights for a new LMP2 car designed and constructed entirely by Onroak in early 2014, the Ligier JS P2. Onroak and Ligier followed the JS P2 with the JS P3 intended for the LMP3 class which debuted in 2015.

In October 2016, Onroak bought the motorsports arm of American manufacturer Crawford Composites.

Onroak was selected as one of the four LMP2 manufacturers for the 2017 regulations. The Ligier JS P217 has competed in the LMP2 class in European Le Mans Series, IMSA SportsCar Championship and the FIA World Endurance Championship. Its chassis was also used by the Nissan Onroak DPi which competed in the DPi class of the IMSA sportscar championship. Ligier also won the tender for the 2028 LMP2 regulations.

=== Tork Engineering ===
In September 2017 Onroak Automotive acquired Tork Engineering. Tork Engineering had many years of experience building racing cars. The French company was responsible for the closed cockpit Bioracing Series sportscar. In 2007 Tork was contracted by Mitjet Series to build the Yamaha powered Mitjet 1300. In 2012 the Renault powered 2.0L version was launched. The car was available with four body types resembling BMW, Mercedes-Benz, Audi and Bugatti. In 2015 Tork Engineering also built the tube framed racecar for the relaunched French Supertouring Championship. The car is powered by a 3.5L V6 engine made by Nissan.

== Models ==
Caption
Year	Car	Picture	Engine	Class
2004	Ligier JS47		Various 2.0L I4	Formula 3
2007	Mitjet 1300		Yamaha 1.3L I4	Mitjet 1300
2008	Tork BRS 4.0		Sodemo-Nissan 4.0L V6	Bioracing Series
2009	Dacia Duster Glace		Nissan VQ30 3.0L V6	Trophee Andros Silhouette
2010	OAK-Pescarolo 01		Judd DB 3.4L V8	Le Mans Prototype 2
2011	Dacia Lodgy Glace		Sodemo 3.0L V6	Trophee Andros Silhouette
2011	Dacia Duster No Limit		Sodemo-Nissan VR38DETT 3.6L V6	PPIHC Unlimited
2012	Morgan LMP2		Judd HK 3.6L V8	Le Mans Prototype 2
2012	Morgan LMP2		Nissan VK45DE 4.5L V8	Le Mans Prototype 2
2012	Mitjet 2.0L		Renault 2.0L I4	Mitjet 2.0L
2013	Mini Countryman		Sodemo-Nissan VR38DETT 3.6L V6	PPIHC Unlimited
2013	Ligier JS53 Evo		Honda K20A 2.0L I4	Group CN
2014	Ligier JS55		Honda K20A 2.0L I4	Group CN
2014	Ligier JS P2		Nissan VK45DE 4.5L V8	Le Mans Prototype 2
2014	Ligier JS P2		Judd HK 3.6L V8	Le Mans Prototype 2
2015	Morgan LMP2 Evo		Honda HR28TT 2.8L V6	Le Mans Prototype 2
2015	Morgan LMP2 Evo		Nissan VK45DE 4.5L V8	Le Mans Prototype 2
2015	Ligier JS P3		Nissan VK50VE 5.0L V8	Le Mans Prototype 3
2015	Mitjet Offroad		Chevrolet LS3 6.2L V8	Group T1
2015	Mitjet V6 ST		Nissan 3.5L V6	FFSA Supertourisme
2016	Crawford F4-16		Honda K20C2	Formula 4
2017	Ligier JS P217		Gibson GK428 4.2L V8	Le Mans Prototype 2
2017	Ligier JS P217		Nissan VR38DETT 3.8L V6	Daytona Prototype International
2018	Ligier JS F3		Honda K20C1 2.0L I4	Formula Regional
2018	Ligier JS F3-S5000		Ford Coyote 5.0L V8	Australian S5000 Championship
2018	Ligier JS P4		Ford 3.7L V6	Group E
2019	Ligier JS2 R		Ford 3.7L V6	Ligier European Series
2020	Ligier JS P320		Nissan VK56DE 5.6L V8	Le Mans Prototype 3
2021	Peugeot 9X8		Peugeot X6H 2.6L V6 twin-turbo	Hypercar / GTP
2024	Lamborghini SC63		Lamborghini 3.8L V8 twin-turbo	Hypercar / GTP
2024	Ligier JS F422		Ligier Storm 1.65L V4	Formula 4
2025	Ligier JS2 RS		Ford Ecoboost D35 3.5L V6	GT2
2025	Ligier JS P325		Toyota V35A-FTS 3.5L V6	Le Mans Prototype 3

Legend
Green	built by Tork Engineering
Blank	built by Onroak Automotive
