= Ligier JS F3 =

Ligier JS F3 Ligier JS F3-S5000
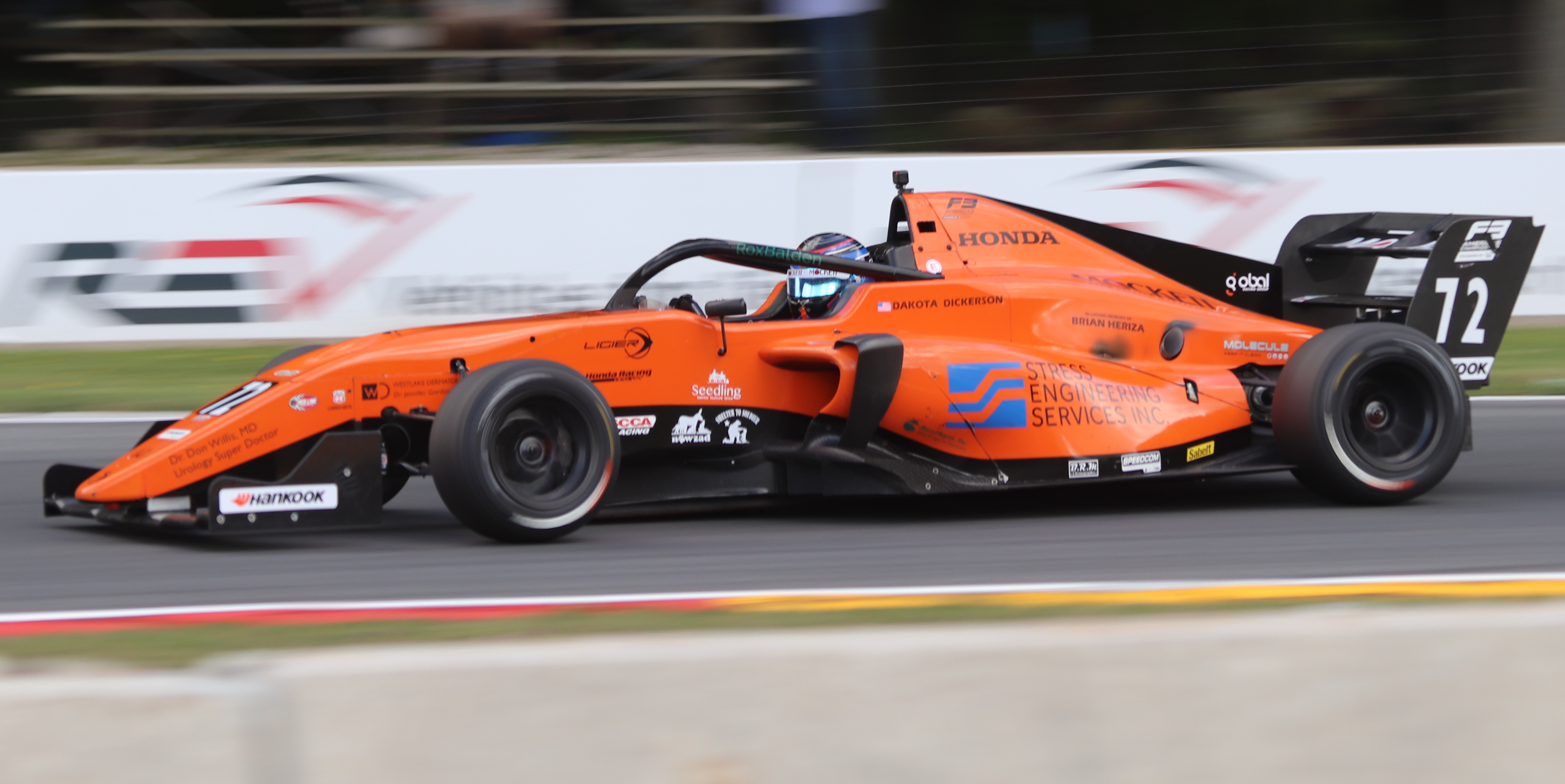
- Category: Formula Three; S5000
- Constructor: Ligier
- Designer: Nicolas Clémençon

Technical specifications
- Chassis: Carbon fiber monocoque
- Suspension: Double wishbones, push-rod actuated coil springs over shock absorbers, anti-roll bars
- Length: 4,895.5–4,900 mm (192.74–192.91 in)
- Width: 1,850–1,950 mm (73–77 in)
- Wheelbase: 2,920–3,000 mm (115–118 in)
- Engine: Mid-engine, longitudinally mounted, 2.0 L (122.0 cu in), Honda K20C, DOHC I4, turbocharged Mid-engine, longitudinally mounted, Ford Coyote, DOHC V8, naturally-aspirated
- Transmission: 6-speed sequential semi-automatic
- Power: 303–560 hp (226–418 kW)
- Weight: 650 kg (1,430 lb)
- Brakes: Disc brakes
- Tyres: Hankook (FR Americas); Hoosier (Australian S5000)

Competition history
- Debut: 2019 Barber F3 Americas round

The Ligier JS F3 is an open-wheel formula race car. It was designed, developed and produced by the French manufacturer Ligier specifically built to FIA Formula 3 regulations, since 2018. It is used in the Formula Regional Americas Championship, and is powered by a 303 hp (226 kW) Honda K20C turbocharged four-cylinder. A modified version, known as the JS F3-S5000, is used in the Australian S5000 Championship, and is powered by a Ford Coyote naturally-aspirated V8 engine, producing 560 hp (420 kW).
