= Rodolfo González (racing driver) =

Venezuelan racing driver (born 1986)

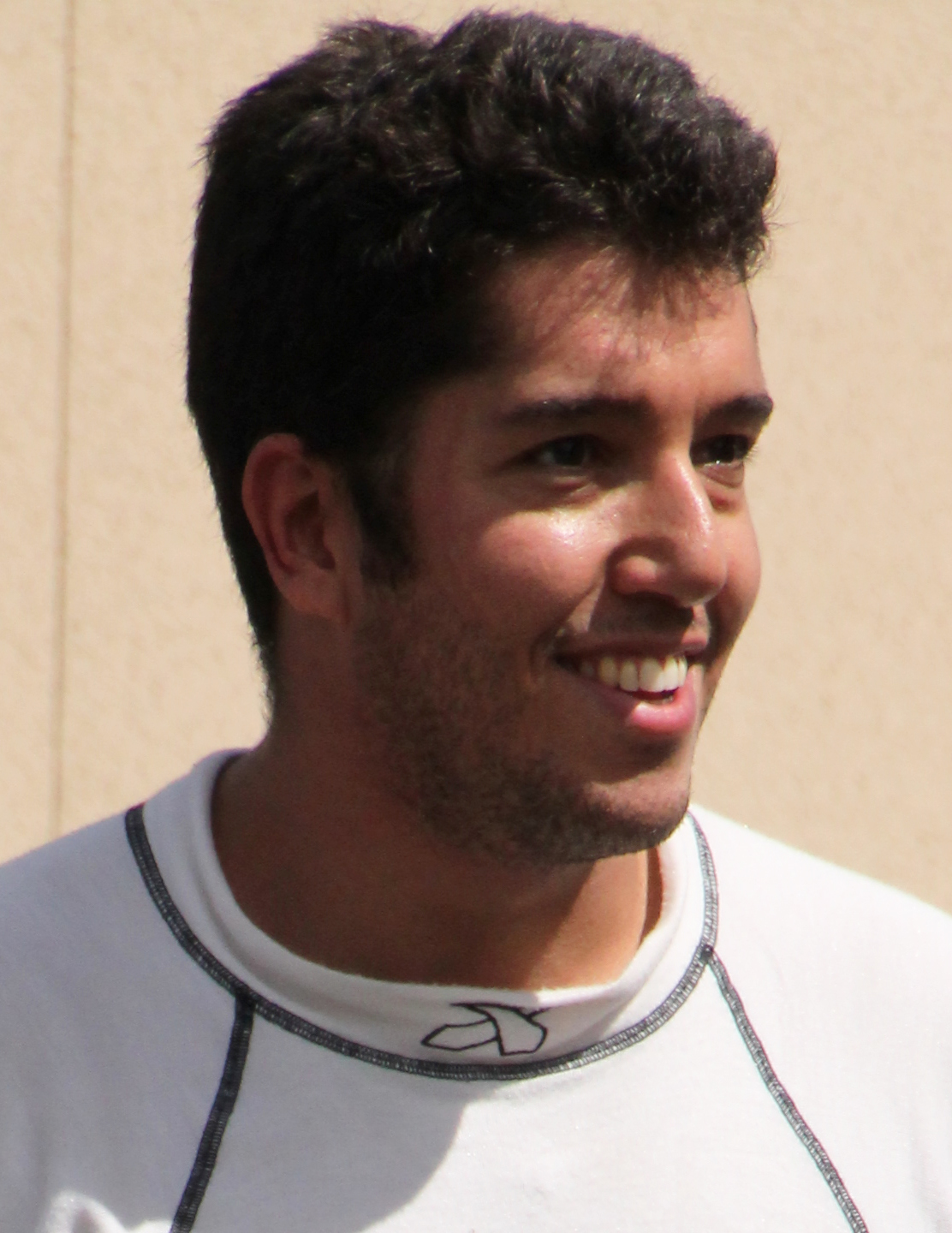
- González at the 2015 GoPro Grand Prix of Sonoma
- Nationality: Venezuelan
- Born: 14 May 1986 (age 40) Caracas, Venezuela

European Le Mans Series career
- Debut season: 2014
- Current team: Murphy Prototypes
- Categorisation: FIA Silver (2014, 2023–); FIA Gold (2015–2019)
- Car number: 48
- Starts: 3
- Wins: 0
- Poles: 0
- Fastest laps: 0
- Best finish: 14th in 2014

Previous series
- 2009–2012 2008–09–2011 2008–09 2008 2006–07 2005 2004–05 2003–05 2002: GP2 Series; GP2 Asia Series; Euroseries 3000; Formula 3 Euro Series; British Formula 3 FR2.0 Netherlands; Formula Renault UK; FRUK Winter Series; Formula Ford UK Winter Series

Championship titles
- 2006: British F3 National Class

Rodolfo González (born 14 May 1986 in Caracas) is a Venezuelan racing driver.

== Career ==
=== Formula Renault ===
After previously competing in karting, González raced in the 2003 Formula Renault 2.0 UK Winter Series, before racing in the main series in 2004 and 2005 while attending City College Norwich.

=== Formula Three ===
González won the British F3 International Series National Class in 2006 for T-Sport. In 2007, he continued to show promise by finishing eleventh in the 2007 British Formula 3 season with T-Sport.

In 2008, González moved to Carlin Motorsport and the Formula Three Euroseries and endured a miserable season, amassing just half a point in the rain-shortened sprint race at Le Mans.

=== GP2 Series ===
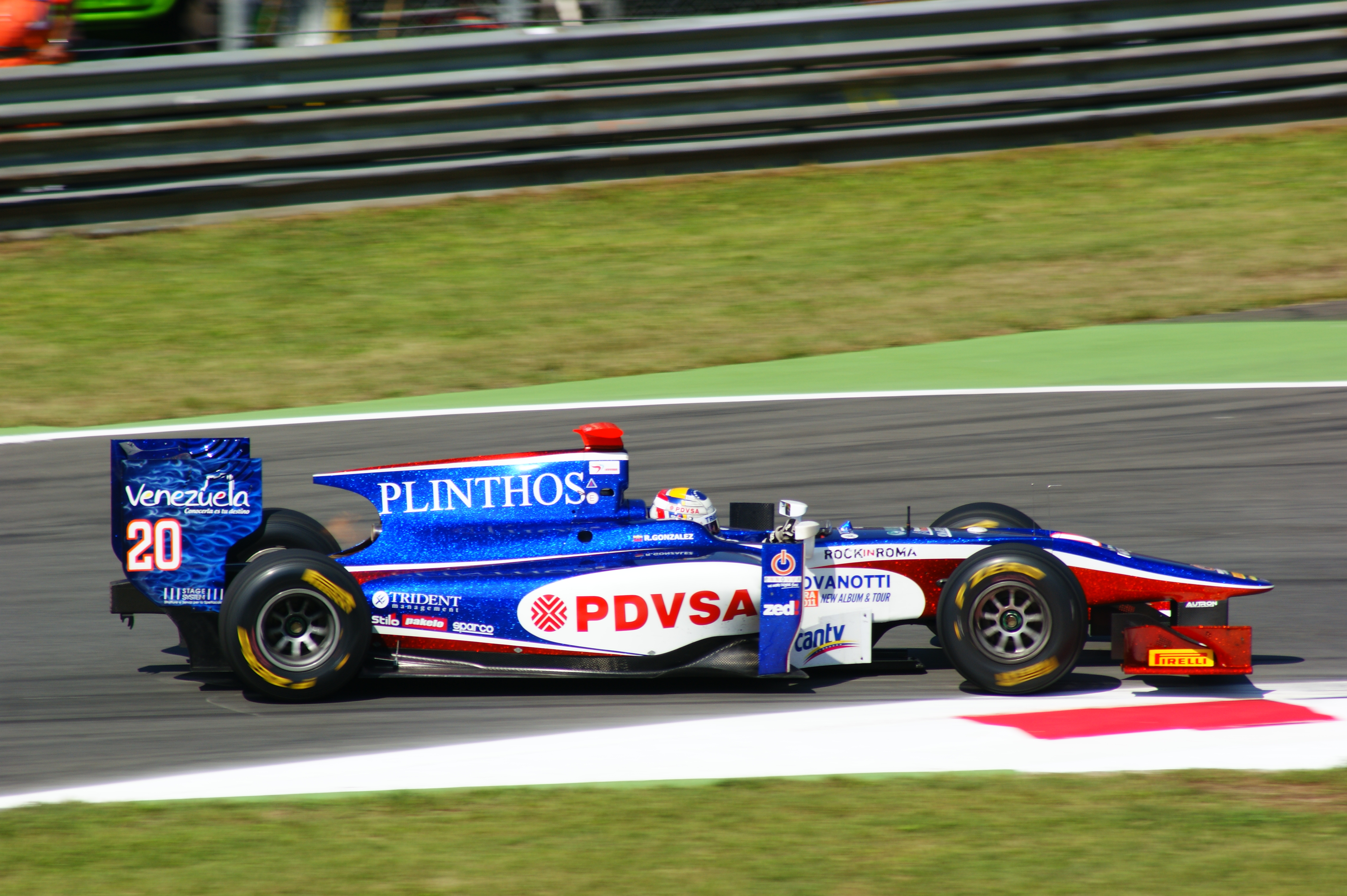
González driving for Trident at the Monza round of the 2011 GP2 Series season.

González replaced Andreas Zuber for the third round of the 2008–09 GP2 Asia Series season at Sakhir, and finished sixteenth in his first race. He eventually wound up 23rd in the championship, with a best finish of eighth in the sprint race at Sepang.

González entered the main GP2 Series for the first time as a replacement for Davide Rigon at Trident Racing for the German rounds.

González also competed in Euroseries 3000 in 2009, finishing in fifth position.

González raced for Arden International in the first round of the 2009–10 GP2 Asia Series season before being replaced by Javier Villa. He returned at the final round in Bahrain, replacing Sergio Pérez at Barwa Addax.

González returned to Arden for the 2010 GP2 Series season alongside Charles Pic. He scored four points and finished 21st in the drivers' championship. For 2011, he moved to Trident Racing, where he competed alongside Stefano Coletti. He finished seventeenth in the Asia series and 26th in the main series. He was then signed by Caterham Racing alongside Giedo van der Garde for the 2012 season, in which he finished 22nd in the championship.

=== Formula One ===
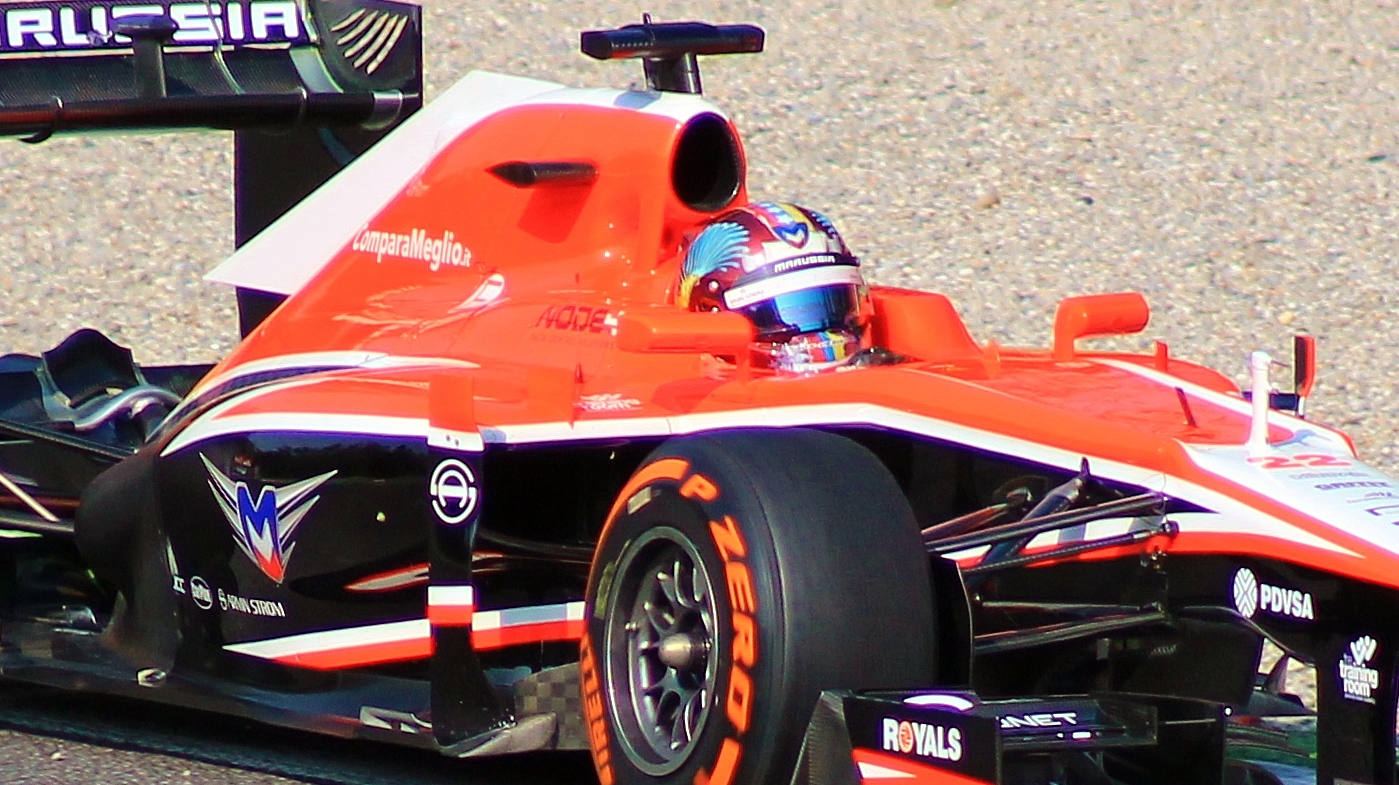
González testing at the 2013 Italian Grand Prix.

In 2010, González was given a drive in the Lotus T127 at the end-of-season young driver test in Abu Dhabi, alongside Bulgarian Vladimir Arabadzhiev.

On 14 March 2013, Marussia F1 announced that González would be the team's reserve driver for the 2013 Formula One season. He drove in the practice sessions at the Hungarian, Italian and Korean Grands Prix for Marussia, notably crashing in the latter.

=== Endurance racing ===
González competed in the 2014 ELMS Championship with the Murphy Prototypes Endurance Racing Team in the LMP2 category, and the 2014 Le Mans Classic.

=== IndyCar ===
González tested IndyCar Series cars in the 2014–2015 off-season with Schmidt Peterson Motorsports and Dale Coyne Racing. He was a surprise addition to the IndyCar Series entry list in the fourth round of the 2015 IndyCar Series season at Barber Motorsports Park in the Dale Coyne No. 18 entry. He then ran five more races that year, getting a best finish of ninth at the season ending race at Sonoma Raceway.

=== Return to racing ===
In 2023, González was announced to drive for Idola Motorsport in the Britcar Prototype Cup in a Praga R1 with Ruben Stanislau. He won the opening race of the season at Silverstone.

== Racing record ==
=== Career summary ===
Season	Series	Team name	Races	Wins	Poles	F/Laps	Podiums	Points	Position
2003	British Formula Ford Winter Series		4	0	0	?	0	0	NC
2003	Formula Renault UK Winter Series	Manor Motorsport	4	0	0	0	0	6	19th
2004	Formula Renault UK	Paston Racing	7	0	0	0	0	72	21st
2004	Formula Renault UK	Mark Burdett Motorsport	8	0	0	0	0	72	21st
2004	Formula Renault UK Winter Series	Mark Burdett Motorsport	4	0	0	0	0	41	10th
2005	Formula Renault UK	Manor Motorsport	20	0	0	0	1	235	9th
2005	Formula Renault 2.0 Netherlands	Manor Motorsport	4	0	0	?	0	18	23rd
2005	Formula Renault UK Winter Series	Mark Burdett Motorsport	4	0	0	0	0	32	13th
2006	British Formula 3 Championship – National Class	T-Sport	22	13	12	16	18	355	**1st**
2007	British Formula 3 Championship	T-Sport	22	0	0	1	1	77	11th
2008	Formula 3 Euro Series	Carlin Motorsport	18	0	0	1	0	0.5	24th
2008	Masters of Formula 3	Carlin Motorsport	1	0	0	0	0	N/A	9th
2008	Euroseries 3000	Sighinolfi Autoracing	2	0	0	0	0	3	20th
2008–09	GP2 Asia Series	Fisichella Motor Sport	8	0	0	0	0	0	23rd
2009	GP2 Series	Trident Racing	2	0	0	0	0	0	29th
2009	Euroseries 3000	Fisichella Motor Sport	13	1	1	1	4	44	5th
2009–10	GP2 Asia Series	Arden International	2	0	0	0	0	0	29th
2009–10	GP2 Asia Series	Barwa Addax Team	2	0	0	0	0	0	29th
2010	GP2 Series	Arden International	20	0	0	0	0	4	21st
2010	Formula One	Lotus F1 Racing	Test driver						
2011	GP2 Series	Trident Racing	18	0	0	0	0	0	26th
2011	GP2 Asia Series	Trident Racing	4	0	0	0	0	0	17th
2012	GP2 Series	Caterham Racing	24	0	0	0	0	6	22nd
2013	Formula One	Marussia F1 Team	Test driver						
2014	Formula Acceleration 1	Acceleration Team Venezuela	4	0	0	0	0	10	17th
2014	European Le Mans Series	Murphy Prototypes	3	0	0	0	1	20	14th
2014	24 Hours of Le Mans – LMP2	Murphy Prototypes	1	0	0	0	0	N/A	DNF
2015	IndyCar Series	Dale Coyne Racing	6	0	0	0	0	94	26th
2017	NASCAR Whelen Euro Series	Alex Caffi Motorsport	4	0	0	0	0	187	22nd
2023	Britcar Prototype Cup - Praga	Idola Motorsport	3	1	0	0	1	31	5th
2023	Sports Prototype Cup - Open Class	Idola Motorsport	4	0	0	0	2	N/A	**3rd**
2023	Prototype Challenge - CN	Idola Motorsport	4	1	1	1	2	59	**3rd**

^{*} Season still in progress.

=== Complete Formula Renault 2.0 UK Championship results ===
(key) (Races in bold indicate pole position) (Races in italics indicate fastest lap)

Year	Entrant	1	2	3	4	5	6	7	8	9	10	11	12	13	14	15	16	17	18	19	20	DC	Points
2004	Paston Racing	THR; 1; 19	THR; 2 Ret	BRH1; 1; 16	BRH1; 2 DNS	SIL; 1; 25	SIL; 2; 15	OUL; 1	OUL; 2	THR; 1; 20	THR; 2; 19											21st	72
2004	Mark Burdett Motorsport											CRO; 1; 16	CRO; 2; 16	KNO; 1; 12	KNO; 2; 14	BRH2; 1 DNS	BRH2; 2; 10	SNE; 1; 9	SNE; 2; 14	DON; 1 Ret	DON; 2 DNS	21st	72
2005	Manor Motorsport	DON; 1; 13	DON; 2; 9	THR; 1; 5	THR; 2; 7	BRH1; 1; 6	BRH1; 2; 7	OUL; 1; 3	OUL; 2; 18	CRO; 1; 5	CRO; 2; 8	SNE; 1; 10	SNE; 2; 9	KNO; 1; 9	KNO; 2; 10	DON; 1 DSQ	DON; 2; 18	SIL; 1; 10	SIL; 2; 10	BRH2; 1; 8	BRH2; 2 Ret	9th	334

=== Complete British Formula Three Championship results ===
(key) (Races in bold indicate pole position) (Races in italics indicate fastest lap)

Year	Entrant	Chassis	Engine	Class	1	2	3	4	5	6	7	8	9	10	11	12	13	14	15	16	17	18	19	20	21	22	DC	Points
2006	T-Sport	Dallara F304	Mugen-Honda	National	**OUL**; **1**; 11	**OUL**; **2**; 8	DON; 1; 13	**DON**; **2**; 7	**PAU**; **1**; 12	PAU; 2 Ret	**MON**; **1**; 14	**MON**; **2**; 13	**SNE**; **1**; 11	SNE; 2; 14	**SPA**; **1**; 14	**SPA**; **2**; 13	SIL; 1; 19	**SIL**; **2**; 14	BRH; 1; 13	BRH; 2; 16	**MUG**; **1**; 9	MUG; 2; 13	SIL; 1; 18	**SIL**; **2** Ret	**THR**; **1**; 10	THR; 2 Ret	1st	355
2007	T-Sport	Dallara F307	Mugen-Honda	Championship	OUL; 1; 7	OUL; 2; 9	DON; 1; 12	DON; 2; 6	BUC; 1; 10	BUC; 2; 10	SNE; 1; 5	SNE; 2 Ret	MNZ; 1; 18	MNZ; 2 Ret	BRH; 1; 4	BRH; 2; 18	SPA; 1; 5	SPA; 2; 10	SIL; 1 Ret	SIL; 2; 7	THR; 1; 7	THR; 2; 3	CRO; 1; 8	CRO; 2; 9	ROC; 1; 4	ROC; 2; 11	11th	77

=== Complete Formula 3 Euro Series results ===
(key) (Races in bold indicate pole position) (Races in italics indicate fastest lap)

Year	Entrant	Chassis	Engine	1	2	3	4	5	6	7	8	9	10	11	12	13	14	15	16	17	18	19	20	DC	Points
2008	Carlin Motorsport	Dallara F308/074	Mercedes	HOC; 1; 15	HOC; 2; 12	MUG; 1; 18	MUG; 2; 13	PAU; 1 Ret	PAU; 2; 21	NOR; 1; 12	NOR; 2 Ret	ZAN; 1; 24	ZAN; 2; 20	NÜR; 1; 21	NÜR; 2; 25	BRH; 1; 17	BRH; 2; 15	CAT; 1; 20	CAT; 2; 19	LMS; 1; 17	LMS; 2; 6	HOC; 1	HOC; 2	24th	0.5

=== Complete Euroseries 3000 results ===
(key) (Races in bold indicate pole position) (Races in italics indicate fastest lap)

Year	Entrant	1	2	3	4	5	6	7	8	9	10	11	12	13	14	15	16	DC	Points
2008	Sighinolfi Autoracing	VLL; 1	VLL; 2	SPA; 1	SPA; 2	VAL; 1	VAL; 2	MUG; 1	MUG; 2	MIS; 1	MIS; 2	JER; 1	JER; 2	CAT; 1	CAT; 2	MAG; 1 Ret	MAG; 2; 4	19th	3
2009	FMS International	ALG; 1 Ret	ALG; 2; 11	MAG; 1; 10	MAG; 2; 6	DON; 1 C	DON; 2 C	ZOL; 1; 1	ZOL; 2; 6	VAL; 1; 5	VAL; 2; 4	VAL; 3; 4	VLL; 1; 8	VLL; 2; 2	**MNZ**; **1**; 2	MNZ; 2; 3		5th	44

=== Complete GP2 Series results ===
(key) (Races in bold indicate pole position) (Races in italics indicate fastest lap)

Year	Entrant	1	2	3	4	5	6	7	8	9	10	11	12	13	14	15	16	17	18	19	20	21	22	23	24	DC	Points
2009	Trident Racing	CAT; FEA	CAT; SPR	MON; FEA	MON; SPR	IST; FEA	IST; SPR	SIL; FEA	SIL; SPR	NÜR; FEA; 15	NÜR; SPR; 19	HUN; FEA	HUN; SPR	VAL; FEA	VAL; SPR	SPA; FEA	SPA; SPR	MNZ; FEA	MNZ; SPR	ALG; FEA	ALG; SPR					29th	0
2010	Arden International	CAT; FEA; 15	CAT; SPR; 14	MON; FEA; 10	MON; SPR; Ret	IST; FEA; 16	IST; SPR; 16	VAL; FEA; Ret	VAL; SPR; Ret	SIL; FEA; 16	SIL; SPR; 20	HOC; FEA; 18	HOC; SPR; Ret	HUN; FEA; Ret	HUN; SPR; 15	SPA; FEA; 8	SPA; SPR; 4	MNZ; FEA; Ret	MNZ; SPR; Ret	YMC; FEA; 10	YMC; SPR; 16					21st	4
2011	Trident Racing	IST; FEA; Ret	IST; SPR; 22	CAT; FEA; 20	CAT; SPR; 10	MON; FEA; Ret	MON; SPR; 14	VAL; FEA; 15	VAL; SPR; Ret	SIL; FEA; 18	SIL; SPR; 13	NÜR; FEA; 9	NÜR; SPR; 15	HUN; FEA; Ret	HUN; SPR; 9	SPA; FEA; Ret	SPA; SPR; 17	MNZ; FEA; 19	MNZ; SPR; 16							26th	0
2012	Caterham Racing	SEP; FEA; Ret	SEP; SPR; 18	BHR1; FEA; 15	BHR1; SPR; 20	BHR2; FEA; 18	BHR2; SPR; 15	CAT; FEA; 15	CAT; SPR; 14	MON; FEA; 13	MON; SPR; 5	VAL; FEA; 15	VAL; SPR; 15	SIL; FEA; 23	SIL; SPR; Ret	HOC; FEA; 23	HOC; SPR; 20	HUN; FEA; 23	HUN; SPR; 16	SPA; FEA; Ret	SPA; SPR; 14	MNZ; FEA; 22	MNZ; SPR; 20	MRN; FEA; Ret	MRN; SPR; 18	22nd	6

==== Complete GP2 Asia Series results ====
(key) (Races in bold indicate pole position) (Races in italics indicate fastest lap)

Year	Entrant	1	2	3	4	5	6	7	8	9	10	11	12	DC	Points
2008–09	FMS International	SHI; FEA	SHI; SPR	DUB; FEA	DUB; SPR	BHR1; FEA; 16	BHR1; SPR; Ret	LSL; FEA; Ret	LSL; SPR; 19	SEP; FEA; 10	SEP; SPR; 8	BHR2; FEA; Ret	BHR2; SPR; Ret	23rd	0
2009–10	Arden International	YMC1; FEA; 14	YMC1; SPR; 16	YMC2; FEA	YMC2; SPR	BHR1; FEA	BHR1; SPR							29th	0
2009–10	Barwa Addax Team							BHR2; FEA; Ret	BHR2; SPR; Ret					29th	0
2011	Trident Racing	YMC; FEA; 11	YMC; SPR; 9	IMO; FEA; 10	IMO; SPR; Ret									17th	0

=== Complete Formula One participations ===
(key) (Races in bold indicate pole position) (Races in italics indicates fastest lap)

Year	Entrant	Chassis	Engine	1	2	3	4	5	6	7	8	9	10	11	12	13	14	15	16	17	18	19	WDC	Points
2013	Marussia F1 Team	Marussia MR02	Cosworth CA2013 2.4 V8	AUS	MAL	CHN	BHR; TD	ESP; TD	MON	CAN	GBR	GER; TD	HUN; TD	BEL	ITA; TD	SIN	KOR; TD	JPN	IND	ABU; TD	USA; TD	BRA; TD	–	–

=== 24 Hours of Le Mans results ===
Year	Team	Co-Drivers	Car	Class	Laps	Pos.	Class Pos.
2014	(Republic of Ireland) Murphy Prototypes	(France) Nathanaël Berthon (India) Karun Chandhok	Oreca 03R-Nissan	LMP2	73	DNF	DNF

=== Complete Formula Acceleration 1 results ===
(key) (Races in bold indicate pole position) (Races in italics indicate fastest lap)

Year	Team	1	2	3	4	5	6	7	8	9	10	Pos	Points
2014	Venezuela	ALG; 1; 11	ALG; 2; 11	NAV; 1; 5	NAV; 2; 9	NÜR; 1	NÜR; 2	MMNZ; 1	MNZ; 2	ASS; 1	ASS; 2	17th	10

=== Complete European Le Mans Series results ===
Year	Entrant	Class	Chassis	Engine	1	2	3	4	5	Rank	Points
2014	Murphy Prototypes	LMP2	Oreca 03	Nissan VK45DE 4.5 L V8	SIL; 8	IMO; Ret	RBR	**LEC**; 3	EST	14th	20

=== Complete IndyCar Series results ===
(key)

Year	Team	No.	Chassis	Engine	1	2	3	4	5	6	7	8	9	10	11	12	13	14	15	16	Rank	Points	Ref
2015	Dale Coyne Racing	18	Dallara DW12	Honda	STP	NLA	LBH	ALA; 20	IMS	INDY	DET; 21	DET; 22	TXS	TOR; 18	FON	MIL	IOW	MDO; 20	POC	SNM; 9	26th	94	

=== Complete NASCAR results ===
==== Whelen Euro Series – Elite 1 ====
(key) (Bold – Pole position. Italics – Fastest lap. * – Most laps led. ^ – Most positions gained)

NASCAR Whelen Euro Series – Elite 1 results
Year	Team	No.	Make	1	2	3	4	5	6	7	8	9	10	11	12	NWES	Pts
2017	Alex Caffi Motorsport	2	Toyota	VAL; 11	VAL; 8	BRH; 15	BRH; 11	VEN	VEN	HOC	HOC	FRA	FRA	ZOL	ZOL	22nd	187
