= Lucchini P1-98 =

Sports prototype race car

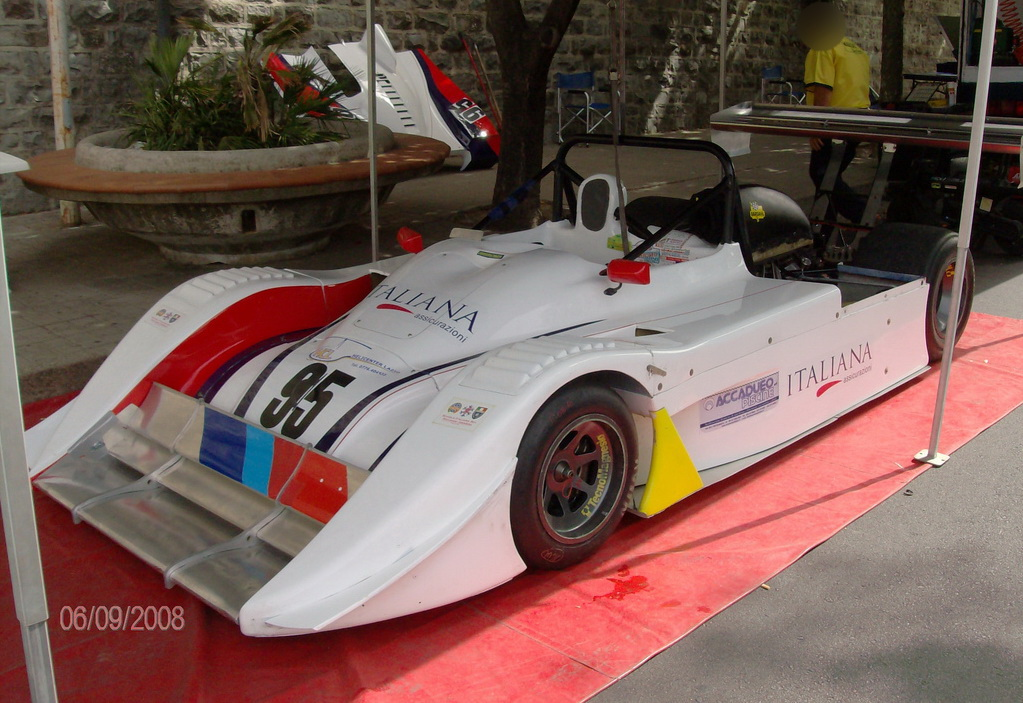
- Category: CN

Technical specifications
- Chassis: Carbon fiber and aluminum honeycomb monocoque chassis
- Suspension: Unequal length wishbones, pushrod actuated coil springs over shock absorbers, inboard rocker arms, anti-roll bars
- Length: 4,500 mm (180 in)
- Width: 1,900 mm (75 in)
- Engine: Alfa Romeo 3.0 L (183.1 cu in) 60° DOHC V6 naturally-aspirated mid-engined
- Transmission: Hewland NMT 6-speed sequential manual
- Power: 450 hp (340 kW)
- Weight: 720 kg (1,590 lb)

Competition history
- Debut: 1998 International Sports Racing Series Brno

The Lucchini P1-98 is a series of sports prototype race cars, designed, developed, and built by Italian manufacturer Lucchini Engineering, for sports car racing, conforming to the FIA's CN class, and produced in 1998.
