= 2011 Silverstone 24 Hours =

2011 endurance sports car race

Map of the Silverstone Grand Prix Circuit

The 2011 Britcar 24 Hour Race Silverstone was the 7th running of the Silverstone 24 Hours endurance sports car race held on October 1, 2011 at the Silverstone Circuit.

Victory overall and in Class 1 went to the No. 2 Michael McInerny Ferrari F430 GTC driven by Michael McInerny, Sean McInerny, and Phil Keen. Victory in Class 2 went to the No. 27 Topcats Racing Marcos Mantis GT3 driven by David Upton, Neil Huggins, Emily Fletcher, and Jamie Orton. Class 3 was won by the No. 49 Nicholas Mee Racing Aston Martin V8 Vantage GT4 driven by Karsten Le Blanc, Christiaen van Lanschot, Dan de Zille, and Robert Nimkoff. Finally, Class 4 was won by the No. 89 Mark Griffiths BMW M3 E46 driven by Mark Griffiths, William Green, David Forsbrey, and Bill Kirkpatrick.

== Race results ==
Class winners in bold.

Pos	Class	No	Team	Drivers	Car	Laps
1	**Class 1**	**2**	**(United Kingdom) Michael McInerny**	**(United Kingdom) Michael McInerny (United Kingdom) Sean McInerny (United Kingdom) Phil Keen**	**Ferrari F430 GTC**	**573**
2	**Class 3**	**49**	**(United Kingdom) Nicholas Mee Racing**	**(Netherlands) Karsten Le Blanc (Netherlands) Christiaen van Lanschot (United Kingdom) Dan de Zille (United States) Robert Nimkoff**	**Aston Martin V8 Vantage GT4**	**560**
3	Class 3	57	(Netherlands) Marcos Racing International	(Netherlands) Cor Euser (United States) Hal Prewitt (United States) Jim Briody (Netherlands) Dick Freeman (United Kingdom) Alistair MacKinnon	Lotus Evora Cup GT4	559
4	Class 3	53	(United Kingdom) Topcats Racing	(Japan) Yousuke Shimojima (Japan) Ryu Seya (Japan) Masashi Kakiuchi (Japan) Yasushi Kikuchi	Marcos Mantis GT3	542
5	Class 3	68	(United Kingdom) Kevin Clarke	(United Kingdom) Kevin Clarke (United Kingdom) Wayne Gibson (United Kingdom) Mark Radcliffe (United Kingdom) Adam Hayes	BMW M3 E46	532
6	Class 3	46	(United Kingdom) Pete Storey	(United Kingdom) Pete Storney (United Kingdom) Paul Kitson (United Kingdom) Ben Gower (United Kingdom) Mike Rowland	Lotus Elise GT4	529
7	**Class 4**	**89**	(United Kingdom) **Mark Griffiths**	(United Kingdom) **Mark Griffiths** (United Kingdom) **William Green** (United Kingdom) **David Forsbrey** (United Kingdom) **Bill Kirkpatrick**	**BMW M3 E46**	**527**
8	**Class 2**	**27**	(United Kingdom) **Topcats Racing**	(United Kingdom) **David Upton** (United Kingdom) **Neil Huggins** (United Kingdom) **Emily Fletcher** (United Kingdom) **Jamie Orton**	**Marcos Mantis GT3**	**522**
9	Class 1	6	(United Kingdom) Nigel Mustill	(United Kingdom) Nigel Mustill (United Kingdom) Bob Berridge (United Kingdom) Gareth Evans (United Kingdom) John Martin	Aquila CR1	521
10	Class 4	84	(Netherlands) Red Camel - Jordans.nl	(Netherlands) Ivo Breukers (Netherlands) Henk Thijssen (Japan) Adam Han (Singapore) Huw Jensien	SEAT León	521
11	Class 3	70	(Australia) Ryan McLeod	(Australia) Ryan McLeod (Australia) Ashley Walsh (Australia) Jamie Camilleri (United Kingdom) James Kaye (United Kingdom) Joseph Girlin	Holden Astra	518
12	Class 4	77	(United Kingdom) Dave Cox	(United Kingdom) Dave Cox (United Kingdom) Jason Cox (United Kingdom) Michael Cox (Australia) Paul Stubber	BMW M3 CSL	507
13	Class 4	82	(United Kingdom) Rob Carvell	(United Kingdom) Ian Carvell (United Kingdom) Rob Carvell (United Kingdom) Henry Wright (United Kingdom) Dave Carvell (Canada) Kevin Glover	Volkswagen Golf Mk3	502
14	Class 4	88	(United Kingdom) Mardi Gras Motorsport Ltd.	(United Kingdom) Desmond Smail (United Kingdom) Richard Meins (United Kingdom) Chris Lillington-Price (United Kingdom) Westlie Harding	Honda Integra (fourth generation)	501
15	Class 3	65	(United Kingdom) Sub-Zero Wolf	(United Kingdom) Craig Davies (United Kingdom) Adam Jones (United Kingdom) Lee Allen (United Kingdom) Greg Rose	SEAT León Supercopa	500
16	Class 4	75	(United Kingdom) Mazda Motors UK Ltd.	(United Kingdom) Andrew Frankel (United Kingdom) Ben Anderson (United Kingdom) Matt Prior (United Kingdom) Jethro Bovington	Mazda MX-5 GT	500
17	Class 3	64	(United Kingdom) Scuderia Vittoria	(United Kingdom) Dave Bennett (United Kingdom) Marcus Fothergill (United Kingdom) Sam Allpass (United Kingdom) Adam Dawson (Spain) Carlos Erimon	Porsche 996 GT3 Cup	493
18	Class 3	59	(United Kingdom) Mike Brown	(United Kingdom) Mike Brown (United Kingdom) Dave West (United Kingdom) Paul Cripps (United Kingdom) Jamie Wall	Aston Martin V8 Vantage N24	490
19	Class 3	66	(United Kingdom) Paul Winter	(United Kingdom) Paul Winter (United Kingdom) Graham Mundy (United Kingdom) Peter Morris (United Kingdom) Tim Speed (United Kingdom) Timothy Raven	Porsche 996 GT3 Cup	482
20 DNF	Class 1	3	(United Kingdom) Topcats Racing	(United Kingdom) Andrew Beaumont (United Kingdom) Henry Fletcher (United Kingdom) Julien Draper (United Kingdom) Freddie Hetherington	Mosler MT900 R GT3	481
21	Class 4	95	(United States) Jet Black Racing	(Denmark) Anders Majgaard (Denmark) Ronnie Bremer (Denmark) Jackie Boellingtoft (Denmark) Dan Trager	Renault Clio	480
22	Class 4	80	(United Kingdom) Synchro Motorsports	(Japan) Kouichi Okumura (United Kingdom) Daniel Wheeler (United Kingdom) Andrew Hack (United Kingdom) Tim Stanbridge	Honda Civic Type R	479
23	Class 4	90	(United Kingdom) Dominic Malone	(United Kingdom) Nigel Rata (United Kingdom) Matthew West (United Kingdom) Dominic Malone (United Kingdom) Giles Groombridge	BMW M3 E46	476
24	Class 4	86	(United Kingdom) Mazda Motors UK Ltd.	(United Kingdom) James Cameron (United Kingdom) Mike Hickson (United Kingdom) Mike Browning (United Kingdom) Tony Jardine	Mazda MX-5 GT	475
25	Class 4	78	(United Kingdom) Andre Severs	(United Kingdom) Andre Severs (Republic of Ireland) Pete James (United Kingdom) Malcolm MacAdam (United Kingdom) Mark Heywood	SEAT Toledo	471
26	Class 4	94	(United Kingdom) Rollcentre Racing	(United Kingdom) Richard Sykes (United Kingdom) Jake Rattenbury (United Kingdom) Brian Saunders (United Kingdom) Mark Davies	Ginetta G40	466
27	Class 3	54	(United Kingdom) Clint Bardwell	(United Kingdom) Mark Poole (United Kingdom) Richard Abra (United Kingdom) Clint Bardwell (United Kingdom) "White"	BMW M3 E46	463
28	Class 4	92	(United Kingdom) Smarts4you Racing	(United Kingdom) Paul Bates (United Kingdom) James Palmer (United Kingdom) David Moore (United Kingdom) Tom Mills	Smart Forfour	456
29	Class 4	93	(United Kingdom) Alfatune	(United Kingdom) John Clonis (United Kingdom) Phil Brough (United Kingdom) Chris Bentley (United Kingdom) David Kingham	BMW 330d	434
30	Class 3	56	(Denmark) VHA Trim Motorsports	(Denmark) Tom Pedersen (Denmark) Kim Holmgaard (Denmark) Michael Klostermann (Denmark) Christian Daluoiso (Denmark) Jacques Moller	BMW M3 E46	432
31	Class 4	85	(United Kingdom) Bob Stockley	(United Kingdom) Bob Stockley (United Kingdom) Malcolm Edeson (United Kingdom) Gary Fletcher (United Kingdom) Nick Bowers	Honda Civic	430
32	Class 4	87	(United Kingdom) Saxon Motorsport	(United Kingdom) John Mawdsley (United Kingdom) Marcus Mahy (United Kingdom) Simon Hill (United Kingdom) George Haynes	Honda Civic Type R	426
33	Class 3	47	(United Kingdom) Kevin Hancock	(United Kingdom) Kevin Hancock (United Kingdom) Leigh Smart (United Kingdom) Aaron Scott (United Kingdom) Craig Wilkins	Ginetta G50 GT4	419
34	Class 3	63	(United Kingdom) Jensun Lunn	(United Kingdom) Jensun Lunn (United Kingdom) Adam Sharpe (United Kingdom) Sarah Bennett-Baggs (United Kingdom) "Maher"	BMW M3 E36	411
35	Class 3	55	(Australia) Brett Niall	(United Kingdom) Archie Hamilton (Australia) Brett Niall (Australia) Nathan Callaghan (Australia) Clint Harvey	SEAT León Supercopa	409
36	Class 4	91	(United Kingdom) Piranha Motorsport	(United Kingdom) Chris Bialan (United Kingdom) Simon Mason (United Kingdom) Ryan Ratcliffe (United Kingdom) Adam Balon	Ginetta G40	388
37	Class 4	79	(United Kingdom) Synchro Motorsport	(United Kingdom) Dave Allan (United Kingdom) Alyn James (United Kingdom) Stephen Ritchie (United Kingdom) Daniel Ludlow	Honda Jazz Type R	366
38 DNF	Class 3	50	(United Kingdom) Tom Black	(United Kingdom) Tom Black (United Kingdom) Stuart Hall (United Kingdom) Alan Bonner	Aston Martin V8 Vantage N24	362
39 DNF	Class 3	52	(United States) Forza Motorsport 4/Toyota	(United Kingdom) Patrick Mortell (United Kingdom) Alric Kitson (United Kingdom) Simon Aris (United Kingdom) Lee McKee	Toyota MR-2 Roadster	335
40 DNF	Class 1	1	(United Kingdom) Witt Gamski	(United Kingdom) Witt Gamski (United Kingdom) Keith Robinson (United Kingdom) John Gaw (United Kingdom) Phil Dryburgh	Ferrari F430 GTC	333
41	Class 4	99	(United Kingdom) Robin Walker	(United Kingdom) Robin Walker (United Kingdom) Doug Cole (United Kingdom) Simon Byrne (United Kingdom) Ben Jacques	MG ZR 190	311
42 DNF	Class 3	48	(United Kingdom) Don Grice	(United Kingdom) Don Grice (United Kingdom) Mark Smith (United Kingdom) James McAllistair (United Kingdom) Ric Wood (United Kingdom) John Bussell	BMW M3 E46 GTR	303
43 DNF	Class 3	61	(United Kingdom) Scuderia Vittoria	(United Kingdom) Dan Denis (United Kingdom) Dan Jones (United Kingdom) Gavin Spencer (United Kingdom) James Thorpe	Ginetta G50 GT4	289
44 NC	Class 2	60	(United Kingdom) John Thorne	(United Kingdom) John Thorne (United Kingdom) Dan Watkins (United Kingdom) Roger Green (United Kingdom) Will Goff (United Kingdom) Matt Cummings	BMW M3 E92 GT3	171
45 NC	Class 3	45	(United Kingdom) Mazda Motors Ltd.	(United Kingdom) Mark Ticehurst (United Kingdom) Owen Mildenhall (United Kingdom) Mike Wilds	Mazda MX-5 GT	92
46 DNF	Class 1	7	(Germany) Marco Schelp	(Germany) Marco Schelp (Germany) Dominik Schwager (Germany) Michael Tischner (Netherlands) Donald Molenaar	BMW Z4	263
47 DNF	Class 1	4	(United Kingdom) Paul White	(United Kingdom) Paul White (United Kingdom) Calum Lockie (Spain) Manuel Cintrano (Spain) Javier Morcillo	Mosler MT900 R	261
48 DNF	Class 2	5	(Slovakia) ARC Bratislava	(Slovakia) Miro Konôpka (United Kingdom) Sean Edwards (New Zealand) Scott O'Donnell (Poland) Teodori Myszkowski (Poland) Andrzej Lewandowski	Porsche 997	255
49 DNF	Class 4	83	(United Kingdom) CTR Developments	(United Kingdom) Richard Chamberlain (United Kingdom) Zubin Randeria (United Kingdom) James Fillingham (United Kingdom) Jeremy Webb	Lotus Elise GT4	210
50 DNF	Class 3	62	(United Kingdom) BPM Racing Ltd.	(United Kingdom) Owen Thomas (United Kingdom) Ashley Woodman (United Kingdom) Rick Walker (United Kingdom) Rob Cullum	Ginetta G50 GT4	202
51 DNF	Class 4	81	(United Kingdom) Alex Osbourne	(United Kingdom) James May (United Kingdom) Alex Osbourne (United Kingdom) Guy Parr	SEAT León	187
52 DNF	Class 2	30	(United Kingdom) Rollcentre Racing	(United Kingdom) Martin Short (United Kingdom) Lawrence Tomlinson (United Kingdom) Colin Turkington (United Kingdom) Mike Simpson (United Kingdom) Matt Nicoll-Jones	Ginetta G55	80
53 DNF	Class 1	30	(United Kingdom) Mac G Racing	(United Kingdom) Jonathan MacGregor (United Kingdom) Jamie Smyth (United Kingdom) Adam Wilcox	Ultima GTR	75
54 DNF	Class 2	28	(United Kingdom) Fred Tonge	(United Kingdom) Fred Tonge (United Kingdom) Tim Hood (United Kingdom) Darren Dowling (United Kingdom) Steve Glynn (United Kingdom) David Mason (United Kingdom) Paul Smith	TVR Sagaris	71
55 DNF	Class 2	31	(United Kingdom) RJN Motorsport	(United Kingdom) Alex Buncombe (United Kingdom) Christopher Ward (United Kingdom) Jann Mardenborough (United Kingdom) Bryan Heitkotter	Nissan 370Z	50
56 DNF	Class 3	51	(United Kingdom) Optimum Motorsport	(United Kingdom) Lee Mowle (United Kingdom) Joe Osborne (United Kingdom) Gary Simms (United Kingdom) Stewart Linn	Ginetta G50 GT4	42
57 DNF	Class 3	58	(South Africa) Peter Fairbairn	(South Africa) Peter Fairbairn (United Kingdom) Tony Littlejohn (United Kingdom) Paul McLean (United Kingdom) Paul Follett	Porsche 993 Carrera RSR	24
