= Aquila CR1 =

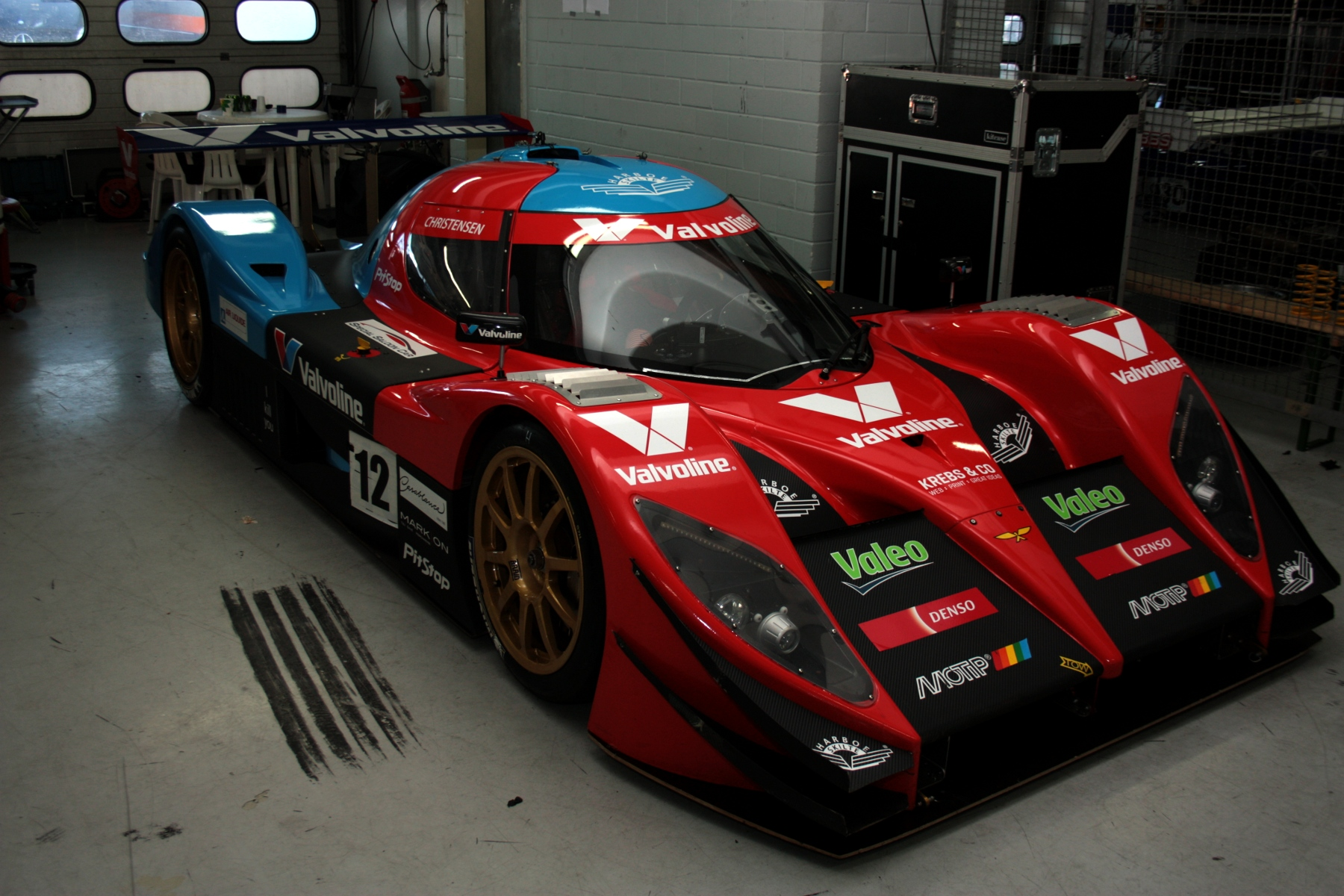
- Category: Sports car racing
- Constructor: Aquila Racing Cars

Technical specifications
- Chassis: Carbon-fiber composite body over aluminum monocoque
- Suspension (front): double wishbones, push-rod actuated coil springs over shock absorbers, anti-roll bar
- Suspension (rear): reversed lower wishbones, top links, push-rod actuated coil springs over shock absorbers, anti-roll bar
- Height: 1,025 mm (40.4 in)
- Wheelbase: 18”X10” front / 18”X12” rear
- Engine: BMW M60B40 4.0 L (244 cu in) DOHC V8 naturally-aspirated mid-engined LS1/LS3/LS7 5.7–7.0 L (348–427 cu in) OHV V8 naturally-aspirated mid-engined
- Transmission: Hewland NLT 6-speed sequential semi-automatic
- Power: 300–600 hp (220–450 kW); 310–530 lb⋅ft (420–720 N⋅m)
- Weight: 890 kg (1,960 lb)
- Brakes: Ventilated brake discs all-round

Competition history

The Aquila CR1 is a sports racing car, designed, developed and built by Danish manufacturer Aquila, since 2008.

== Background ==
Four engines are available for the CR1 from the factory; a 4.0-litre BMW M60 V8 producing 315 hp (235 kW; 319 PS), a LS1 V8, LS3 V8, and a 7.0-litre LS7 V8 producing 550 hp (410 kW; 560 PS).

The CR1 was featured in the initial release of the RaceRoom racing simulator.

== Racing history ==
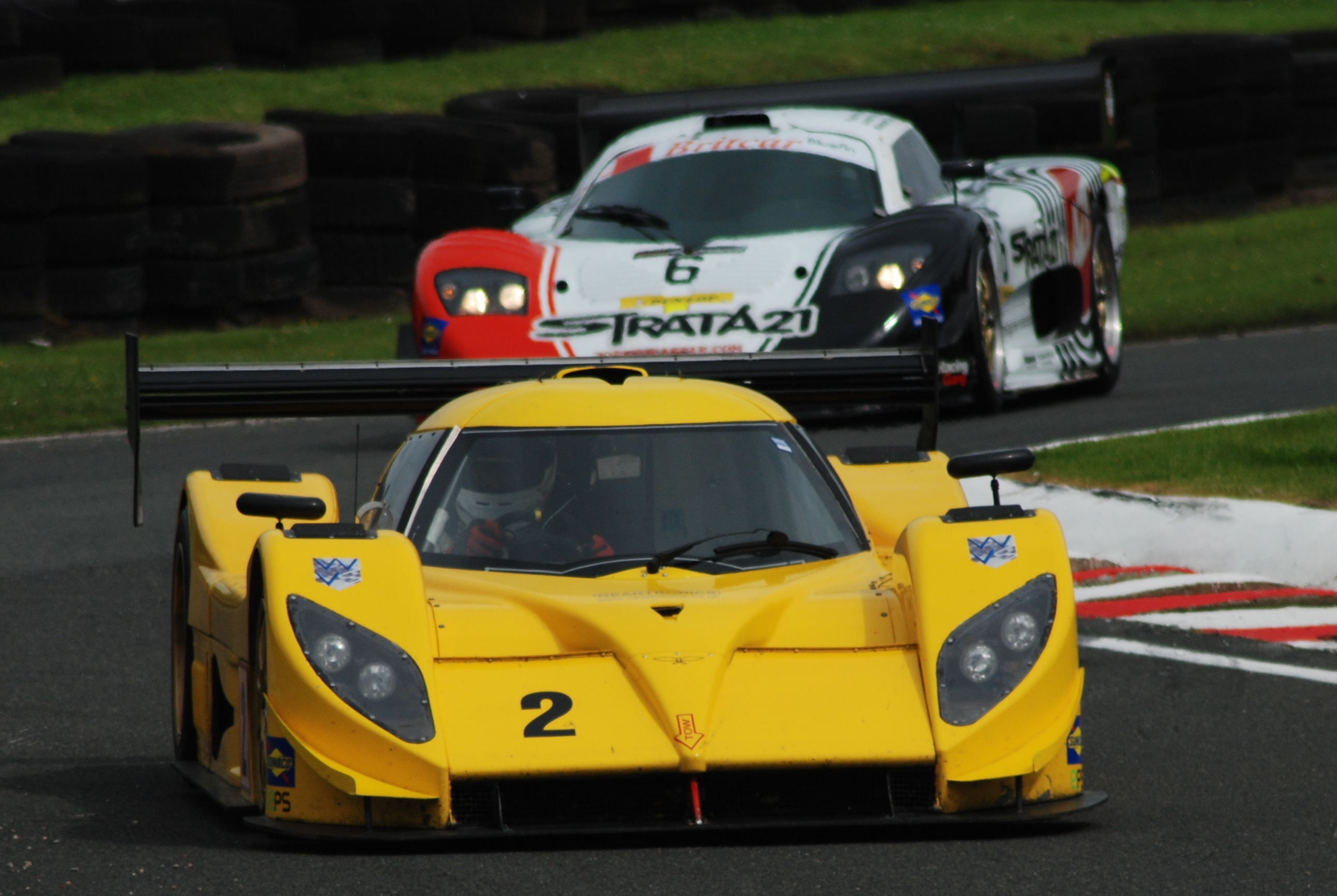
The Aquila CR1 racing against a Mosler MT900R at Oulton Park in Britcar.

The CR1 raced in Britcar for three seasons from 2010 to 2012, competing in select circuits.

In 2010, British team Wessex Vehicle Services entered the Britcar series with the CR1. That year, they also raced in Britcar's 2010 Silverstone 24 Hours event with the CR1, featuring Phil Bennett, Kelvin Burt, Robert Huff, and team owner Nigel Mustill as the driver lineup. Huff put the car on pole position for the race, however, the car did not finish the race due to a technical issue. Wessex Vehicle entered the series again the following year competing in select events, as well as the 2011 Silverstone 24 Hours, this time finishing the race with the CR1 in 9th overall and 2nd in class. In 2012, the CR1 won the season opener in Donington Park.

Latvian engineering company Drive eO developed a race car based on the CR1 in 2013, named the PP01, to compete in the Pikes Peak International Hill Climb. The PP01 was powered by four liquid-cooled YASA electric motors developing 540 hp (400 kW; 550 PS) and 2,200 lb⋅ft (3,000 N⋅m). The event saw mixed weather conditions, which caused touring car driver Jānis Horeliks to lose grip and go off-road in a left hand corner at the Halfway Picnic Grounds. A documentary called "Uzvaras cena" was produced about the project and was first aired in September 2013 on LTV7 during motoring programme "Tavs auto".

The CR1 has also participated in National Auto Sport Association events and the Dutch Supercar Challenge.
