= Y.O Concept =

French racecar constructor

- Company type: SARL
- Industry: Automotive
- Founded: 1999
- Founder: Yves Orhant
- Headquarters: Cornillé
- Website: Y.O Concept

Y.O Concept is a French racecar constructor based in Cornillé, Brittany. Y.O Concept produces Group CN sportscars under the Funyo brand. Y.O Concept was founded in 1999 by Yves Orhant.

== Racing cars ==
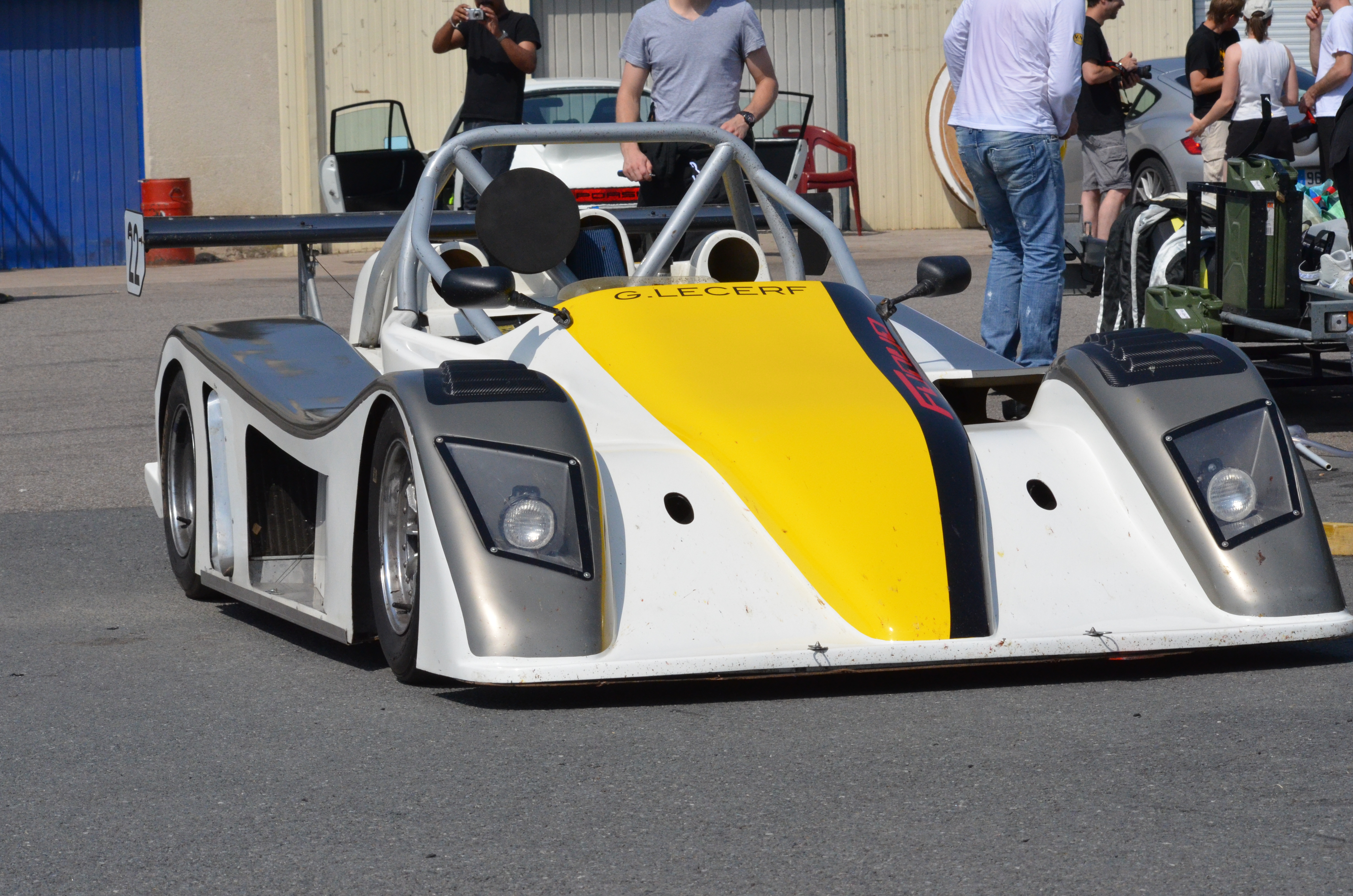
Funyo 4 RC

=== Funyo 4 ===
The Funyo 4 RC and its close relative the Funyo 4 RS are lightweight Group CN sportscars. The car is powered by a 2-liter Peugeot RCC engine. In 2008, 2009 and 2010 this car was the sole model in the V de V Funyo Challenge.

=== Funyo 5 ===
In 2011 the Funyo 5 was introduced. Updated aerodynamics are some of many improvements. This makes the car approximately 5 seconds a lap faster than the Funyo 4 on a circuit like Circuit de Barcelona-Catalunya. The car is designed to race with the Funyo 4 in the V de V Funyo Challenge.

=== Funyo 7 ===
The Funyo 7 is a more powerful Group CN / Group R3T sportscar. This car has a more powerful Peugeot EP6DTS turbo engine. This car is designed to compete in various Group CN classes like the SPEED EuroSeries and the V de V Proto Endurance series. The car made its debut in the 2009 V de V Proto Endurance series, driving a partial season entered by Y.O Concept. Two Funyo 7's were entered by HMC Loheac in the same championship in 2010. None of the Funyo 7's appeared in the following years.
