= Radical SR3 =

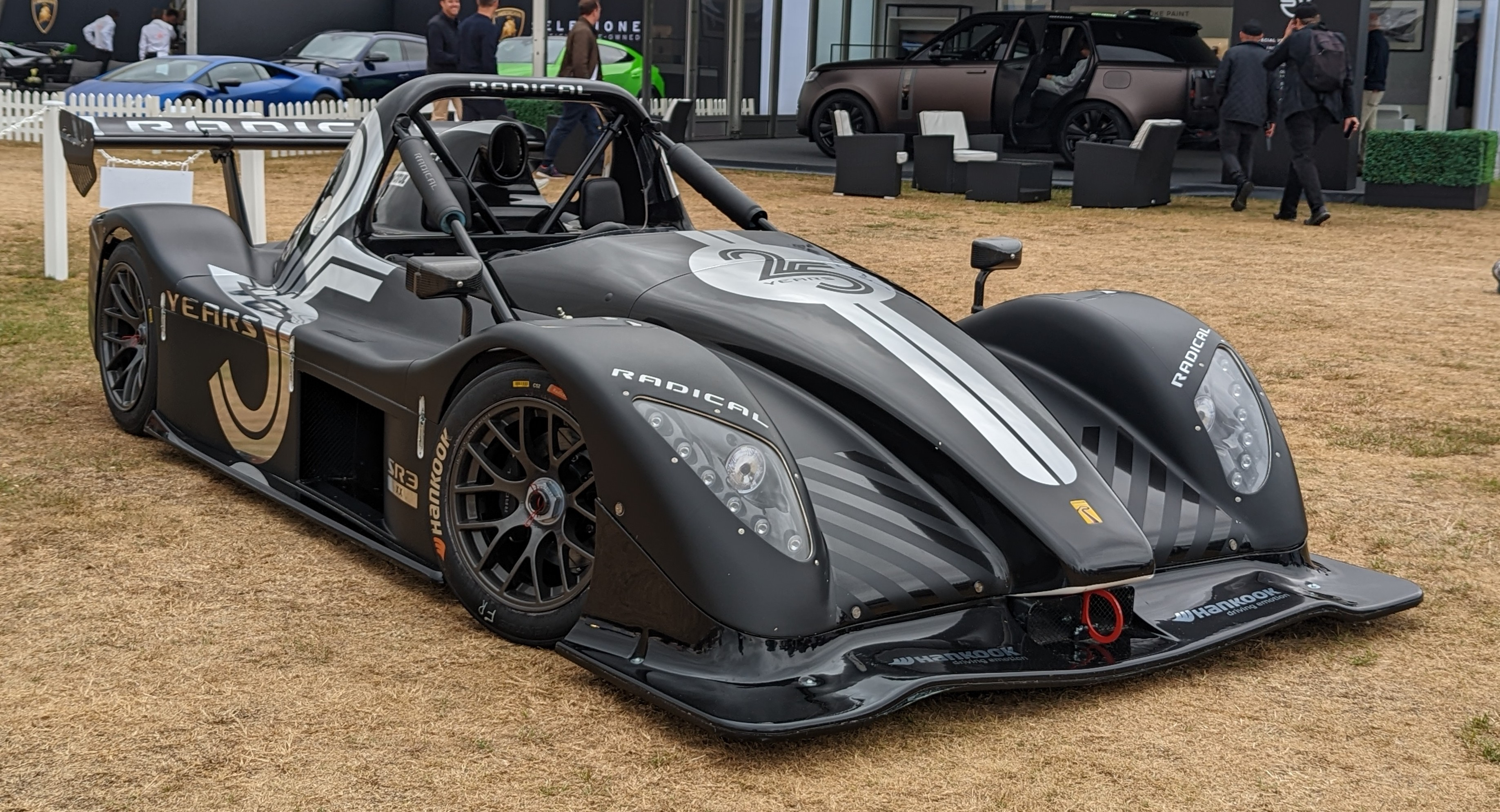
- Radical SR3 XX

Overview
- Manufacturer: Radical Sportscars
- Production: 2002–present
- Assembly: Peterborough, England
- Designer: Mike Pilbeam, Nick Walford

Body and chassis
- Class: Sports car
- Body style: Roadster
- Layout: longitudinal mounted mid-engine, rear-wheel drive
- Related: Radical SR4

Powertrain
- Engine: See below
- Transmission: 6-speed sequential manual

Dimensions
- Wheelbase: 2,370 mm (93.3 in)
- Length: 3,925–4,300 mm (154.5–169.3 in)
- Width: 1,760–1,800 mm (69.3–70.9 in)
- Height: 1,060–1,140 mm (41.7–44.9 in)

Chronology
- Predecessor: Radical Clubsport

The Radical SR3 is a race and sports car produced by Radical Sportscars, which has been built in Peterborough since 2002. The vehicle is considered a further development of the Clubsport 1100.

== History ==
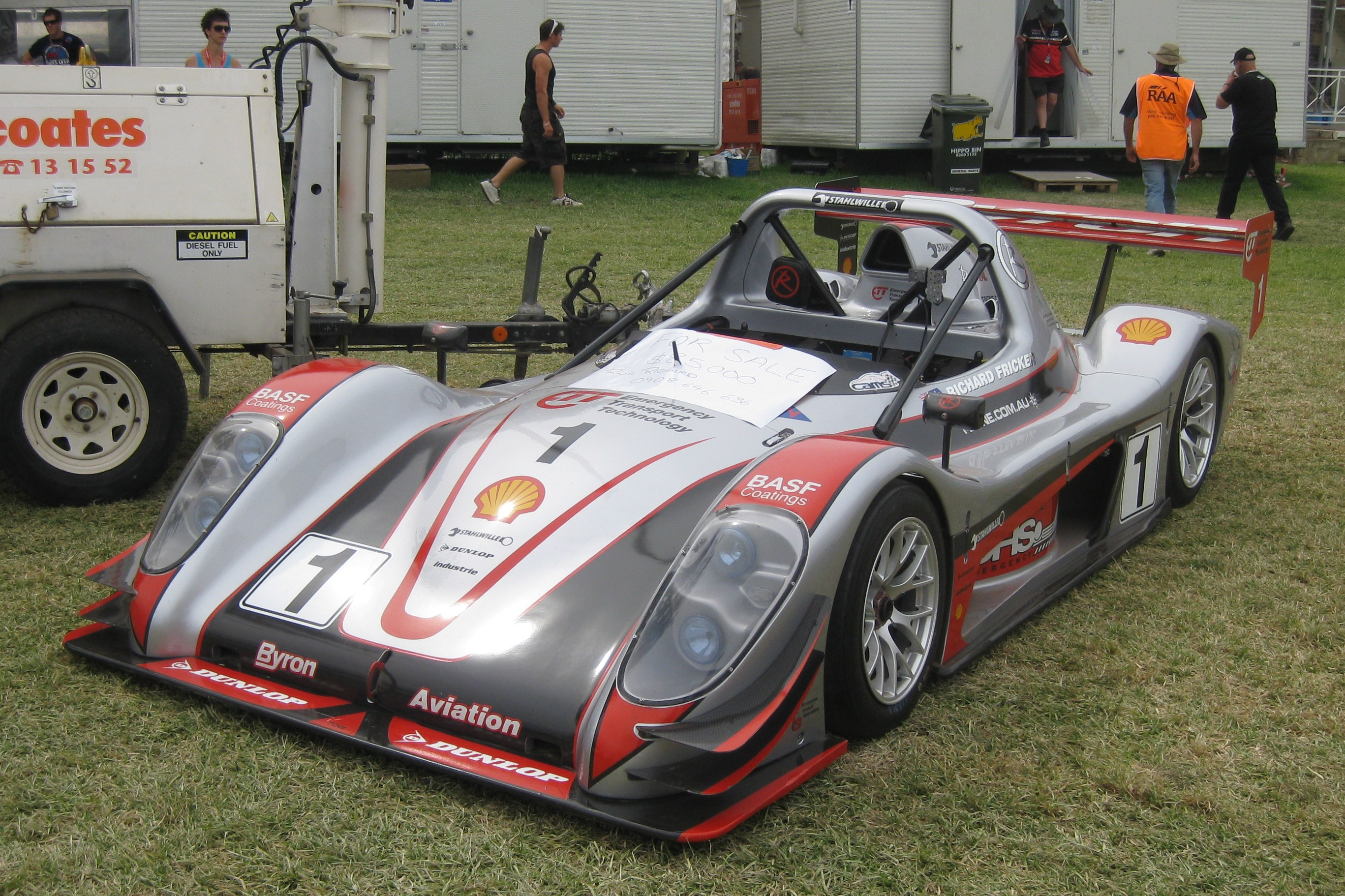
2010 Radical SR3

Designed by race car designer Mike Pilbeam, the SR3 is considered Radical's most successful model with over 1,100 units sold. The vehicle was originally developed for participation in international competitions in the C3 class of the FIA. In 2009, a further developed version of the Radical SR3 was presented. For the variant called Radical SR3 SL ( for "Street Legal" ), street legal for small series vehicles is also available.

In Autumn 2014, Radical presented a revised version of the racing version with the SR3 RSX.

== Specifications ==
The SR3 is extremely lightweight with a trellis chassis and weighs less than 600 kg (1,300 lb). The aerodynamic downforce allows cornering acceleration of up to 2 g at high speed. A roof or trunk is not available for the car. The racing bucket seats help to save weight. The SR3 can be ordered as left-hand or right-hand drive.

The engine from the Suzuki Hayabusa 1300 is used in the SR3 RS 1300, SR3 RS 1500 Turbo and SR3 RSX. The 2.0 L I4 Ford EcoBoost engine from the Focus ST powers the SR3 SL. The SR3 SL delivers 243 PS (179 kW). An increase in output to 304 PS (224 kW) is possible in the "Race Pack" for an additional charge. Since a heater is required to be street legal, it is installed in the SR3 SL. It also has footwell lighting and a 12-volt socket.

== Racing series ==
The SR3 can be raced in a variety of series, but is best known for its use in one-make Radical Cup series run by the manufacturer or their associates. Series are run in the UK, across Europe, North America, the Middle East, Asia and Australia.

== Engines ==
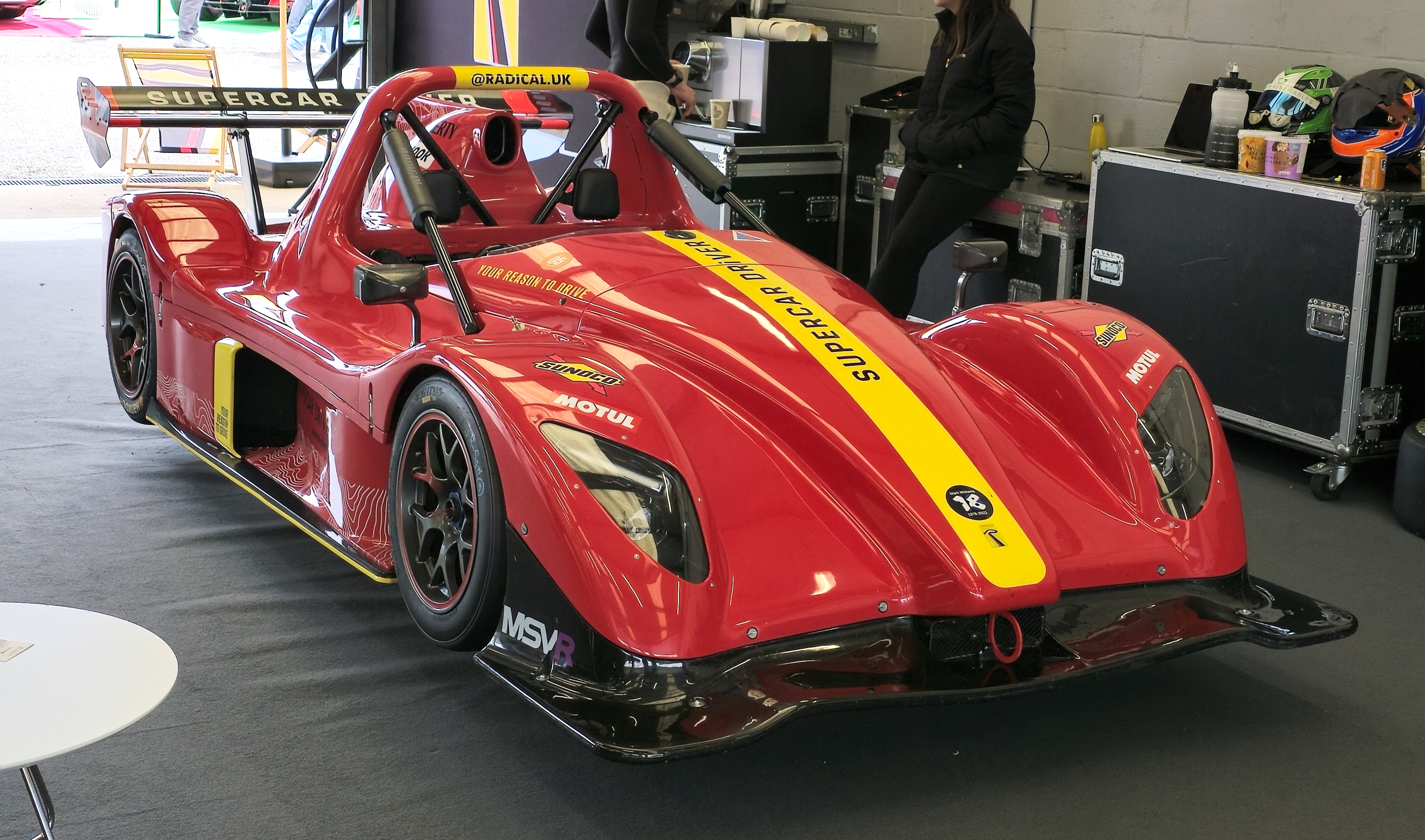
2024 Radical SR3 XXR

Name	Displacement	Engine	Horsepower	Torque	Weight
SR3	1,340 cc (82 cu in; 1.34 L)	Suzuki Hayabusa Inline-four	202 bhp (205 PS; 151 kW)	169 N⋅m (125 lb⋅ft)	495 kg (1,091 lb)
SR3 Turbo	1,500 cc (92 cu in; 1.5 L)	Powertec Inline-four Turbocharged	316 bhp (320 PS; 236 kW)	289 N⋅m (213 lb⋅ft)	500 kg (1,102 lb)
SR3 RS	1,340 cc (82 cu in; 1.34 L)	Suzuki Hayabusa Inline-four	210 bhp (213 PS; 157 kW)	180 N⋅m (133 lb⋅ft)	570 kg (1,257 lb)
SR3 SL (Road Version)	2,000 cc (120 cu in; 2.0 L)	Powertec Inline-four Turbocharged	240 bhp (243 PS; 179 kW) @ 6,000 rpm	359 N⋅m (265 lb⋅ft) @ 4,500 rpm	765 kg (1,687 lb)
SR3 SL (Track Version)	2,000 cc (120 cu in; 2.0 L)	Powertec Inline-four Turbocharged	300 bhp (304 PS; 224 kW)	375 N⋅m (277 lb⋅ft)	630 kg (1,389 lb)
SR3 SS 1500	1,500 cc (92 cu in; 1.5 L)	Powertec Inline-four NA	252 bhp (255 PS; 188 kW)	176 N⋅m (130 lb⋅ft)	495 kg (1,091 lb)
SR3 RSX	1,500 cc (92 cu in; 1.5 L)	Powertec Inline-four NA	256 bhp (260 PS; 191 kW)	173 N⋅m (128 lb⋅ft)	570 kg (1,257 lb)
SR3 1300	1,300 cc (79 cu in; 1.3 L)	Suzuki Hayabusa Inline-four	205 bhp (208 PS; 153 kW) @ 9,500 rpm	169 N⋅m (125 lb⋅ft) @ 6,500 rpm	495 kg (1,091 lb)
SR3 XX	1,340 cc (82 cu in; 1.34 L)	Suzuki Hayabusa Inline-four	226 bhp (229 PS; 169 kW)	258 N⋅m (190 lb⋅ft)	620 kg (1,367 lb)
SR3 XXR	1,500 cc (92 cu in; 1.5 L)	Powertec Inline-four	232 bhp (235 PS; 173 kW)	162.8 N⋅m (120.1 lb⋅ft)	620 kg (1,367 lb)
SR3 "Diesel King of Pikes Peak 100 Years edition"	1,968 cc (120.1 cu in; 1.968 L)	EA288 Derived Inline-four Triple Turbocharged	450 bhp (456 PS; 336 kW)	745 N⋅m (549 lb⋅ft)	725 kg (1,598 lb)
SR3 6.3 Supercharged	6,208 cc (378.8 cu in; 6.208 L)	Mercedes-Benz M156 V8 Supercharged	765 bhp (776 PS; 570 kW)	770 N⋅m (568 lb⋅ft)	520 kg (1,146 lb)
TMG EV P001	0 cc (0 cu in; 0 L)	two EVO Electric permanent magnet synchronous motors	375.5 bhp (280.0 kW)	800 N⋅m (590 lb⋅ft)	970 kg (2,138 lb)
