= Sadev =

French transmission manufacturer

- Type: Private
- Industry: Motorsport
- Founded: 1974
- Founder: Benoît Vincendeau
- Headquarters: Saint-Prouant, France
- Number of locations: 2
- Area served: Worldwide
- Products: Transmission systems (gears, gearboxes, transaxles, differentials)
- Production output: 1,500 gearboxes/year
- Number of employees: 200
- Website: sadev-tm.com

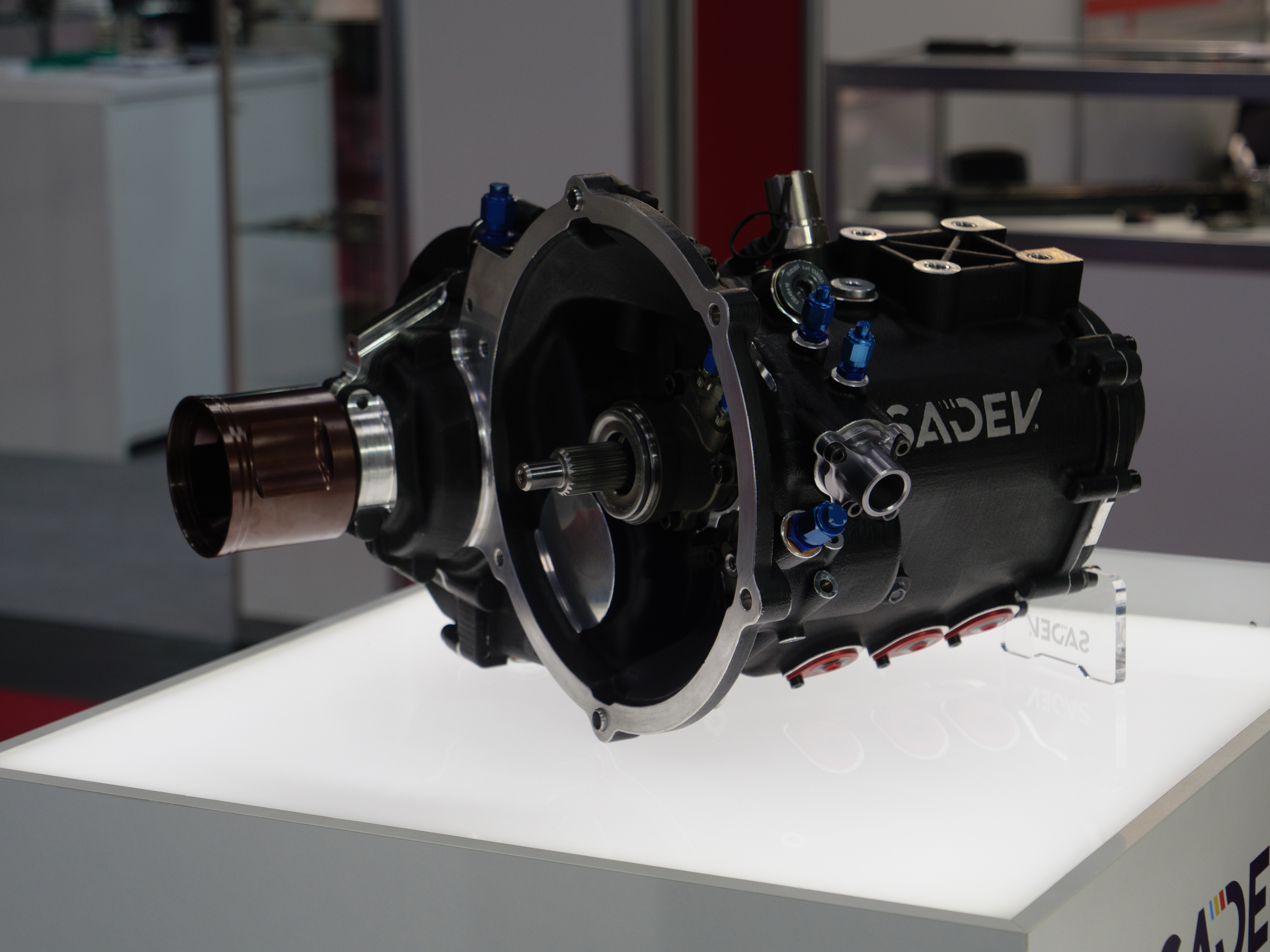
Sadev transmission

Sadev is a French company that designs and manufactures transmission systems for racing and high-performance vehicles.

Precision machining subcontractor and motorsports enthusiast Benoît Vincendeau established Sadev in 1974. By the early 1980s the company produced its first dog box racing transmission, securing wins in local autocross and rallycross events. Sadev expanded its capabilities over the next decade to produce its first sequential gearbox in 1996. The 2000s saw further growth and the implementation of heat treating, numerical controlled gear grinding, electron-beam welding, and finite element analysis techniques. Sadev supplied transmissions to S1600 and S2000 cars and became the official supplier to the WRC in 2011, WTCC in 2014, and also Formula E. Their transmissions serve in various other motorsports including World Rallycross and 80% of the participants of the Dakar Rally.

To support its growth, SADEV Racing Transmission created SADEV Industries, an international group of several companies selling their expertise and synergies to expand into new markets beyond motorsport.
