= Group CN =

Category of vehicles used in motorsport

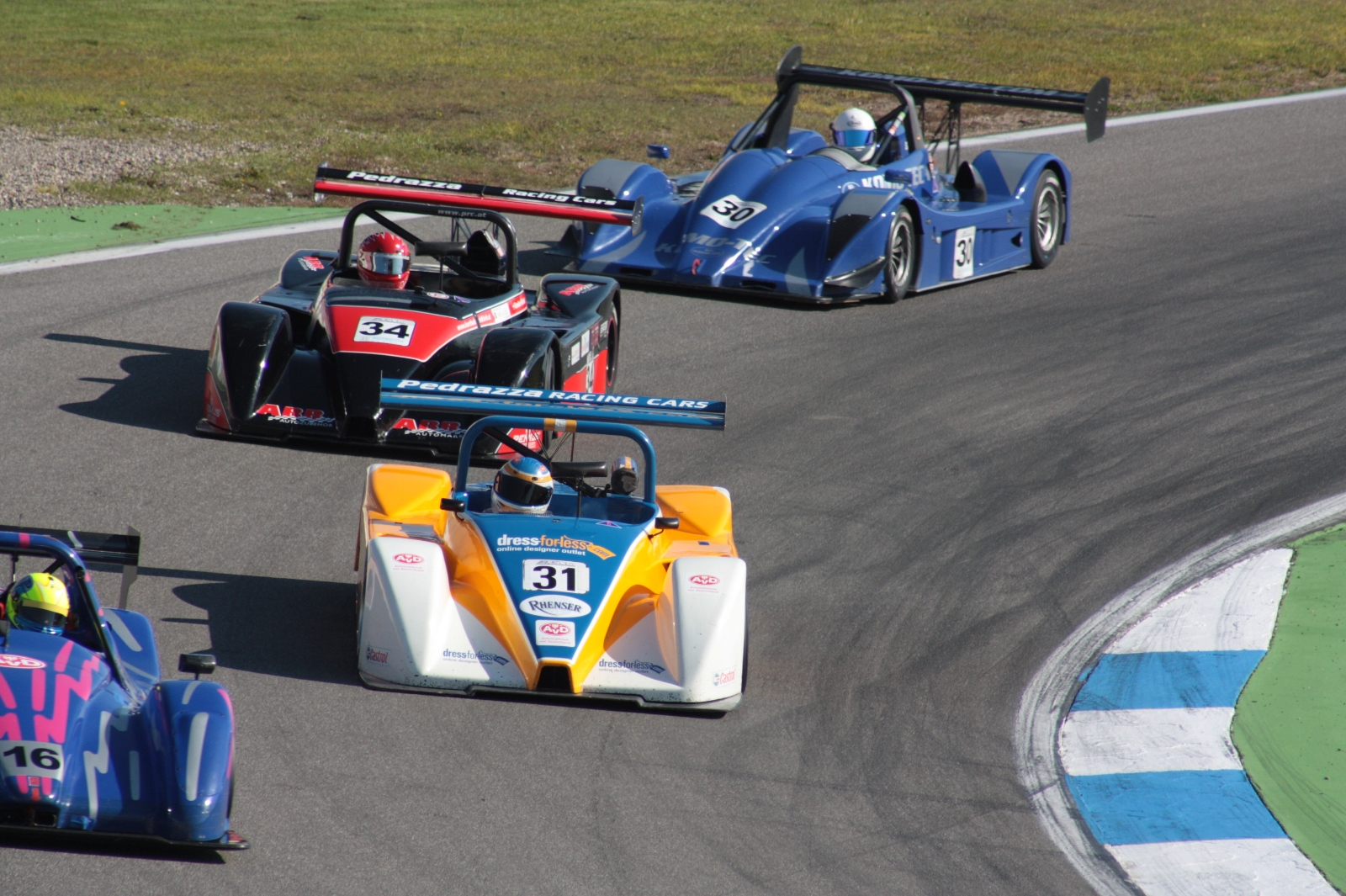
Radical Sportscars are a commonly-used vehicle in Group CN competition.

Group CN is a category of vehicles used in motorsport, introduced by the FIA in 1993 for sports car racing. Group CN cars are mainly used in hillclimbing championships or sports racing series. Group CM is a non-FIA class which is closely related to Group CN.

== Major racing series ==
Group CN rules are applied to a variety of championships. Many championships alter the rules in their own way like the Radical European Masters and V de V championships.

=== Radical European Masters ===
The Radical European Masters is a spec racing series in Europe. It features the Radical SR8, Radical RXC Spyder and Radical SR3, each in their own class.

=== V de V ===
The French-based V de V organisation features two FFSA Group CN based classes. The endurance championship is open for any chassis and engine within the regulations. The V de V organisation also features the Funyo Challenge open to Peugeot powered Funyo 4 or Funyo 5.

=== Indian Racing League ===
From 2022, the Indian Racing League has used Wolf GB08 "Thunder" models built to Group CN specification.

=== National championships ===
A Group CN racing class exists in many countries, many of which utilize radicals. Examples are the Radical UK Cup which features the Radical SR3 and the Open España Prototipos.

=== GT & Prototype Challenge ===
Ran as part of the Benelux-based Supercar Challenge, the GT & Prototype Challenge allows Group CN classification cars to compete; current competitors include the Radical SR3 and Norma M20 FC.

== FIA Group CN technical regulations ==
Engine	Maximum of 6 cylinders and 3000cc, homologated by the FIA in Group N.
Drivetrain	Free, with a maximum of 6 forward ratios. Reverse gear is compulsory.
Maximum dimensions	Length: 4800mm
Maximum dimensions	Width: 2000mm
Maximum dimensions	Height: 1030mm
Maximum dimensions	Front plus rear overhangs not to exceed 80% of the wheelbase.
Maximum dimensions	Difference between front and rear overhangs not to exceed 15% of the wheelbase.
Bodywork	Open or closed cockpit
Rear wing	Maximum of 2 elements, which must fit within a 150x400mm cross section. Maximum span of 1800mm
Minimum weight (without driver)	Related to engine capacity
Minimum weight (without driver)	Up to 1000cc: 475 kg
Minimum weight (without driver)	1000cc - 1300cc: 495 kg
Minimum weight (without driver)	1300cc - 1600cc: 515 kg
Minimum weight (without driver)	1600cc - 2000cc: 535 kg
Minimum weight (without driver)	2000cc - 2500cc: 575 kg
Minimum weight (without driver)	2500cc - 3000cc: 625 kg

== See also ==
- List of Group CN sports cars
