= Radical RXC =

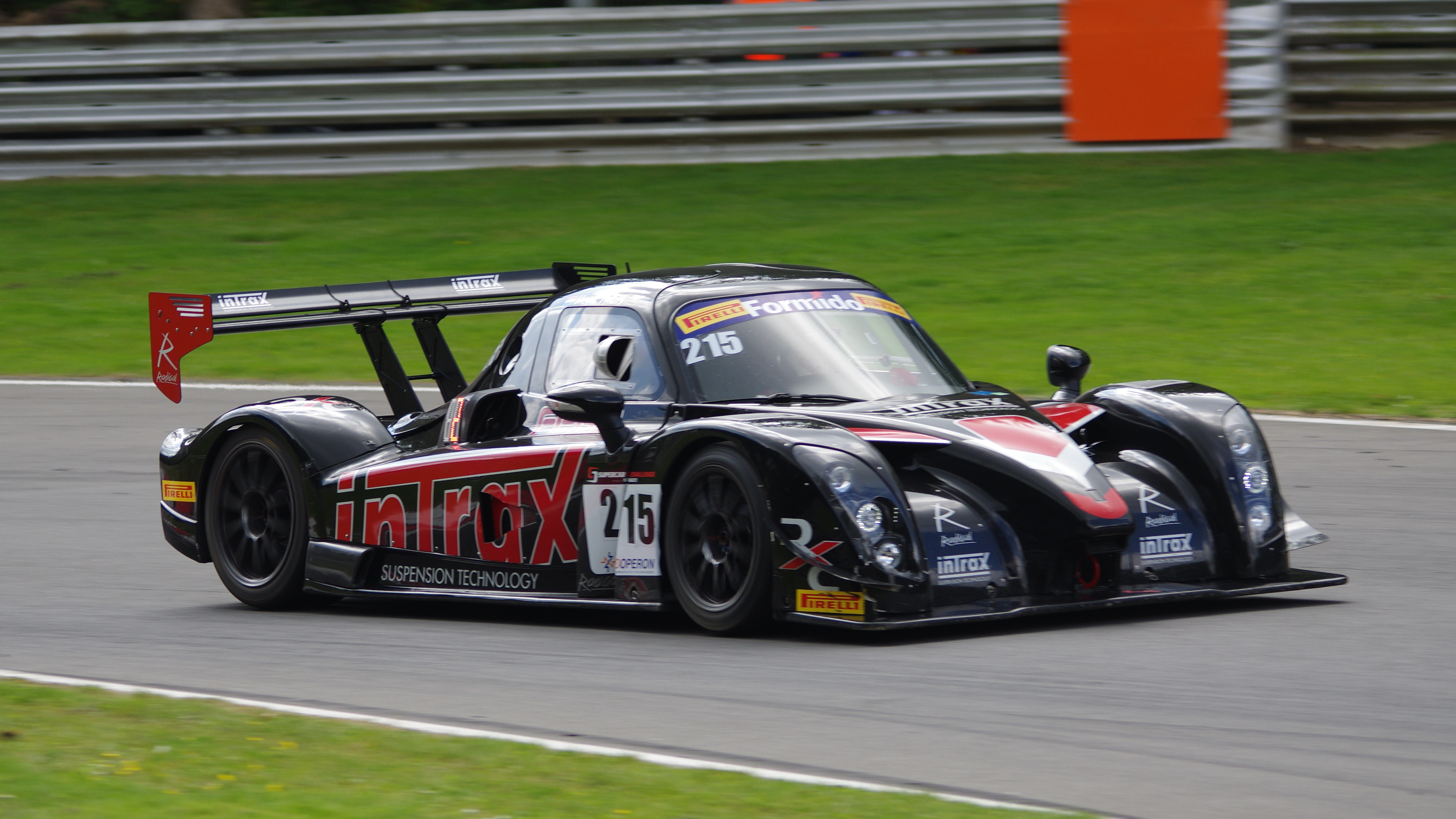
- Radical RXC 2.7 L V8

Overview
- Manufacturer: Radical Sportscars
- Production: 2013–present
- Assembly: Peterborough, Cambridgeshire, England
- Designer: Nick Walford, Vincent Rassat

Body and chassis
- Class: Sports car (S); Track day car
- Body style: 2-door coupé; 2-door convertible
- Layout: RMR layout
- Doors: Gull-wing doors

Powertrain
- Engine: 3.7 L Ford Duratec 37 Cyclone V6 (2013–2016); 2.7 L RPE RPX-V8 (2013–2016); 3.0 L RPE RPY-V8 (2013–2017); 3.5 L twin-turbocharged Ford EcoBoost V6 (2014–present)
- Transmission: 6-speed semi-automatic transmission; 7-speed semi-automatic transmission

Dimensions
- Wheelbase: 2,560 mm (100.8 in)
- Length: 4,300 mm (169.3 in)
- Width: 1,960 mm (77.2 in)
- Height: 1,127 mm (44.4 in)
- Kerb weight: 1,010 kg (2,227 lb) (RXC Spyder); 1,130 kg (2,491 lb) (RXC 600R); 1,130 kg (2,491 lb) (RXC GT); 1,170 kg (2,579 lb) (RXC GT3)

The Radical RXC is a line of track-only race cars and street-legal road cars built by British manufacturer Radical Sportscars. The first street-legal RXC was unveiled in January 2013 at the Autosport International auto show, and it has since been offered in many different engine and racing configurations.

== Models ==
=== RXC (2013–2016) ===
The original RXC launched in 2013 for the 2014 model year in two street-legal forms: the RXC V6 and the optional upgraded RXC V8. The standard V6, a modified version of the 3.7 L Ford Duratec 37 Cyclone, produces 350 hp (261 kW; 355 PS) at 6,750 rpm and 320 lb⋅ft (434 N⋅m) at 4,250 rpm. The V8 came in two engine configurations, a 2.7 L and a 3.0 L, both in-house designs based on the inline-four engine used in the Suzuki Hayabusa. The 2.7 L produces 430 hp (321 kW; 436 PS) at 9,500 rpm and 260 lb⋅ft (353 N⋅m) at 7,200 rpm, while the 3.0 L produces 480 hp (358 kW; 487 PS) at 9,100 rpm and 280 lb⋅ft (380 N⋅m) at 7,500 rpm. The RXC was based on the design of the previous Radical SR9 Le Mans prototype, and features a body made out of mostly carbon fibre composites. Both engines are mated to 7-speed semi-automatic transmission manufactured by Quaife, mounted transversely and driving the rear wheels. Standard features inside the RXC include air conditioning, power steering, heated windscreen and mirrors, and a multi-function adjustable steering wheel.

=== RXC Turbo / RXC GT (2014–present) ===
The RXC Turbo was unveiled at the 2014 Autosport International show, one year after the reveal of the original RXC. The RXC Turbo adds a new powerplant to the RXC lineup in the form of Ford's 3.5 L twin-turbocharged EcoBoost V6 engine, producing 448 hp (454 PS; 334 kW) at 5,500 rpm and 500 lb⋅ft (678 N⋅m) at 3,500 rpm. The RXC Turbo is also available with additional levels of sound deadening equipment in the interior to eliminate NVH at the cost of weight savings.

In 2017, the RXC Turbo was renamed the 'RXC GT'. It is now available with two optional tunes of the EcoBoost twin-turbo V6 engine, producing 400 hp (406 PS; 298 kW) in standard configuration, with the optional 650 hp (659 PS; 485 kW) tune shared by the contemporary RXC Spyder and RXC Turbo 600R.

=== RXC Spyder (2015–present) ===
In January 2015's Autosport International show, Radical revealed its new track-only model, the RXC Spyder. Intended to replace the Radical SR8 RX as the company's flagship track car, the RXC Spyder features an open cockpit and significant aerodynamic additions over previous RXC models. The RXC Spyder was initially offered with only the 3.0 L RPE RPX-V8 engine from the RXC V8, producing 440 hp (328 kW; 446 PS) at 9,100 rpm and 280 lb⋅ft (380 N⋅m) at 7,500 rpm. In 2016 after the release of the RXC Turbo 500R, the RXC Spyder became available with the 500R's 3.5 L twin-turbo EcoBoost engine, producing 600 hp (608 PS; 447 kW) at 6,700 rpm and 465 lb⋅ft (630 N⋅m) at 4,200 rpm–6,200 rpm. Similarly, after the release of the RXC Turbo 600R in 2017, the RXC Spyder became available with the 600R's further upgraded 3.5 L twin-turbo EcoBoost engine, producing 650 hp (659 PS; 485 kW).

=== RXC Turbo 500 (2015–2016) ===
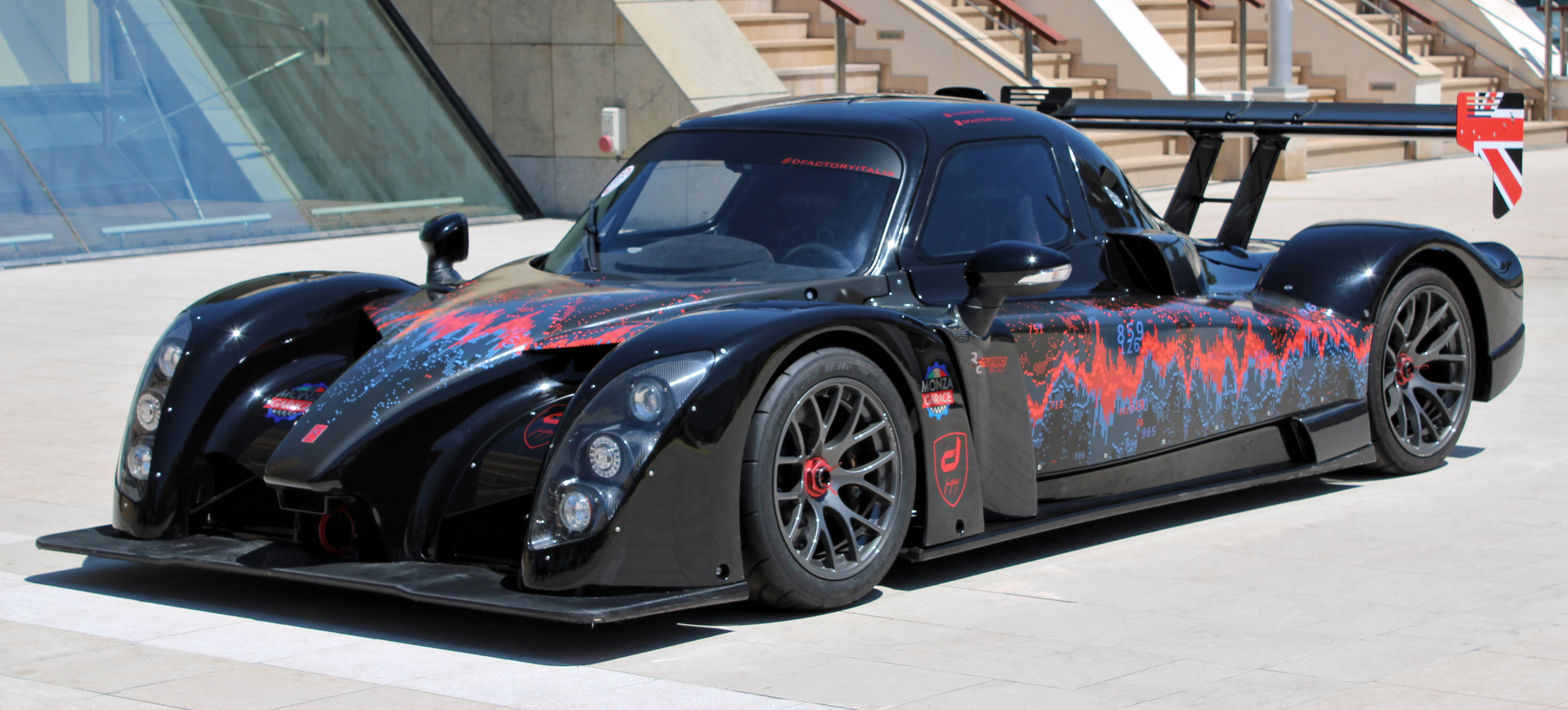
Radical RXC Turbo 500

At the 2015 Geneva Motor Show, Radical introduced a higher-performance version of the existing turbo road car, the RXC Turbo 500. All internals and externals of the car are carried over from the original Turbo, with the exception of the new uptuned 3.5 L EcoBoost engine. The RXC Turbo 500's EcoBoost V6 now produces 530 hp (537 PS; 395 kW) at 6,100 rpm and 481 lb⋅ft (652 N⋅m) at 5,000 rpm.

=== RXC Turbo 500R (2016–2017) ===
A further development of the RXC Turbo 500 would come at the next year's 2016 Geneva Motor Show in the form of the RXC Turbo 500R. The 500R features new weight-saving carbon fibre techniques that Radical claims cuts 50 kg from the original 500 model, as well as larger brakes paired to a new ABS system. The 3.5 L EcoBoost engine in 500R tune now produces 600 hp (608 PS; 447 kW) at 6,700 rpm and 465 lb⋅ft (630 N⋅m) at 4,200–6,200 rpm. The RXC 500R was produced on both track-only and road-legal Dunlop Tires.

=== RXC GT3 (2016–present) ===
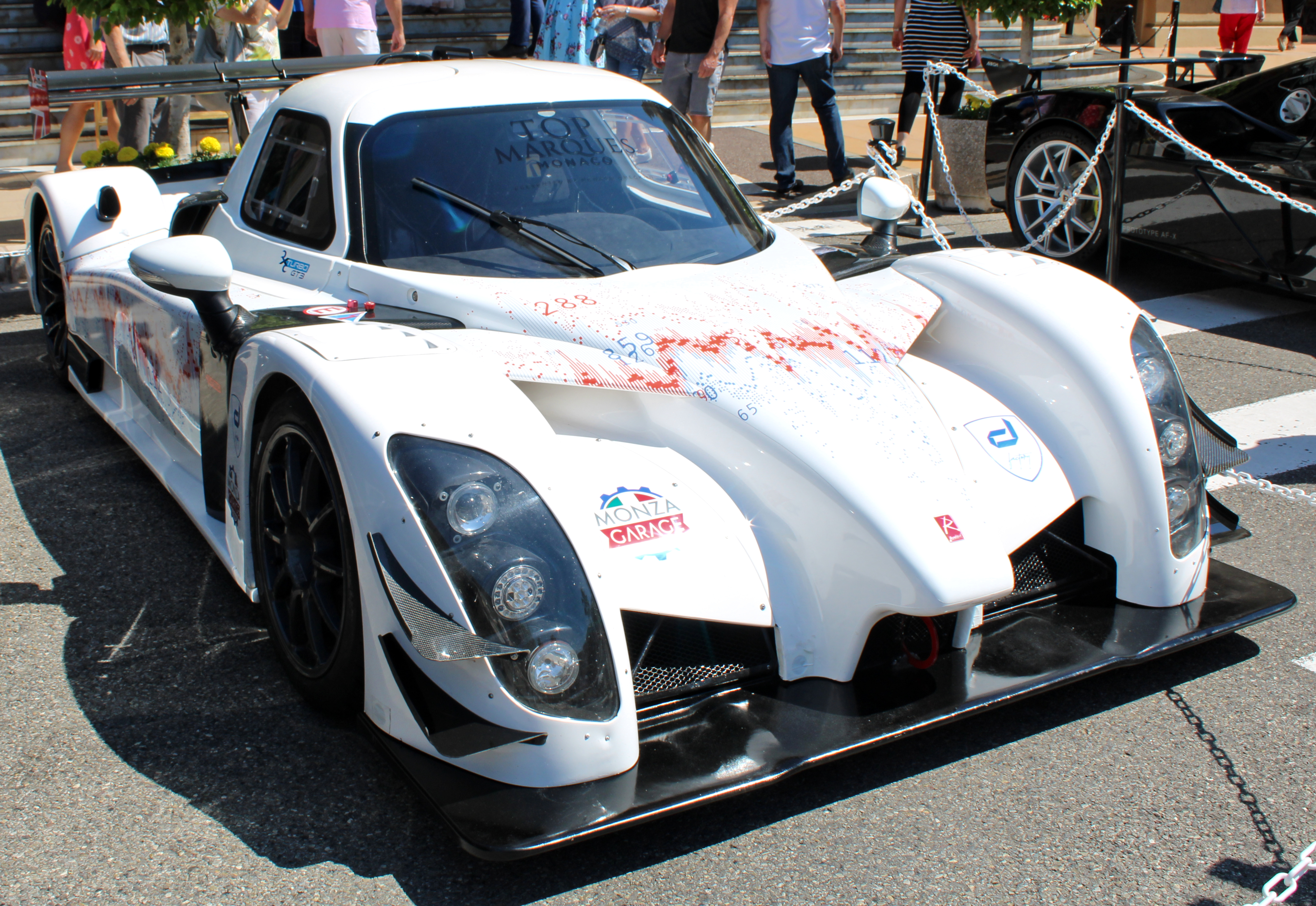
Radical RXC GT3

Also introduced in 2016 was the Radical RXC GT3, a modified version of the RXC Turbo homologated to FIA GT3 standards. Homologation was achieved with the RXC Turbo's 3.5 L EcoBoost engine, detuned to produce around 500 hp (507 PS; 373 kW) depending on individual championship rules, and a 6-speed semi-automatic transmission. Other differences from the RXC Turbo road car include a redesigned splitter, front canards, a modified rear wing and larger brake rotors and callipers.

=== RXC Turbo 600R (2017–present) ===
At the 2017 Goodwood Festival of Speed, Radical made a surprise appearance with the new RXC Turbo 600R model. The 600R is designed and sold as a track-only racecar, although Radical produced a one-off road-legal car that they premiered at the Goodwood Festival of Speed. The RXC Turbo 600R features the same 3.5 L EcoBoost engine from prior Turbo models, now tuned to produce 650 hp (659 PS; 485 kW), paired to a 6-speed semi-automatic transmission.

== Specifications ==
=== Powertrain ===
The Radical RXC's powertrain has consisted of four different engines over its many models, although current RXCs now use Ford's EcoBoost turbocharged V6 exclusively in many different tunes. The engines are mid-rear mounted and drive the rear wheels.

Engine	Model	Power	Torque	Years
3.7 L Ford Duratec 37 Cyclone V6	Radical RXC V6	350 hp (261 kW) @ 6750 rpm	320 lb⋅ft (434 N⋅m) @ 4250 rpm	2013–2016
2.7 L RPE-RPX V8	Radical RXC V8	430 hp (321 kW) @ 9500 rpm	260 lb⋅ft (353 N⋅m) @ 7200 rpm	2013–2016
3.0 L RPE-RPY V8	Radical RXC V8	480 hp (358 kW) @ 9100 rpm	280 lb⋅ft (380 N⋅m) @ 7500 rpm	2013–2016
3.0 L RPE-RPY V8	Radical RXC Spyder	440 hp (328 kW) @ 9100 rpm	280 lb⋅ft (380 N⋅m) @ 7500 rpm	2015–2017
3.5 L twin-turbocharged Ford EcoBoost V6	Radical RXC Turbo	448 hp (334 kW) @ 5500 rpm	500 lb⋅ft (678 N⋅m) @ 3500 rpm	2014–2017
3.5 L twin-turbocharged Ford EcoBoost V6	Radical RXC Turbo 500	530 hp (395 kW) @ 6100 rpm	481 lb⋅ft (652 N⋅m) @ 5000 rpm	2015–2016
3.5 L twin-turbocharged Ford EcoBoost V6	Radical RXC Turbo 500R	600 hp (447 kW) @ 6700 rpm	465 lb⋅ft (630 N⋅m) @ 4200-6200 rpm	2016–2017
3.5 L twin-turbocharged Ford EcoBoost V6	Radical RXC GT3	>500 hp (373 kW) @ –	–	2016–present
3.5 L twin-turbocharged Ford EcoBoost V6	Radical RXC Turbo 600R	650 hp (485 kW) @ –	–	2017–present
3.5 L twin-turbocharged Ford EcoBoost V6	Radical RXC Spyder	650 hp (485 kW) @ –	–	2017–present
3.5 L twin-turbocharged Ford EcoBoost V6	Radical RXC GT	400 hp (298 kW) @ –	–	2017–present
3.5 L twin-turbocharged Ford EcoBoost V6	Radical RXC GT	650 hp (485 kW) @ –	–	2017–present

=== Transmission ===
The RXC began production with a 7-speed semi-automatic transmission manufactured by Quaife, but as of 2017 the 7-speed has been phased out in favor of a 6-speed semi-automatic also manufactured by Quaife specifically for the RXC.

=== Suspension ===
The RXC uses double wishbone suspension on the front and rear axles, with interchangeable and adjustable anti-roll bars and Intrax dampers.

=== Chassis ===
The RXC's chassis is a carbon tubular steel space frame with fibreglass body panels. Many RXC models are available with an optional upgrade that incorporates more carbon-fibre body panels in place of fibreglass for additional weight savings.

=== Wheels ===
The RXC uses cast aluminum wheels of 17" diameter for the RXC GT and 18" for other current production models. Its disc brakes are sized at 350 mm (13.8 in) front and 310 mm (12.2 in) rear for the RXC GT, 360 mm (14.2 in) front and 330 mm (13.0 in) rear for the RXC Spyder and RXC Turbo 600R, and 390 mm (15.4 in) front and 360 mm (14.2 in) rear for the RXC GT3.

== Performance ==
Below is a table of manufacturer-claimed performance values for the currently available models of the Radical RXC.

Model	0-60 mph (seconds)	Top speed (mph)	Power (hp)	Power-to-weight ratio (bhp/tonne)	Lateral force (g)
RXC GT	2.7	180	650	575	2.1
RXC Spyder	2.7	180	650	644	2.1
RXC 600R	2.7	180	650	575	2.1
RXC GT3	2.7	180	>500	>430	2.1
