= RGE =

RGE may refer to

- Racing Green Endurance
- RGE Group
- Runaway greenhouse effect
- Rochester Gas and Electric
- Roubini Global Economics
- Royal Golden Eagle
- Rádio Gravações Especializadas
- Renormalization group equation
  - Beta function
  - Callan–Symanzik equation
  - Exact renormalization group equation
- Rogue (esports)
