= Radical Performance Engines =

Engine manufacturer

Radical Performance Engines (RPE)
- Company type: Private
- Industry: Automotive
- Headquarters: Peterborough, United Kingdom
- Products: Performance Enginess
- Number of employees: 20
- Parent: Radical Sportscars
- Website: radicalperformanceengines.com

Radical Performance Engines (RPE) are an engine manufacturer of performance engines from the United Kingdom. The company mainly works with Suzuki motorcycle based engines, and they are the sole engine manufacturer for Radical Sportscars.

== Engines ==
=== RPE GSX-R Series ===
Suzuki's acclaimed GSX-R series of engines are the basic building blocks of all RPE's racing engines, incorporating state-of-the-art technology with an unrivalled power-to-weight ratio.

The GSX-R 1300 Hayabusa was widely recognised as the world’s fastest production motorcycle, before the Kawasaki Ninja H2R came out, with a top speed of 194 mph (312 km/h.) Distinctive features of the Hayabusa engine are its abundance of low-end torque and strength of the components, making it the ideal powerplant for four-wheel applications.

=== RP-V8 Series ===
RPE RP-V8 (see Powertec RPA) is the name of a V8 engine series developed by RPE. The design is loosely based on the 1.3 litres (79.3 cu in) inline-four engine produced by Suzuki for their Hayabusa motorcycle. The company have designed their own cylinder block and use existing Suzuki cylinder heads. The two cylinder banks are inclined at a 72-degree angle. The engine is mated to a purpose-built transaxle designed by Quaife.

There are currently two versions of the engine available, which have been updated for 2011. First is the base 2.7 litres (164.8 cu in) model which retains the original bore and stroke of the K8 Hayabusa design and produces 430 horsepower (321 kW; 436 PS). Second is the bored and stroked 3.2 litres (195.3 cu in) model which produces up to 500 horsepower (373 kW; 507 PS). The older 2.8 engine powered the Radical SR8LM to the production vehicles lap record, see List of Nürburgring Nordschleife lap times

== Competition Use ==
=== Radical Sportscars ===
A large quantity of RPE's engines are produced and maintained for use by Radical Sportscars. These engines range from the original 1100cc engines used in Radical's clubsport, up to the very latest RPX 2.7 engine used in the SR8. The most popular engine is the RPE GSX-R series engine, a 1500cc engine used in Radical's very successful SR3 model. Radical are now developing a road going model, the SR3 SL, for which a Ford EcoBoost engine will be used.

=== Hillclimb & Autograss ===
RPE also provide engines for use in hillclimb and autograss competitions. Engines used here vary between the RPE GSX-R and the RP-V8 series. Success rates are high here, with many races and championships being contested and won by cars powered by RPE engines.

=== Super TC 2000 (2012-2018) ===
Starting in 2012 RPE provided their 2.7L V8 engine to the Argentine TC 2000 Series in a front wheel drive configuration. In 2019, this engine was replaced for a 2.0L straight-four engine turbocharged provided by Oreca.

=== Other uses ===
Some RPE engines have been used in more interesting examples, such as the Zapata jetski.
