= Radical SR4 =

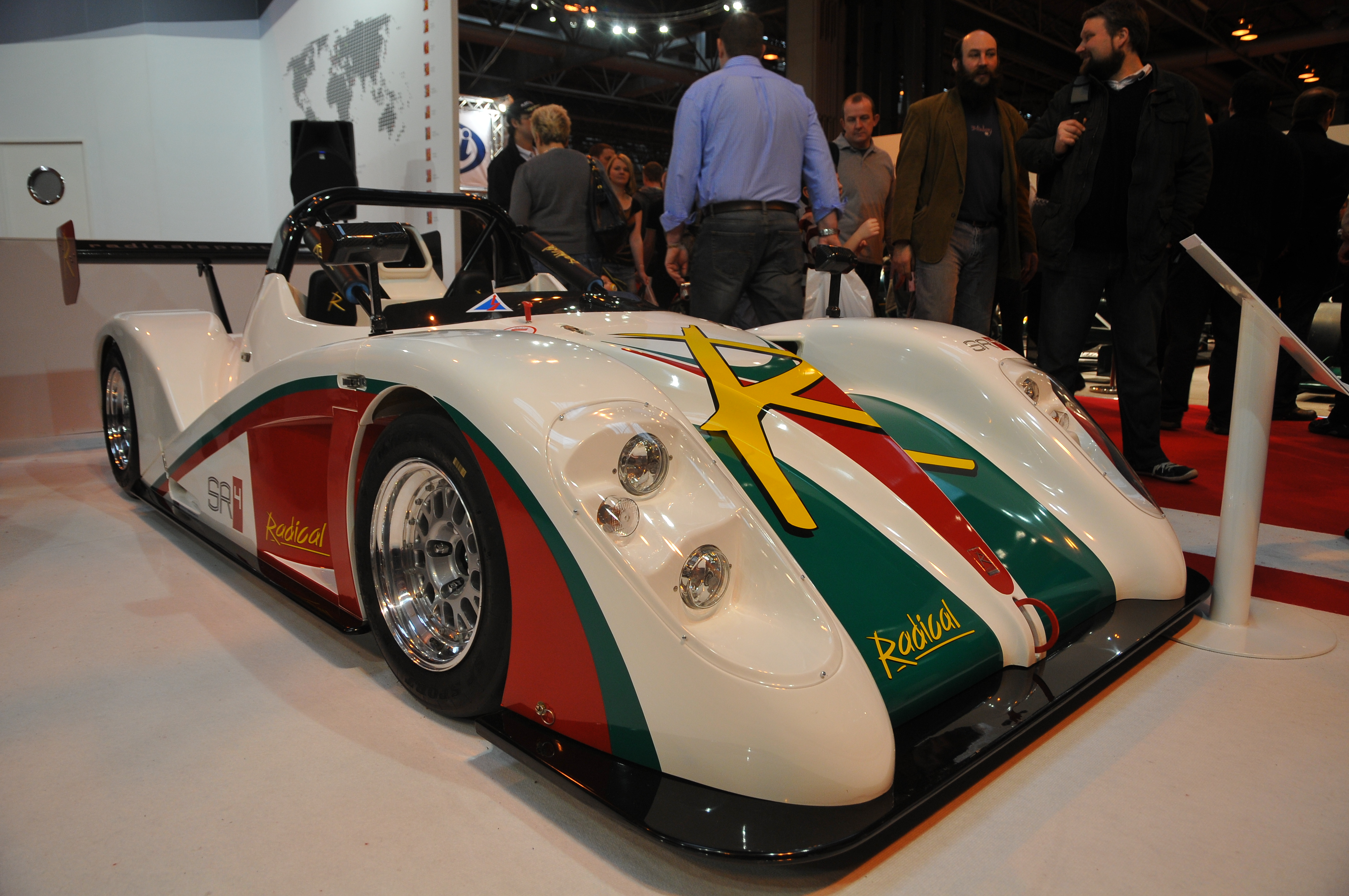

Overview
- Manufacturer: Radical Sportscars
- Production: 2004-2016; 46 produced
- Assembly: Peterborough, England
- Designer: Mike Pilbeam

Body and chassis
- Class: Sports Car
- Body style: Roadster
- Layout: Longitudinally mounted Mid Engine, RWD
- Related: Radical SR3

Powertrain
- Engine: See below
- Transmission: 6-speed Sequential and Manual

Dimensions
- Wheelbase: 2,370 millimetres (93 in)
- Length: 3,760 millimetres (148 in)
- Width: 1,630 millimetres (64 in)
- Height: 1,000 millimetres (39 in)

Chronology
- Predecessor: Radical Clubsport

The Radical SR4 is the sixth car produced by Radical.

== History ==
The SR4 was originally intended as a smaller sibling to the SR3, however the car was significantly less popular then that of the SR3, with only 46 of the SR4 being made until the production was halted in 2016.

== Specifications ==
The SR4 would have largely similar motors to its larger siblings, with one notable exception; the 998 cc (60.9 cu in; 0.998 L) Honda CBR1000RR motor, which was one of the unique options to the SR4, with only 7 being produced with this engine, and only 2 retaining this engine as of December 2024. The other unique engine option was that of the 1,164 cc (71.0 cu in; 1.164 L) Kawasaki ZZ-R1200, which was the first engine fitted to the car, but no car built with this engine is still fitted with it as of December of 2024. The 1200 will do 0-100 km/h (62 mph) in 3.7s, the quarter mile in 12.4s and has a top speed of 234 km/h (145 mph).

== Engines ==
Name	Displacement	Engine	Horsepower	Torque	Weight
SR4 1000	998 cc (60.9 cu in; 0.998 L)	I4 (Honda CBR1000RR)	172 bhp (174 PS; 128 kW) @ 11,000 rpm	104 N⋅m (77 lb⋅ft) @ 8,500	530 kg (1,170 lb)
SR4 1200	1,164 cc (71.0 cu in; 1.164 L)	I4 (Kawasaki ZZ-R1200)	186 bhp (189 PS; 139 kW) @ 9,800 rpm	125 N⋅m (92 lb⋅ft) @ 6,500	530 kg (1,170 lb)
SR4 1300 SR4 CS	1,300 cc (79 cu in; 1.3 L)	I4 (Powertech-Suzuki Turbocharged)	250 PS (250 bhp; 180 kW)	175 N⋅m (129 lb⋅ft)	500 kg (1,100 lb)
SR4 1340	1,340 cc (82 cu in; 1.34 L)	I4 (Suzuki Hayabusa)	202 bhp (205 PS; 151 kW)	169 N⋅m (125 lb⋅ft)	430 kg (950 lb)
SR4 1500	1,489 cc (90.9 cu in; 1.489 L)	I4 (Powertech-Suzuki)	252 bhp (255 PS; 188 kW)	176 N⋅m (130 lb⋅ft)	445 kg (981 lb)
SR4 1585	1,567 cc (95.6 cu in; 1.567 L)	I4 (Powertech-Suzuki)	333 bhp (338 PS; 248 kW)	300 N⋅m (220 lb⋅ft)	500 kg (1,100 lb)
