= Suzuki GSX-R/4 =

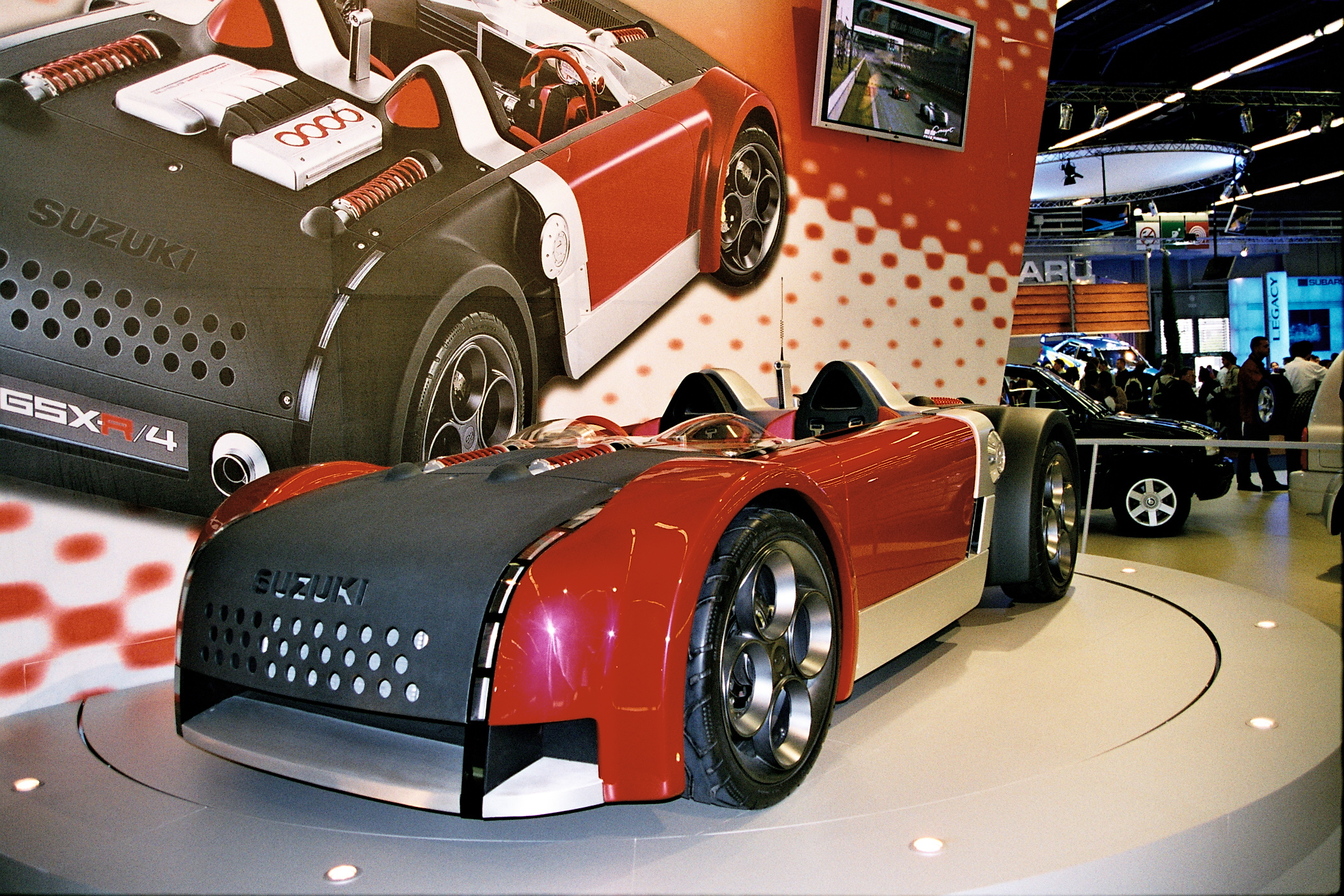

Overview
- Manufacturer: Suzuki
- Production: 2001

Body and chassis
- Class: Concept car
- Body style: Roadster
- Layout: Mid-engine design
- Related: Suzuki Hayabusa; Suzuki Formula Hayabusa

Powertrain
- Engine: 1.3 L (79 in^{3}), 4-stroke inline-four, liquid-cooled, DOHC, 16-valve, 173 bhp (129 kW)
- Transmission: 6-speed sequential manual

Dimensions
- Length: 3,550 mm (140 in)
- Width: 1,730 mm (68 in)
- Height: 1,010 mm (40 in)
- Curb weight: 640 kg (1,410 lb)

Chronology
- Successor: Suzuki Vision Gran Turismo

The Suzuki GSX-R/4 is a concept car made by Suzuki in 2001. Designed as a showcase for technology, it was never meant for production.

It has a mid-mounted, 1.3 L (79 in^{3}) DOHC engine taken from the company's flagship motorcycle, the GSX-1300R Hayabusa with a top speed reaching of 181 mph (291 km/h) at 9800 rpm. It had upscale features for its time, such as GPS navigation. Alongside the GSX-R/4, Suzuki presented the Formula Hayabusa, an open wheel race car concept, also using the 173 bhp (129 kW) motorcycle engine.

== Appearances ==
The GSX-R/4 appears as a playable vehicle in the Gran Turismo series. A 1/64 scale die-cast model was released by Hot Wheels.

The Hayabusa drivetrain was later implemented again on the Suzuki Vision Gran Turismo, making it as a successor to the GSX-R/4.
