= Suzuki Hayabusa =

Sports motorcycle

Suzuki GSX1300R Hayabusa
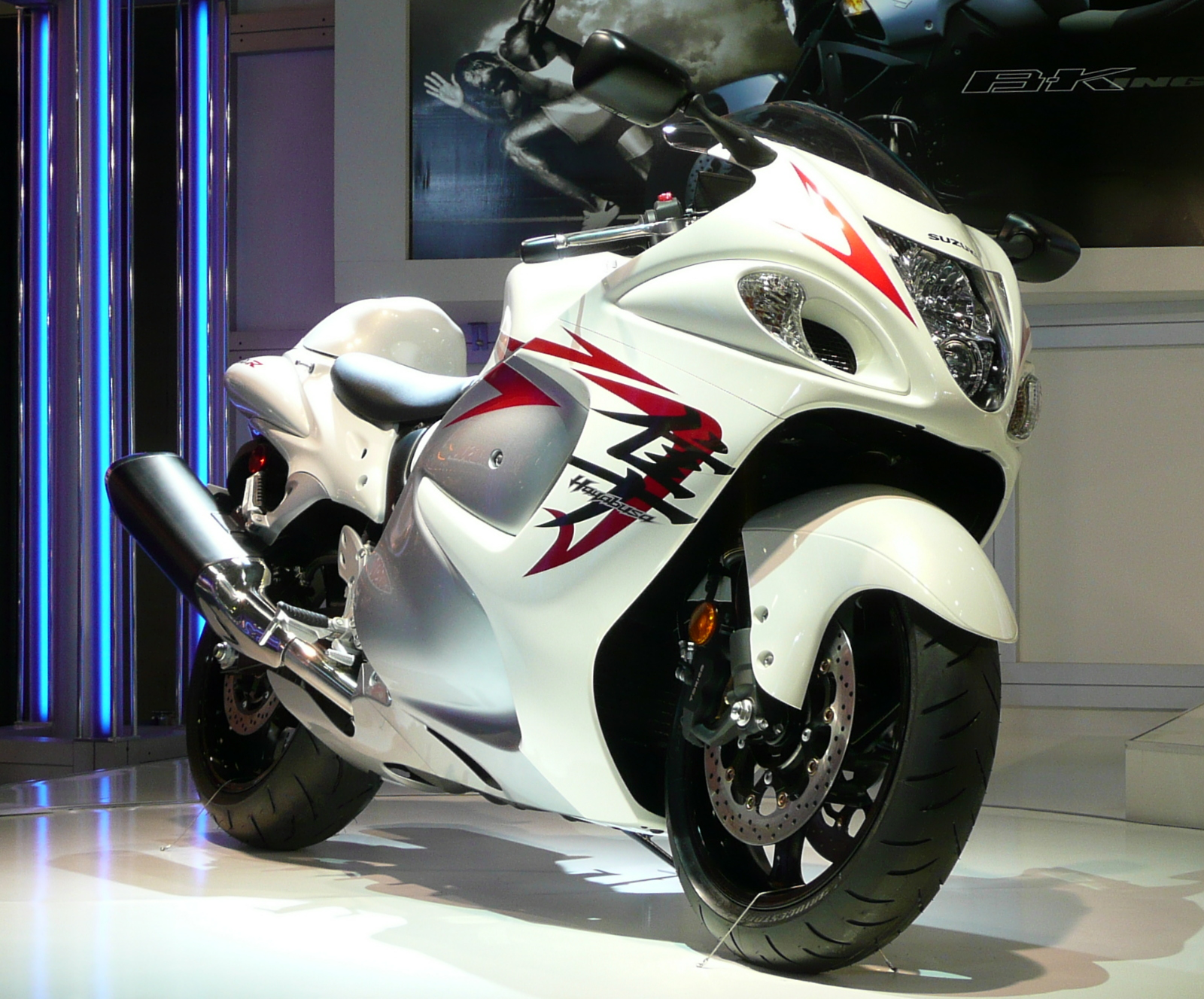
- 2007 Hayabusa
- Manufacturer: Suzuki
- Also called: Hayabusa
- Production: 1999–present
- Assembly: Japan: Toyokawa, Aichi (Toyokawa plant); India: Gurgaon (Gurgaon plant)
- Class: Sport bike
- Top speed: 1999-2000: 303–312 km/h (188–194 mph); 2001: 299 km/h (186 mph)
- Related: Suzuki B-King

The Suzuki GSX1300R Hayabusa is a sports motorcycle made by Suzuki since 1999. It immediately won acclaim as the world's fastest production motorcycle, with a top speed of 303 to 312 km/h (188 to 194 mph).

In 1999, fears of a European regulatory backlash or import ban led to an informal agreement between the Japanese and European manufacturers to govern the top speed of their motorcycles at an arbitrary limit starting in late 2000. The media-reported value for the speed agreement in miles per hour was consistently 186 mph, while in kilometers per hour it varied from 299 to 303 km/h, which is typical given unit conversion rounding errors. This figure may also be affected by a number of external factors, as can the power and torque values.

The conditions under which this limitation was adopted led to the 1999 and 2000 Hayabusa's title remaining, at least technically, immune, since no subsequent model could go faster without being tampered with like early 2000 models. After the much anticipated Kawasaki Ninja ZX-12R of 2000 fell 6 km/h (4 mph) short of claiming the title, the Hayabusa secured its place as the fastest standard production bike of the 20th century. This gives the unrestricted 1999 models even more cachet with collectors.

Besides its speed, the Hayabusa has been lauded by many reviewers for its all-round performance, in that it does not drastically compromise other qualities like handling, comfort, reliability, noise, fuel economy or price in pursuit of a single function. Jay Koblenz of Motorcycle Consumer News commented, "If you think the ability of a motorcycle to approach 190 mph or reach the quarter-mile in under 10 seconds is at best frivolous and at worst offensive, this still remains a motorcycle worthy of just consideration. The Hayabusa is Speed in all its glory. But Speed is not all the Hayabusa is."

== Etymology ==
Hayabusa (隼) is Japanese for "peregrine falcon", a bird that often serves as a metaphor for speed due to its vertical hunting dive, or stoop, speed of 290 to 325 km/h (180 to 202 mph), the fastest of any bird. In particular, the choice of name was made because the peregrine falcon preys on blackbirds, which reflected the intent of the original Hayabusa to unseat the Honda CBR1100XX Super Blackbird as the world's fastest production motorcycle. Eventually, the Hayabusa managed to surpass the Super Blackbird by at least a full 16 km/h (10 mph).

== First generation (1999–2007) ==
1999–2007
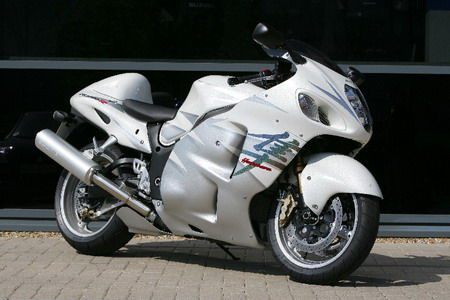
- 2007 Hayabusa Limited Edition
- Also called: GSX-1300R-X (1999), GSX-1300R-Y (2000), GSX-1300R-K1–K7 (2001–2007)
- Engine: 1,299 cc (79.3 cu in), 4-stroke inline-four, liquid-cooled, DOHC, 16-valve, Keihin/Denso fuel Injection, wet sump
- Bore / stroke: 81.0 mm × 63.0 mm (3.19 in × 2.48 in)
- Compression ratio: 11:1
- Top speed: 1999-2000 303–312 km/h (188–194 mph); 2001–2007 299 km/h (186 mph) See performance and measurements
- Power: 129 kW (173 hp) (claimed); 113.0–121.3 kW (151.5–162.6 hp) (rear wheel) @ 9,500–9,750 rpm, See performance and measurements
- Torque: 126.6–135.0 N⋅m (93.4–99.6 lb⋅ft) (rear wheel)@ 6,750–7,000 rpm, See performance and measurements
- Transmission: 6-speed constant-mesh sequential manual, #532 chain drive
- Suspension: Front Inverted telescopic fork, fully adjustable spring preload, 14-way adjustable rebound damping and 13-way adjustable compression damping Rear Link-type, gas/oil damped, fully adjustable spring preload, 22-way adjustable compression & rebound damping
- Brakes: Front 6-pot Tokico calipers on 320 mm stainless steel discs Rear Single hydraulic disc
- Tires: Bridgestone Battlax BT56 Front 120/70-ZR-17, Rear 190/50-ZR-17
- Rake, trail: 24.2°, 97 mm (3.8 in)
- Wheelbase: 1,485 mm (58.5 in)
- Dimensions: L: 2,140 mm (84 in); W: 740 mm (29 in); H: 1,155 mm (45.5 in)
- Seat height: 805 mm (31.7 in)
- Weight: See performance and measurements 215–242 kg (474–534 lb) (dry); 250–255.3 kg (551–563 lb) (wet)
- Fuel capacity: 21 L (4.6 imp gal; 5.5 US gal) (California 19 L (4.2 imp gal; 5.0 US gal))
- Fuel consumption: 1999 6.4 L/100 km; 44 mpg_{‑imp} (37 mpg_{‑US}), 6.11 L/100 km; 46.2 mpg_{‑imp} (38.5 mpg_{‑US}); 2005 7.4 L/100 km; 38 mpg_{‑imp} (32 mpg_{‑US})
- Turning radius: 2.25m

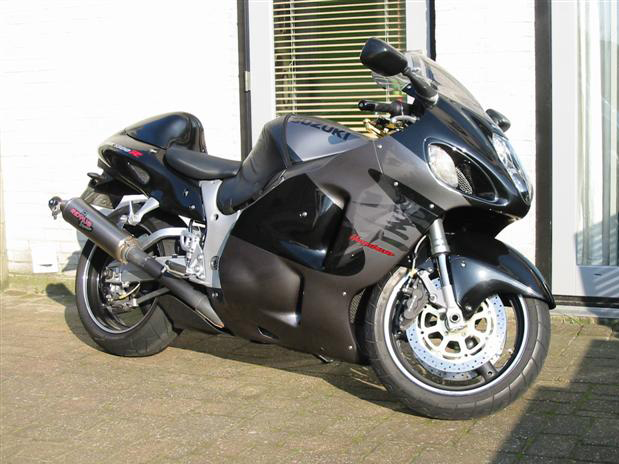
1999 Suzuki Hayabusa

When first shown to the press in 1999, the first Hayabusas made a profound impression. No previous motorcycle has broken the production model top speed record by such a margin, 16 to 23 km/h (10 to 14 mph), depending on which measured speeds the source was relying on for the CBR1100XX and the GSX-1300R.

The first generation had a 1,299 cc (79.3 cu in) liquid-cooled, inline-4 engine with sixteen valves driven by dual-overhead camshafts. This configuration, technologically unremarkable for that time, delivered a record-setting claimed 129 kW (173 bhp) at the crankshaft by virtue of the largest displacement ever in a sport bike, and a ram air system that forced cool, pressurized air into the cylinders at speed. Combined with sophisticated aerodynamics, this powerful engine pushed the Hayabusa's top speed above the Honda CBR1100XX Blackbird by a significant leap, contrasting with the incremental gains that preceded the Suzuki hyper sport entry. The 1997 carbureted CBR1100XX had previously only inched past the previous top speed record holder, the Kawasaki Ninja ZX-11 of 1990.

The Hayabusa's abundance of power at any engine speed made the Hayabusa easier to ride by giving the rider a greater choice of gear selection for a given speed and stunning acceleration.

The ram air ducts at the front of the drooping, rounded nose squeezed the frontal area away from the headlight, and this, along with the need for a narrow frontal area, necessitated a stacked headlight and high beam behind a single lens. Moreover, the need to reduce the extreme drag encountered at high speeds determined the Hayabusa's entire bulbous, and much-criticized, bodywork design. Koblenz remarked, "non-traditional styling generates the main controversy of the Hayabusa." When viewed through the eyes of those who judged its beauty on the basis of its functionality, or given a little time to get used to it, the bike's looks did find admirers. The striking two-tone brown/silver paint scheme was similarly loved by some and hated by others but was successful if the intent of an all-new, flagship product is to make a bold statement. So while it was called ugly by some in the press, this aerodynamic shape was key to the Hayabusa's ability to reach record-setting speeds.

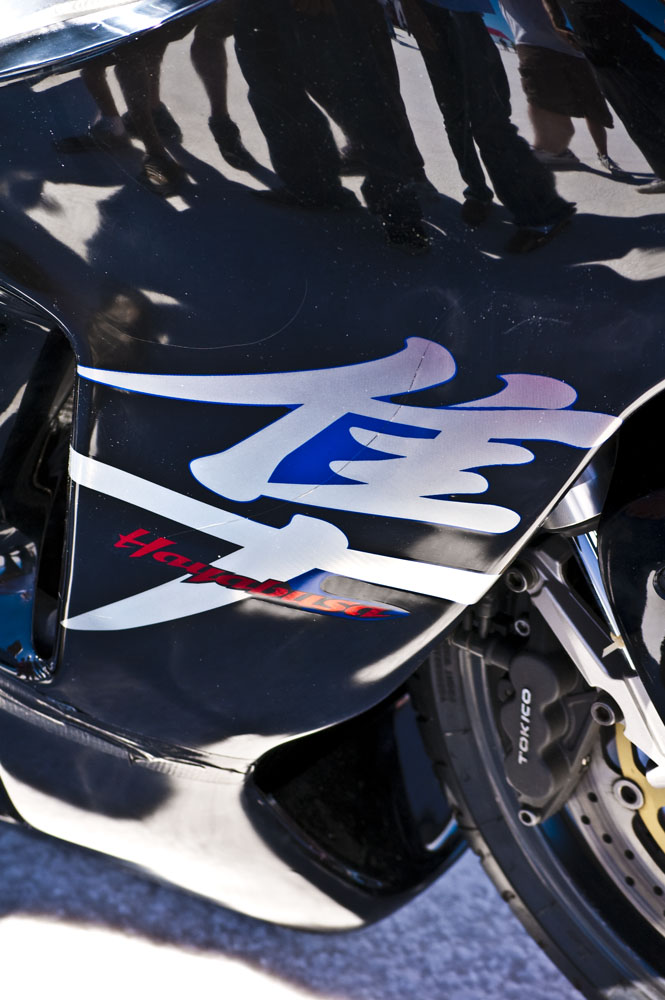
Fairing decal of the Japanese character 隼, peregrine falcon

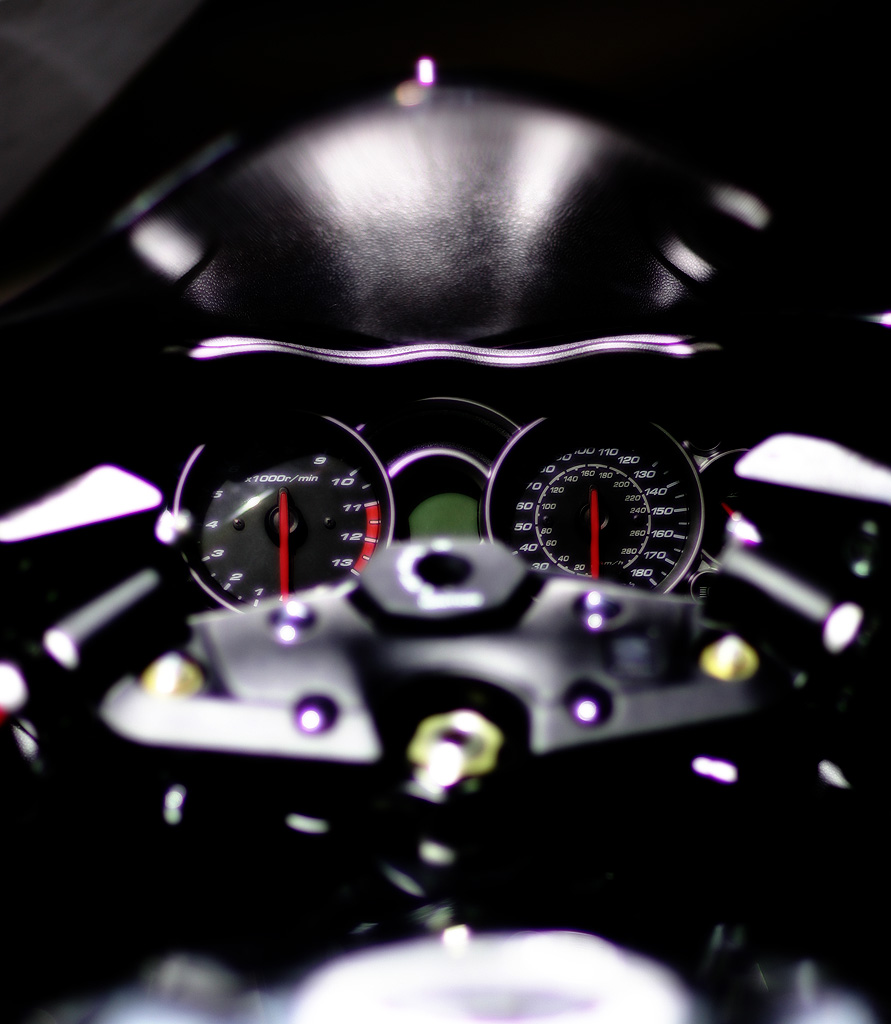
Hayabusa cockpit

Reflecting in 2009 on the initial design, the creator of the Hayabusa's look, Suzuki's Koji Yoshiura, said that the intent in 1999 was, "to create a somewhat grotesque design and create a strong initial impact... The mission was to create a total new styling that will not be out of date within few years, and a styling that will be the 'Face' of Suzuki." Yoshirua also said that the goal was not to achieve the status of the fastest production motorcycle, which in early stages was slated to be only 900 to 1,100 cc (55 to 67 cu in), but that, "as a consequence of, pursuing the best handling, acceleration, safety, power, riding ability, original styling, etc., for the good of the customers, it became the 'Fastest production motorcycle' … By doing this, once the model was out in the market and the performance of it have been proven, I thought that people will start to show interest to the weird design, and then the design would be caked in peoples mind."

The engine used a gear-driven counterbalancer to reduce vibration to the point that the engine could be solidly mounted to the frame, for the purpose of increasing chassis rigidity. Employing a conventional twin beam frame, fully adjustable upside down forks, using specially developed Bridgestone tires, and being relatively light at 215 kg (473 lb) dry, the Hayabusa's handling was considered excellent for a machine of this class. One reviewer, Koblenz, noted a hesitation perhaps related to poor low-rpm mapping at low speeds, noticeable as a "pause and slight lurch" when rolling on and back off the throttle.

=== Top speed limited by agreement ===
With rumors and then pre-release announcements of much greater power in Kawasaki's Ninja ZX-12R in 2000, clearly attempting to unseat Suzuki and regain lucrative bragging rights, the speed war appeared to be escalating. There were growing fears of carnage and mayhem from motorcycles getting outrageously faster every year, and there was talk of regulating hyper sport motorcycles, or banning their import to Europe.

The response was a so-called gentlemen's agreement between the Japanese and European manufacturers to electronically limit the speed of their motorcycles to 300 km/h (186 mph). The informal agreement went fully into effect for the 2001 model year. So for 2001 models, and those since, the question of which bike was fastest could only be answered by tampering with the speed limiting system, meaning that it was no longer a contest between stock, production motorcycles, absolving the manufacturer of blame and letting those not quite as fast avoid losing face. Both Kawasaki and Suzuki would claim, at least technically, to have the world's fastest production motorcycle.

=== Other developments ===
After the inclusion of the speed limiting system in 2001, the Hayabusa remained substantially the same through the 2007 model year. An exception was a response to the problem of the aluminum rear subframe on 1999 and 2000 models breaking when the bike may have been overloaded with a passenger and luggage, and/or stressed by an aftermarket exhaust modification, so 2001 and later Hayabusas had a steel instead of aluminum rear subframe, adding 10 lb (4.5 kg) to the 1999 and 2000 models' approximately 250 kg (550 lb) wet weight.

=== Performance and measurements ===
Power	Torque	Weight	Tested by
155.9 hp (116.3 kW) @ 9,700 rpm	129.5 N⋅m (95.5 lb⋅ft) @ 8,000 rpm	1999–2000: 249.48 kg (550.0 lb); 2001–2007: 254.01–255.3 kg (560.0–562.8 lb) (wet)	Motorcyclist
151.1 hp (112.7 kW) @ 9,500 rpm	126.6 N⋅m (93.4 lb⋅ft) @ 7,000 rpm	250 kg (550 lb) (wet)	Motorcycle Consumer News '99
156.6 hp (116.8 kW) @ 9,500 rpm	135.0 N⋅m (99.6 lb⋅ft) @ 6,750 rpm	234 kg (515 lb) (dry); 250 kg (550 lb) (wet)	Sport Rider '99
158.6 hp (118.3 kW) @ 9,750 rpm	132.1 N⋅m (97.4 lb⋅ft) @ 7,000 rpm	238 kg (525 lb) (dry); 250 kg (560 lb) (wet)	Sport Rider '01
162.6 hp (121.3 kW) @ 9,750 rpm	133.4 N⋅m (98.4 lb⋅ft) @ 7,000 rpm	242 kg (533 lb) (dry); 255 kg (563 lb) (wet)	Sport Rider '05

1999–2007 model year performance
¼ mile (402 m)	0 to 60 mph (0 to 97 km/h)	0 to 100 mph (0 to 160 km/h)	Top Speed	Tested by
10.4 seconds			310 km/h (190 mph)	Motorcycle News
9.86 seconds @ 235 km/h (146 mph)			312 km/h (194 mph)	Cycle World
9.97 seconds @ 233.0 km/h (144.8 mph)			305.1 km/h (189.6 mph)	Sport Rider 8/99, 12/99
9.84 seconds @ 229.75 km/h (142.76 mph)	2.76 seconds	5.30 seconds	303 km/h (188 mph)	Motorcycle Consumer News 6/99
			186 mph (299 km/h)	Cycle World
10.277 seconds @ 221.9 km/h (137.9 mph)				Motorcyclist
9.89 seconds @ 231.02 km/h (143.55 mph)	2.47 seconds		296 km/h (184 mph)	Cycle World 06/02
10.237 seconds @ 226.18 km/h (140.54 mph)			296.0 km/h (183.9 mph)	Sport Rider 10/02
10.02 seconds @ 230.9 km/h (143.5 mph)				Sport Rider 10/05

== Second generation (2008–2020) ==
2008–2020
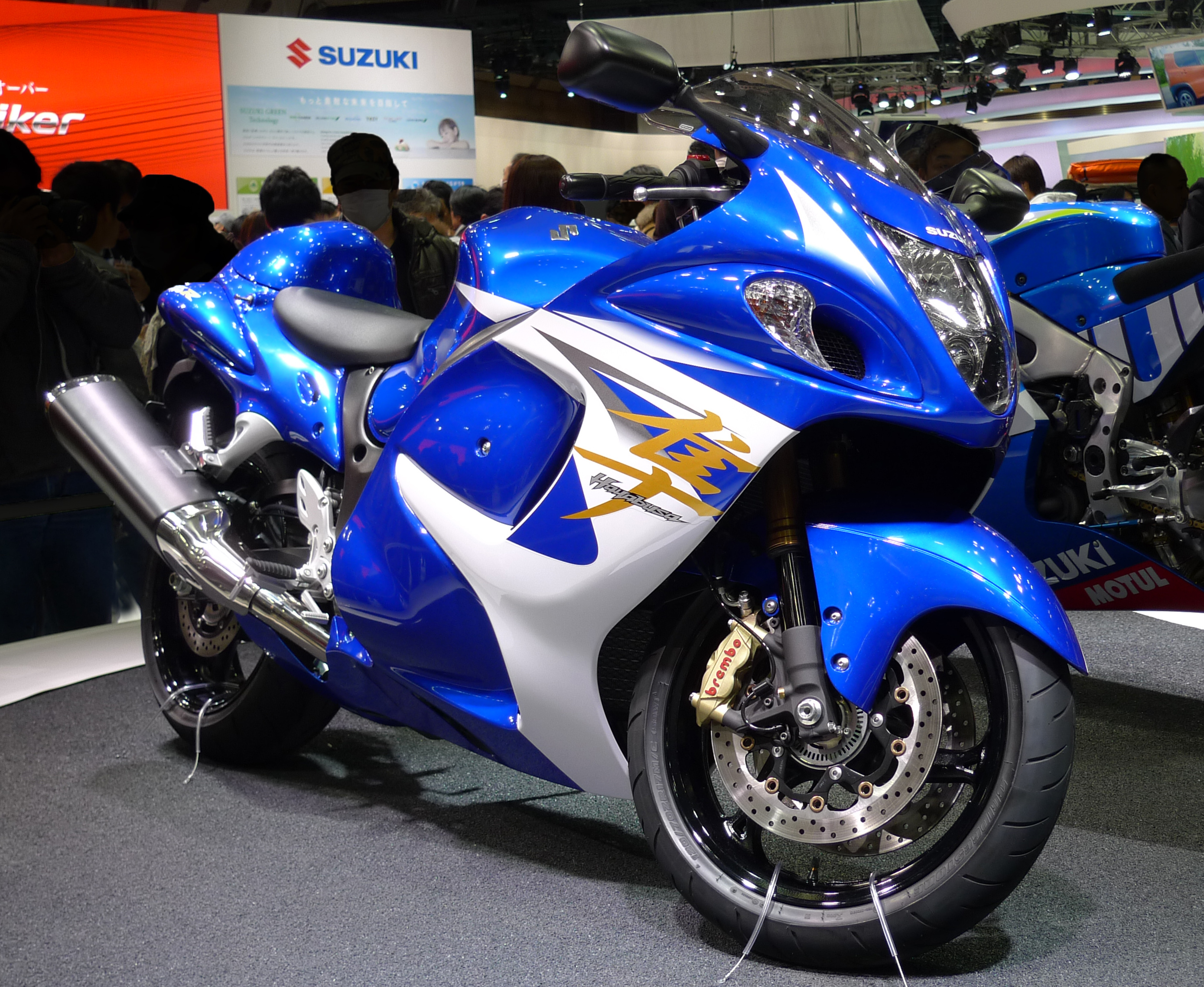
- Also called: GSX-1300R-K8 (2008), -K9 (2009)
- Engine: 1,340 cc (82 cu in), 4-stroke inline-four, liquid-cooled, DOHC, 16-valve, Keihin/Denso fuel Injection, wet sump
- Bore / stroke: 81.0 mm × 65.0 mm (3.19 in × 2.56 in)
- Compression ratio: 12.5:1
- Top speed: 299 km/h
- Power: 147 kW (197 hp)(claimed); 172.2 hp (128.4 kW) (rear wheel)@ 10100 rpm
- Torque: 138.7 N⋅m (102.3 lb⋅ft),(claimed); 132.6 N⋅m (97.8 lb⋅ft) @ 7600 rpm(rear wheel)
- Transmission: 6-speed constant-mesh sequential manual, slipper clutch, #530 chain drive
- Suspension: Front Inverted telescopic, coil spring, fully adjustable spring preload, adjustable rebound damping and adjustable compression damping Rear Link-type, gas/oil damped, fully adjustable spring preload, adjustable compression & rebound damping
- Brakes: Front 4-pot Tokico radial mount calipers on 310 mm x 5.5 mm disc Rear Single hydraulic disc
- Tires: Bridgestone Battlax BT015 Front 120/70-ZR-17, Rear 190/50-ZR-17
- Wheelbase: 1,485 mm (58.5 in)
- Dimensions: L: 2,195 mm (86.4 in); W: 740 mm (29 in); H: 1,170 mm (46 in)
- Seat height: 805 mm (31.7 in)
- Weight: See performance and measurements 250 kg (550 lb) (dry); 264.0–268.5 kg (582–592 lb) (wet)
- Fuel capacity: 21 L (4.6 imp gal; 5.5 US gal) (California 20 L (4.4 imp gal; 5.3 US gal))
- Fuel consumption: 7.1 L/100 km; 40 mpg_{‑imp} (33 mpg_{‑US})

Suzuki lightly revised the GSX1300R for the 2008 model year, with a minor restyling of the bodywork, and fine-tuning of the engine's head, pistons and exhaust. Though the engine changes were relatively limited, they still yielded a large horsepower increase, and brought the bike into compliance with new noise and emissions requirements.

=== Planning ===
In 2004, market researchers from the US and Japan began working to identify which elements of the Hayabusa design had attracted so many buyers, discovering that, in spite of having its looks sometimes disparaged in print, customers were much enamored with the old Hayabusa. A redesign meant to strengthen the bike's appearance without departing much from the original found approval with dealers and focus groups. Underneath the skin, Suzuki decided to save considerable development cost by keeping major portions of the frame and engine unchanged. This was because engineers had determined greater power was possible without a significant redesign of the old engine, even faced with the need to comply with more stringent noise and air pollution rules. The target was to produce more than 190 bhp (142 kW) at the crankshaft, and they delivered 194 hp (145 kW), an 11 or 12 percent increase over the previous output. When the new Hayabusa was released, independent tests bore this out, with 172.2 bhp (128.4 kW) @ 10,100 rpm measured at the rear wheel.

Suzuki's Koji Yoshiura designed the look of the new Hayabusa. He had previously styled the first generation Hayabusa, as well as the Suzuki Bandit 400, RF600R, TL1000S and the SV650. For research, Yoshiura traveled around the United States to bike nights and clubs for a first-hand look at the styling aesthetic of the Hayabusa custom scene and was inspired as much by the look and build of the Hayabusa rider as their custom bikes. While the second generation is very close to the first in overall shape and is largely dictated by wind tunnel tests, the raised lines and curves are meant to suggest a muscular build. Said Yoshiura, "I wanted to create a masculine form that complements a rider's muscular structure with hints of developed bicep, forearm, and calves."

=== Technical revisions ===
Engine changes consisted of an increase in stroke by 2 mm, enlarging displacement to 1,340 cc (82 cu in). The compression ratio was boosted from 11:1 to 12.5:1 and the cylinder head was made more compact and was given lighter titanium valves, saving 14.1 g (0.50 oz) and 11.7 g (0.41 oz) on each intake and exhaust valve, respectively. The valves were driven by a chain with a new hydraulic tensioner. The pistons were made lighter by 1.4 g (0.049 oz) and used ion-coated rings and shot peened connecting rods. The crankcase breather system had reed valves added to control pressure waves in the intake airbox, a way of avoiding power loss.

Fuel injectors from the GSX-R1000 were used, with smaller 44 mm (2 in) throttle bodies, called the Suzuki Dual Throttle Valve (SDTV) system. It has three selectable options of power delivery for a range of touring to wide open high performance. The exhaust system was overhauled, using a 4-2-1-2 system, meaning four exhaust outlets merging into two pipes, and then joining into a single pipe before splitting into two enlarged, quieter mufflers, which added a few pounds of weight compared to the first generation Hayabusa. The exhaust also included a catalytic converter and an oxygen sensor in order to meet Euro 3 emissions requirements.

The suspension was upgraded with a 43 mm Kayaba inverted fork with sliders having a diamond-like carbon (DLC) coating. The rear shock is also a Kayaba, and the overall suspension is firmer than the previous model. The swingarm is similar in design to the old one but was strengthened. The front and rear remain fully adjustable. The transmission was given a heavier-duty, slipper clutch. The final drive ratio was slightly lower, and gears 5-6 were spaced farther apart, and gear ratios 1-2 moved closer together.

Ergonomic and cosmetic changes for the 2008 model include a higher windscreen, and interlocking gauge faces with a digital speedometer, as well as a new gear indicator and adjustable shift light. The fairing fasteners were hidden to uncomplicate custom paint work. The twin-spar aluminum frame was carried over from the previous version, and wheelbase, rake/trail, and seat height were the same, while overall length grew by two inches, and the taller windscreen added about ½ inch. Weight was saved by omitting the centerstand.

Technical improvements in the chassis include Tokico radial brake calipers, allowing smaller discs and therefore lower unsprung weight, translating into superior handling. Increased front braking power necessitated a sturdier lower triple clamp. The rear brake caliper was moved to the top of the disc, giving a cleaner visual appearance. New 17 inch wheels were designed, using Bridgestone BT-015 radials taken almost directly from the GSX-R1000.

Other changes were a steering damper with a reservoir and dual cooling fans with a larger, curved radiator. Because of increased vibration from the longer stroke, the fuel tank was put on floating mounts. All told, the changes for 2008 resulted in a dry weight of 490 lb (222 kg), 5 lb (2 kg) heavier than the prior generation.

=== Other developments ===
Suzuki has dropped the GSX1300R designation in some countries and simply called the motorcycle the Hayabusa.

In October 2009, the company celebrated the tenth anniversary of the Hayabusa in Santa Pod raceway where more than 500 owners of Hayabusas converged. Many events were organized and prizes were distributed to people who visited the event.

There were no changes through the 2011 model year except for new colors.

Alongside the second generation Hayabusa, Suzuki developed the new B-King, a naked bike in the streetfighter mold, using the same engine but with a different intake and exhaust.

=== Performance and measurements ===
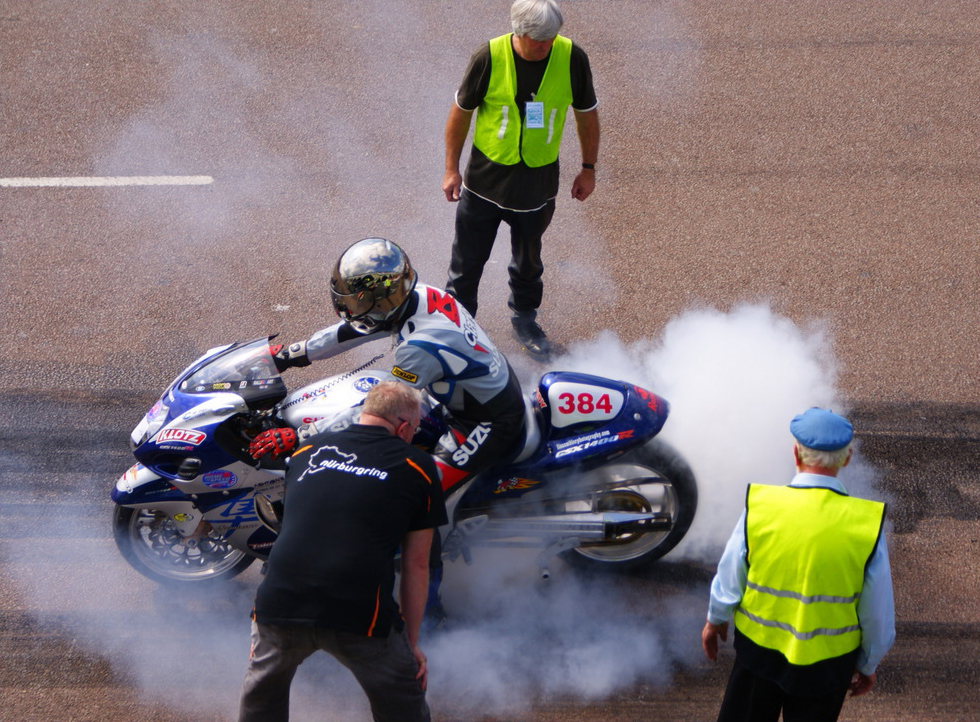
Burnout at the Brighton Speed Trials, 2008

Horsepower	Torque	Weight	Tested by
172.2 hp (128.4 kW) @ 9,500 rpm	97.6 lb⋅ft (132.3 N⋅m) @ 8,500 rpm	268.5 kg (592 lb) (wet)	Motorcyclist
164.8 hp (122.9 kW) @ 10,100 rpm	97.8 lb⋅ft (132.6 N⋅m) @ 7,600 rpm	250 kg (550 lb) (dry); 264 kg (583 lb) (wet)	Sport Rider

2008– model year performance
¼ mile (402 m)	0 to 60 mph (0 to 97 km/h)	0 to 100 mph (0 to 160 km/h)	Top Speed	Tested by
10.2 seconds			186 mph (299 km/h)	Motorcycle News
9.7 seconds @ 148.8 mph (239.5 km/h)			186 mph (299 km/h)	Cycle World Feb. '08
10.14 seconds @ 142.54 mph (229.40 km/h)			186 mph (299 km/h)	Motorcyclist Dec. '07
9.75 seconds @ 147.2 mph (236.9 km/h)	2.6 seconds		186 mph (299 km/h)	Cycle World Mar. '08

== Third generation (2022) ==
2022
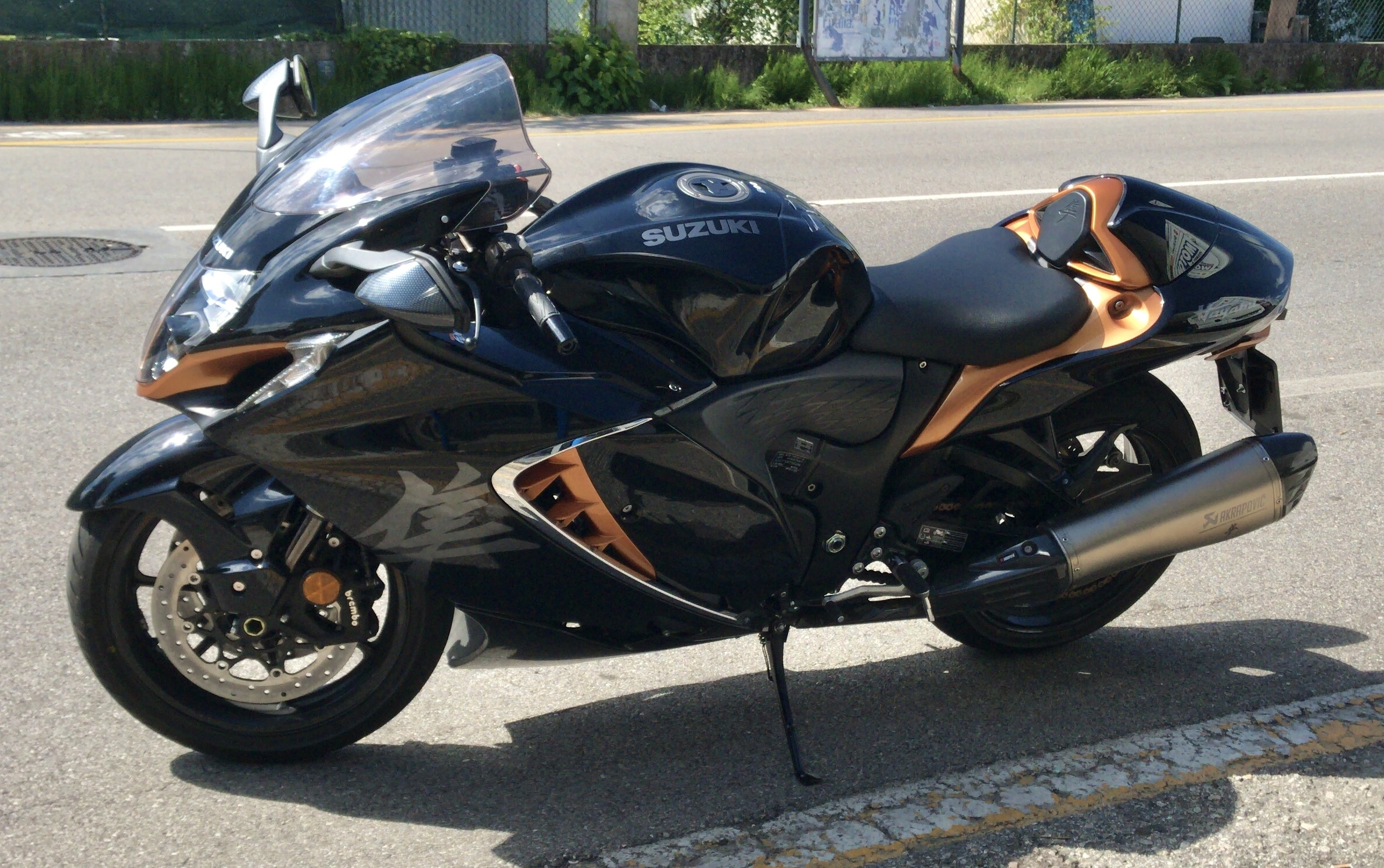
- Also called: GSX1300RR
- Engine: 1,340 cc (82 cu in), four-stroke inline-four, liquid-cooled, DOHC, 16-valve, Keihin/Denso fuel Injection, wet sump
- Bore / stroke: 81.0 mm × 65.0 mm (3.19 in × 2.56 in)
- Compression ratio: 12.5:1
- Power: 140 kW (190 hp) @9,700 rpm (claimed)
- Torque: 150 N⋅m (110 lbf⋅ft) @ 7,000 rpm (claimed)
- Transmission: 6-speed constant-mesh sequential manual, slipper clutch
- Suspension: KYB adjustable preload, adjustable rebound damping and adjustable compression damping: Front: 43 mm DLC inverted telescopic, coil spring; Rear: link-type, gas/oil damped
- Brakes: Front: 4-piston 320 mm dual discs Brembo Stylema radial mount calipers; Rear: 1-piston 260 mm Nissin single disc
- Tires: Bridgestone Battlax Hypersport S22; Front: 120/70-ZR-17; Rear: 190/50-ZR-17
- Rake, trail: 23° 00', 90 mm
- Wheelbase: 1,480 mm (58 in)
- Dimensions: L: 2,180 mm (86 in); W: 735 mm (28.9 in); H: 1,165 mm (45.9 in)
- Seat height: 800 mm (31 in)
- Weight: 264 kg (582 lb) (wet)
- Fuel capacity: 20 L (4.4 imp gal; 5.3 US gal)
- Fuel consumption: 6.7 L/100 km; 42 mpg_{‑imp} (35 mpg_{‑US}) (claimed)

The third-generation Hayabusa was announced on February 5, 2021. Cycle World and Motorcyclist magazines referred to the third generation 2022 model year Hayabusa as GSX1300RR rather than GSX1300R, with no mention of what that might signify.

== Sales ==
Typically, a new sportbike model sells well in its first year, and then sees its numbers decline every year as it grows older. The Hayabusa reversed this pattern, selling in greater numbers every year from the 1999 launch through the 2008 revision. From its debut in 1999 to June 2007 over 100,000 Hayabusas were sold worldwide. In the United States in each of the years 2005 and 2006, over 10,000 units were sold.

It was predicted that the gentlemen's agreement speed cap would hurt sales, because buyers would not want a bike that was hobbled with a speed limiter, even riders who would never approach the hypothetical maximum. However, sales in the United States increased year after year between its release in 1999 and 2006, rising from just a few thousand units in 1999 to over 10,000 in 2006.

== Competitive motorsports ==
Many riders have found that the Hayabusa lends itself well to any number of functional purposes, including competitive motorsports.

The Hayabusa has been used in sanctioned closed course road racing, drag racing, and top speed competition.

Top speeds of over 270 mph, engine outputs of over 700 horsepower, and performances in the standing quarter mile as quick as 6.9 seconds and as fast as 209.14

On July 17, 2011, riding a highly modified turbocharged Suzuki Hayabusa, Bill Warner set a new world motorcycle land speed record of 311.945 mph (502.027 km/h) from a standing start to 1.5 miles at the Loring Timing Association's Land Speed Race, held at the Loring Commerce Centre (the former Loring Air Force Base) in Limestone, Maine.

== Custom versions ==
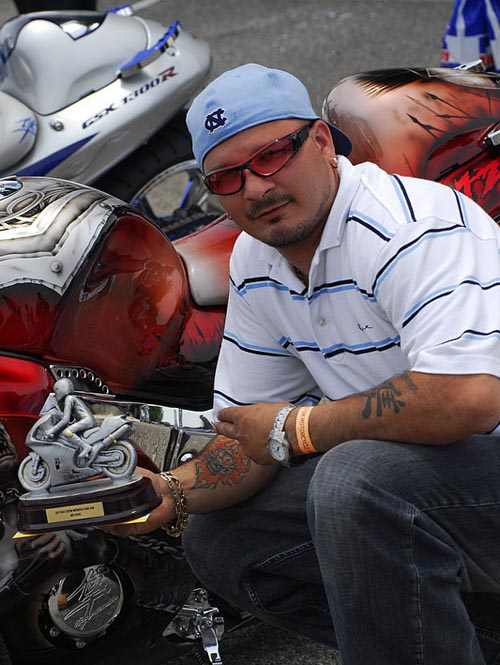
Custom trophy winner with Hayabusa logo tattoo at Black Bike Week 2008

The Hayabusa has long been one of the most popular motorcycles for streetbike customization, owing in part to its distinctive and easily recognizable bodywork. Its engine’s tunability, the extensive availability of aftermarket parts, and the interchangeability of Suzuki components between models also contributed to its popularity within the custom motorcycle scene. The prominence of this culture later prompted Suzuki to seek feedback and inspiration from the American customization community during the development of the second-generation model.

Bikes are usually built around a theme, such as a NASCAR-inspired bike with retro-70s chrome wheels, racing numbers, flames, and sponsor insignia reminiscent of a stock car, or a bike that takes its cues from popular films, such as Freddy Krueger of A Nightmare on Elm Street. Other common motifs in custom artwork are sexy women, skulls, bones and other gruesome figures, and money and bling, such as "Ben Franklins," $100 bills.

Media related to Custom Hayabusas at Wikimedia Commons

=== Power enhancement ===
Horsepower enhancements like nitrous injection, which can add 100 bhp (75 kW), and turbocharging, which can raise power to more than 600 bhp (450 kW), are common.

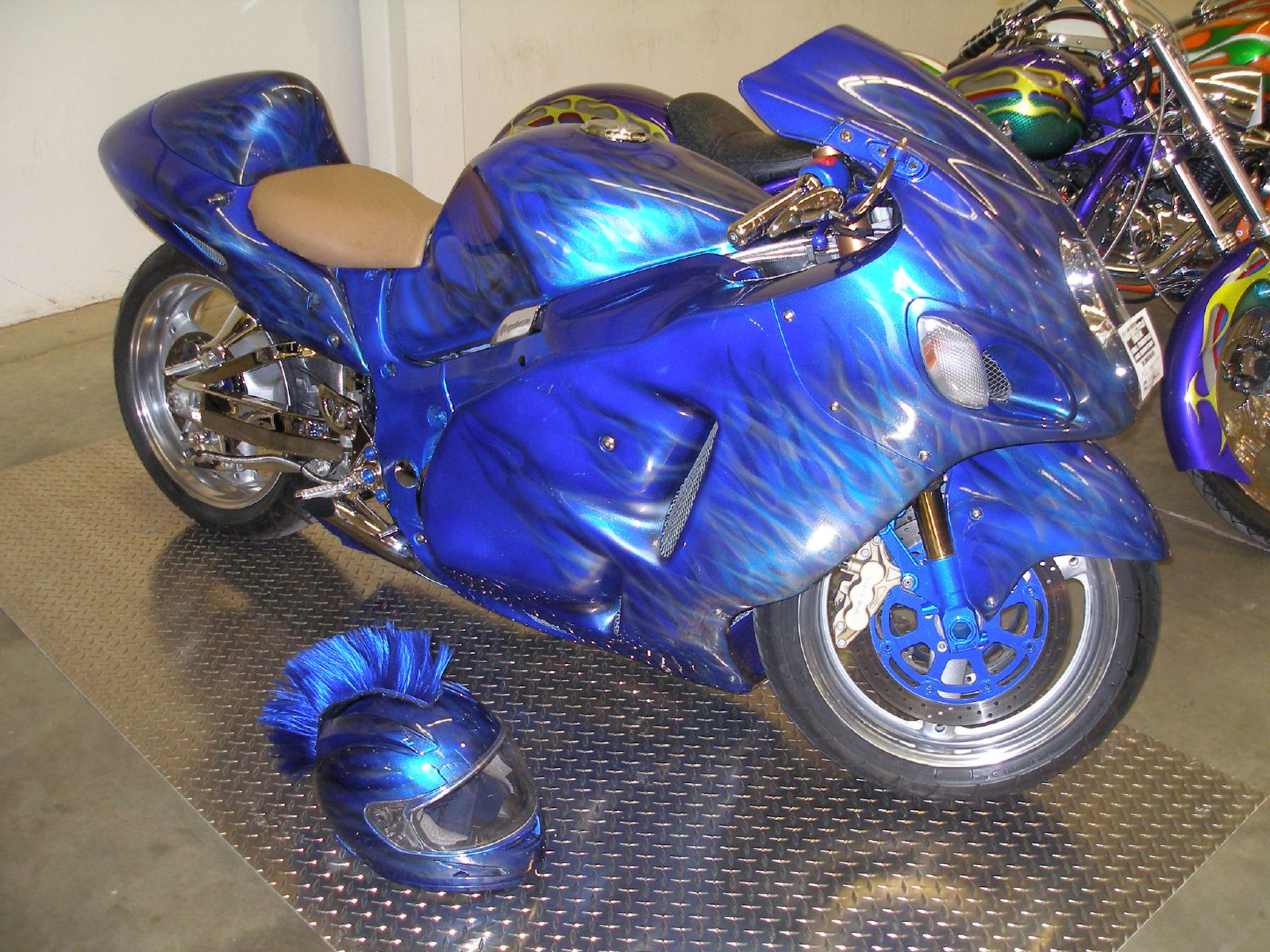
A blue customized Hayabusa

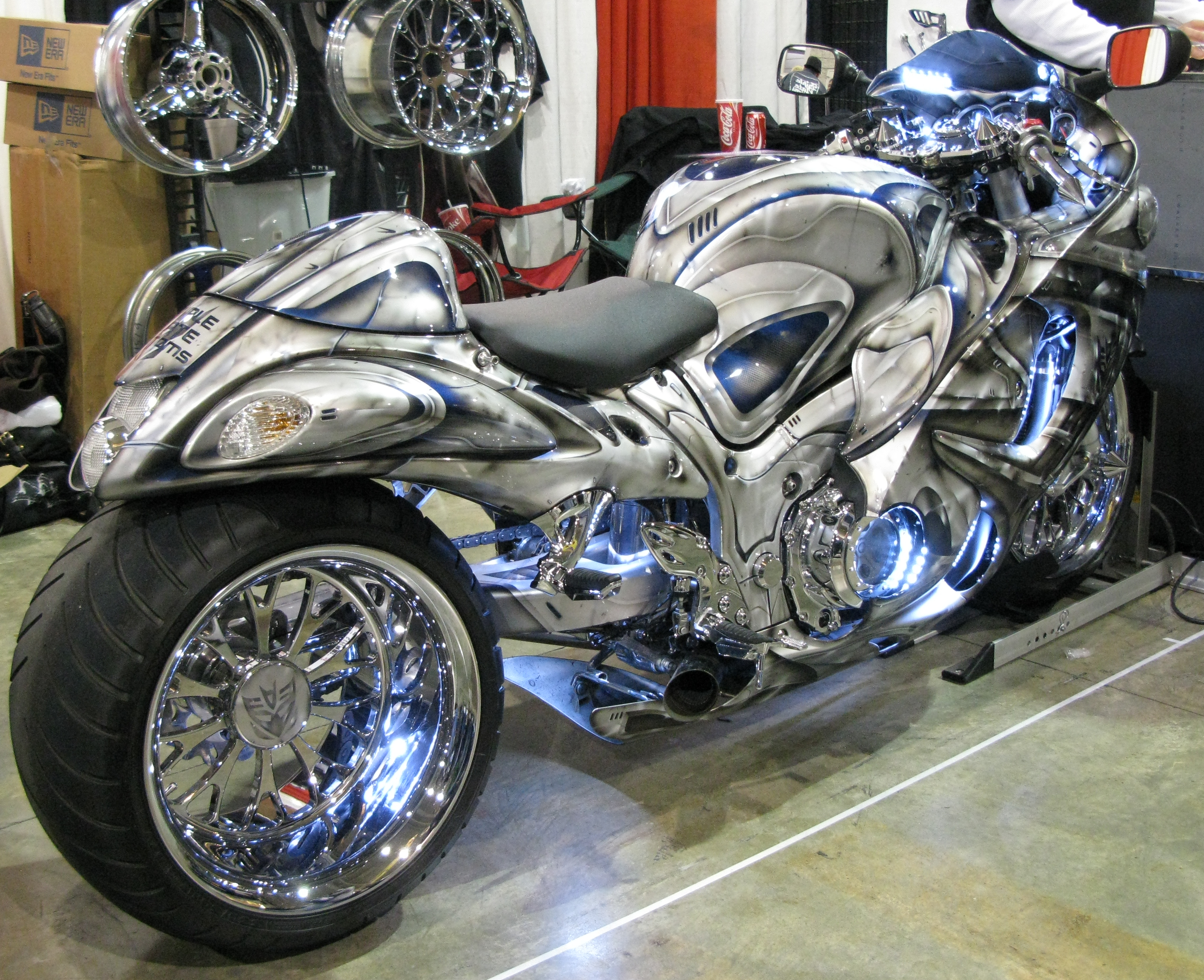
Notable on this example are an extended single-sided swingarm and the appropriation of the Decepticon logo.

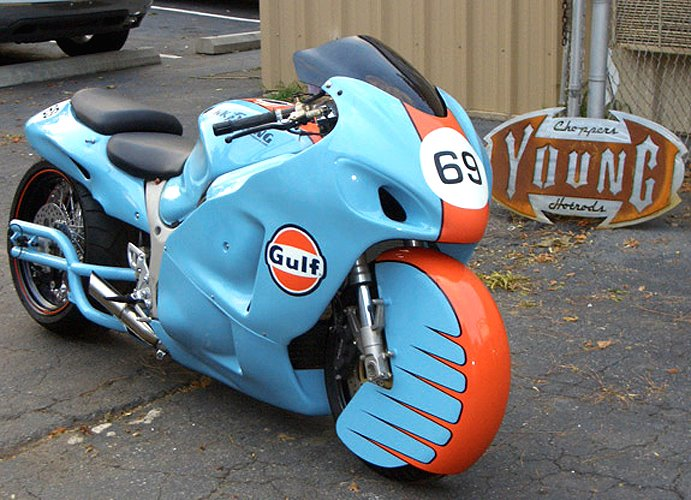
A more retro theme with an enclosing front wheel fender, Gulf Racing livery, and a parody of the Goodyear logo.

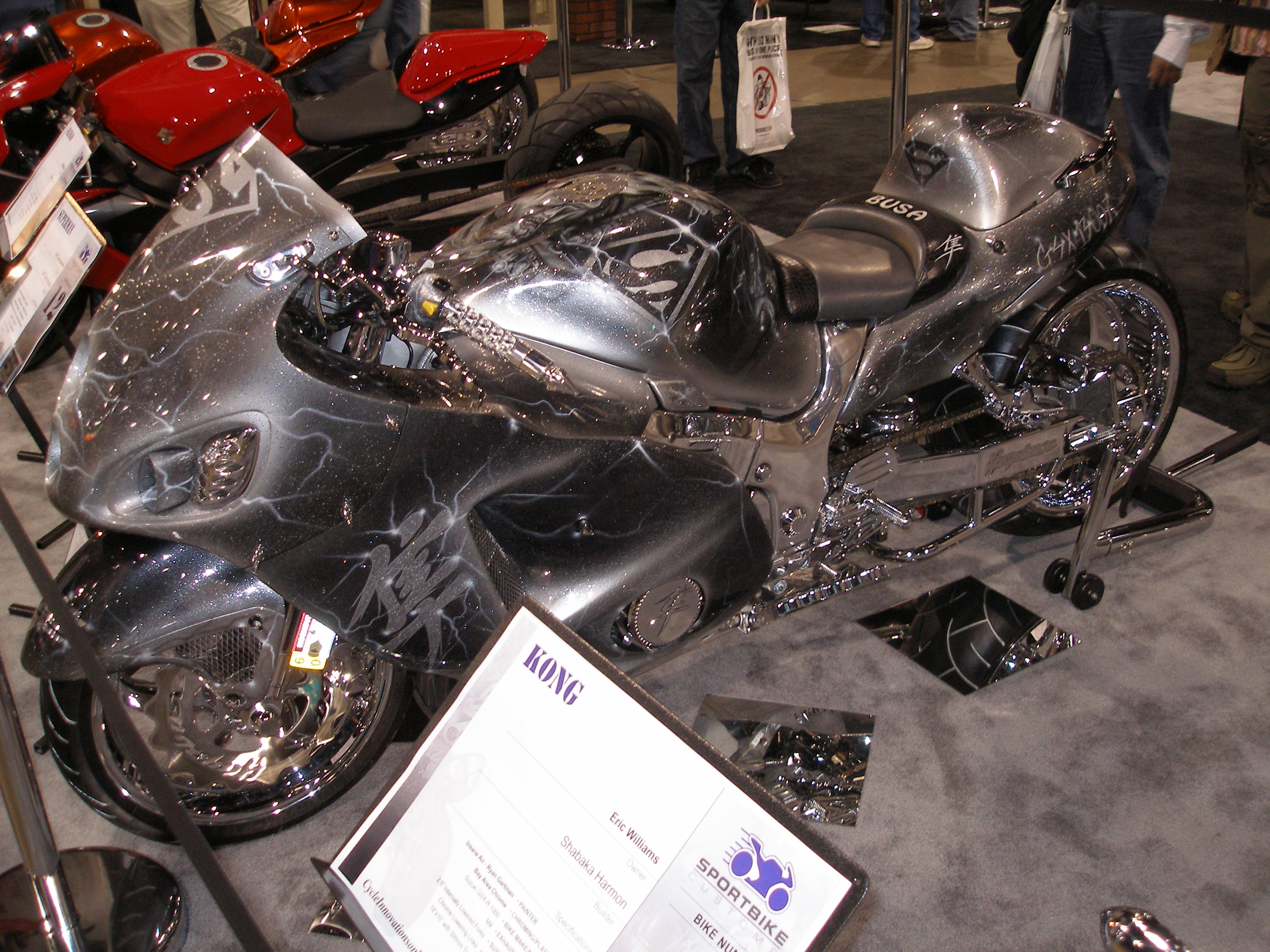
The Superman-themed "Kong" glitters at a show.

== Police use ==
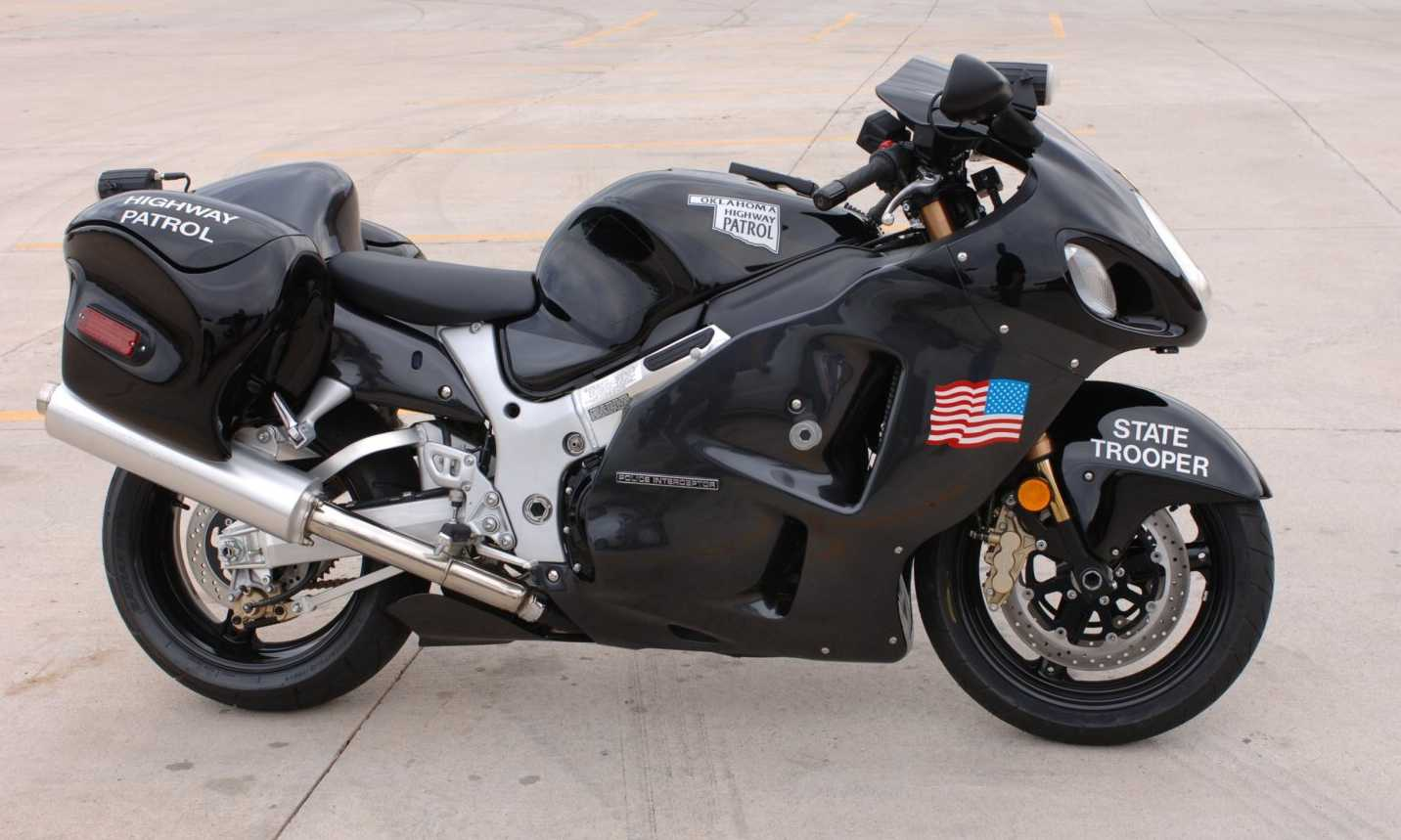
Oklahoma Highway Patrol Hayabusa

In 2006 the Oklahoma Highway Patrol (OHP) converted a seized Hayabusa into a pursuit vehicle, setting up the bike with equipment including a radar unit, police lights, and siren, and painting it in official colors and insignia. Impressed with the positive response from the public and the motorcycling community, the OHP purchased two more Hayabusas, to supplement their main fleet of Harley-Davidson police motorcycles. While they are used for patrol, the primary function of the Hayabusas is public relations and community outreach, due to the kind of attention the exotic bikes attract. According to the OHP, "There are clear lines dividing sportbike and cruiser motorcycle riders. We feel the sportbike community has not been given the proper amount of attention and focus in the area of community involvement and rider safety education."

In 2009, Humberside Police in the United Kingdom put an undercover Hayabusa on the road, equipped with speed detection equipment and a video camera, as part of Operation Achilles, which aimed to catch speeding motorists and motorcyclists.

In the town of Arecibo, Puerto Rico, the Puerto Rico Police operates a "superbike unit" composed entirely of seized Hayabusas that have been outfitted with lights, sirens, police livery and radar equipment for speed enforcement duty in the northern region of Puerto Rico.

In late 2021, the Arecibo municipal government announced the acquisition of seized vehicles for the Arecibo Municipal Police in conjunction with the Puerto Rico Department of Justice, among them a Hayabusa. Like the Hayabusas owned by the PRPD, this Hayabusa has been outfitted with lights, sirens and police livery to be used as a patrol vehicle in Villas del Capitán Correa, located at the northern part of the town.

== Other uses of the Hayabusa engine ==
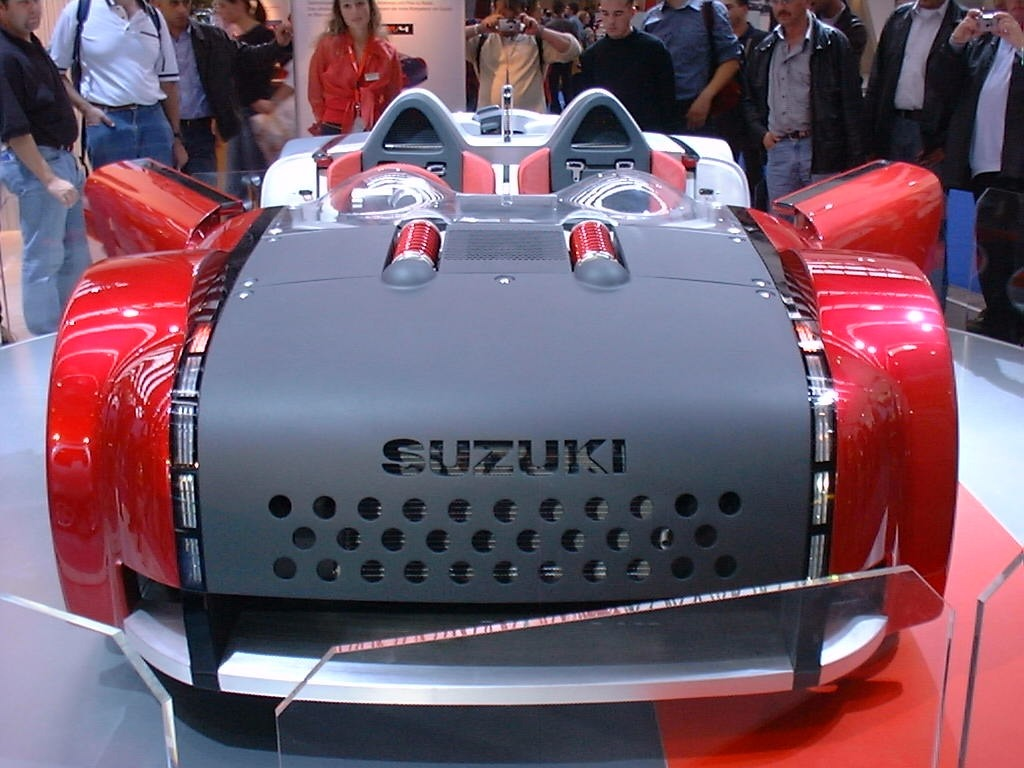
Suzuki GSX-R/4

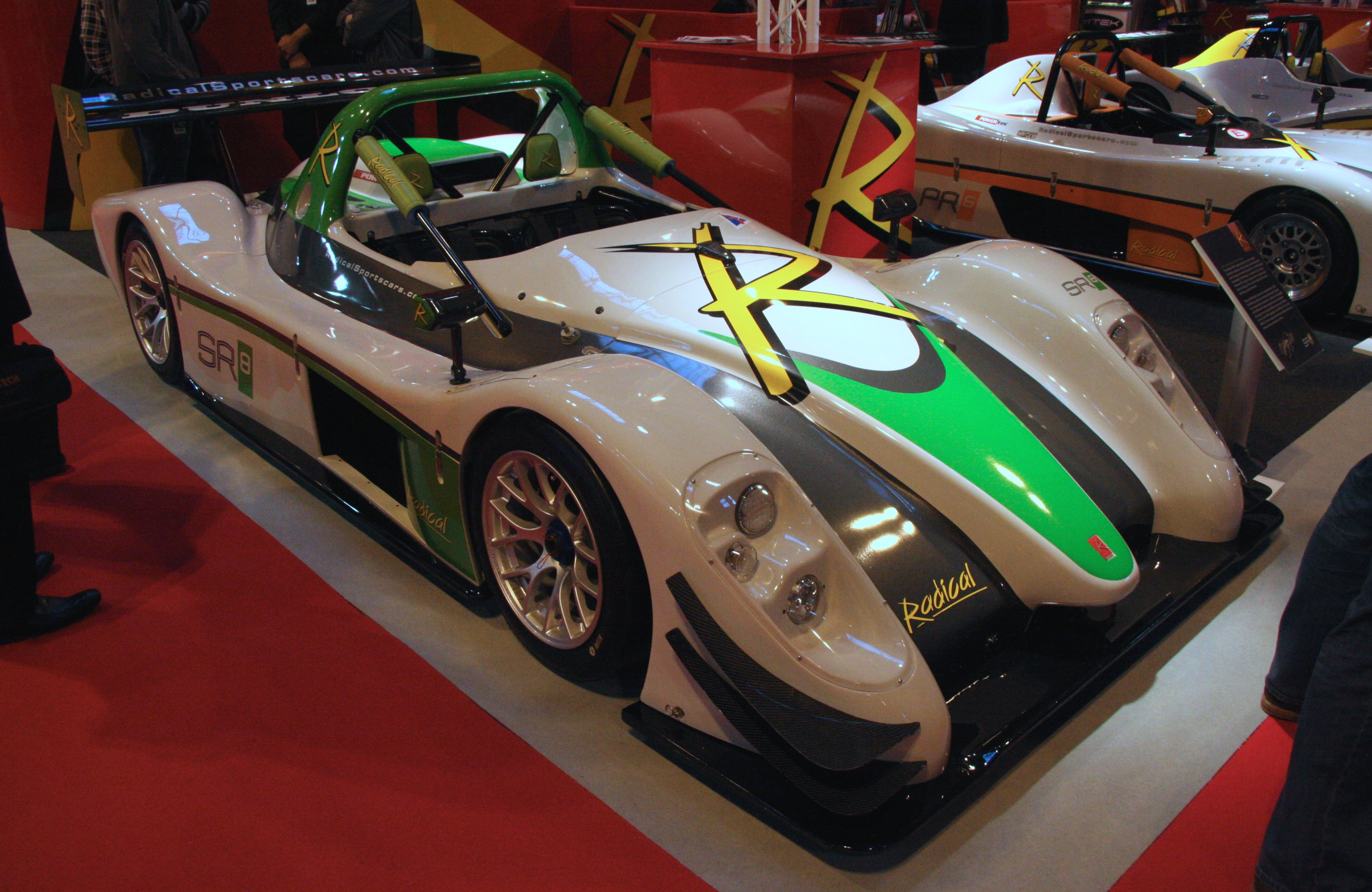
Radical SR8

The high-powered lightweight engine in the Hayabusa lends itself to non-motorcycle applications. The Westfield Megabusa is an English sports car, based on the Lotus Seven, which uses the Hayabusa engine. Suzuki was the first to put the motorcycle's engine in a car, with two concept cars in 2001, the Suzuki GSX-R/4 roadster and the Formula Hayabusa, an open wheel race car "designed for a new Japanese one-make competition series."

Mike Akatiff's 2004 land speed record attempt TOP 1 Ack Attack streamliner used twin Hayabusa engines in an attempt to exceed 483 km/h (300 mph) at Bonneville Salt Flats. In 2006 and again in 2008 Akatiff's Ack Attack, ridden by Rocky Robinson, succeeded, first going 552 km/h (342.797 mph) in 2006, only to be surpassed two days later, then returning in 2008 to set another new record of 581 km/h (360.913 mph). That record stood until 24 September 2009, when it was broken by Chris Carr with a speed of 591 km/h (367.382 mph).

Radical Sportscars use the Hayabusa engine in stock form in their SR1 entry level race car and in a modified form up to 1.6L in their SR3 and PR6 cars. They also designed a 2.8 L (170 cu in) V8 engine based on the inline-four Hayabusa engine using dual Hayabusa cylinder heads mated to a custom bottom end, known as the Powertec RPA V8 engine to power their SR8 car. The 455 bhp (339 kW) sports car set the record for the fastest production car at Nürburgring.

The Hyper Racer X1, designed by Jon and Dean Crooke, is fitted with a standard Gen2 Hayabusa engine. With ground effects and a weight of only 400 kg the Hyper Racer X1 holds outright and class lap records.

John Hartley, president of a custom printing machine manufacturer, created a 75° V8 engine producing 400 bhp (300 kW) and 332–339 N⋅m (245–250 lb⋅ft) torque that weighs 200 lb (91 kg), based on the Hayabusa engine, initially intended to power his Caterham Seven sports car. One of Hartley's engines has also been put in an Ariel Atom open wheel roadster.

SmartBUSA sells a conversion kit to install Hayabusa engines in Smart Cars.

The Vitabusa is a race car original designed by West Racing Cars, appeared in PIC, Taiwan.

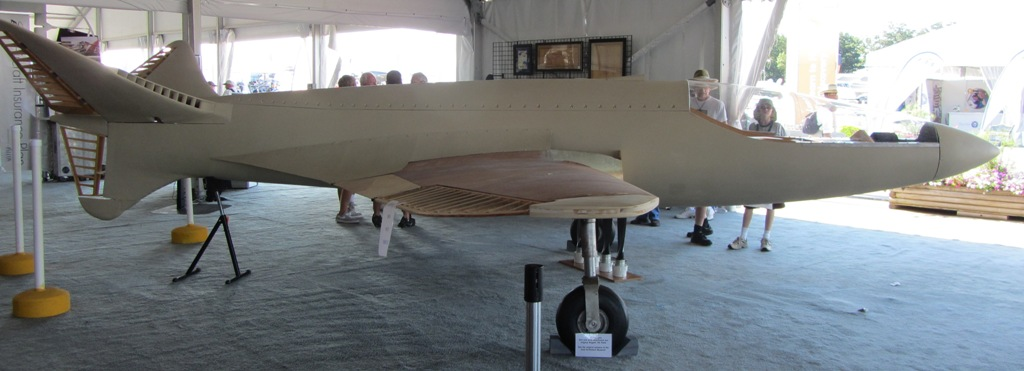
Bugatti 100P replica in progress in 2011

A project to build a modern replica of the 1939 Bugatti Model 100 air racer used twin Suzuki Hayabusa engines in place of the original design's pair of supercharged straight-eight engine.

Hayabusa engines have been used in sandrails, lightweight space frame off-road vehicles for sand dune racing and recreation. While many sandrails used in events like the Abu Dhabi Desert Challenge have relied on car V8 engines, lighter motorcycle engine like the Hayabusa 1300 gives the sand car advantages in acceleration and maneuverability.

Introducing the Suzuki Vision Gran Turismo: the 'Hayabusa' Engine and Electrification Technology in an AWD Super Sport. The base chassis is a front-engine, rear-wheel drive layout with a front mid-mounted engine, but adds electrification technology to combine the engine with electric motors, to complete the all-wheel drive system. The front mid-mounted engine is a 1340 cc inline 4 cylinder used on Suzuki's ‘Hayabusa’ flagship sports bike. Furthermore, a total of three motors, two for the front drive and one for the rear drive, have been added. The combined total output of the system is 318 kW (432 PS) / 9700 rpm, with a maximum torque of 610 Nm (62 kgfm).

The Hayabusa engine has also proven a popular choice for use in single seaters within the British Hillclimb Championship, due to the integrated gearbox and light weight packaging. They are used in various configurations, ranging from stock sized engines, enlarged naturally aspirated engines, supercharged and turbocharger conversions. It is also not uncommon to see these engines run on methanol fuel, since it allows the naturally aspirated engines to run higher compression ratios and the force induction engines to not use an intercooler, thus further saving weight in the car. One of the more successful Hayabusa powered single seaters is the GWR Raptor, designed by Graeme Wight Jr. These cars have produced up to 480 hp while weighing less than 400 kg with a driver aboard and prove competitive against the larger, heavier and more powerful V8 cars.

== Notes ==
Records
Preceded by Honda CBR1100XX	Fastest production motorcycle 1999	Succeeded by Kawasaki ZX-12R
