= Radical Sportscars =

British car manufacturer

Radical Motorsport Limited
- Type: Private
- Industry: Automotive
- Founded: 1997
- Founders: Phil Abbott; Mick Hyde
- Headquarters: Peterborough, United Kingdom
- Products: Sports cars
- Revenue: £20m?
- Number of employees: 140
- Website: www.radicalmotorsport.com

Radical Motorsport Limited, also known as Radical Sportscars, is a British manufacturer and constructor of racing cars. The company was founded in January 1997 by amateur drivers and engineers Mick Hyde and Phil Abbott, who built open-cockpit sportscars that could be registered for road use and run on a track without modification. Radical produces a mix of purpose-built race cars as well as road-legal sports cars in varying specifications. Their most popular car is the Radical SR3.

== History ==
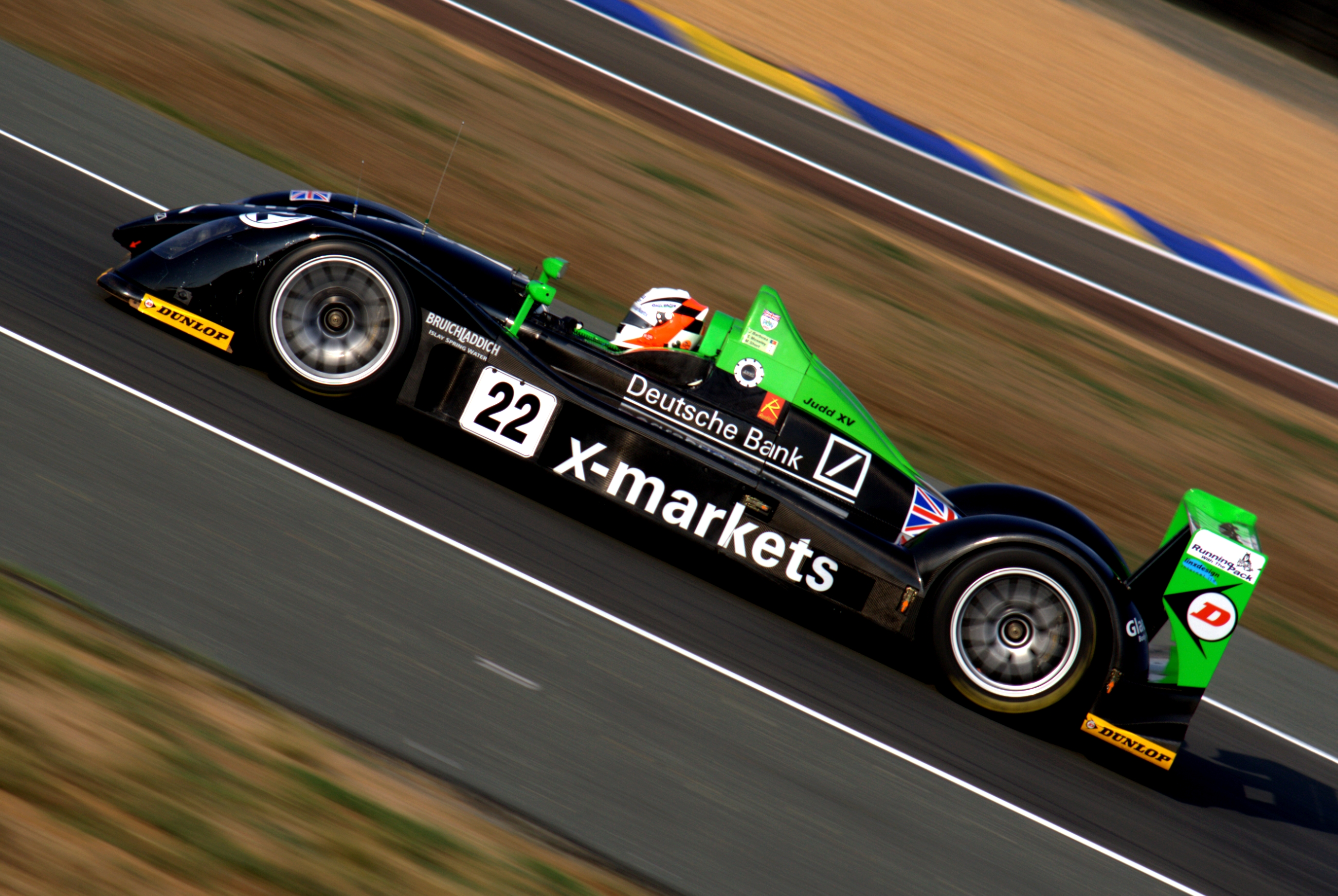
Rollcentre Racing's Radical SR9 at the 2006 24 Hours of Le Mans

The company's first car, built by Phil Abbott in 1996, the Radical 1100 Clubsport, was based on a Kawasaki motorcycle engine placed inside a small open-cockpit chassis. The cars were intended to run in the 750 Motor Club's races under the Sports 2000 category, with founders Abbott and Hyde driving.

In 1999, Radical had built enough 1100 Clubsports that they decided to create a one-make series based around the car. Backed by the British Racing and Sports Car Club, the series featured identical cars that were open to anyone who owned an 1100 Clubsport. The same year, Radical debuted their second model, the Prosport. Available with Kawasaki or Suzuki engine up to 1500 cc in displacement, the Prosports were even more powerful and faster than the Clubsports, and included F3-size slick tyres and an adjustable rear wing. The cars were also brought to the United States for the first time, for use in the SCCA D-Sport class in 2000.

Launched in 2001, Radical's next creation was the two-seater SR3, a car which could compete in international racing, such as the FIA's C3 class. The car uses a Suzuki-based engine tuned by Powertec (now RPE) which offered 1300 cc or 1500 cc versions and a maximum of 260 hp (190 kW) in the latter. An enclosed gear drive unit was developed specifically for the car to replace the traditional motorcycle engine chain drive.

In 2006, Radical would make its largest leap into international motorsport with the development of the SR9, a complete Le Mans Prototype in the LMP2 class. Official partner Rollcentre Racing would debut the car with success in the Le Mans Series and 24 Hours of Le Mans, and SR9s in the hands of independent teams would contest the 24 Hours of Le Mans a further four times. Greaves Motorsport | Team Bruichladdich also raced at Le Mans in 2007/8/9. Company owner Tim Greaves raced the AER powered SR9 2007 and 2008. DNFs due to crashes

== Current models ==
The Radical model range has seven different models in various options, most notably in the powerplants, are available on all of the cars.

=== SR1 ===
The SR1 is the first Radical to have its own racing series – The SR1 Cup – a club, owner-driven racing series that combines competition with training. The SR1 is priced at £44,500 + VAT. It is powered by a 182 horsepower RPE-Suzuki four-cylinder engine capable of propelling the car from 0–60 mph in 3.5 seconds and eventually to a top speed of 138 mph (222 km/h). It is capable of 2.3 g of lateral acceleration.

=== SR3 ===
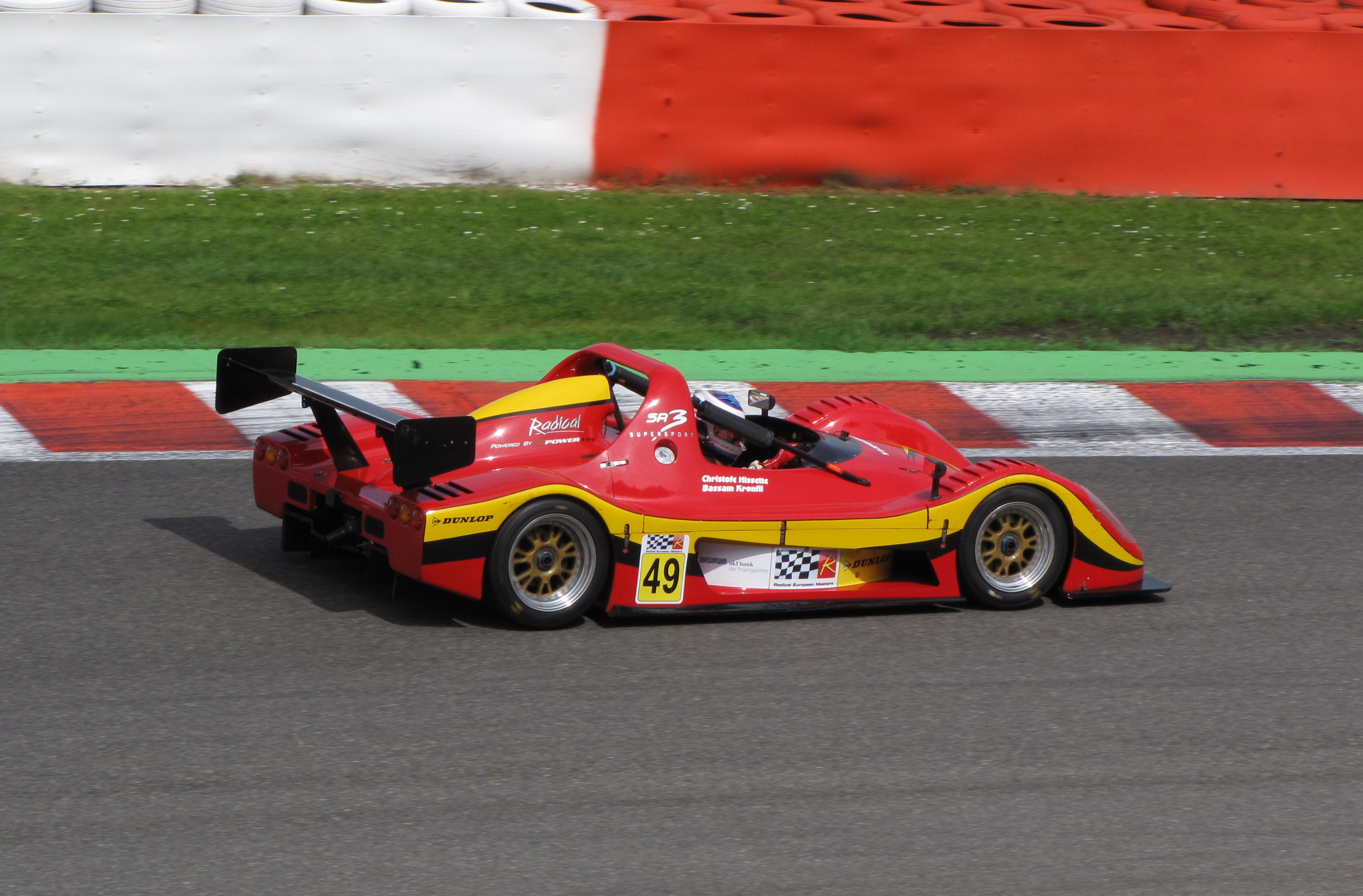
An SR3 at Spa in 2009

The SR3 is the most popular Radical model, with over 1,000 units built. Although some subtle styling changes have taken place, the fundamental car has not changed since its conception. The car is built on a carbon-steel spaceframe chassis with polyester bodywork, and is powered by a hand built RPE racing spec 4-cylinder engine for power which produces 225 hp (168 kW) at the wheels. This allows it to accelerate from 0-60 mph (97 km/h) in 3.1 seconds and on to a top speed of 147 mph (237 km/h).

=== SR4 ===
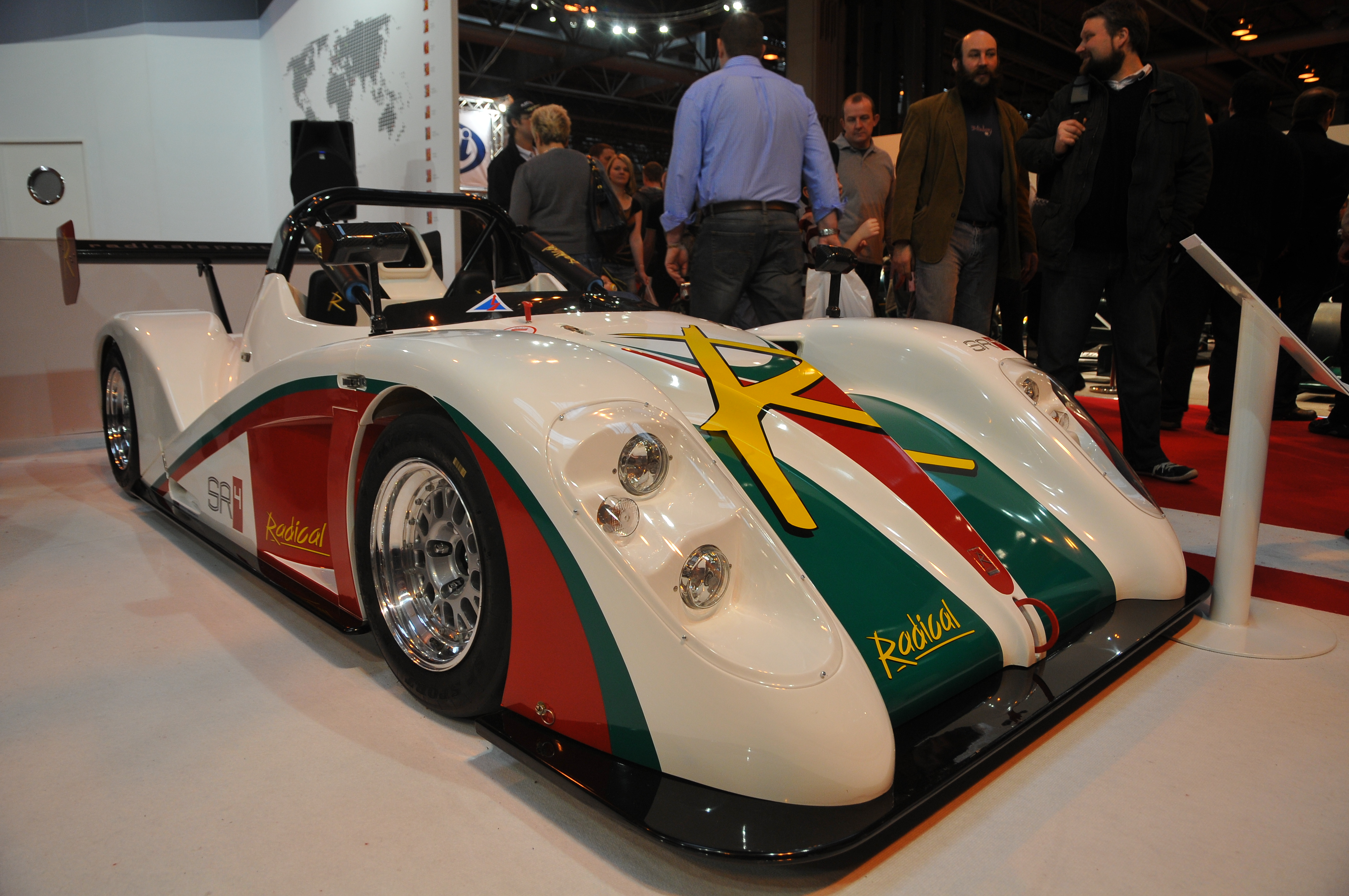
A Radical SR4 at the Autosport International The Racing Car Show Birmingham in 2011

The SR4 was intended as the smaller sibling of the SR3, however it sold extremely poorly. The 1200 will do 0-100 km/h (62 mph) in 3.7 seconds, the quarter mile in 12.4 seconds, and has a top speed of 234 km/h (145 mph).

=== SR8 ===
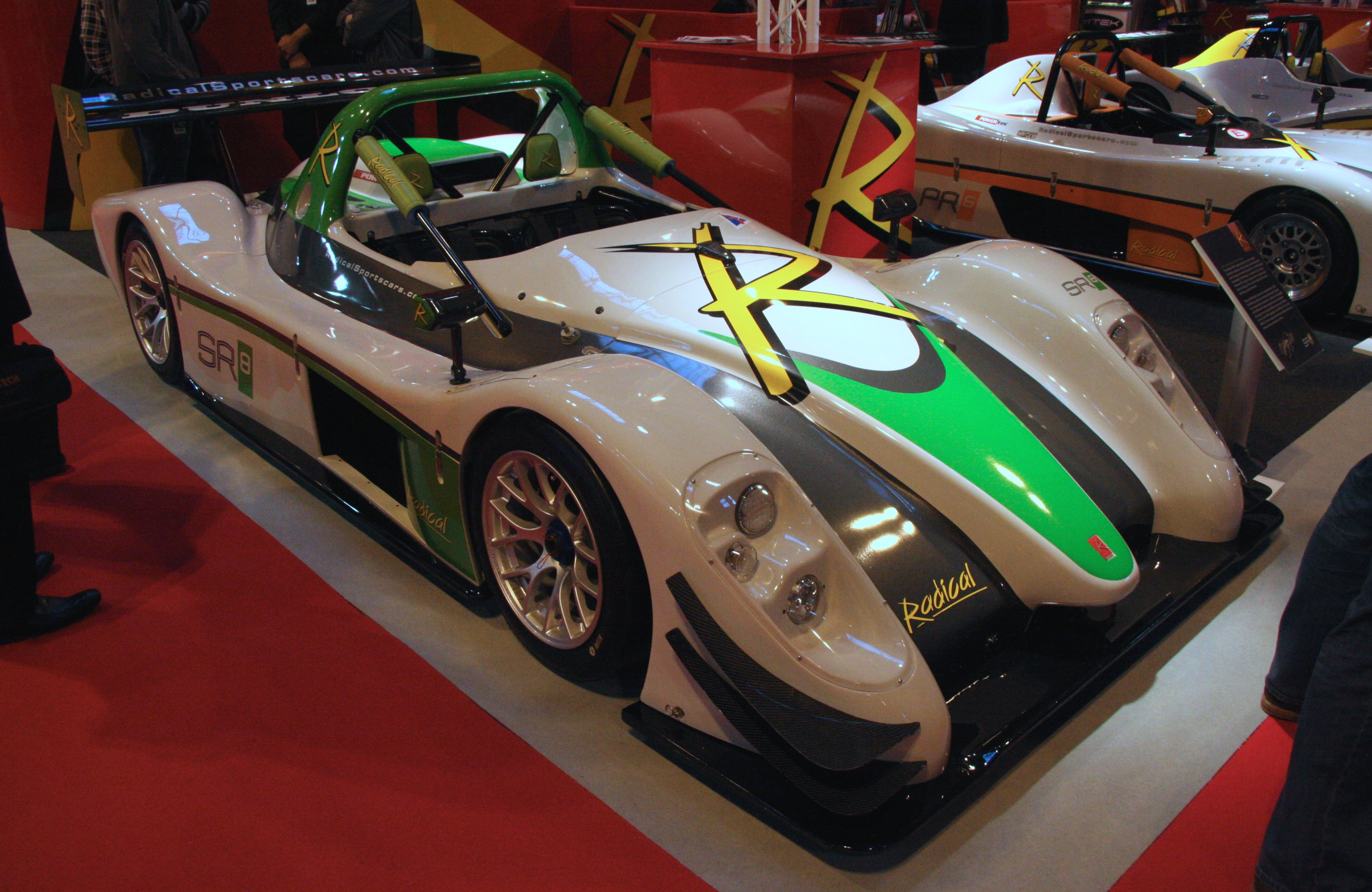
The Radical SR8

Based on the SR3, the SR8 is a more extreme version intended for track use, but can be registered for the road. The SR8 also features one of the largest engines Radical has ever put in their cars, with the 2700 cc RPE RPX V8 constructed by combining elements of Suzuki inline-4s, and producing 430 hp (321 kW). A further variant, known as the SR8LM, increased the engine size to 2800 cc and brought power output to 455 hp (339 kW). In August 2009, Michael Vergers, driving an SR8LM, set the new lap record (6 minutes, 48 seconds) for a road legal production car at the Nürburgring Nordschleife circuit. This record was beaten by the 991 generation Porsche 911 GT2 in September 2017 with a time of 6:47.25.

It is capable of 0–60 mph in 2.7 seconds, a top speed of 178 mph (286 km/h), and 2.5 g's of lateral acceleration.

One SR8 was converted into an electric car by a team of students Racing Green Endurance from Imperial College London to drive the full length of the Pan-American Highway in May, 2010. The project aims to challenge commonly held perceptions surrounding electric vehicles performance and range.

The TMG EV P001 is a road-legal electric sports car by Toyota Motorsport GmbH, based on a modified Radical SR8 chassis.

=== SR10 ===
Also based on the SR3, the SR10 features a Ford EcoBoost 2.3L, 4 cylinder, turbocharged engine which brings durability and longer service intervals to a similar platform to the SR8. The motor produces 425 hp (317 kW) and 380 lb⋅ft (515 N⋅m) of torque, which propels the SR10 and from 0-60 mph (97 km/h) in 2.4 seconds and on to a top speed of 180 mph (290 km/h). The SR10 continues to use the proven steel space-frame Chassis and Polyester bodywork.

=== RXC ===
The RXC is a midrange track car between the SR3 and SR8. It is street legal in most countries. It is currently the only closed-top Radical track car level. It is propelled by a Ford Cyclone 3.7 Ti-VCT V6 producing 380 hp (283 kW) and 320 lb⋅ft (434 N⋅m) of torque. The base version is capable of 0-60 mph in 2.8 seconds and a top speed of 175 mph (282 km/h). At its top speed, the RXC produces 900 kg of downforce, equaling its curb weight. A turbocharged version is also available, called the RXC Turbo 500. It produces 530 hp (395 kW) and 481 lb⋅ft (652 N⋅m) of torque. Top speed is estimated to be 185 mph (298 km/h), with 0-60 mph acceleration estimated at 2.4 seconds. Production of the RXC began in late 2013 at £111,689.

The RXC Spyder is the open top variant of the RXC V8. The standard engine is an RPE 3000 cc V8 producing 440 hp (328 kW) and the engines maximum power is achieved at 10,500 rpm. The car is built with a seven-speed sequential transmission with paddle shifters fitted as standard, and the car features aerodynamics and styling cues taken from the SR9 LMP2 project. It has a carbon-steel spaceframe based on those of the RXC V8 and the SR9 LMP2. Later updated to the Ford Ecoboost twin turbo V6 engine with 654 hp (488 kW), and a Quaife 6 speed sequential gearbox, it is capable of 0–60 mph in 2.7 seconds and a top speed of 178 mph (286 km/h).

The RXC V8 is a track day car that is also used in top tier motorsport. It is powered by the same 3-liter V8 as the RXC Spyder.

== Motorsport ==
=== One-make series ===
Although Radical began by competing in existing events, it was Radical's creation of their own series that have been the choice of competition for most owners. Radical currently supports 14 official Radical race series around the world.

In the UK the seven round Radical Challenge championship also runs within the MSVR package, with each meeting featuring two 15-minute qualifying sessions and a pair of 20-minute sprint races, and a 40-minute endurance race with the opportunity for one or two drivers per car. Teams are limited to one set of tyres per weekend, limiting costs and levelling competition.

The Radical SR1 Cup is Open to drivers who have either never held a race licence before, or are still eligible to wear a novice cross on the rear of the car (meaning they have competed in less than six races), the SR1 Cup will lead the drivers through the process of getting on the grid, with a detailed programme of driver training and technical tuition.

In the UK there are also two other main championships open to radical cars. The Open Sportscar Series can accept almost any radical car whilst the Radical Owners Club Bikesports Championship can accommodate cars fitted with bike engines such as the SR1, SR3 and PR6.

Around the world there are numerous Radical single-marque racing championships, running to regulations that broadly mirror those of Radical UK and European racing series.

In North America, there are the following primary series:

- Radical Canada Cup that visits several tracks in eastern Canada as well as a single trip to a US track. It is now split into a Western and an Eastern series
- Radical Cup North America which usually runs alongside United States Auto Club or Indycar events.

Australia's national series for the marque is the Radical Cup Australia, after two separate earlier series were merged in 2022.

The Gulf Radical Cup, promoted by Dubai-based Radical dealer GulfSport Racing has been running since 2006 at the Dubai Autodrome, Yas Marina Circuit and Bahrain International Circuit, and has attracted drivers from more than 20 countries.

=== Le Mans ===
In the second quarter of 2005, the company announced its plans to race in the LMP2 class of the Le Mans Series with their new SR9. The British Rollcentre Racing team would run the first chassis using Judd power before being joined later in the season by a Tim Greaves. Chairman and owner of Radical Motorsport set up his own team team, known as Team Bruichladdich Radical, who used the AER powerplant. Both teams would score their only points of the season at Nürburgring, with Rollcentre taking third in LMP2 and Radical finishing in fifth. Team Bruichladdich, now Greaves Motorsport, came third in Valencia.

Rollcentre would also run the company's first entry in the 24 Hours of Le Mans. Although the car finished in a distant 20th place, the car was able to prove its reliability by being able to finish the race only months after being completed. The Team Bruichladdich Radical squad also flew to the United States for the final round to of the American Le Mans Series, where Radical Chairman, Tim Greaves raced with his own Team Bruichladdich / Greaves Motorsport whilst also supporting Van de Steur Racing in the third SR9 completed. Tim Greaves owns the rights to the Radical SR9 and the spares moulds and design which are held by Greaves Motorsport, based in Yaxley.

For 2007, Rollcentre sold their SR9 as they moved onto a new LMP1 Pescarolo. Embassy Racing purchased the car and continued running it in the Le Mans Series alongside the factory Radical, while Van der Steur would run a partial schedule in the American Le Mans Series. For 2008, Italian team World Racing Cars purchased the Judd-powered SR9 from Embassy with Swiss team Race Performance contesting the 2010 event.

=== British Formula Ford ===
Radical made its debut as a race team in the 2013 British Formula Ford season. Radical signed longtime Radical racer James Abbott to represent the brand in Formula Ford. In the new for 2013 Ford EcoBoost powered Radical chose for the new Sinter LA12 chassis produced by Fluid Motorsports. Former Formula Ford racer Robbie Kerr joined the team as a driver coach for James Abbott. After three rounds, with little success, Radical decided to replace the Sinter with a Mygale M13-SJ. While JTR's Dan Cammish dominated the season, Radical had a reasonable season. After switching to Mygale the results improved, finishing with two third-place finishes in the last three races at Brands Hatch.

== Racecars ==
| Year | Car | Image | Category |
|---|---|---|---|
| 2002 | Radical SR3 | | Group CN |
| 2004 | Radical SR4 | | Group CN |
| 2005 | Radical SR8 | | Group CN |
| 2006 | Radical SR9 | | LMP2 |
| 2007 | Radical SR5 | | Group CN |
| 2007 | Radical SR8LM | | Group CN |
| 2008 | Radical SR10 | | LMP1 |
| 2011 | Radical SR8 RX | | Group CN |
| 2012 | Radical SR10 | | LMP2 |
| 2013 | Radical SR1 | | Group CN |
| 2013 | Radical RXC | | Group CN |
| 2014 | Radical RXC Turbo | | Group CN |
| 2015 | Radical RXC Spyder | | Group CN |
| 2015 | Radical RXC Turbo 500 | | Group CN |
| 2016 | Radical RXC GT3 | | Group GT3 |
| 2016 | Radical RXC Turbo 500R | | Group CN |
| 2017 | Radical RXC Turbo 600R | | Group CN |
| 2017 | Radical SR8 SRX | | Group CN |
| 2019 | Radical Rapture | | Group CN |
| 2020 | Radical SR10 | | Group CN |
| 2023 | Radical SR1 XXR | | Group CN |

== See also ==
- List of car manufacturers of the United Kingdom
