= Radical SR8 =

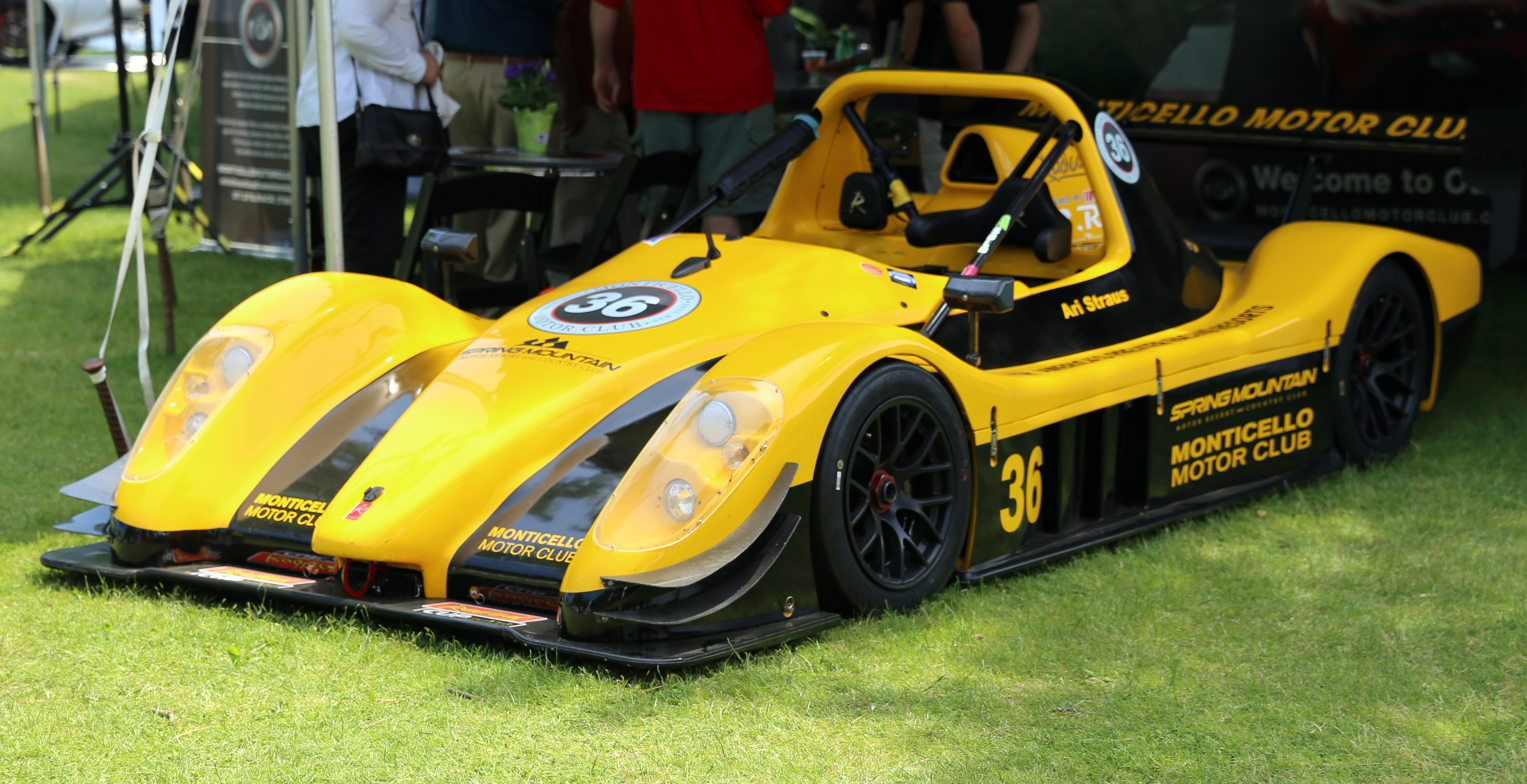

Overview
- Manufacturer: Radical Sportscars
- Production: 2005-
- Assembly: Peterborough, United Kingdom
- Designer: Nick Walford

Body and chassis
- Class: Sports car
- Body style: Roadster
- Layout: longitudinal mounted mid-engine, rear-wheel drive

Powertrain
- Transmission: Powertec P-Tec 6-speed sequential manual

Dimensions
- Wheelbase: 2,527 mm (99.5 in)
- Length: 4,100 mm (161.4 in)
- Width: 1,790 mm (70.5 in)
- Height: 1,040 mm (40.9 in)

Chronology
- Predecessor: Radical SR3
- Successor: Radical SR10

The Radical SR8 is a British sports car made by Radical Sportscars.

Dominic Dobson drove one to victory in the 2015 Pikes Peak International Hill Climb.

Michael Vergers held the all-time street legal lap record of the Nordschleife circuit on the Nürburgring until 29 June 2010, set in 2009 in a Radical SR8 LM on Dunlop Direzza DZ03 tyres. He clocked a lap time of 6:48:28.

A prototype is being made, with the help of Radical Sportscars, into an all-electric version by Racing Green Endurance, a student-led project of Imperial College London.

== Life cycles ==
Year	Type	Info
2005	SR8	Initial version
2007	SR8LM	More performant version, slightly bigger engine (2.8), improved aerodynamics
2011	SR8 RX	Second generation
2017	SR8 SRX	Third generation

== Trims ==
Name	Displacement	Engine	Horsepower	HP RPM	Torque	Torque RPM	Weight
SR8	2,680 cc (164 cu in; 2.68 L)	Powertec RPA V8	358 bhp (363 PS; 267 kW)	10,500	271 N⋅m (200 lb⋅ft)	8,000	650 kg (1,430 lb)
SR8 LM	2,680 cc (164 cu in; 2.68 L)	Powertec RPB V8	449 bhp (455 PS; 335 kW)	10,500	271 N⋅m (200 lb⋅ft)	8,000	650 kg (1,430 lb)
SR8 RX	2,680 cc (164 cu in; 2.68 L)	Powertec RPB V8	430 bhp (436 PS; 321 kW)	10,500	353 N⋅m (260 lb⋅ft)	8,000	680 kg (1,500 lb)
SR8 TDR	2,680 cc (164 cu in; 2.68 L)	Powertec RPA V8 Twin Turbocharged	800 bhp (811 PS; 597 kW)	11,000	655 N⋅m (483 lb⋅ft)	9,500	600 kg (1,300 lb)
SR8 Supersport	2,680 cc (164 cu in; 2.68 L)	Powertec RPA V8	380 bhp (385 PS; 283 kW)	10,500	305 N⋅m (225 lb⋅ft)	8,000	650 kg (1,430 lb)
SR8 RSX	2,996 cc (182.8 cu in; 2.996 L)	Powertec RPB V8	440 bhp (446 PS; 328 kW)	10,500	380 N⋅m (280 lb⋅ft)	7,500	680 kg (1,500 lb)
SRZero	0 cc (0 cu in; 0 L)	two EVO Electric PM synchronous motors	565 bhp (573 PS; 421 kW)	5,000	1,085 N⋅m (800 lb⋅ft)		1,200 kg (2,600 lb)
