= Powertec RPA =

RPE RP Series V8

Overview
- Manufacturer: Radical Performance Engines
- Designer: Steve Prentice
- Production: Peterborough, England

Layout
- Configuration: 72° V8, 32-valve (four-valves per cylinder), petrol engine
- Displacement: 2.7 L (164.8 cu in); 3.2 L (195.3 cu in)
- Cylinder bore: 2.7 L: 81 mm (3.19 in); 3.2 L: 84 mm (3.31 in)
- Piston stroke: 65 mm (2.56 in) to 71.5 mm (2.81 in)
- Cylinder block material: Cast aluminium alloy
- Cylinder head material: Cast aluminium alloy
- Valvetrain: 32v DOHC (quad cam)
- Compression ratio: 2.7 L: 11.0:1; 3.2 L: 13.5:1

Combustion
- Fuel type: Petrol
- Oil system: Dry sump
- Cooling system: Water-cooled

Output
- Power output: 411–550 hp (306–410 kW)
- Torque output: 234–302 lb⋅ft (317–409 N⋅m)

Dimensions
- Length: 546 mm (21.5 in)
- Width: 513 mm (20.2 in)
- Height: 440 mm (17.3 in)
- Dry weight: 88–105 kg (194–231 lb)

RPE RP-V8 is the name of a naturally-aspirated V8 engine series developed by Radical Sportscars in Peterborough, England for use in the SR8 sportscar. The design is loosely based on the 1.3 litres (79.3 cu in) inline-four engine produced by Suzuki for their Hayabusa motorcycle. The company have designed their own cylinder block and use existing Suzuki cylinder heads. The two cylinder banks are inclined at 72-degree angle. Lubrication is provided by a dry sump system. The engine is mated to a purpose-built transaxle designed by Quaife.

There are currently two versions of the engine available, which have been updated for 2011. First is the base 2.7 litres (164.8 cu in) model which retains the original bore and stroke of the K8 Hayabusa design and produces 430 horsepower (321 kW; 436 PS). Second is the bored and stroked 3.2 litres (195.3 cu in) model which produces up to 500 horsepower (373 kW; 507 PS).

== Specifications ==
(from Radical Sportscars)

=== Engine ===
- maximum motive power: 430 to 550 brake horsepower (321 to 410 kW; 436 to 558 PS)
- maximum revs: 10,500 revolutions per minute
- steel flat-plane crankshaft
- Twin pump lubrication system
- Four scavenge pump dry sump system
- Rotary vane coolant pump
- Pre-engage starter motor
- Belt-driven 45 amp alternator
- 45 mm eight-throttle body induction system

=== Bellhousing and clutch ===
- Twin-plate dry clutch
- Integral oil tank capacity: 9 litres (2.0 imp gal; 2.4 US gal)
- Integral rear engine mount
- Engine - gearbox spacing: 126 millimetres (5.0 in)
- Dry weight: 13.7 kilograms (30 lb)

=== Transaxle ===
- Six-speed constant mesh manual transmission transaxle
- Sequential shift - 6 forward, 1 back
- Torque-biased limited-slip differential
- Integral oil cooling pump
- Pressure fed lubrication system

==== Dimensions ====
- Length: 546 millimetres (21.5 in)
- Width: 513 millimetres (20.2 in)
- Height: 440 millimetres (17.3 in)
- Dry weight: 88–105 kilograms (194–231 lb)
