= Racing Green Endurance =

SRZero
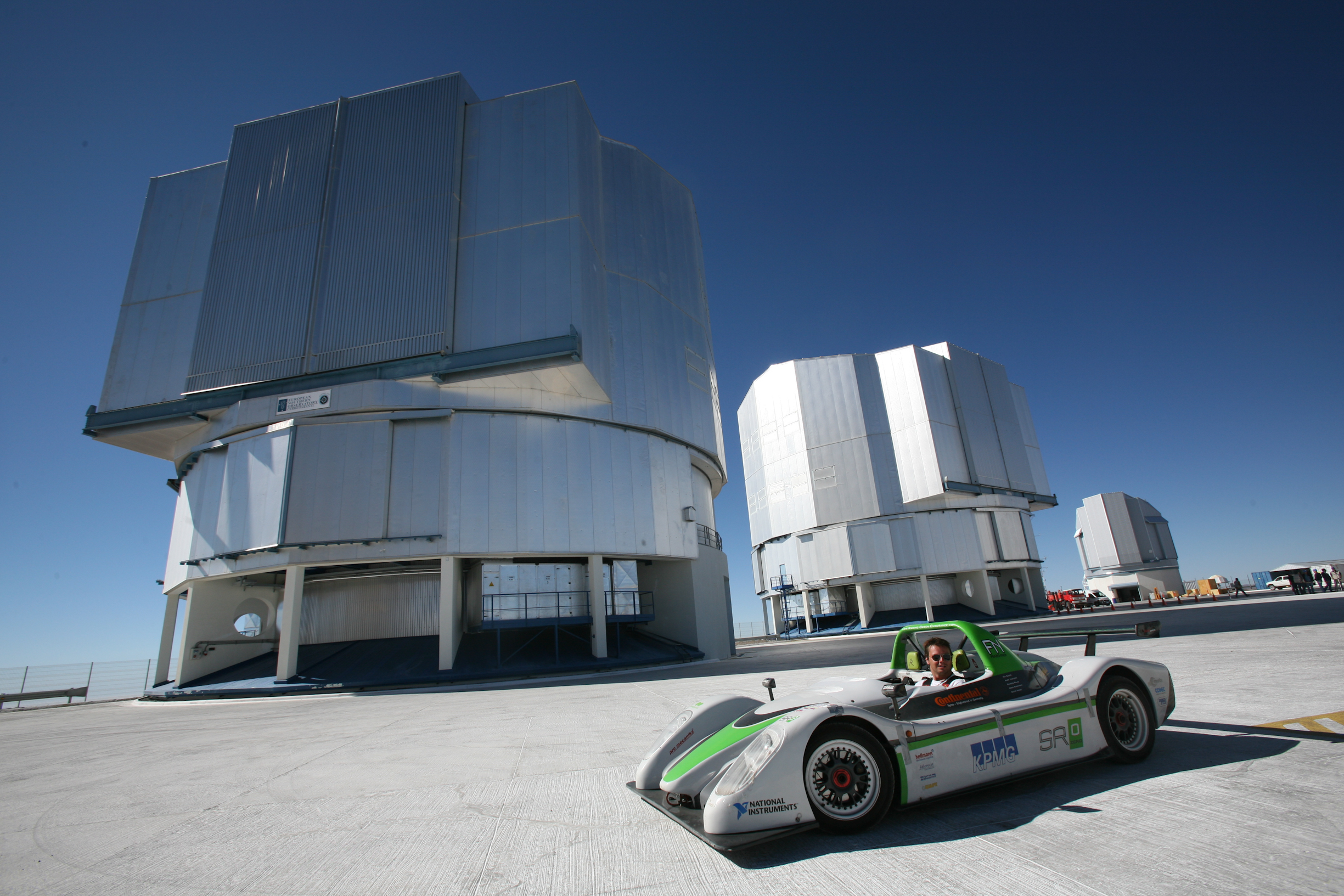

Overview
- Manufacturer: Racing Green Endurance
- Designer: Racing Green Endurance

Body and chassis
- Body style: 0-door roadster
- Layout: Rear mid-engine, Rear-wheel drive
- Platform: Unique, developed from Radical SR8

Powertrain
- Electric motor: two EVO Electric PM synchronous motors
- Power output: 565 brake horsepower (573 PS; 421 kW) @ 5,000 rpm 1,085 newton-metres (800 lbf⋅ft)
- Battery: 56 kW·h Li-ion battery
- Range: 400 kilometres (250 mi)

Dimensions
- Curb weight: 1,200 kg (2,600 lb)

Racing Green Endurance (RGE) was a student-led project at Imperial College London to demonstrate the potential of zero emission cars. The team drove 26,000 km down the Pan-American Highway starting from north Alaska in July 2010, this was filmed by the documentary maker Claudio Von Planta.

Racing Green Endurance was born as a spin-off from Imperial Racing Green in late 2008. Imperial Racing Green is an undergraduate teaching project to design and build fuel cell/electric hybrid racing cars, involving around 100 students from 8 departments within the university. The students are now designing and building the third generation of fuel cell powered racers.
