= Adelaide Street Circuit =

Temporary race track in Adelaide, South Australia

- Layout used by Supercars from 1999 until 2026

- Layout used by Formula One from 1985 to 1995 and the American Le Mans Series in 2000
- Location: Adelaide, South Australia
- Coordinates: 34°55′50″S 138°37′14″E
- FIA Grade: 3
- Owner: Adelaide City Council
- Opened: 31 October 1985; 41 years ago Re-opened in 8 April 1999; 27 years ago
- Closed: 12 November 1995; 30 years ago
- Former names: Adelaide Parklands Circuit
- Major events: Current: Supercars Championship; Adelaide Grand Final (1999–2020, 2022–present); Supercars Challenge (1985–1995); GT World Challenge Australia (2007–2013, 2015–2017, 2022–2023, 2026); Future: Grand Prix motorcycle racing Australian motorcycle Grand Prix (2027); Former: Formula One; Australian Grand Prix (1985–1995); American Le Mans Series; Race of a Thousand Years (2000); Stadium Super Trucks (2015–2018, 2020, 2024); S5000 (2023); S5000 Tasman Series (2022)

Supercars Circuit (1999–2026)
- Length: 3.219 km (2.000 mi)
- Turns: 14
- Race lap record: 1:16.0357 ( (Australia) Aaron Cameron, Rogers AF01/V8, 2023, S5000)

Formula One Grand Prix Circuit (1985–1995, 2000)
- Length: 3.780 km (2.349 mi)
- Turns: 16
- Race lap record: 1:15.381 ( (United Kingdom) Damon Hill, Williams FW15C, 1993, F1)

The Adelaide Street Circuit, also known as the Adelaide Parklands Circuit, is a motorsport street circuit within the East Parklands adjacent to the central business district of Adelaide, South Australia, Australia.

The 3.780 km (2.349 mi) "Grand Prix" version of the track hosted eleven Formula One Australian Grand Prix events from 1985 to 1995, as well as the Race of a Thousand Years American Le Mans Series race in 2000. Between 1999 and 2020 and again from 2022, a shortened 3.219 km (2.000 mi) version of the circuit has been used for the Adelaide 500 touring car race. It is also used by the Adelaide Motorsport Festival. A modified layout of the original track will be used for the Australian Motorcycle Grand Prix from 2027.

== Formula One ==
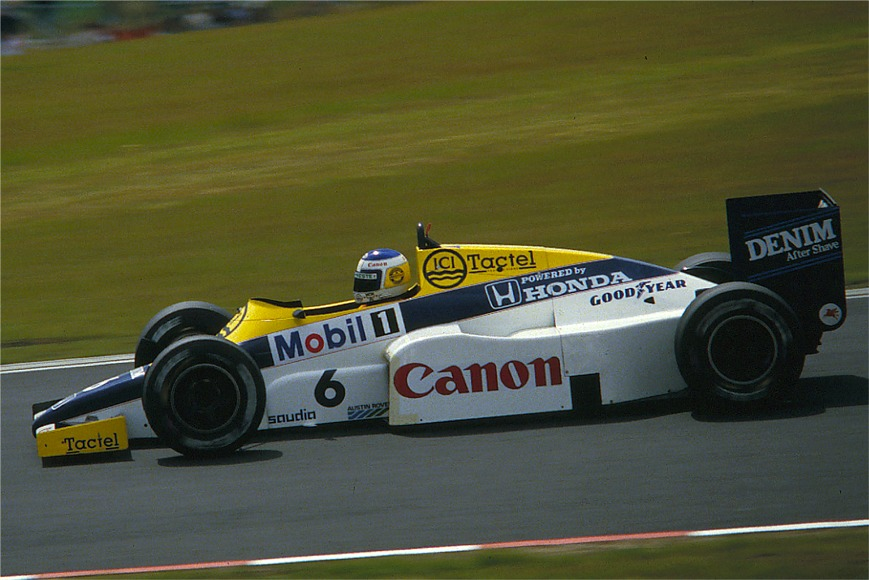
Keke Rosberg driving for Williams won the first Australian Formula One Grand Prix

Following Adelaide being awarded a round of the 1985 Formula One World Championship in October 1984, construction of the circuit by Macmahon Holdings. The first event was held in 1985 as the final event of the season. The last Formula One race at the circuit was held in 1995 after which the rights were lost to Melbourne and the event moved to the Albert Park Street Circuit.

== Supercars ==
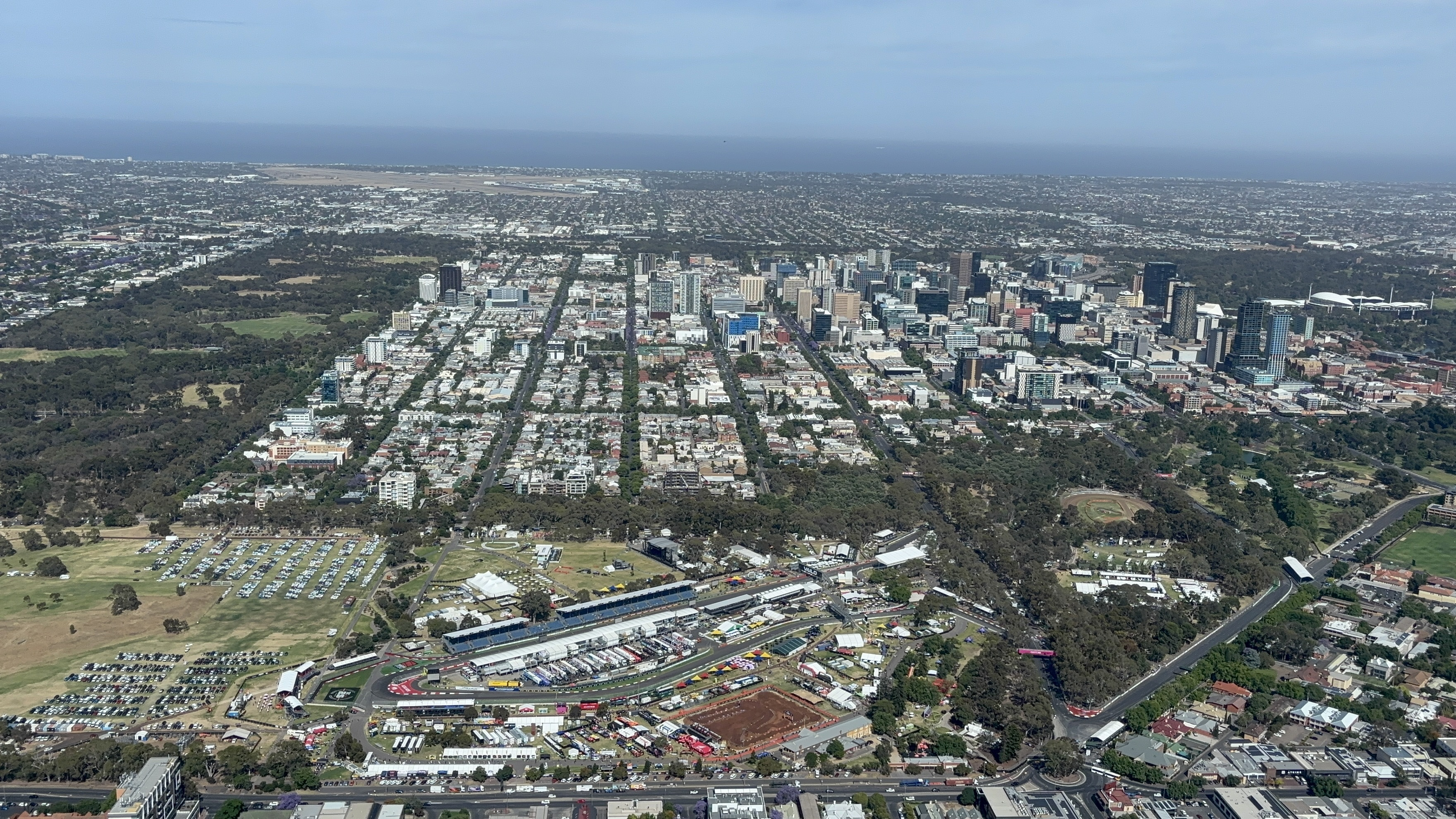
The street circuit as seen from a helicopter in November 2024

During Adelaide's era hosting the Australian Grand Prix, the circuit hosted annual non-championship races for the Group A and later Group 3A touring cars.

From 1999 until 2020, the track hosted the Adelaide 500 for Supercars, in most years a 2 x 250 km race) on a shorter, 3.219 km (2.000 mi) variant of the track. The event became one of the most acclaimed on the Supercars calendar, and is the only event added to the Supercars Hall of Fame. The event returned in 2022 but as the last event of the year, having previously usually been the opening event.

== MotoGP ==
Track map of the proposed MotoGP layout of the Adelaide Street Circuit

In 2027, a round of the MotoGP championship will be held when the Australian Motorcycle Grand Prix moves from Phillip Island. It will use a heavily modified version of the Formula One Circuit.

On 19 February 2026 Peter Malinauskas as Premier of South Australia, announced that an annual motorcycling carnival, the MotoGP, would take place in Adelaide's eastern Park Lands from late 2027. The Premier stated publicly that "about 45" trees would be destroyed, and that the century-old Glover East Playspace would need to be "moved" to make way for the motorcycle race track, but a later analysis by the Adelaide Parklands Association argued this significantly under-stated the likely impact.

As of August 2026 there has been much criticism of using the Adelaide street circuit (which would need to be expanded and modified to accommodate the differing needs of a motorcycle race, including the felling of up to 200 trees) by residents, councillors (including Adelaide Lord Mayor Jane Lomax-Smith), and others, who say that not enough consideration has been given to the environmental and social consequences of the decision, suggesting that the course could be moved to The Bend at Tailem Bend. Many are opposed to the removal of trees in the park lands which would be necessary for the street circuit. A letter led by the South East City Residents Association and signed by ecologists, historians, conservationists, various academics as well as residents was sent to FIM president Jorge Viegas, urging him to undergo an independent environmental impact assessment of the planned circuit before further engagement with the South Australian Government. Dorna Sports said on 8 August that the approved layout would be announced in coming weeks.

=== Small Copper Butterfly ===
The small copper butterfly was not observed on the Adelaide plains for 60 years before it was rediscovered in 2011 in Adelaide's Victoria Park after which the City of Adelaide set aside and carefully managed a biodiversity site in Pakapakanthi (Park 16). Most colonies on the Adelaide plains are very small and continue to be locally vulnerable. The proposed circuit is going to take 45% of the remnant grassland in Pakapakanthi and put this vulnerable colony of the chequered copper butterfly at risk of extinction.

== Circuit ==
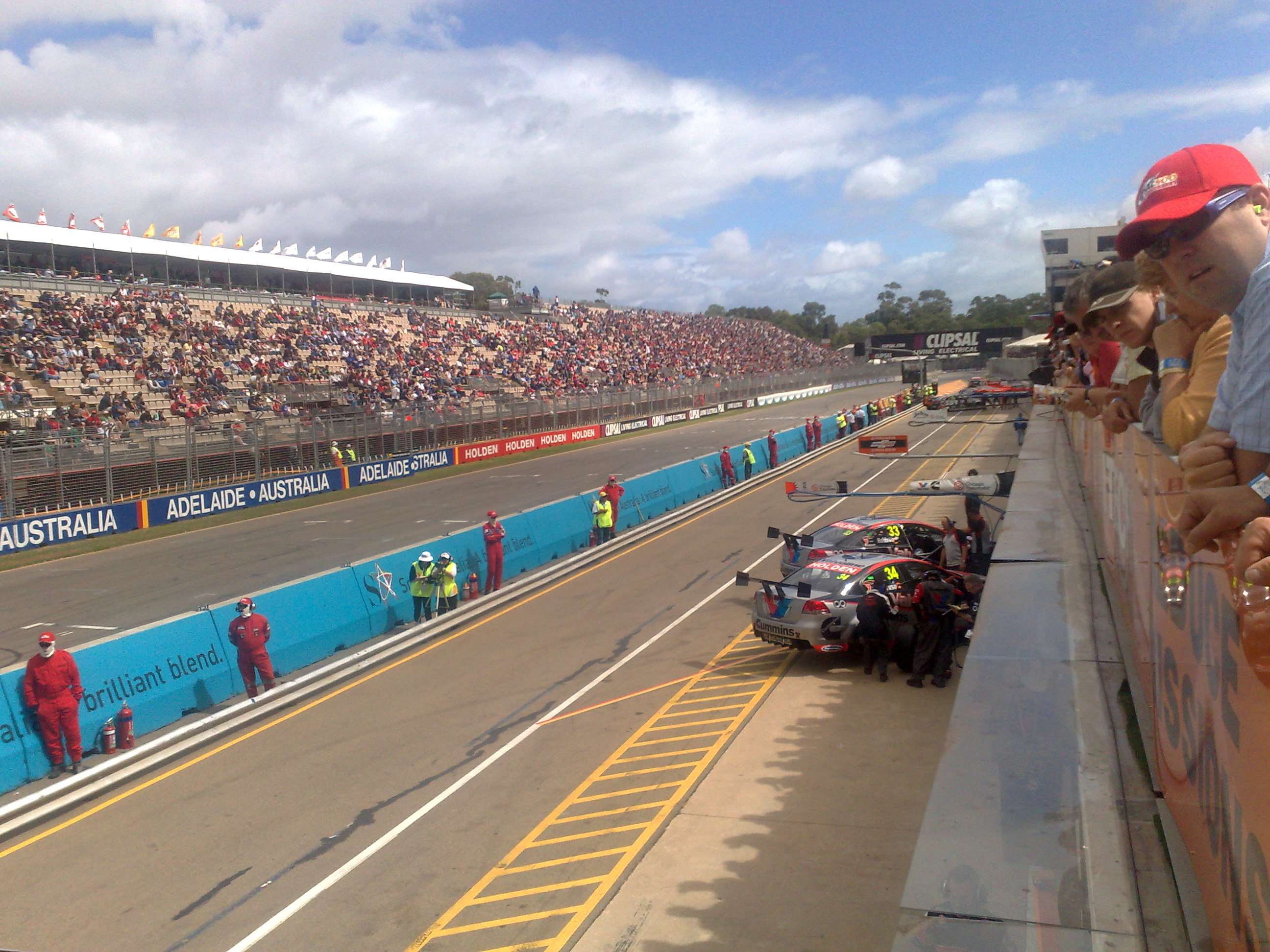
The view looking North down Victoria Park pit straight towards the Senna Chicane during Friday qualifying of the 2008 Adelaide 500

The Adelaide Street Circuit commences pit straight in Victoria Park. It is 500 m (550 yd) long and faces northwest. All the buildings and grandstands are temporary and were removed each year.

At the end of the straight, drivers negotiate the Senna Chicane, named after Ayrton Senna following his death at the 1994 San Marino Grand Prix. After the chicane the cars take a fast left turn to go uphill on a short straight on Wakefield Road to East Terrace before the first of three 90 degree corners. A fourth 90 degree followed onto Bartels Road back across the parklands. Then the track follows the fast turn 8 sweeper.

The full Grand Prix circuit bypasses the turn onto Bartels Road and continues with a sweeping left-right-right into Stag Turn (turn 9). This leads onto the 360 m (390 yd) long Rundle Road that was named after Alan Jones in 1987.

In 2017, the building and opening of the O-Bahn Busway access and tunnel running off of Grenfell Street and across the circuit where the sweeping left-right-right (turns 7, 8 and 9) were made it necessary to actually move turns 7 and 8 approximately 100 metres to the south. While not affecting the overall length of the full circuit, it would make the run from turn 6 shorter and the run to turn 9 longer. The sweeping bends were also known as Banana Bend due to its location adjacent to the Adelaide Fruit Markets.

Brewery Bend is a fast right-hand sweeper named after the Kent Town Brewery that opens onto Dequetteville Terrace.

The Dequetteville Terrace straight (named after Jack Brabham for Formula One and Peter Brock for the Adelaide 500) was a 900 m (980 yd) stretch where the over 1,000 bhp (746 kW; 1,014 PS) Formula One cars in the turbo era (1985–88) were reaching speeds in excess of 200 mph (320 km/h) making Adelaide easily the fastest street circuit of the time as the only others were the much tighter Monaco, Detroit and Phoenix circuits. The short form of the track rejoins Brabham Straight two-thirds of the way down, so the 640 m (700 yd) long Bartels Road straight is longest on that layout. In 2007 this section of track was renamed Brock Straight after touring car driver Peter Brock.

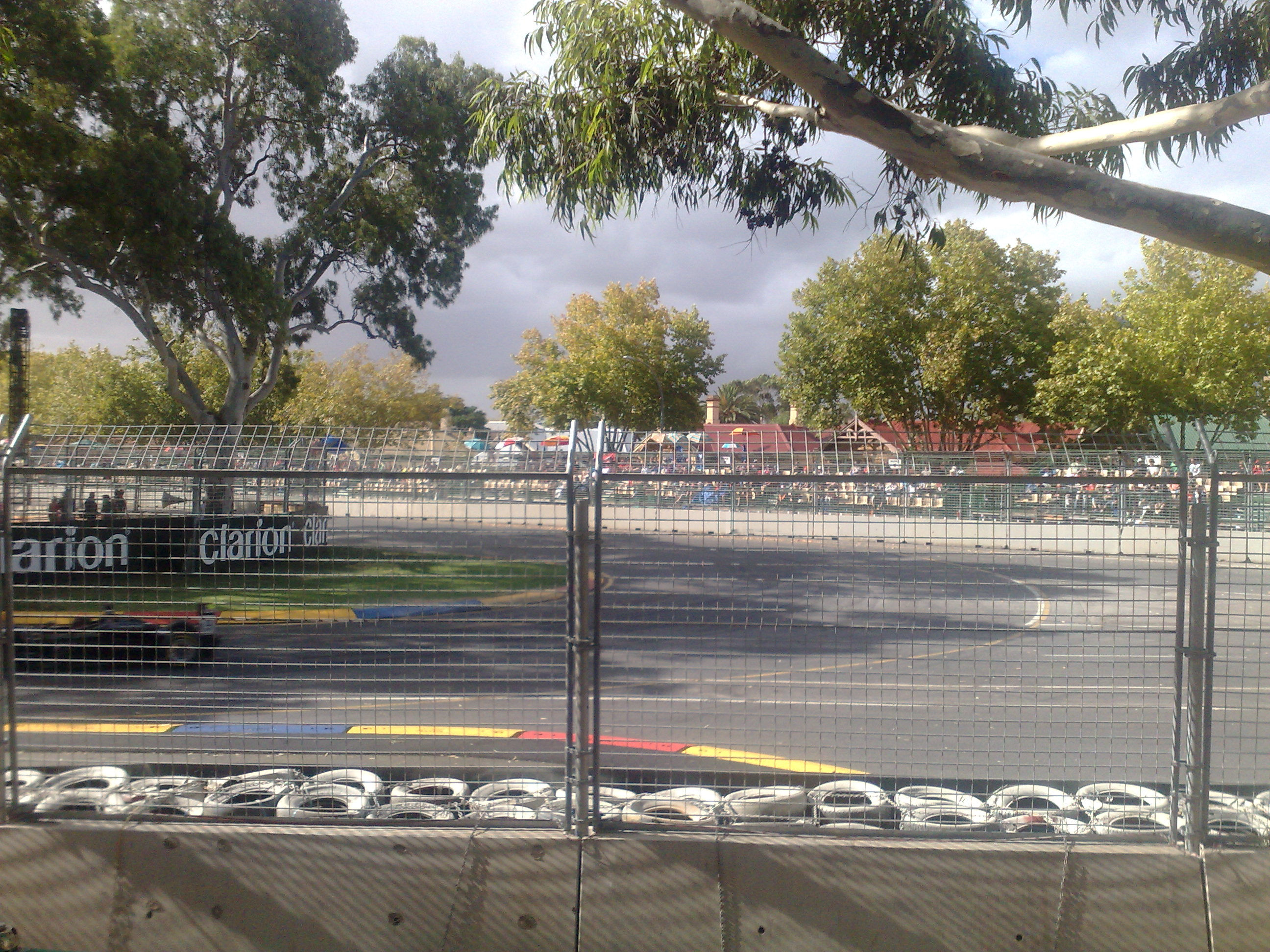
Hairpin corner at the end of the Dequetteville Terrace straight

At the end of Brabham Straight is a right hand hairpin turn (at the Britannia Roundabout) that directs the driver back onto Wakefield Road.

After accelerating out of the hairpin the driver faces a left turn and a long sweeping right-hand curve back into Victoria Park behind the pit area. The lap concludes with another right-hand hairpin (Racetrack Hairpin) onto the pit straight.

The track is essentially flat except for a small valley on the Brock Straight, and a slight incline on Jones Straight, while the run-up Wakefield Road from turns 3 to 4 also has a slight incline. All of these sections of the track run in an east–west direction. The elevation ranges from 36–53 m (118–174 ft).

During the Formula One and early V8 Supercar eras the Victoria Park Racecourse, a horse racing track, was located at the park, though has since been removed.

== Sprint Circuit ==
Between 2014 and 2018, an annual Adelaide Motorsport Festival ran on the Victoria Park Sprint Circuit, a shortened 1.4 km (0.87 mi) layout. The layout turned right along Wakefield Street after the Senna Chicane and then rejoined the main circuit for the final corners. The event had attracted older Formula One machinery, with Ivan Capelli holding the lap record in a March CG891. The event was returned on March 24–26, 2023; and was also held on March 15–17, 2024.

== Events ==
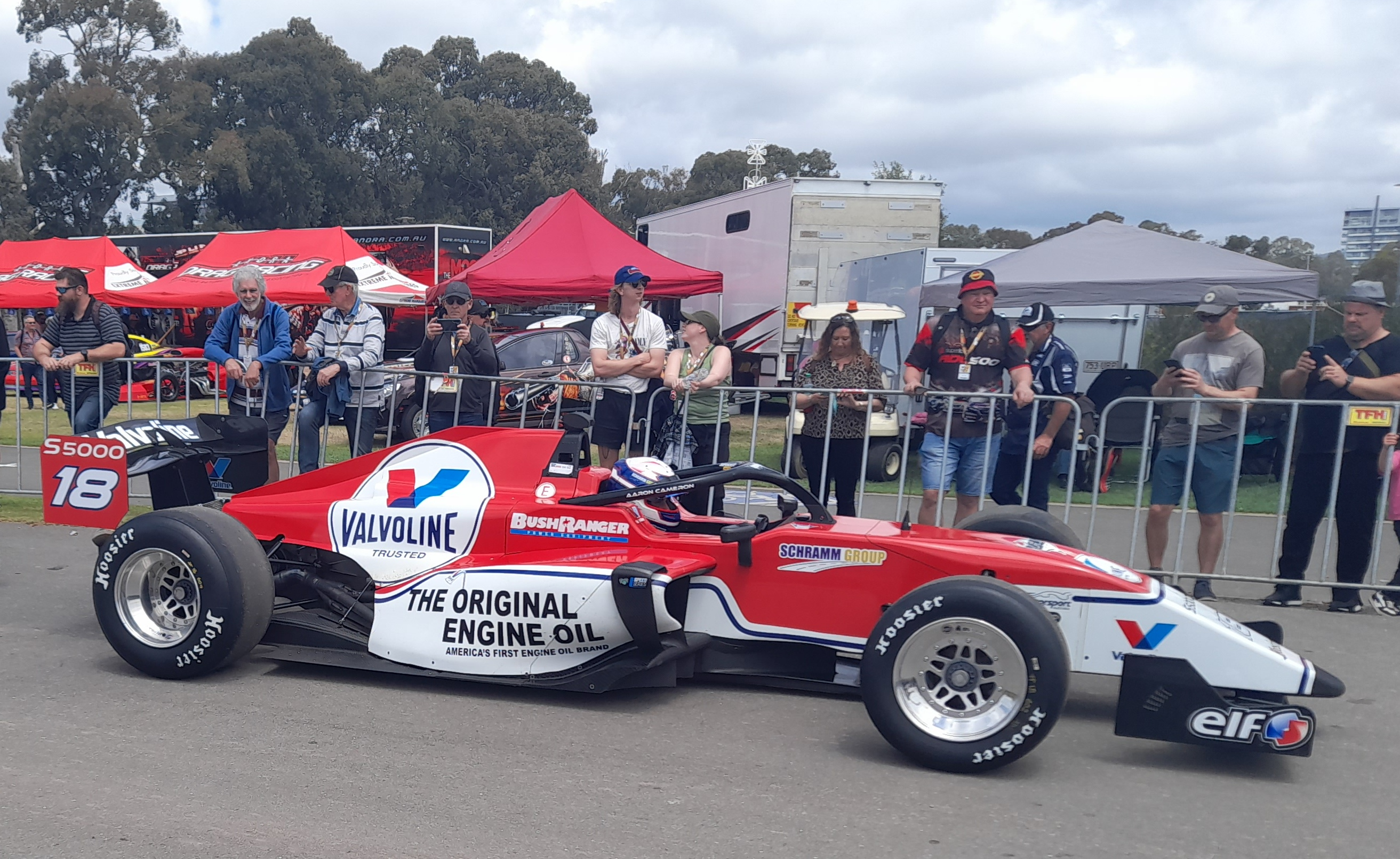
Aaron Cameron set the S5000 lap record for the Supercars Circuit on 24 November 2023

Current

- November: Supercars Championship Adelaide 500, GT World Challenge Australia, Porsche Carrera Cup Australia Championship, SuperUtes Series, Super2 Series

Future

- Grand Prix motorcycle racing
  - Australian motorcycle Grand Prix (2027)

Former

- American Le Mans Series
  - Race of a Thousand Years (2000)
- Audi R8 LMS Cup (2018–2019)
- Aussie Racing Cars (2004–2007, 2009–2014, 2016–2017, 2019, 2025)
- Australian Drivers' Championship (1987, 1990, 1999–2001)
- Australian Formula 3 Championship (2002–2004, 2008–2009, 2012, 2014)
- Australian Formula Ford Championship (1987, 2005–2007, 2011)
- Australian GT Production Car Championship (2000, 2002)
- Australian Mini Challenge (2010)
- Australian National Trans-Am Series (2020, 2024–2025)
- Australian Nations Cup Championship (2000–2004)
- Australian Performance Car Championship (2001–2005)
- Australian Production Car Championship (2003–2004)
- Formula One
  - Australian Grand Prix (1985–1995)
- S5000 Australian Drivers' Championship (2023)
- S5000 Tasman Series (2022)
- Sports Racer Series (2010)
- Stadium Super Trucks (2015–2018, 2020, 2024)
- Supercars Championship
  - Supercars Challenge (1985–1995)
- Touring Car Masters (2005–2012, 2014–2020, 2022–2023)
- V8 Ute Racing Series (2002–2016)

== Lap records ==
The fastest ever recorded lap of the original 3.780 km (2.349 mi) Grand Prix Circuit was 1:13.371 by triple World Champion Ayrton Senna driving a McLaren MP4/8 Ford during qualifying for the 1993 Australian Grand Prix. However, as this was in qualifying and not a race, it does not count as the lap record.

The fastest officially recorded lap of the 3.219 km (2.000 mi) Supercars circuit is 1:16.0357 set by Aaron Cameron on 24 November 2023 driving a Rogers AF01/V8 in 2023 S5000 Australian Drivers' Championship. As of November 2025, the fastest official race lap records at Adelaide Street Circuit are listed as:

Category	Time	Driver	Vehicle	Date
Supercars Circuit: 3.219 km (2.000 mi) (1999–2026)
S5000	1:16.0357	(Australia) Aaron Cameron	Rogers AF01/V8	24 November 2023
GT3	1:17.2337	(Australia) Matt Campbell	Porsche 911 (992 I) GT3 R	25 November 2023
Formula Three	1:17.9726	(Australia) Simon Hodge	Mygale M11	28 February 2014
Supercars Championship	1:19.7028	(Australia) Will Brown	Chevrolet Camaro ZL1	30 November 2025
Formula Holden	1:19.9556	(New Zealand) Simon Wills	Reynard 94D	8 April 2001
Porsche Carrera Cup	1:20.1441	(Australia) Bayley Hall	Porsche 911 (992 I) GT3 Cup	24 November 2023
Super2 Series	1:20.5121	(New Zealand) Ryan Wood	Holden ZB Commodore	25 November 2023
Super3 Series	1:21.6779	(Australia) Cameron McLeod	Nissan Altima L33	26 November 2023
GT1 (GTS)	1:23.1553	(Denmark) Allan Simonsen	Ferrari 550 Millennio	21 March 2004
Trans-Am Australia	1:23.2163	(Australia) Jordan Cox	Ford Mustang Trans Am	28 November 2025
Sports Racer	1:24.5335	(Australia) Josh Hunt	West WR1000 Kawasaki	13 March 2010
N-GT	1:24.851	(Denmark) Allan Simonsen	Ferrari 360 Modena GT	4 March 2007
GT4	1:25.7405	(Australia) Sam Brabham	Mercedes-AMG GT4	3 December 2022
Formula Ford	1:26.5441	(Australia) Cameron Waters	Mygale SJ010A	18 March 2011
Touring Car Masters	1:26.7998	(Australia) George Miedecke	Chevrolet Camaro RS	3 December 2022
Group 3E Series Production Cars	1:29.4477	(Australia) Ray Hislop	Ford Falcon BF	4 March 2018
Aussie Racing Cars	1:30.3504	(Australia) Kody Garland	Mustang-Yamaha	28 November 2025
Historic F1 (1966–1969)	1:30.960	(United States) Pete Lovely	Lotus 49B	8 April 2000
Production Cars	1:32.6755	(Australia) Chris Alajajian	Subaru Impreza WRX STi	19 March 2005
SuperUtes Series	1:33.6751	(Australia) Adam Marjoram	Isuzu D-Max	15 November 2024
V8 Ute Racing Series	1:35.3306	(Australia) Ryal Harris	Ford Falcon FG Ute	1 March 2015
Australian Mini Challenge	1:37.2144	(Australia) Paul Stokell	Mini John Cooper Works Challenge	12 March 2010
Group N Historic Touring Cars	1:37.6254	(Australia) Paul Stubber	Chevrolet Camaro SS (1969)	23 March 2003
Lotus Super Series	1:38.4984	(Australia) Dean Evans	Lotus Exige	26 March 2006
Australian Saloon Car Series	1:39.7741	(Australia) Bruce Heinrich	Ford Falcon EA	20 March 2003
Stadium Super Trucks	1:43.2613	(United States) Matthew Brabham	Stadium Super Truck	17 November 2024
Mirage Cup	1:43.5619	(Australia) Gavin Harvey	Mitsubishi Mirage	9 April 2000
Holden HQ	1:49.6988	(Australia) Philip Collier	Holden Kingswood HQ	10 April 1999
Grand Prix Circuit: 3.780 km (2.349 mi) (1985–1995, 2000)
Formula One	1:15.381	(United Kingdom) Damon Hill	Williams FW15C	7 November 1993
LMP900	1:25.2189	(Italy) Rinaldo Capello	Audi R8	31 December 2000
Formula Brabham	1:29.970	(Australia) Paul Stokell	Reynard 91D	12 November 1995
Formula Mondial	1:33.200	(United States) Ross Cheever (Note: Both drivers took the same lap time independently on different years.) (Australia) John Bowe	Ralt RT4; Ralt RT4	2 November 1985; 25 October 1986
GT1 (GTS)	1:35.5296	(Portugal) Ni Amorim	Chrysler Viper GTS-R	31 December 2000
Formula Two	1:35.900	(Australia) David Brabham	Ralt RT30 Volkswagen	15 November 1987
Sports Sedan	1:36.5959	(Australia) Kerry Baily	Nissan 300ZX Turbo	31 December 2000
ALMS GT	1:36.8501	(Germany) Dirk Müller	Porsche 911 (996) GT3-R	31 December 2000
Group 3A Touring Car	1:37.720	(Australia) John Bowe	Ford Falcon EF	12 November 1995
250cc Superkart	1:37.990	(Sweden) Stefan Rindeström	250cc Superkart	4 November 1989
Group A Touring Car	1:42.470	(Australia) Glenn Seton	Ford Sierra RS500	4 November 1990
Ferrari Challenge	1:43.2832	(Australia) Mark Noske	Ferrari 360 Challenge	31 December 2000
Formula Ford	1:44.020	(Australia) Jason Bright	Van Diemen RF95	11 November 1995
Group N Touring Cars	1:53.420	(Australia) Darren Edwards	Ford Mustang	11 November 1995
Group 3E Series Production Cars	2:02.140	(Australia) Kent Youlden	Ford Falcon EA	3 November 1990
Holden HQ	2:06.050	(Australia) Peter Holmes	Holden Kingswood HQ	11 November 1995

=== Sprint circuit ===
The fastest recorded lap of the 1.400 km (0.870 mi) Victoria Park Sprint circuit is 0:42.5753 set by Ivan Capelli on 2 December 2018 driving a March CG891 car from the 1989 Formula One season.

Category	Time	Driver	Vehicle	Date
Outright	0:42.5753	(Italy) Ivan Capelli	March CG891 Ilmor	2 December 2018
