= 2011 Sports Racer Series =

Seasons
- ← 2010 2012 →

The 2011 Sports Racer Series is the second running of the Sports Racer Series, an Australian motor racing series for small engined sports racing cars. The series began in 2010 but died after the second round at Wakefield Park due to lack of numbers. The 2011 season has a more compact four round series over three states.

The number of entries has been impacted as all of the 2010 series Radical-equipped drivers have left for their own series single-marque series, the Radical Australia Cup. As a result, only 14 drivers have appeared so far representing cars built by Minetti Sports Cars, Speads Racing Cars and Stohr Cars, as well as West Race Cars.

At the halfway mark of the series, Stohr driver Adam Proctor dominates the series having won all six races outright, as well as winning the small capacity Class One with a perfect 228 points. Proctor is the only non-West driver in Class One and he holds a 14-point lead over the leading West driver in the class, Mark Laucke. Jonathon Stoeckel sits in third place, 13 points further behind.

In Class Two, West WX10 driver Aaron Steer leads the points having won the Class Two division in the four races in which the larger Class Two cars have had finishers. Races two and three at Winton saw none of the four cars present finish either race. Steer leads Minetti driver Scott Bingham by 47 points. Steer and Bingham are the only drivers with more than one race finish for the season.

== Calendar ==
The 2011 Sports Racer Series will consist of four events.

Rd.	Circuit	Location	Date	Winner	
Rd.	Circuit	Location	Date	Class One	Class Two
1	Eastern Creek Raceway	Sydney	27–29 May	Adam Proctor	Aaron Steer
2	Morgan Park Raceway	Warwick, Queensland	24–26 June	Adam Proctor	Aaron Steer
3	Phillip Island Grand Prix Circuit	Cowes, Victoria	2–4 September	Adam Proctor	Aaron Steer
4	Wakefield Park	Goulburn, New South Wales	18–20 November	Adam Proctor	Josh Hunt

== Teams and drivers ==
The following teams and drivers have competed during the 2011 Sports Racer Series.

Team	No	Driver	Class	Model
Ultra Fast Karts	8	Warren Thompson	Class One	West WR1000 Kawasaki
West Race Cars Australia	9 & 19	Graeme Cook	Class One	West WR1000 Kawasaki
West Race Cars Australia	33	James Kovacic; Greg Steer; Michael Whiting	Class One	West WR1000 Kawasaki
West Race Cars Australia	66	Aaron Steer	Class Two	West WX10 Suzuki
Navybox School of Motorsport	32	Sue Hughes	Class Two	Radical SR3 Suzuki
SRS Racing	36	Geoff Rands	Class Two	Minetti SS-V2 Suzuki
AMAC Motorsport	51	Andrew Macpherson	Class One	West WR1000 Kawasaki
	52	Peter Mackie	Class One	West WR1000 Kawasaki
Bryan Stoeckel	53	Jonathon Stoeckel	Class One	West WR1000 Kawasaki
	55	Scott Bingham; Todd Phillips	Class Two	Minetti SS-V2 Suzuki
Laucke Flour	61	Mark Laucke	Class One	West WR1000 Kawasaki
Meridian Motorsport	77	Josh Hunt	Class Two	Speads RS08 Suzuki
	97	Bernie Ferguson	Class Two	West WX10 Suzuki
AP Racing	98	Adam Proctor	Class One	Stohr WF-1 Suzuki

=== Drivers' points ===
Points were are 38–35–33–32–31–30 etc. based on race positions in each race, in each class. Points based on official series website.
