= Sports Racer =

Sports Racer may refer to:

- Sports car racing, a form of circuit auto racing
- Sports Racer Series, an Australian motor racing series
