= 2010 Sports Racer Series =

Seasons
- ← none 2011 →

The 2010 Sports Racer Series is the inaugural running of the Sports Racer Series, an Australian motor racing series for small engined sports racing cars. The series began at the 2010 Clipsal 500 on 11 March and was scheduled to conclude at Eastern Creek Raceway on 24 October. A shortfall of entrants at the Phillip Island caused the cancellation of that event, and since then technical regulation clashes with the New South Wales series on which the remainder of the national series was to piggy-back, has seen no further events take place.

== Calendar ==
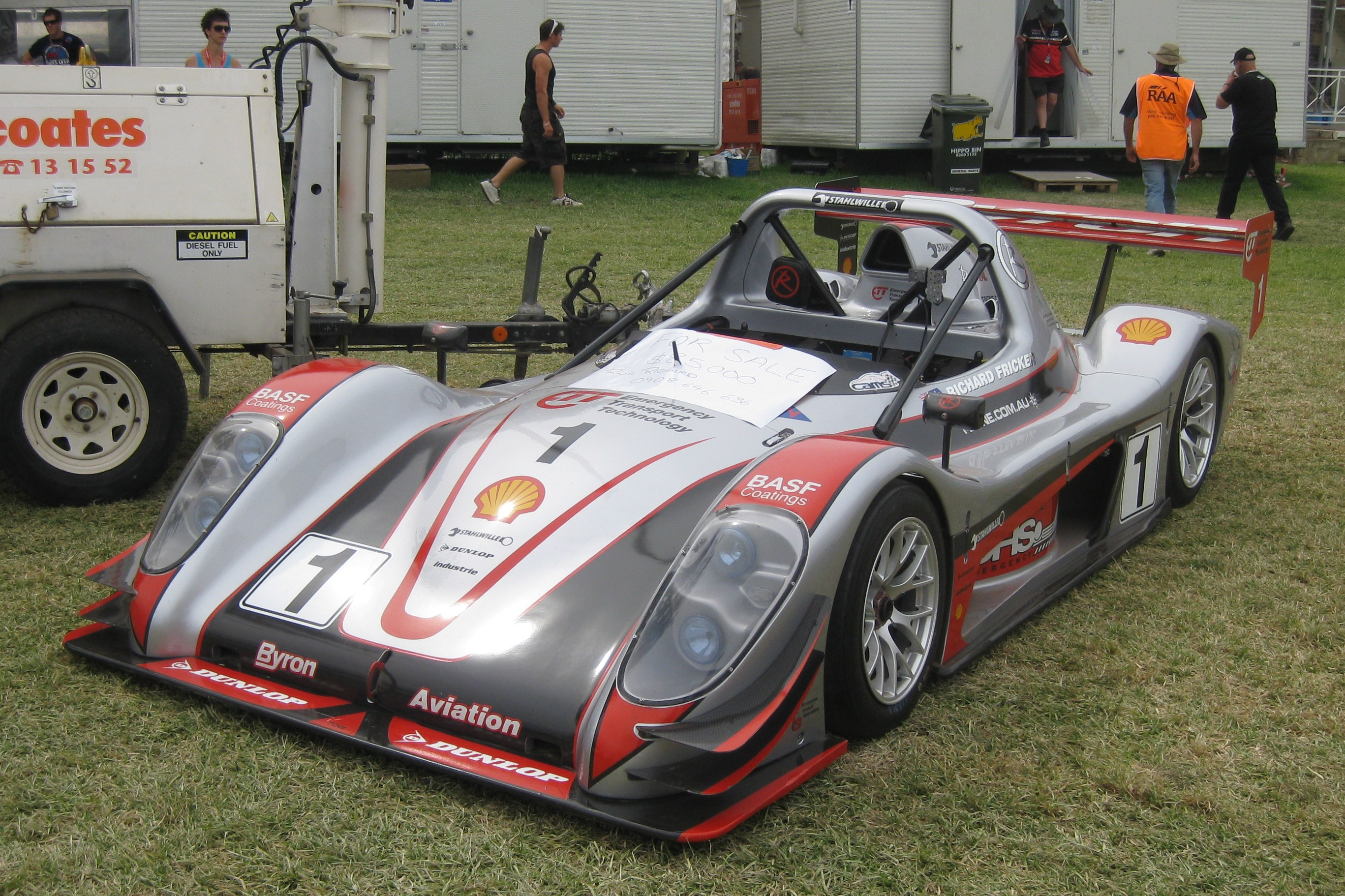
The Radical SR3 of Richard Fricker at Round 1

The 2010 Sports Racer Series will consist of six events:

Rd.	Circuit	Location	Date	Winner	
Rd.	Circuit	Location	Date	Class One	Class Two
1	Adelaide Street Circuit	Adelaide, South Australia	11–14 March	Josh Hunt	Steve Morcombe
2	Wakefield Park	Goulburn, New South Wales	10–11 April	Aaron Steer	Neil McFadyen
	Phillip Island Grand Prix Circuit	Cowes, Victoria	1–2 May	event cancelled	
	Eastern Creek Raceway	Sydney, New South Wales	19–20 June	event cancelled	
	Wakefield Park	Goulburn, New South Wales	28–29 August	event cancelled	
	Eastern Creek Raceway	Sydney, New South Wales	23–24 October	event cancelled	

== Teams and drivers ==
The following teams and drivers have competed during the 2010 Sports Racer Series.

Team	No	Driver	Class	Model
Richard Fricker Motorsport	1	Richard Fricker	Class Two	Radical SR3 Suzuki
West Race Cars Australia	4	Aaron Steer	Class Two	West WX10 Suzuki
West Race Cars Australia	9	Amanda Sparks	Class One	West WR1000 Kawasaki
West Race Cars Australia	33	Greg Keene	Class One	West WR1000 Kawasaki
West Race Cars Australia	53	John Hunt	Class One	West WR1000 Kawasaki
Morcraft Homes	12	Steve Morcombe	Class Two	Chiron LMP3-05 Toyota
Interior Developments	14	Glyn Edis	Class Two	Radical SR3 Suzuki
Radical Australia	19	Basil Mondello	Class Two	Radical SR3 Suzuki
MPA Projects	22	Edward Singleton	Class Two	Radical SR3 Suzuki
Tasker Joinery	29	Greg Tasker	Class Two	Radical SR3 Suzuki
Mitre 10	46	David Barram	Class One	ASP 340C6 Nissan
Imak/Kwikmit	51	Andrew Macpherson	Class One	West WR1000 Kawasaki
Key Produce	57	Richard Bloomfield	Class Two	Radical SR3 Suzuki
Laucke Flour	61	Mark Laucke	Class One	West WR1000 Kawasaki
Engineering Partners	71	George Davis	Class Two	ADR 3 Suzuki
Meridian Motorsport	77	Neil McFadyen	Class Two	Speads RS08 Suzuki

=== Drivers' points ===
Points were awarded 38-35-33-32-31-30 etc. based on race positions in each race, in each class. Points based on official series website.

Pos	Driver	Round 1 – ADE			Round 2 – WAK			Pts
Pos	Driver	Race 1	Race 2	Race 3	Race 1	Race 2	Race 3	Pts
Class One
1	Mark Laucke	4th	3rd	7th				206
2	Amanda Sparks	9th	9th	Ret				165
3	Andrew Macpherson	10th	11th	DNS				159
4	Josh Hunt	1st	1st	1st				114
4	Aaron Steer				1st	1st	1st	114
6	Greg Keene	8th	6th	6th				101
7	David Barram	11th	DNS	Ret				30
Class Two
1	Neil McFadyen	3rd	8th	3rd				210
2	Richard Bloomfield	7th	5th	5th				204
3	Steve Morcombe	2nd	2nd	2nd				114
4	Glyn Edis	5th	4th	4th				101
5	Basil Mondello	12th	10th	8th				91
6	George Davis	13th	12th	10th				87
7	Greg Tasker	14th	13th	9th				86
	Richard Fricker	6th	7th	DNS				0
	Aaron Steer	Ret	Ret	DNS				0
	Edward Singleton	DNS	DNS	DNS				0

Colour	Result
Gold	Winner
Silver	Second place
Bronze	Third place
Green	Points classification
Blue	Non-points classification
Blue	Non-classified finish (NC)
Purple	Retired, not classified (Ret)
Red	Did not qualify (DNQ)
Red	Did not pre-qualify (DNPQ)
Black	Disqualified (DSQ)
White	Did not start (DNS)
White	Withdrew (WD)
White	Race cancelled (C)
Blank	Did not practice (DNP)
Blank	Did not arrive (DNA)
Blank	Excluded (EX)
