= Race of a Thousand Years =

Endurance race

Adelaide Street Circuit

The 2000 Race of a Thousand Years was an endurance race and the final round of the 2000 American Le Mans Series. It was run on the Adelaide Street Circuit in Australia on New Year's Eve, 31 December 2000. The race was run on the full 3.780 km (2.349 mi) Grand Prix circuit used by Formula One for the Australian Grand Prix between 1985–1995, rather than the shorter 3.219 km (2.001 mi) Supercars version of the circuit used since 1999. The race was scheduled to run for six hours from 4pm to 10pm.

== Background ==
Like the 1999 Le Mans Fuji 1000 km, the Race of a Thousand Years was intended as a precursor to a planned Asia-Pacific Le Mans Series (APLMS) run by Don Panoz and the Professional Sports Car Racing body, just as the Silverstone and Nürburgring events earlier in the season were for the European Le Mans Series (ELMS). After a small number of entrants for the European series in 2001, as well as a lack of entrants for a third Asian-Pacific exhibition event at the Sepang Circuit, the APLMS plans were cancelled.

The race was the final of twelve endurance sports car racing rounds of the 2000 American Le Mans Series and took place at the Adelaide Street Circuit on 31 December 2000. The event was the first in a nine-year contract, but was abandoned after only one. Over 135,000 fans attended the race meeting, with almost 70,000 of them in attendance on race day, though race organisers had hoped for around 200,000 people in attendance during the race weekend.

== Race Summary ==
By completing the first 25 laps (and in the lead after having passed teammate Frank Biela on lap 17), Allan McNish became the 2000 American Le Mans Series LMP Drivers' Champion. McNish and teammate Rinaldo Capello completed 225 laps in their Audi Sport North America R8. Australian driver Brad Jones had also qualified the R8, and was on hand to help with the driver changes, but did not drive in the race. Jones, the team owner and lead driver of Audi's factory backed Super Touring race team in Australia, was on stand-by for Scotsman McNish who had injured his back a few days before the race while stepping out of his kilt after a photo shoot and had spent the day before the race flat on his back in bed in a successful effort to be fit to race. Only being a guest driver who'd never even driven the car until practice, Jones later admitted that despite arguably knowing the circuit better than anyone in the entire Audi team, his lap times were around 4 seconds slower per lap than both McNish and Capello so while it was disappointing, it was probably a good thing he didn't get to drive (part of the Brad's problem was that being taller and stockier than his would-be co-drivers, he actually struggled to fit in the R8). The Audi team suffered a setback on the morning of the race when Capello crashed the R8 (painted in crocodile livery in honour of the host country Australia) into the tyre barriers on the outside of turn six. However, despite not being able to recover all of the parts as some of them (including some of the body panels with the special crocodile paintwork) had actually been souvenired by some enterprising spectators, the team were able to repair the car well in time to allow McNish to take the start.

The GTS class was won by Olivier Beretta, Karl Wendlinger and Dominique Dupuy who piloted their Team Oreca Dodge Viper GTS-R (known as a Chrysler Viper in Australia) to 3rd outright, while finishing 5th outright were the GT class winners Dirk Müller and Lucas Luhr in their Dick Barbour Racing Porsche 911 GT3-R.

McNish (Audi), Portuguese driver Ni Amorim (Viper) and German Luhr (Porsche) set the fastest laps in their respective classes, with McNish's time of 1:25.2189 being the fastest ever non-Formula One race lap of the Adelaide circuit (compared to the outright lap record of 1:15.381 set by Damon Hill in a Williams FW15C powered by a Renault V10 engine during the 1993 Australian Grand Prix).

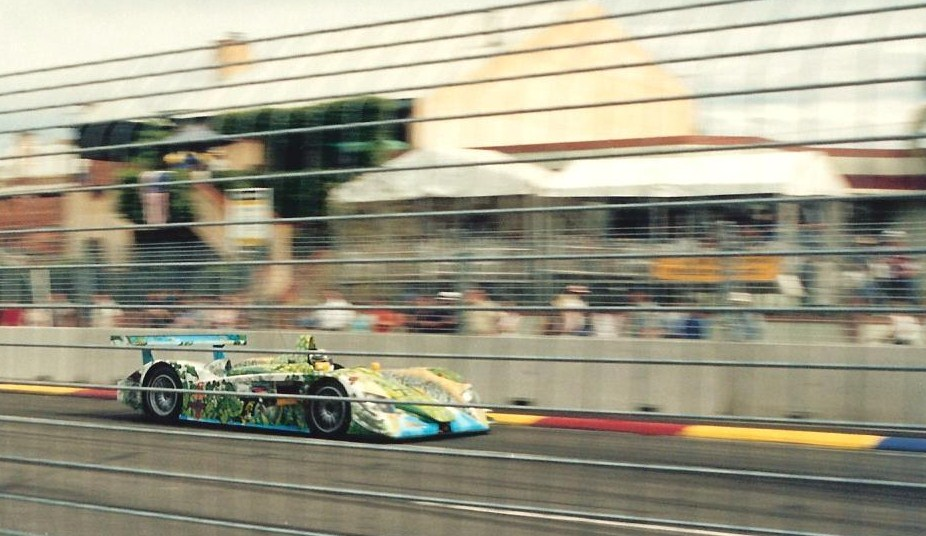
The winning Rinaldo Capello / Allan McNish crocodile liveried Audi R8 driven early in the race by McNish.

== Top 10 Qualifiers ==
Pos	No	Team	Driver	Car	Time	Gap
Pole	77	(Germany) Audi Sport North America	(Italy) Rinaldo Capello	Audi R8	1:23.8038	—
2	78	(Germany) Audi Sport North America	(Germany) Frank Biela	Audi R8	1:23.9783	0.1745
3	12	(United States) Panoz Motor Sports	(Australia) David Brabham	Panoz LMP-1 Roadster-S	1:24.9890	1.1852
4	2	(United States) Panoz Motor Sports	(United States) Johnny O'Connell	Panoz LMP-1 Roadster-S	1:25.1683	1.3645
5	1	(United States) Panoz Motor Sports	(Denmark) Jan Magnussen	Panoz LMP07	1:26.8596	3.0558
6	31	(France) Motorola DAMS	(France) Éric Bernard	Cadillac Northstar LMP	1:27.5513	3.7475
7	32	(France) Motorola DAMS	(France) Christophe Tinseau	Cadillac Northstar LMP	1:27.7513	3.9475
8	0	(Italy) Team Rafanelli SRL	(Italy) Domenico Schiattarella	Lola B2K/10	1:28.8167	5.0129
9	28	(Germany) Konrad Motorsport	(Austria) Franz Konrad	Lola B2K/10	1:32.9607	9.1569
10	91	(France) Viper Team Oreca	(Monaco) Olivier Beretta	Dodge Viper GTS-R	1:34.6027	10.7989

== Official results ==
Class winners in bold.

Pos	Class	No	Team	Drivers	Chassis	Tyre	Laps
Pos	Class	No	Team	Drivers	Engine	Tyre	Laps
1	**LMP**	**77**	**(Germany) Audi Sport North America**	**(Italy) Rinaldo Capello (United Kingdom) Allan McNish (Australia) Brad Jones**	**Audi R8**	MI	**225**
1	**LMP**	**77**	**(Germany) Audi Sport North America**	**(Italy) Rinaldo Capello (United Kingdom) Allan McNish (Australia) Brad Jones**	**Audi 3.6L Turbo V8**	MI	**225**
2	LMP	28	(Germany) Konrad Motorsport	(Austria) Franz Konrad (United States) Charles Slater (Australia) Alan Heath	Lola B2K/10	G	204
2	LMP	28	(Germany) Konrad Motorsport	(Austria) Franz Konrad (United States) Charles Slater (Australia) Alan Heath	Ford (Roush) 6.0L V8	G	204
3	**GTS**	**91**	**(France) Viper Team Oreca**	**(Monaco) Olivier Beretta (Austria) Karl Wendlinger (France) Dominique Dupuy**	**Dodge Viper GTS-R**	MI	**202**
3	**GTS**	**91**	**(France) Viper Team Oreca**	**(Monaco) Olivier Beretta (Austria) Karl Wendlinger (France) Dominique Dupuy**	**Chrysler 356-T6 8.0L V10**	MI	**202**
4	GTS	92	(France) Viper Team Oreca	(France) Jean-Philippe Belloc (Portugal) Ni Amorim	Dodge Viper GTS-R	MI	202
4	GTS	92	(France) Viper Team Oreca	(France) Jean-Philippe Belloc (Portugal) Ni Amorim	Chrysler 356-T6 8.0L V10	MI	202
5	**GT**	**5**	**(United States) Dick Barbour Racing**	**(Germany) Dirk Müller (Germany) Lucas Luhr**	**Porsche 911 GT3-R**	MI	**199**
5	**GT**	**5**	**(United States) Dick Barbour Racing**	**(Germany) Dirk Müller (Germany) Lucas Luhr**	**Porsche M96/77 3.6L Flat-6**	MI	**199**
6	GT	15	(United States) Dick Barbour Racing	(Mexico) Randy Wars (Canada) John Graham (Germany) Christian Menzel	Porsche 911 GT3-R	MI	191
6	GT	15	(United States) Dick Barbour Racing	(Mexico) Randy Wars (Canada) John Graham (Germany) Christian Menzel	Porsche M96/77 3.6L Flat-6	MI	191
7	GT	6	(United States) Prototype Technology Group (PTG)	(United States) Terry Borcheller (United States) Anthony Lazzaro	BMW M3	Y	190
7	GT	6	(United States) Prototype Technology Group (PTG)	(United States) Terry Borcheller (United States) Anthony Lazzaro	BMW M52 3.2L I6	Y	190
8	GTS	61	(United Kingdom) Chamberlain Motorsport	(Venezuela) Milka Duno (South Africa) Stephen Watson (Australia) Ray Lintott	Chrysler Viper GTS-R	MI	190
8	GTS	61	(United Kingdom) Chamberlain Motorsport	(Venezuela) Milka Duno (South Africa) Stephen Watson (Australia) Ray Lintott	Chrysler 356-T6 8.0L V10	MI	190
9	LMP	12	(United States) Panoz Motor Sports	(Australia) David Brabham (New Zealand) Greg Murphy (Australia) Jason Bright	Panoz LMP-1 Roadster-S	MI	190
9	LMP	12	(United States) Panoz Motor Sports	(Australia) David Brabham (New Zealand) Greg Murphy (Australia) Jason Bright	Élan 6L8 6.0L V8	MI	190
10	GT	10	(United States) Prototype Technology Group (PTG)	(United States) Brian Cunningham (United States) Bill Auberlen (Sweden) Niclas Jönsson	BMW M3	Y	190
10	GT	10	(United States) Prototype Technology Group (PTG)	(United States) Brian Cunningham (United States) Bill Auberlen (Sweden) Niclas Jönsson	BMW M52 3.2L I6	Y	190
11	GT	66	(United States) The Racer's Group	(United States) Robert Orcutt (Australia) Darren Palmer (Australia) Christian D'Agostin	Porsche 911 GT3-R	P	188
11	GT	66	(United States) The Racer's Group	(United States) Robert Orcutt (Australia) Darren Palmer (Australia) Christian D'Agostin	Porsche M96/77 3.6L Flat-6	P	188
12	GT	8	(Switzerland) Haberthur Racing	(France) Patrick Vuillaume (Austria) Manfred Jurasz (Spain) Francesc Gutiérrez	Porsche 911 GT3-R	D	187
12	GT	8	(Switzerland) Haberthur Racing	(France) Patrick Vuillaume (Austria) Manfred Jurasz (Spain) Francesc Gutiérrez	Porsche M96/77 3.6L Flat-6	D	187
13 DNF	LMP	0	(Italy) Team Rafanelli SRL	(Italy) Domenico Schiattarella (Belgium) Didier de Radigues (Germany) Norman Simon	Lola B2K/10	MI	183
13 DNF	LMP	0	(Italy) Team Rafanelli SRL	(Italy) Domenico Schiattarella (Belgium) Didier de Radigues (Germany) Norman Simon	Judd GV4 (Rafanelli) 4.0L V10	MI	183
14	GT	30	(United States) White Lightning Racing	(United States) Mike Fitzgerald (United States) Randy Pobst	Porsche 911 GT3-R	MI	178
14	GT	30	(United States) White Lightning Racing	(United States) Mike Fitzgerald (United States) Randy Pobst	Porsche M96/77 3.6L Flat-6	MI	178
15	LMP	78	(Germany) Audi Sport North America	(Germany) Frank Biela (Italy) Emanuele Pirro	Audi R8	MI	170
15	LMP	78	(Germany) Audi Sport North America	(Germany) Frank Biela (Italy) Emanuele Pirro	Audi 3.6L Turbo V8	MI	170
16	GT	70	(Australia) Skea Racing International	(United Kingdom) Johnny Mowlem (United Kingdom) Richard Dean	Porsche 911 GT3-R	P	164
16	GT	70	(Australia) Skea Racing International	(United Kingdom) Johnny Mowlem (United Kingdom) Richard Dean	Porsche M96/77 3.6L Flat-6	P	164
17	GT	51	(United States) Dick Barbour Racing	(Germany) Sascha Maassen (France) Bob Wollek	Porsche 911 GT3-R	MI	162
17	GT	51	(United States) Dick Barbour Racing	(Germany) Sascha Maassen (France) Bob Wollek	Porsche M96/77 3.6L Flat-6	MI	162
18 DNF	GT	69	(Canada) Kyser Racing	(Canada) Kye Wankum (United States) Joe Foster (Canada) Jeff Pabst	Porsche 911 GT3-R	P	159
18 DNF	GT	69	(Canada) Kyser Racing	(Canada) Kye Wankum (United States) Joe Foster (Canada) Jeff Pabst	Porsche M96/77 3.6L Flat-6	P	159
19 DNF	LMP	31	(France) Motorola DAMS	(France) Éric Bernard (France) Emmanuel Collard	Cadillac Northstar LMP	MI	72
19 DNF	LMP	31	(France) Motorola DAMS	(France) Éric Bernard (France) Emmanuel Collard	Cadillac Northstar 4.0L Turbo V8	MI	72
20 DNF	LMP	32	(France) Motorola DAMS	(France) Christophe Tinseau (Belgium) Marc Goossens	Cadillac Northstar LMP	MI	54
20 DNF	LMP	32	(France) Motorola DAMS	(France) Christophe Tinseau (Belgium) Marc Goossens	Cadillac Northstar 4.0L Turbo V8	MI	54
21 DNF	GT	71	(Australia) Skea Racing International	(United States) Doc Bundy (Australia) Rohan Skea (Australia) Des Wall	Porsche 911 GT3-R	P	53
21 DNF	GT	71	(Australia) Skea Racing International	(United States) Doc Bundy (Australia) Rohan Skea (Australia) Des Wall	Porsche M96/77 3.6L Flat-6	P	53
22 DNF	GT	7	(United States) Prototype Technology Group (PTG)	(Germany) Hans-Joachim Stuck (United States) Boris Said (United States) Johannes van Overbeek	BMW M3	Y	30
22 DNF	GT	7	(United States) Prototype Technology Group (PTG)	(Germany) Hans-Joachim Stuck (United States) Boris Said (United States) Johannes van Overbeek	BMW M52 3.2L I6	Y	30
23 DNF	GTS	37	(United States) Intersport Racing	(United States) Vic Rice (United States) Kevin Buckler	Porsche 911 GT2	D	19
23 DNF	GTS	37	(United States) Intersport Racing	(United States) Vic Rice (United States) Kevin Buckler	Porsche 3.8L Turbo Flat-6	D	19
24 DNF	LMP	1	(United States) Panoz Motor Sports	(Denmark) Jan Magnussen (Germany) Klaus Graf	Panoz LMP07	MI	2
24 DNF	LMP	1	(United States) Panoz Motor Sports	(Denmark) Jan Magnussen (Germany) Klaus Graf	Élan (Zytek) 4.0L V8	MI	2
DSQ^{†}	LMP	2	(United States) Panoz Motor Sports	(Japan) Hiroki Katoh (United States) Johnny O'Connell (Germany) Klaus Graf	Panoz LMP-1 Roadster-S	MI	187
DSQ^{†}	LMP	2	(United States) Panoz Motor Sports	(Japan) Hiroki Katoh (United States) Johnny O'Connell (Germany) Klaus Graf	Élan 6L8 6.0L V8	MI	187

† – No. 2 Panoz was disqualified for allowing an unassigned driver, Klaus Graf, to drive the car during the race.

== Statistics ==
- Pole Position – Rinaldo Capello – No. 77 Audi Sport North America – 1:23.804
- Fastest Lap – Allan McNish – No. 77 Audi Sport North America – 1:25.219
- Average Speed – 148.048 km/h

American Le Mans Series
Previous race: 2000 Grand Prix of Las Vegas	2000 season	Next race: 2001 Grand Prix of Texas; 2001 season
