= Australian Prototype Series =

Australian motor racing series

- Category: Sports Car Racing
- Country: Australia
- Inaugural season: 2010
- Tyre suppliers: Hankook
- Drivers' champion: David Barram
- Official website: prototypeseries.com.au

The Australian Prototype Series is an Australian motor racing series for competitors smaller-engined (under 3.0 litres of engine capacity) prototype sports cars. Originally known as Sports Racer Series, eligibility is something of a polyglot collection of existing racing cars and racing categories, featuring Group 2C Supersport racing cars, which in itself is an amalgamation of the former Clubman Sports 1300 regulations with some newer motorcycle engined cars built specifically for Supersports, and a group of Category 6 sports cars produced by West, Minetti, Radical, Lincspeed and ADR, many of which formerly raced as Prototype Sports Cars, or Protosports. Drawing from so many different sources, entry was diverse. The first race meeting for the new category was held at the 2010 Clipsal 500 V8 Supercar race meeting. By 2011 the majority of the grid were American style SCCA DSR class Wests.

After two events, the third round of the series was cancelled and no further events appear likely to take place. The series stumbled heavily in its first season. Radical drivers left the series and established their own championship, Radical Australia Cup in 2011. A more modest series was held in 2011. Wests made up the bulk of the field.

Later, Formula 1000 open wheel cars were added to eligibility. International Group CN sports cars followed in 2017 when the series was re-branded and LMP3 was announced for 2019 but this was later delayed until 2020 and since delayed indefinitely as the COVID-19 pandemic affected pro-am motorsport in Australia. The 2025 series is being contested at five circuits.

== Classes ==
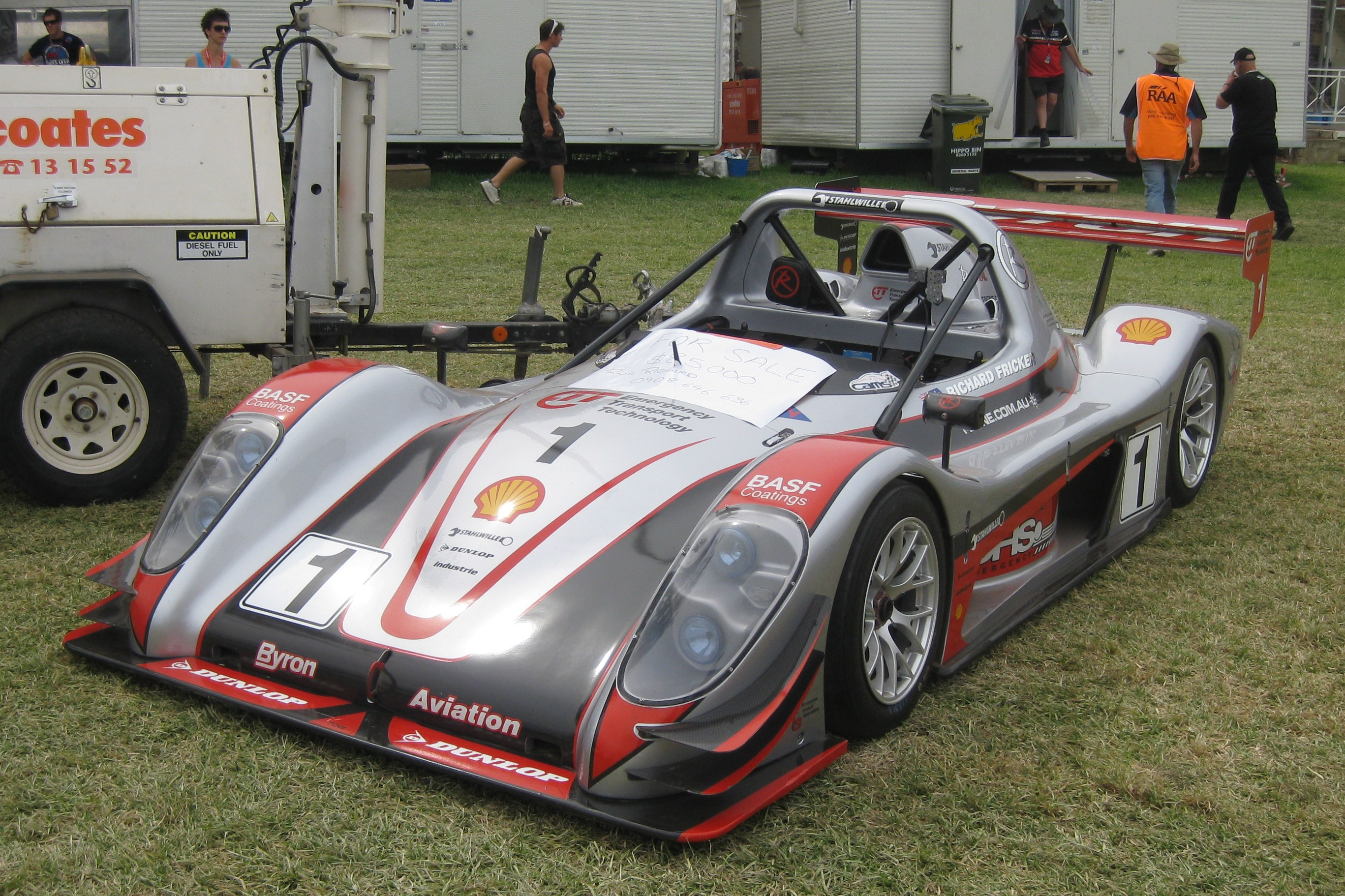
The Radical SR3 of Richard Fricker at the Adelaide Parklands circuit for the opening round of the 2010 Sports Racer Series.

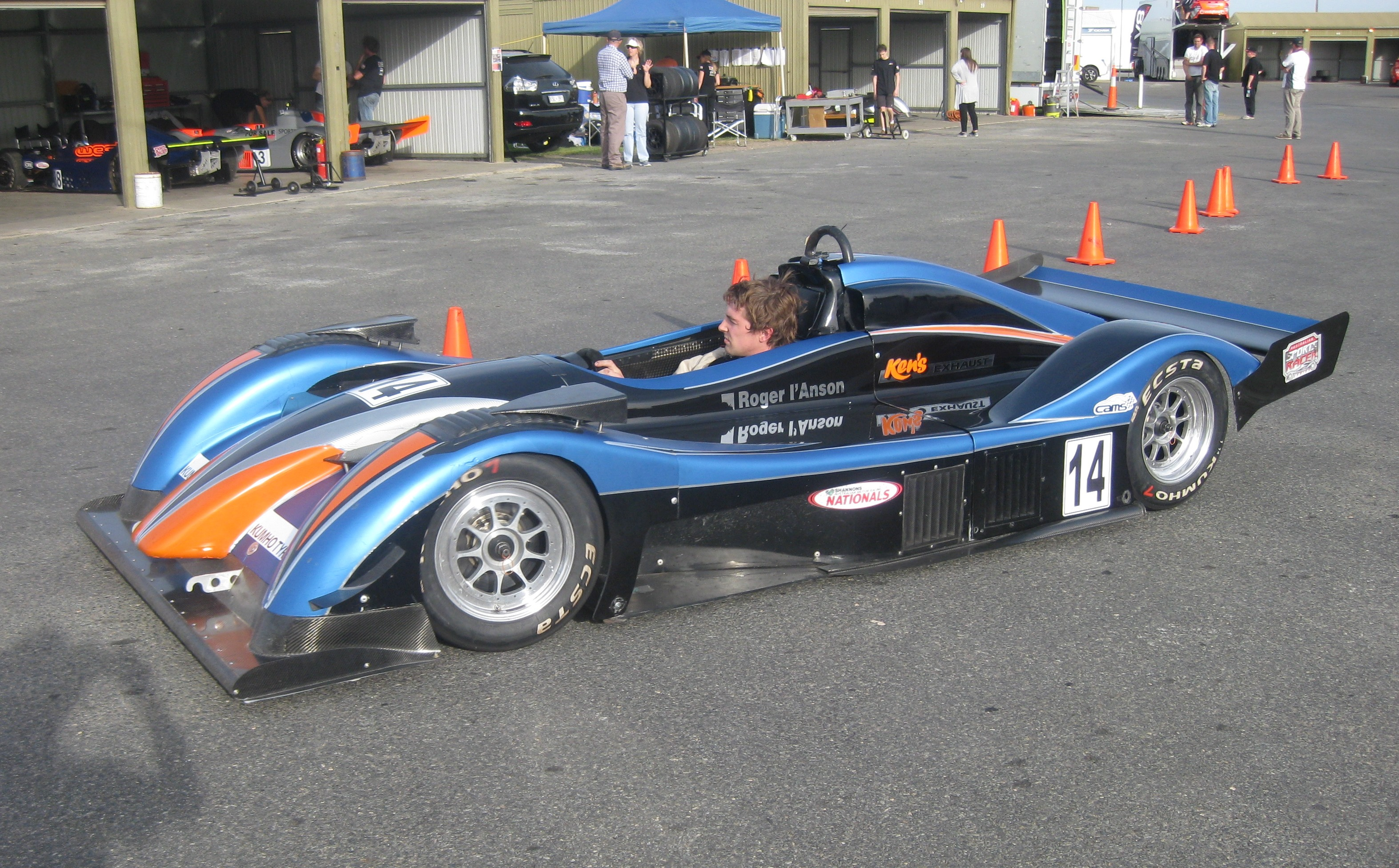
The West WR1000 of Roger I'Anson at the opening round of the 2014 Australian Sports Racer Series at Mallala Motor Sport Park.

The field will be split into two classes based on vehicle configuration and engine specification.

=== Class One ===
- Two seater cars. Automobile sourced engine up to 1320cc capacity (matches Sports 1300 regulations).
- Two seater cars. Motorcycle sourced engine up to 1200cc capacity (close to matches original Supersports regulations).
- Single-seater cars. Engine up to 1000cc capacity.
- Cars include: ASP 340C, Stohr WF-1 and West WR1000. Mostly powered by 1000cc Kawasaki engines.

=== Class Two ===
- Two seater cars. Automobile sourced engine 1321-1600cc capacity.
- Two seater cars. Motorcycle sourced engine 1201-1500cc capacity.
- Single-seater cars. Engine 1001-1340cc capacity.
- Cars include: ADR 3, Chiron LMP3-05, Minetti SS-V2, Radical SR3, Speads RS08 and West WX10. Most common engine is 1340cc Suzuki.

Performance parity will be adjusted for each individual vehicle throughout the series. Weights, and maximum engine revolutions will be adjusted if deemed necessary throughout the series. Additional weight will be added to the car in the form of success ballast, increasing the weights of cars finishing in the top three positions in each race over the course of an event. Additionally, a seeded drivers list will be drawn up by Motorsport Australia based on past racing history and drivers on that list will have added additional weight.

== Champions ==
Year	Overall Champion	
2013	Adam Proctor	Stohr WF-1 Suzuki
2014	Adam Proctor	Stohr WF-1 Suzuki
2015	Mark Laucke	West WR1000 Kawasaki
2016	Roger I'Anson	West WR1000 Kawasaki
2017	Mark Laucke	West WX10 Kawasaki
2018	Jason Makris	Wolf GB08 Honda
2019	David Barram	Chiron LMP3 Honda

Year	Class One		Class Two	
Year	Driver	Car	Driver	Car
2010	Mark Laucke	West WR1000 Kawasaki	Neil McFadyen	Speads RS08 Suzuki
2011	Adam Proctor	Stohr WF-1 Suzuki	Aaron Steer	West WX10 Suzuki
2012	Adam Proctor	Stohr WF-1 Suzuki	Aaron Steer	West WX10 Suzuki
2013	Adam Proctor	Stohr WF-1 Suzuki	not contested	
2014	Adam Proctor	Stohr WF-1 Suzuki	not contested	
2015	Mark Laucke	West WR1000 Kawasaki	Adam Cranston	RFR F1000 Kawasaki
