= Supersports =

- Category: Sports racing car
- Country: Australia
- Inaugural season: 1979 (Sports 1300); 2002 (Supersports)
- Drivers' champion: Stephen Morcombe (Interstate Challenge)
- Official website: Supersports Website

Supersports is an Australian motor racing class designed as a relatively cheap class of sports racing car. While looking like international sports cars the vehicles themselves are smaller and lighter. Engines are liquid-cooled, four stroke, naturally aspirated engines. They can be sourced from motorcycles with a limit of 1100 cubic centimetres, or from cars with a limit of 1630 cubic centimetres. Cockpit dimensions must have space for two seats.

The category superseded the previous small sports car category, Clubman Sports 1300 (which was limited to 1300cc car engined vehicles) in 2003. The increasing popularity internationally of motorcycle powered small sports cars like those built by Radical and others brought on the change, which also sought to modernise the category. The requirement for a two-seat cockpit has seen several, mostly American sports cars, like those built by West Race Cars excluded from Supersports.

Supersports raced competitively at state level in New South Wales, racing with state level Australian Formula 2 cars, as well as cars appearing in most eastern states. Up until 2010 the most prominent title for the class was the Supersports Interstate Challenge, a title first awarded to the Sports 1300 class in 1979. The most recent title was won by Stephen Morcombe driving a Chiron.

In 2010 a new national series began for Supersports and invited cars (to allow single-seat sports cars such as West designs) was created called the Sports Racer Series. The series however collapsed after only two rounds. The series is being revived for 2011, but will clash directly with the one-make Radical Australia Cup, the former New South Wales series expanding to a national series for the first time.
