= Adelaide Motorsport Festival =

Motorsport event in South Australia

The Adelaide Motorsport Festival is an annual motorsport event first held in 2014 using a shortened [1.6 km (0.87 mi)] version of the former Australian Grand Prix (held in Adelaide from 1985 to 1995) and Adelaide 500 race track within Victoria Park / Pakapakanthi, in the south-eastern parklands of the South Australian capital of Adelaide. The event has attracted the likes of Valtteri Bottas, Mika Häkkinen, David Coulthard, Damon Hill, Guenther Steiner, Liam Lawson, David Croft, Ivan Capelli, Stefan Johansson, Pierluigi Martini, David Brabham, Craig Lowndes, Marcos Ambrose, Jamie Whincup, Hayden Paddon, Mad Mike and more, with categories at the event including Formula 1, V8 Supercars, Hypercars, Heritage Touring Cars, Drift Cars, Motorbikes and more, taking to the track in demonstration runs.

== History ==
The Adelaide Motorsport Festival was created by the Sporting Car Club of SA with Tim Possingham engaged to deliver the event and was run by the club from 2014 until 2018.

The Adelaide Motorsport Festival is held the week before the Australian Grand Prix. Using the section of the track within Victoria Park / Pakapakanthi, which includes the Pit Straight and Senna Chicane, a section of Wakefield Road was used to create a 1.6km circuit. The surrounding parklands contains the pit paddock area, vehicle displays, catering, and VIP areas operated by car manufacturers like Ferrari, Audi, BMW, Aston Martin and Porsche.

The inaugural event, hosted in 2014, attracted a small crowd of about 1,800 spectators, growing within excess of 50,000 spectators by 2024.

The event did not run from 2019 to 2021 due to state government funding cuts. At this time, the club sold the event to Tim Possingham, an entrepreneur and motorsport competitor of some 40 years. In the run up to the 2022 South Australian state election, opposition leader Peter Malinauskas announced that the Adelaide Motorsport Festival and the Adelaide 500 would be revived if he was elected as state premier.

After winning the 2022 state election, Malinauskas announced the Adelaide Motorsport Festival would return with the 2023 edition running in March. The 2026 event was held on the weekend of February 28 and March 1, with the event traditionally held the week before the Australian Grand Prix in Melbourne.

== Event ==
The Adelaide Motorsport Festival consists of demonstration track events and displays of modern, collectable, historic and vintage cars in Victoria Park along with the Gouger Street Party.

=== Gouger Street Party ===
The Adelaide Motorsport Festival begins with the annual Gouger Street Party on the Friday night of the event. The free community event begins with the Peak Hour of Power – a parade that is typically composed of exotic and rare vehicles, running from Victoria Park through the city to Gouger Street to mark the beginning of the event. Typically featuring more than 20 common appearances of the Adelaide Motorsport Festival, the Peak Hour of Power closes roads for the parade. Spectators typically look at the cars, typically featuring a DJ, professional racing driver appearances, etc.

=== Victoria Park Sprint ===
On Saturday and Sunday, the Victoria Park Sprint takes place at Victoria Park. Multiple categories of vehicles take part in the demonstration runs, ranging from classic Formula 1 cars, V8 Supercars, touring cars, sportscars, rally cars, motorbikes, electric cars, etc. Each category races on track for 10 minutes, with cars being released between 30-second intervals in a super sprint format. There are also multiple demonstrations over the course of the event, such as at the 2018 rendition, where drag races took place between three different cars, each racing against a Red Bull Air Race aircraft.

=== Displays ===
The Adelaide Motorsport Festival combine on-track racing with more tranquil "picnic races" off-track. There are hundreds of cars on displays from various manufacturers, car clubs and more. Spectators can get up close to the cars and roam the paddock area, getting up close to classic Formula 1 cars, touring cars and more.

=== Grand Marquee ===
The Adelaide Motorsport Festival's Grand Marquee is the area where spectators are able to meet the star drivers of the event, see and hear about the latest motoring products and technology with talks from leading industry figures, and more. Located in the heart of the precinct in Victoria Park, access into the Grand Marquee is included with an Adelaide Motorsport Festival ticket.

=== Villas ===
The corporate villas at the Adelaide Motorsport Festival feature premium trackside seating, gourmet catering, and more bar facilities, from car dealers and manufacturers such as Aston Martin, Audi, BMW, Mercedes-Benz, Zagame Automotive and more.

== Notable cars and drivers ==
=== Drivers ===
Star drivers who have attended the Adelaide Motorsport Festival include:

- Valtteri Bottas, who drove the 2016 Bathurst 1000-winning Holden VF Commodore and an Alfa Romeo GTV Group A touring car at the 2023 Adelaide Motorsport Festival.
- Mika Häkkinen, the 1998 and 1999 Formula 1 world champion, who returned to the scene of his life-threatening accident at the 1995 Australian Grand Prix in Adelaide and drove a McLaren Solus GT at the 2026 Adelaide Motorsport Festival.
- David Coulthard, a winner of the Australian Grand Prix in Melbourne, who drove a McLaren Senna GTR at the 2026 Adelaide Motorsport Festival.
- Damon Hill, the last winner of the Australian Grand Prix in Adelaide in 1995 and Formula 1 world champion in 1996, who drove his first Formula 1 car, the Brabham BT60, at the 2025 Adelaide Motorsport Festival.
- Liam Lawson, who drove a Rodin FZED, Porsche 962 and Ford SuperVan 4.2 at the 2024 Adelaide Motorsport Festival.
- Stefan Johansson, who raced at the Australian Grand Prix in Adelaide between 1985 and 1989 and returned to drive the Ferrari 156/85 he raced in 1985.
- Alister McRae, a former World Rally Championship rally driver and brother of world champion Colin McRae, driving an original 1993 Subaru Impreza at the event in 2018, a sister car to the one driven by his brother.
- Alan Jones, 1980 Formula 1 world champion who drove in the Australian Grand Prix in 1985 and 1986, taking part in the 2019 Adelaide Rally in a McLaren 720S.
- David Brabham, Le Mans 24 Hour winner, three-time International Sports Car series champion, Australian Driver's Champion, British Formula 3 champion and two-time starter at the Australian Grand Prix, appearing in 2018, driving the Brabham BT62 as part of its public debut, and in the Brabham BT19 alongside son Sam Brabham.
- Pierluigi Martini, who raced in Adelaide between 1985 and 1994, featuring in 2017 driving his Minardi M 189 Formula One car, which raced at the Grand Prix in Adelaide in 1989.
- Ivan Capelli, who raced in Adelaide between 1985 and 1990, attended the event in 2016 and 2018 driving a Leyton House CG891 March Formula One car, which he had driven at the 1989 Australian Grand Prix. The Italian Formula One podium finisher set a lap record with the CG891 on the Adelaide Motorsport Festival track in 2018.
- Hayden Paddon, World Rally Championship winner, who drove his Hyundai Kona EV Rally car at the Adelaide Motorsport Festival.

A number of Australian touring car and V8 Supercars drivers have taken part in the Adelaide Motorsport Festival, including:

- Marcos Ambrose, Jamie Whincup, Greg Murphy, Steven Richards, Craig Lowndes, Jim Richards, John Bowe, Cam Waters, Nick Percat, Todd Hazelwood, Jonathon Webb, Thomas Randle, Tim Slade and more.

=== Cars ===
Formula 1 cars and other open wheelers, CanAm and Le Mans cars, World Rally Championship cars and various types of Australian touring cars and track-only Hypercars have appeared at the Adelaide Motorsport Festival. They include:

- Brabham BT19 - Sir Jack Brabham's 1966 Formula 1 championship winning Brabham BT19, demonstrated at the Adelaide Motorsport Festival by David Brabham and Sam Brabham.
- Benetton B190 - The Benetton B190, when won the 1990 Australian Grand Prix in Adelaide, returning to the same circuit 34 years later at the 2024 Adelaide Motorsport Festival.
- Mazda 767B - An IMSA-GTP prototype, powered by a quad-rotor 2.6-liter rotary engine, which raced at Le Mans and other sportscar events, appearing at the 2024 Adelaide Motorsport Festival.
- Ferrari 156/85 - The two Scuderia Ferrari cars that raced in the 1985 Formula 1 season and first Australian Grand Prix in Adelaide in 1985, with former driver Stefan Johansson returning behind the wheel of the car at the Adelaide Motorsport Festival.
- Lotus 97T Renault - The 1985 Lotus that Ayrton Senna drove at the 1985 Australian Grand Prix, which returned to Adelaide at the Adelaide Motorsport Festival.
- Lotus 99T Honda - The 1987 Lotus that Ayrton Senna drove at the 1987 Australian Grand Prix, which joined the Lotus 97T at the Adelaide Motorsport Festival.
- Leyton House CG891 - Ivan Capelli raced this car in the Australian Grand Prix in Adelaide in 1989 and drove the car again at the Adelaide Motorsport Festival in 2016 and 2018.
- Brabham BT60B Judd - The final Brabham Grand Prix car, which having failed to make it to the Australian Grand Prix in 1992, made its first appearance at the 2023 Adelaide Motorsport Festival.
- Brabham BT58 Judd- The last Brabham Grand Prix car to score a Formula One podium in 1989, with two BT58s on track at the 2023 Adelaide Motorsport Festival.
- Arrows A21 - Mark Webber was a test driver for Arrows when this car was being developed in 2000. It was notable for being a full-carbon car, including the tub, wishbones, brakes and even the gearbox casing.
- Cooper T51 - The T51 made its F1 debut at Monaco in 1959 with Sir Jack Brabham winning the race. This is the car Sir Jack famously pushed over the line to finish fourth at Sebring after leading most of the race and giving him the points to win his first driver's championship.
- 555 Prodrive Subaru -The 1993 Subaru Impreza 555 is chassis #4 from that year's World Rally Championship campaign, and is the only one from that year still with its original shell. A sister car to the one driven by the legendary WRC champion Colin McRae, it was campaigned by Markku Alén and Ari Vatanen in 1993 before winning the 1994 Asia Pacific Rally Championship with New Zealander Possum Bourne at the wheel. This was also Subaru's very first Impreza 555 Group A Manufacturer's and Driver's Championship double.
- Brabham BT62 - Adelaide's own supercar, the Brabham BT62 first surfaced early in 2018, but it had not been seen at speed in public until the Adelaide Motorsport Festival later that year. With a 5.4-litre mid-mounted V8 making 700 hp and a kerb weight of just 972 kg, the car was notably quick.
- Lotus 12 - The first Lotus to have ever raced in Formula One and Graham Hill's first Grand Prix race. Hill campaigned this Lotus 12 in Formula 2 in Europe in 1957, before it was entered in the Monaco GP in 1958. It also raced in the Dutch and Belgian GPs that year.
- Aston Martin Valkyrie AMR Pro - A track-only iteration of the Valkyrie, featuring a V12 engine.
- McLaren Solus GT - A closed-cockpit track car powered by a naturally aspirated Judd V10 engine.
- McLaren Senna GTR - The extreme, track-only version of the McLaren Senna.
- Pagani Huayra R Evo Roadster - An open-top, naturally aspirated V12-powered track car that made its Australian debut at the Adelaide Motorsport Festival.
- Pagani Huayra R and Pagani Zonda R - The track-only Paganis feature a naturally aspirated Mercedes-Benz AMG V12 engine and appeared at the 2025 Adelaide Motorsport Festival.
- Bugatti Bolide - The ultra-rare, track-only Bugatti hypercar made its Australian debut at the Adelaide Motorsport Festival.

== Adelaide Motorsport Festival films ==
Adelaide Motorsport Festival gained international attention in 2017 with its first promotional film. The following films have been produced:

- Race to the City was filmed on the streets of Adelaide and featured three Formula 1 cars, a Holden Dealer Team Torana A9X, and a World Superbike-spec Ducati ridden by three-time world champion Troy Bayliss. Drivers included multi-Bathurst 1000 winner John Bowe and V8 Supercar drivers Cameron Waters and Tim Slade. Cyclist Stuart O'Grady had a cameo role. The film was produced with a budget of under $25,000.
- Race to the City 2018 was produced with a bulk of footage having been shot in and around Adelaide, with some scenes filmed at the Autodromo Internazionale Enzo e Dino Ferrari in Italy with Formula One drivers Pierluigi Martini and Ivan Capelli. Other drivers featured were World Rally Championship driver Alister McRae, multiple Bathurst winner Craig Lowndes, Le Mans winner and Formula 1 driver David Brabham and Supercar driver Tim Slade. Cars in this film included the Leyton House CG891 March driven by Capelli in 1989, the Brabham BT62, LaFerrari and a Mitsubishi Lancer Evolution rally car.

== Recognition, attendance, impact ==
The Adelaide Motorsport Festival has seen an increase in attendance since its debut in 2014, with 38,913 in attendance in 2026. Highlights of the 2026 Adelaide Motorsport Festival can be viewed here.
