= Scott Tucker (businessman) =

American convicted felon and race car driver (born 1962)

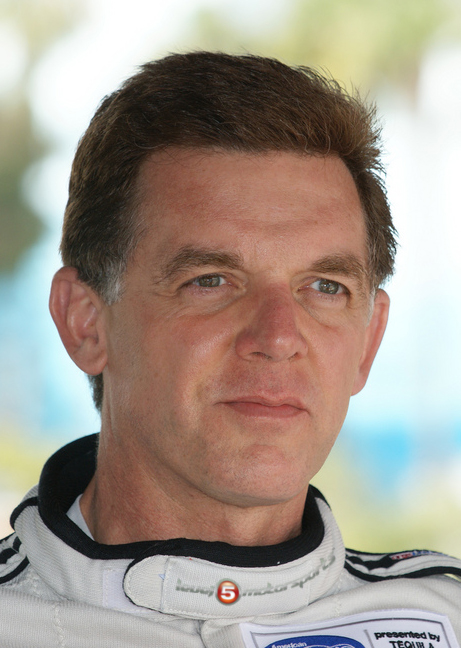
- Tucker in 2010
- Born: May 5, 1962 (age 64); Kansas City, Missouri, U.S.
- Status: Incarcerated
- Convictions: mail fraud, making false statements to a bank (1991); racketeering, wire fraud, money laundering, Truth In Lending Act violation (2017)
- Penalty: 1 year (1991); 16 years, 8 months (2017)

Details
- Imprisoned at: Leavenworth 1991–1992, FCI Yazoo City 2018–

Scott Tucker
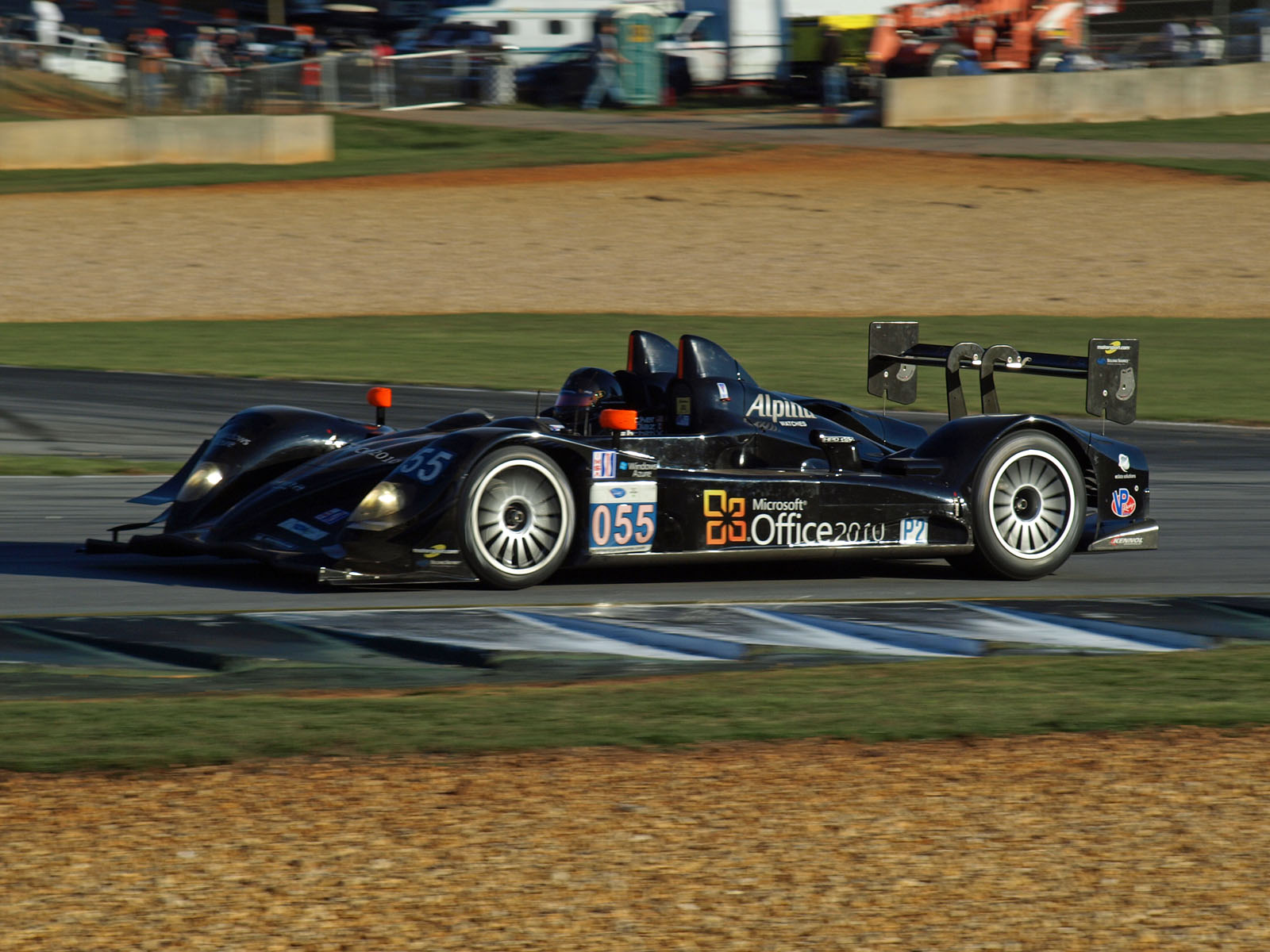
- Tucker at Petit Le Mans in 2011
- Categorisation: FIA Silver (until 2017); FIA Bronze (2018–)
- Years active: 2006–2014
- Car number: 055, 95
- Former teams: Kolles, Kelly Moss Motorsports, Hope Financial Racing, Level 5 Motorsports
- Championships: 2010 ALMS LMPC 2011-2013 ALMS LMP2
- Wins: 101

Previous series
- United SportsCar Championship, IMSA Lites, GT3 Cup, SCCA, American Le Mans Series, Intercontinental Le Mans Cup, KONI Challenge Series,
24 Hours of Le Mans career
- Years: 2010 – 2013
- Teams: Kolles; Level 5 Motorsports
- Best finish: 10th (2011)
- Class wins: 0

Scott Tucker (born May 5, 1962) is an American convicted racketeer, loan shark, fraudster and money launderer who used his illegal funds to finance – and drive for – his own sports car endurance racing team.

In 1991, Tucker was convicted for his illegal activities, including mail fraud, associated with a bogus lending company he operated, Chase, Morgan, Stearns & Lloyd, which he falsely claimed was associated with each of the four major banks whose names he included in the name of the company. He served one year in prison.

In 2001, Tucker founded an online business, AMG Services, that made payday loans even in states where these high-interest, low-principal loans were restricted or illegal. The business, which generated over $3.5 billion in revenue from just 2008 to June 2013, ultimately made loans to at least 4.5 million Americans. When state regulators tried to shut down his operations, Tucker made deals with Native American tribes to claim ownership of his business and invoke sovereign immunity from state courts. In February 2016, Tucker was arrested and indicted on federal criminal charges filed in the United States District Court for the Southern District of New York in relation to his ownership and controlling role in various payday lending operations that were found to have charged illegal interest rates in violation of RICO and TILA statutes. Tucker was convicted of making illegal payday loans and of racketeering in October 2017; he is currently serving a sentence of 16 years and 8 months in federal prison.

Tucker began his racing career in 2006, most notably competing in the American Le Mans Series and United SportsCar Championship for his Level 5 Motorsports.

== Racketeering, business and payday loans ==
In 1991, Tucker was convicted of three felony charges, including mail fraud and making false statements to a bank. One of the charges stemmed from a bogus lending company Tucker ran called Chase, Morgan, Stearns & Lloyd that charged businesses advanced fees for loans that were never delivered. He was imprisoned for a year at Leavenworth federal prison.

Tucker was CEO of AMG Services, a payday loan company that was found to charge undisclosed and inflated fees and used tribal entities in an attempt to violate state lending laws.

In April 2012, the Federal Trade Commission filed a civil suit against AMG Services, Scott Tucker and others alleging that AMG engaged in illegal business tactics. In May 2014, a U.S. grand jury subpoenaed AMG Services as part of a criminal probe conducted by the office of Manhattan U.S. Attorney Preet Bharara, reportedly looking at possible violations of statutes covering wire fraud, money laundering and racketeering.

In September 2016, a federal district judge ordered Tucker and other defendants to pay a record judgment of $1.266 billion for "deceiving consumers across the country and illegally charging them undisclosed and inflated fees". Tucker was also banned from the consumer-lending business. In January 2015, AMG Services and MNE Services Inc. agreed to settle charges with the Federal Trade Commission by paying a $21 million fine as well as waiving an additional $285 million in charges that were assessed but not collected.

In February 2016, Tucker was indicted and arrested for various criminal violations under RICO and TILA statutes for acts related to his involvement in a number of payday lending operations. On October 13, 2017, Tucker was convicted of 14 counts, including making illegal payday loans and racketeering.

Tucker was indicted in December 2017 for filing a false tax return. The US Attorney for Kansas alleges that Tucker created a sham sale of his payday loan business to the Miami Indian tribe of Oklahoma for $120,000 while he continued to control the business. The indictment alleges Tucker failed to report more than $117.5 million in income in 2009 and 2010. Tucker's tax accountant was also indicted.

Tucker is estimated to have earned $380 million from his payday loan organization, which exploited Native American sovereign immunity laws as a loophole through which to offer payday loans in states in which they are illegal. Operating under names including Ameriloan, Cash Advance, One Click Cash, United Cash Loans and 500 FastCash, Tucker's organization employed about 600 people and made loans with terms that included renewals and fees as well as interest rates as high as 700% per year. The majority of these loans were issued to low-income individuals.

Blaine and Joel Tucker, his brothers, were also involved in payday lending and faced criminal charges for their activities. Blaine Tucker committed suicide in 2014, while Joel Tucker received a $4 million civil penalty from the Federal Trade Commission for selling fake payday loan portfolios to debt collectors. In July 2020, Joel agreed to plead guilty to interstate transportation of stolen money, bankruptcy fraud and tax evasion. He faced possible sentences of five and ten years on the three charges after the agreement.

Scott Tucker's organizations ceased operation after he and his lawyer Timothy Muir were indicted in federal court in Manhattan. They were convicted on 14 counts of wire fraud, racketeering, money laundering and Truth In Lending Act offenses on October 13, 2017.

In September 2018, the Federal Trade Commission began issuing almost 1.2 million checks totaling more than $505 million to victims of Tucker's payday lending scheme. The money comes from a $1.3 billion civil court judgment the FTC obtained against Tucker and his AMG Services Inc. However, on petition to the United States Supreme Court in AMG Capital Management, LLC v. FTC, the Court ruled unanimously in April 2021 that the FTC did not have the authority under Congress to seek equitable relief and reversed the Ninth Circuit's decision.

Tucker pleaded guilty to one count of tax fraud in November 2021 in connection with forms filed for his racing entity, Level 5 Motorsports. Pursuant to a plea agreement, Judge Julie Robinson sentenced him to 36 months prison, served concurrently with his federal fraud conviction, and to pay $40 million in restitution to the IRS.

Tucker is serving a sentence of 16 years, 8 months and his lawyer Tim Muir is serving a sentence of 7 years. Tucker is scheduled for release from prison on March 4, 2032.

== Racing career ==
Tucker used money from his illegally operated payday lending business to fund his exploits as an amateur race car driver and team owner.

=== Rolex Sports Car Series ===
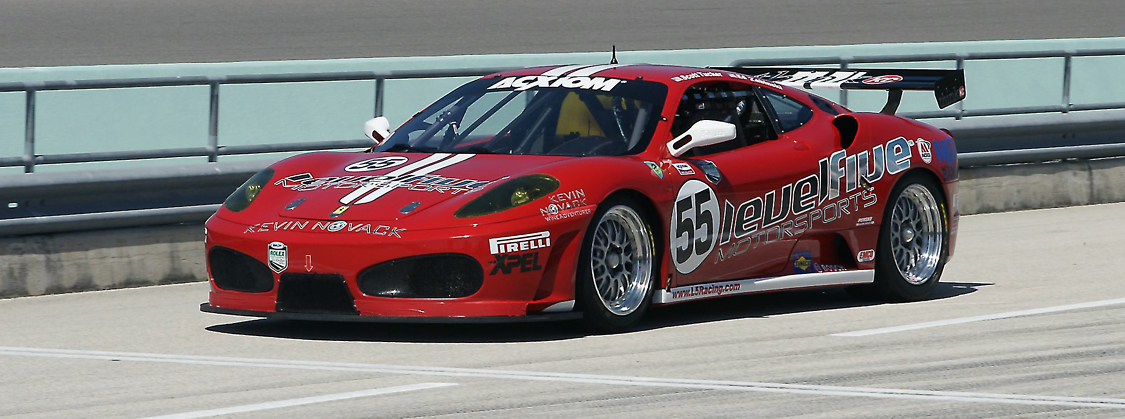
Scott Tucker in a Ferrari Crawford GT

Tucker began competing in the Grand-Am Rolex Sports Car Series in a partial season during the year 2007. In 2008, Scott Tucker debuted in the Rolex 24 at Daytona driving a TRG Grand-Am GT Porsche in the Rolex Series driving with Ed Zabinski, Jack Baldwin, Martin Ragginger and Claudio Burton. The team finished 28th in class due to an engine failure in the 20th hour of the event. After the Rolex 24, Tucker entered Level 5 Motorsports in 3 additional races with Ed Zabinski in the Rolex Series.

In 2009, Tucker teamed up with French sports car driver Christophe Bouchut and earned a career best finish of third at Watkins Glen International.

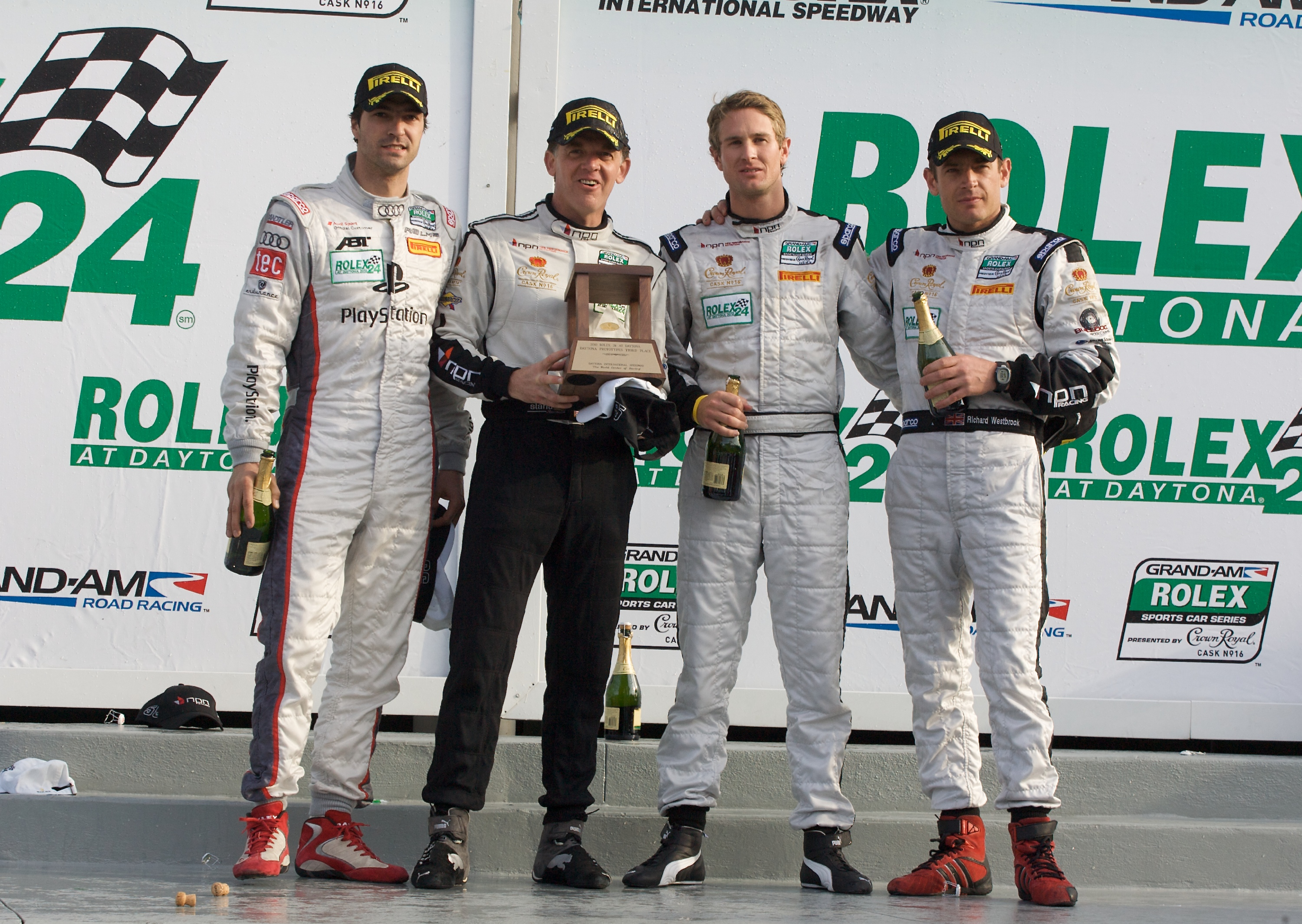
Tucker with co-drivers Richard Westbrook, Ryan Hunter-Reay, and Lucas Luhr at Daytona

Tucker drove both cars at Homestead-Miami Speedway, teaming up with Bouchut in the No. 55 car. In 2010, Tucker added four-time Champ Car World Series champion Sébastien Bourdais, Richard Westbrook, Sascha Maassen, Lucas Luhr, Ryan Hunter-Reay, and Emmanuel Collard to his team for the 48th running of the Rolex 24 At Daytona. Tucker and Level 5's progress through the race was part of a documentary entitled Daytona Dream. The documentary was produced by Drive Digital Media, a venture Scott Tucker was an investor in.

=== American Le Mans Series ===
Tucker competed in the American Le Mans Series in 2010 alongside his campaign in the Rolex Sports Car Series, this time entered in the spec racing Le Mans Prototype Challenge (LMPC) class. As in Rolex, Tucker divides driving duties between both Level 5 cars. Tucker, along with Bouchut and new teammate Mark Wilkins, won the 12 Hours of Sebring in the LMPC category. The trio went on to win three further races during the season, at Laguna Seca, Miller, and Mid-Ohio. Tucker won the LMPC class championship and was named the American Le Mans Series Rookie of the Year.

Moving into the LMP2 category for 2011, Tucker and his Level 5 Motorsports obtained a new Lola-Honda prototypes. Tucker was part of the winning team in the 12 Hours of Sebring. Due to a lack of competitors in LMP2 class of the American Le Mans Series, Level 5 concentrated on the Intercontinental Le Mans Cup rounds in Europe.

Tucker and Level 5 returned Stateside and won three end-of-season American Le Mans Series races, including the Petit Le Mans with its new HPD ARX-01g.

In 2012, Tucker and Level 5 embarked on a full-season campaign in the ALMS P2 category with two new HPD ARX-03bs. Tucker scored eight class wins to claim the 2012 P2 championship.

In 2013, Tucker went on to claim his fourth ALMS drivers' championship after scoring eight class wins in ten races.

=== United SportsCar Championship ===
Tucker won the 2014 Daytona 24 Hours in the GT Daytona class in the No. 555 Level 5 Motorsports Ferrari 458 Italia GT3 with co-drivers Jeff Segal, Townsend Bell, Bill Sweedler and Alessandro Pier Guidi, despite the car having initially been handed a penalty for deemed late-race avoidable contact. IMSA reversed the call more than four hours after the race, declaring the No. 555 car the winners in GTD. The Daytona win came on the 60th anniversary of Ferrari racing in America.

=== 24 Hours of Le Mans ===
Tucker and Level 5 teammate Christophe Bouchut were able to join the driver line-up of the German Kolles team for the 2010 24 Hours of Le Mans, driving one of two diesel-powered Audi R10 TDIs. The two, joined by Frenchman Manuel Rodrigues, failed to finish the race.

In 2011, Tucker scored his first career Le Mans podium result, combining with co-drivers Christophe Bouchut and João Barbosa in Level 5 Motorsports' Lola B11/80 Honda Coupe for a third-place finish in LMP2. The result came in Level 5's debut race as an entrant in the race.

In 2012, Tucker competed in LMP2 and finished 14th. His team finished 13th in LMP2 during the 2013 24 Hours of Le Mans.

=== SCCA ===
In 2012, Tucker was the national title holder in the D Sports Racing category driving a West chassis car purpose-built for the task, claiming the SCCA record lap at Road America with a time of 1:58.997. West Race Cars was purchased by Level 5 in 2011, and significant resources and money were expended by Level 5 to build the record-breaking car.

== Racing record ==
=== SCCA National Championship Runoffs ===
Year	Track	Car	Engine	Class	Finish	Start	Status
2006	Heartland Park	Ferrari 360 Challenge	Ferrari	Touring 1	13	19	Running
2008	Heartland Park	Ferrari 360 Modena	Ferrari	Touring 1	3	4	Running
2009	Road America	Ferrari 430 Challenge	Ferrari	Touring 1	1	1	Running
2010	Road America	Ferrari 430 Challenge	Ferrari	Touring 1	1	1	Running
2011	Road America	Porsche 996	Porsche	STO	1	1	Running
2012	Road America	West Wx10	Suzuki	D Sports Racing	1	1	Running
2012	Road America	Porsche GT3 Cup	Porsche	GT2	12	5	Running
2012	Road America	Porsche 996	Porsche	STO	1	1	Running

=== 24 Hours of Le Mans results ===
Racing results for Scott Tucker
Year	Team	Co-Drivers	Car	Class	Laps	Pos.	Class Pos.
2010	(Germany) Kolles (United States) Level 5 Motorsports	(France) Manuel Rodrigues (France) Christophe Bouchut	Audi R10 TDI	LMP1	182	DNF	DNF
2011	(United States) Level 5 Motorsports	(France) Christophe Bouchut (Portugal) João Barbosa	Lola B11/80-HPD	LMP2	319	10th	3rd
2012	(United States) Level 5 Motorsports	(France) Christophe Bouchut (Mexico) Luis Díaz	HPD ARX-03b	LMP2	240	DNF	DNF
2013	(United States) Level 5 Motorsports	(Australia) Ryan Briscoe (United Kingdom) Marino Franchitti	HPD ARX-03b	LMP2	242	NC	NC

== Personal life ==
Tucker grew up in Kansas City, Missouri and went to Rockhurst High School. He studied business administration at Kansas State University. Tucker is married to his wife Kim and has two daughters.

== Popular culture ==
Tucker is a playable driver in Ferrari Challenge: Trofeo Pirelli.

Tucker's illegal activities are chronicled in the 2018 episode "Payday" of the Netflix documentary series Dirty Money.

Tucker's payday loan scheme was also profiled in the 2020 episode "The Fast and the Fraudulent", of the television series American Greed.
