= Minetti Sports Cars =

Australian sports car manufacturer

- Industry: Automotive
- Founded: 2003
- Headquarters: Sunshine Coast, Queensland, Australia,
- Products: Racing cars

Minetti Sports Cars is an Australian company that designs and constructs racing cars. It was established in 2003 and is located on the Sunshine Coast, Queensland. Minetti started with the ZZ/I design, utilised for small engine capacity prototype sports car racing. Since then, Minetti has followed up with the SS-V1 design. Both cars have utilised motorcycle-sourced engines, mostly Suzuki Hayabusa, for powerplants to run in the Supersports category. The earlier ZZ/I design has won championships at state level in both New South Wales and Queensland. At the same time, the later SS-V1 has had class wins in the QLD Sportscar Championship and also took out the 2008 National Supersprint Championship.
