= 2018 Australian Prototype Series =

The 2018 Australian Prototype Series was an Australian motor racing competition for Group 2C Supersports, Group 6SR Sports Racers, FIA Group CN cars and Group 2A Sports Cars. It was contested over a five rounds series which was managed by Australian Prototype Series Pty Ltd and sanctioned by the Confederation of Australian Motor Sport (CAMS) as an Authorised Series.

The series was won by Jason Makris driving a Wolf GB08CN.
