= Clubman Sports 1300 =

Australian sports car

The Australian Clubman, later known as Sports 1300 class catered for small capacity front engine rear wheel drive sportscars initially similar to the road going sports cars such as the Lotus 7 and to other Clubman series internationally. These cars were simple two seat cars based on widely available road car components in a purpose-built space frame chassis and simple bodywork using cycle guards over the front wheels. The basic features of these cars were

- Front engine Hotchkiss drive
- Live axle rear with open differential
- Basic bodywork with front cycle guards
- Engine and transmission modifications limited

These cars could keep up with Australian Formula 3 cars in the 1970s, when both classes ran similar engines, while being much cheaper.

== History ==
Clubman racing in Australia dates back to the 1950s but didn't emerge as a distinct category with its own set of rules separate to other sportscars until the 60's. at this point an engine capacity limit of 1100cc was introduced. However, alongside this class were 1500cc cars of a similar design and construction that would run alongside the 1100cc cars as invited sportscars. These cars were not technically clubman class cars although very similar and because of that they had to run to Group A Sports Cars regulations. This meant they had to run doors for example, as opposed to the clubman cars which just had a cut-out to allow access.

The Confederation of Australian Motorsport, who ran Motorsport in Australia, decided to change the capacity of the open wheel classes to 1300cc and 1600cc for Australian Formula 3 and Australian Formula 2 respectively and with that the clubman class was changed to 1300cc to mirror the F3 car engine regulations. These regulations specified an engine of no more than 1.3 litres, single camshaft engine of production car origin. These new 1300cc engines were mainly sourced from Japanese manufacturers such as Datsun and Toyota. These engines outshone the older style 1500cc cars and these became less popular.

The class went through distinct but overlapping periods where new ideas on design or rule changes lead to new directions in car design. Initially clubman style cars looked very similar to their road going counterparts such as the Lotus 7. This was followed by lower cars that were potentially more aerodynamic but probably just reflected a lower centre of gravity. These cars though were still very similar to their road going cousins with no attempt at gaining aerodynamic downforce being attempted or allowed by the rules. This period was replaced by cars that began to use upswept tails and full width sportscar noses to create more aerodynamic cars capable of producing some level of downforce. The final stage of this evolution before the class morphed into the Supersports category was the addition of wings first allowed in the early 2000s. At about this time there was a change to engines too with the twin cam Suzuki G13B engine being allowed into the category.
