= Williams FW15C =

1993 Formula One racing car by Williams

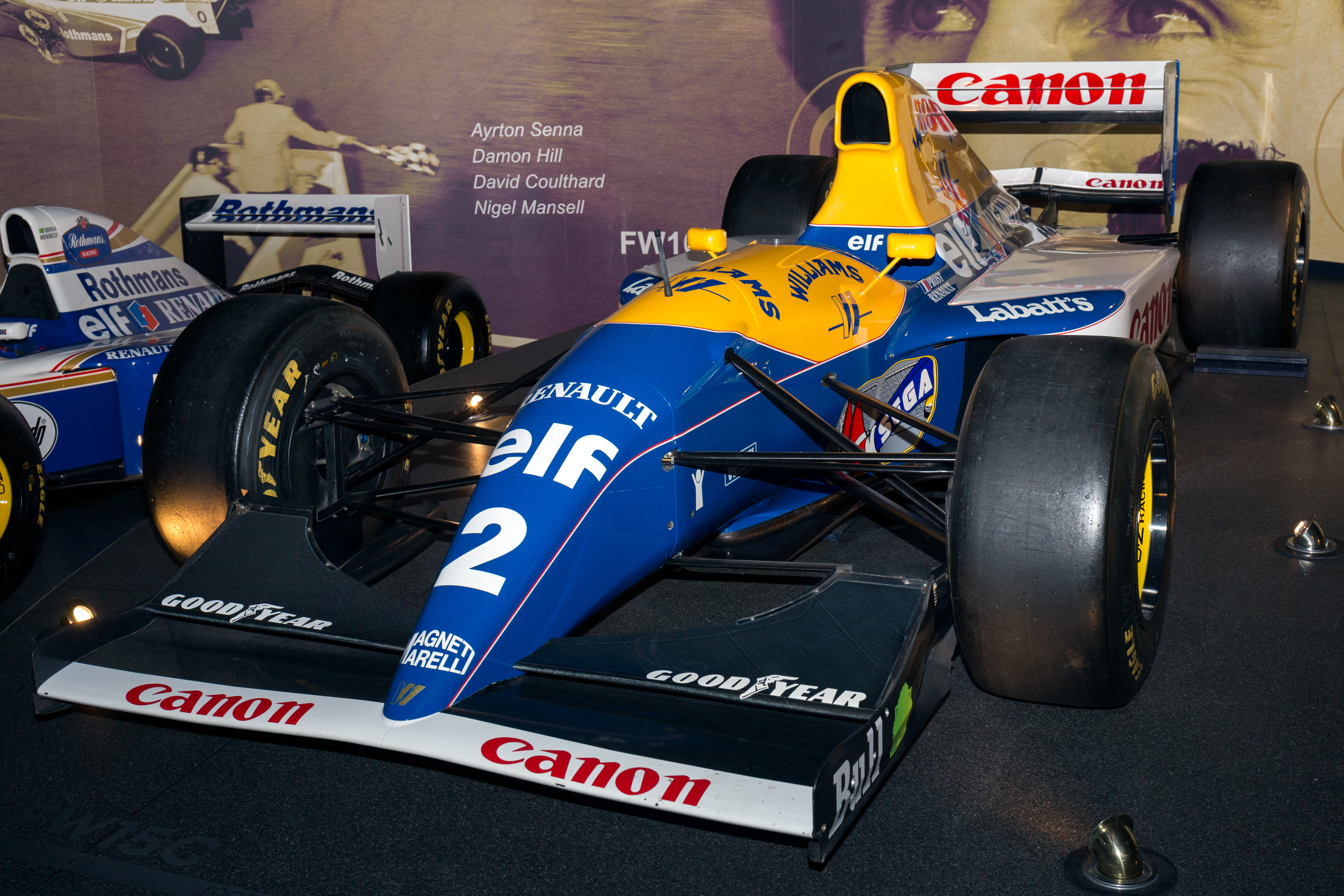
- The FW15C of Alain Prost on display at the Williams Conference Centre
- Category: Formula One
- Constructor: Williams (chassis, transmission, electronics); Renault Sport (engine)
- Designers: Patrick Head (Technical Director); Adrian Newey (Chief Designer); Paddy Lowe (Head of Special Projects); Steve Wise (Head of Electronics); Eghbal Hamidy (Chief Aerodynamicist); Bernard Dudot (Chief Engine Designer (Renault))
- Predecessor: FW14B
- Successor: FW16

Technical specifications
- Chassis: Carbon fibre and Aramid monocoque
- Suspension (front): Pushrod, Williams hydropneumatic active suspension system
- Suspension (rear): Pushrod, Williams hydropneumatic active suspension system
- Axle track: Front: 1,670 mm (66 in); Rear: 1,600 mm (63 in)
- Wheelbase: 2,921 mm (115.0 in)
- Engine: Renault RS5, 3,493 cc (213.2 cu in), 67° V10, NA, mid-engine, longitudinally-mounted
- Transmission: Williams continuously variable transmission
- Power: 760–780 bhp (567–582 kW; 771–791 PS) @ 13,800 rpm
- Weight: 505 kg (1,113 lb)
- Fuel: Elf
- Tyres: Goodyear

Competition history
- Notable entrants: Canon Williams Renault
- Notable drivers: 0. (United Kingdom) Damon Hill; 2. (France) Alain Prost
- Debut: 1993 South African Grand Prix
- First win: 1993 South African Grand Prix
- Last win: 1993 Italian Grand Prix
- Last event: 1993 Australian Grand Prix
Races	Wins	Poles	F/Laps
16	10	15	10
- Constructors' Championships: 1 (1993)
- Drivers' Championships: 1 (1993, Alain Prost)

The Williams FW15C is a Formula One car designed by Adrian Newey and built by Williams Grand Prix Engineering for use in the 1993 Formula One World Championship.

As the car that won both the Drivers' and Constructors' Championships in the last season before the FIA banned electronic driver aids, the FW15C (along with its racing predecessor FW14B) was, in 2005, considered to be one of the most technologically sophisticated Formula One cars of all time, incorporating anti-lock brakes, traction control, active suspension, and a semi-automatic and fully-automatic gearbox.

== Predecessors ==
=== FW15 ===
The original FW15 was a new car designed in 1991 to incorporate the active suspension changes developed by Frank Dernie and implemented on the 1992 season's FW14B. The FW14B had initially been designed as a passive car (FW14) and had been pushed into being active. This meant it had various new active components implemented on the car which had not been in the original design brief. It was therefore considered a relatively overweight package. The original FW15 was an active car from the start which enabled a much tidier package closer to the minimum weight limit. However, the success of the FW14B meant that the FW15 was not needed in 1992.

=== FW15B ===
The FW15B was a 1992 FW15 hastily converted to the 1993 regulations featuring narrower front suspension, narrower rear tyres, raised nose and wing endplates, and narrower wings to enable early season testing for 1993.

== Design and technical development ==
=== Chassis ===
Building on the successful FW14B which took Nigel Mansell and Williams to both titles in 1992, the car was the first all-new car to be produced by Patrick Head and Adrian Newey in collaboration (Head had designed many of Williams's previous cars, while Newey had designed cars for the March and Leyton House Racing teams).

With Newey's aerodynamic input the FW15 was a significant improvement on its predecessor, with a narrower nose, sleeker airbox and engine cover and carefully sculpted sidepods. Another new feature was the larger rear wing used at high-downforce circuits which featured an extra element ahead and above the main wing (similar to the 'winglets' seen in Grand Prix racing in 1983 and 1984).

The car was available in August 1992, but given the success and improved reliability of the FW14B, prudence dictated that the new car did not make its debut until the following year's season-opener in South Africa. As a result of the huge difference in build of their two drivers (Alain Prost was nearly half a foot shorter than Damon Hill), Williams eventually opted to build two slightly different FW15C tubs, so as to accommodate Hill's size 12 feet, as he had repeatedly complained of cramp in the tight confines around the pedals.

The FW15C had 12% better aerodynamics (downforce/drag) and an engine with 30 additional horsepower than the FW14B. Newey said in an interview in 1994 that the aerodynamics on the FW14B were messy due to the switch to active suspension from passive suspension, and that the FW15C was an aerodynamically cleaned up version of the aero on the FW14B.

In addition, the FW15C featured an ABS braking system which was not available on the FW14B and featured a 210L fuel tank, compared to the 230L tank in the FW14B.

=== Engine ===
Renault went into their fifth year with Williams and again proved to be the class of the field, with their RS5 67° V10 engine producing at least 760–780 bhp (570–580 kW), at least 80–100 hp (60–75 kW) more than Benetton and McLaren's Ford V8 (before having to settle on customer Fords, McLaren boss Ron Dennis had even tried unsuccessfully to get a supply of 1992 spec (RS4) Renault V10s for his team to use), and with less of a penalty in terms of extra fuel carried than Ferrari's powerful but thirsty 041 3.5 litre V12. Renault had acquired a reputation for almost bullet-proof reliability but Williams did suffer three engine failures during races in 1993, although on each occasion the sister car won the race.

The French Grand Prix was a PR dream for Renault, with a French driver leading home the team's only 1–2 finish of the year, while Hill's victory at the Belgian race was Renault's 50th Formula One win.

=== Transmission ===
The FW15C used a semi-automatic transmission very similar to the FW14B, but with changes to the hydraulic activation system. A press button starting device by means of which the clutch comes under automatic control attracted the drivers' unreserved approval during a succession of tests, but they did not use it in races, preferring the notional, psychological reassurance of controlling the clutch pedal at the start.

The transmission also featured an automatic system. If the "auto-up" button is pressed, which could be at any time on the circuit, it will do automatic changes until the next time drivers call for a gear change with the levers. The software is so programmed that it recognises when a driver calls for a gear change before the automatic system is ready to do so and immediately hands back control to the manual system.

=== Electronics ===
By 1993, Formula One had become very much a high-tech arena and the FW15C was at the very forefront, featuring active suspension, anti-lock brakes, traction control, telemetry, drive-by-wire controls, pneumatic engine valve springs, power steering, semi-automatic transmission, a fully-automatic transmission, and also a continuously variable transmission (CVT), although the latter was only used in testing. As a result, Alain Prost described the car as "a little Airbus". CVTs have the potential to dramatically increase average engine power over a lap, providing a significant advantage over competing teams. They would have also required the engine to run at a constant speed for a longer period of time, posing design challenges. CVTs were explicitly banned from Formula 1 in 1994, just two weeks after successful tests of the CVT in 1993.

While anti-lock brakes and traction control made driving the car on the limit easier, an added complication arose from occasions when the computer systems wrongly interpreted the information they were receiving from their sensors, the active suspension being particularly prone to this from time to time.

With so many computer systems onboard the car required three laptop computers to be connected to it every time it was fired up: one each for the engine, the telemetry, and the suspension.

The FW15C also featured a push-to-pass system (left yellow button on the steering wheel), which would use the active suspension to lower the car at the rear and eliminate the drag from the diffuser, effectively increasing speed through a lack of downforce. Williams was able to use the electronics, so they could sync up a flawless link that would simultaneously set the engine for another 300 revs, and raise the active suspension for when the driver needed extra speed while overtaking.

This system could be seen being used by Hill and Prost numerous times in 1993 while attempting passing manoeuvres.

So great was the level of technology on the cars that FIA decided to ban several of what they considered to be "driver aids" with immediate effect following the British Grand Prix, leading to the so-called "Weikershof Protocol", by which the ban was postponed to the start of 1994.

== Drivers ==
An all new driver line-up was featured. Triple world champion Alain Prost had signed with Williams for the 1993 season, having spent the previous year out of motorsport competition on a sabbatical. Reigning Champion Nigel Mansell departed Formula One, over a dispute with Frank Williams about money and the signing of Prost as despite Mansell being the reigning World Champion, Frank Williams would not guarantee him No.1 Driver status over 3 time Champion Prost (plus Mansell wasn't too keen on having the Frenchman as a team mate again after their 1990 season as team mates at Ferrari). Thus Mansell decided to race in the American CART series for 1993, while Riccardo Patrese moved to Benetton-Ford. The unfortunate Patrese, who had been with the team since the last race of the 1987 season in Australia during which time he had won 4 races and finished 2nd in the 1992 Championship to Mansell as well as finishing 3rd in the 1989 title race, had signed with Benetton in the belief that Prost and Mansell would be the Williams drivers in 1993 and did not know he could have stayed with the Grove-based team until Mansell announced his departure from Formula One. Mika Häkkinen was considered for the vacancy, though it was largely known that he intended to sign with McLaren, and Frank Williams admitted to Prost at a pre-season test at Estoril that the team's engineers were pushing him to sign the team's test driver for the past two years Damon Hill largely based on his speed and knowledge of the car. In the end, Williams and Patrick Head opted to sign Hill, the son of late 2-time World Champion Graham Hill, despite the fact that he had made only two previous Grand Prix starts for Brabham in 1992.

Williams retained this driver pairing in all 16 races in 1993.

With McLaren having lost its supply of Honda engines after the Japanese company pulled out of the sport at the end of 1992, triple World Champion Ayrton Senna, who had previously had a test with Williams in 1983, had repeatedly tried to get Frank Williams to sign him and even went so far as to offer his services for free, but a clause in Prost's contract specifically forbade Williams signing Senna as Prost's team-mate and the Brazilian instead opted to remain at McLaren on a race-by-race basis (until finally re-signing with them for the remainder of the season just before the British Grand Prix). However, Prost's clause only covered the 1993 season and after he announced his impending retirement at the Portuguese Grand Prix, it was later announced that Senna would be joining Williams in 1994.

== Racing history ==
=== Season performance ===
Williams quickly established themselves as the team to beat, with Prost winning in South Africa by a margin of almost a lap over Senna's McLaren. The FW15C was so dominant in qualifying that Prost and Hill often qualified 1.5 to 2 seconds in front of Schumacher or Senna. For example, at the Brazilian Grand Prix, Prost out-qualified his teammate by a whole second at Interlagos, who was again a second ahead of the eventual winner Senna. In the race Prost retired midway through, a victim of someone else's accident, and Senna managed to get past Hill to win, with the Englishman registering his first podium and points in F1 in second. The third race of the season at Donington Park saw Senna's most dominant performance, with Hill taking second with Prost inheriting third from the Jordan-Hart of Rubens Barrichello late on after the Brazilian lost fuel pressure resulting in his retirement. The Frenchman's race was hampered by intermittent gearbox problems in addition to seven pit stops to change tyres in the changeable conditions.

With three races gone Senna lay 12 points ahead of Prost, but it was already becoming clear that even Senna in his prime would struggle to keep ahead of Prost and the superior Williams-Renault, and so it proved with the team going on a run of nine wins in the next ten races. Dominant displays from Prost at Imola and Spain lifted him above Senna in the standings, but Senna regained the lead with his sixth and final win at Monaco before Prost's Canada win gave him back the lead.

By now Hill was starting to consistently challenge his teammate. The Englishman was in touch with Prost nose to tail virtually throughout the French Grand Prix at Magny-Cours, and seemed to be set fair for his debut win in the British Grand Prix before a rare engine failure 18 laps from the end left the home crowd disappointed. In Germany, Hill came even closer after a stop-go penalty held Prost up, but this time the Englishman's rear tyre suffered a puncture on the penultimate lap, with Prost again claiming the win.

In Hungary Hill finally got his first win, a task made easier after Prost stalled on the warm-up lap and had to start from the rear of the grid. Prost fought his way up to fourth before a rear wing failure ended his bid for a points finish, but a retirement for Senna meant there was no ground lost. Hill made up for lost time completing a hat trick of wins in Belgium and Italy. Hill and Prost's 1-3 finishes, respectively, at Spa secured Williams their sixth Constructors' Championship.

Senna experienced a terrible run of fortune but was still in with a mathematical chance of the title as the teams met in Portugal, but Prost's second place was enough to secure his fourth World Drivers' Championship, prompting the Frenchman to announce his retirement at the end of the year. In the last two races in Japan and Australia respectively, Prost followed Senna home, which meant Hill dropped to third behind the Brazilian in the final Championship standings.

=== Criticisms ===
The primary criticism of the FW15C was an inconsistent handling manner arising from occasions when the computer systems wrongly interpreted the information they were receiving from their sensors, or due to air being present in the hydraulics of the active system. Slight changes to the weight distribution of this latest Williams produced a car that was slightly more responsive than its immediate predecessor, if rather more nervous when driven on the limit. In particular this trait manifested itself in slight rear-end instability under braking, most notable on high speed circuits such as Hockenheim when the car was operating in a low downforce trim. It was a trait that particularly caused problems for the smoother driving style of Alain Prost who could set up the car best when it had even handling characteristics.

Alain Prost was quoted as saying:

"I think that an active suspension car with traction control needs to be thrown around quite a lot, whereas I like to drive a little more quietly, perhaps using the throttle more sensitively, which perhaps is not needed quite so much in an active car".

In the wet the car also exhibited a tendency to momentarily lock the rear wheels during downchanges. This however was alleviated with the fitting of a power throttle system at Imola ensuring that the revs could be perfectly matched when the clutch was engaged.

Prost also later said that although he was amazed at the general quality and technology of the car, the FW15C was not his favorite car to drive and work with, as it was such a different car to drive and work with than any of the other cars he had driven before.

== Livery ==
This was the final year that Williams had title sponsorship from Canon, who had sponsored the team since 1985 and cigarette brand Camel since 1991. Williams used the 'Camel' logos, except at the French, British, German and European Grands Prix, where they were replaced with either a Camel emblem or "Williams" text.

Japanese video game company Sega joined as the team's major sponsor. Some of the Sega related decals including a Sonic's foot on the pedal, shifting and race winning trophies on the rear wing.

== FW15D ==
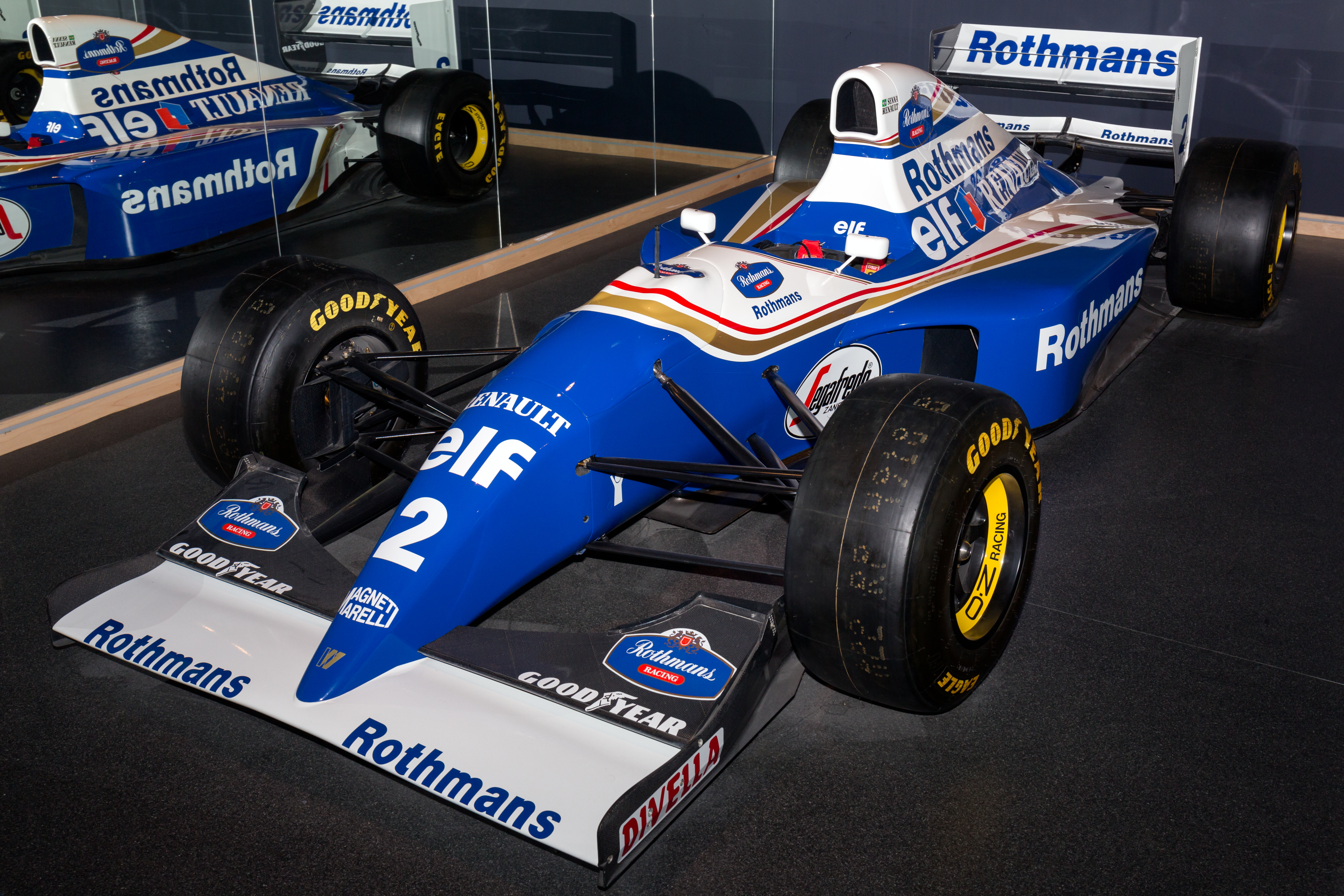
Williams FW15D on display at the Williams Conference Centre in Grove, Oxfordshire.

In early 1994, two FW15C chassis were modified to run without electronic driving aids, which were banned for 1994. The FW15D was an interim car with passive suspension, and no traction control. The cars were tested by Senna and Hill in January 1994, but the car was far from optimal, as it was originally designed around an active suspension system. The FW15D was used during the Rothmans Williams Renault launch at Estoril, on 19 January 1994 (Notably with Hill driving with an onboard camera recorder, and not Senna as many have incorrectly assumed). The car was retired once the FW16 became available, yet it was notably the quicker car of the two in early season testing laptimes.

== Complete Formula One results ==
(key) (results in bold indicate pole position; results in italics indicate fastest lap)

Year	Team	Engine	Tyres	Drivers	1	2	3	4	5	6	7	8	9	10	11	12	13	14	15	16	Pts.	WCC
1993	Canon Williams	Renault RS5; V10	**G**		RSA	BRA	EUR	SMR	ESP	MON	CAN	FRA	GBR	GER	HUN	BEL	ITA	POR	JPN	AUS	**168**	**1st**
1993	Canon Williams	Renault RS5; V10	**G**	(United Kingdom) Damon Hill	Ret	2	2	Ret	Ret	2	3	**2**	Ret	15	1	1	1	**3**	4	3	**168**	**1st**
1993	Canon Williams	Renault RS5; V10	**G**	(France) Alain Prost	**1**	**Ret**	**3**	**1**	**1**	**4**	**1**	1	**1**	**1**	**12**	**3**	**12**	2	**2**	2	**168**	**1st**

== Sponsors ==
Brand	Country	Placed on
Canon	Japan	Sidepods, nose, front wing, rear wing
Save The Children	United Kingdom	Side
Magnetti Marelli	Italy	Nose
Renault	France	Sides, nose
Elf	France	Sides, nose
Labatt's	Canada	Sidepods
Camel	United States	Fin, nose
Bull	France	Front wing end plate
Sega	Japan	Side

Awards
Preceded by Williams FW14B	Autosport; Racing Car Of The Year; 1993	Succeeded by Benetton B194
