= Chiron World Sports Cars =

British racecar constructor

- Type: Private limited company
- Industry: Manufacture of motor vehicles
- Founded: 3 October 2002; 24 years ago
- Founder: Henry Nickless
- Headquarters: Worcester, England
- Key people: Henry Nickless
- Products: Sports prototype racing cars

Chiron World Sports Cars is a British company, based in Worcester, which designs and constructs racing cars. It was founded in 2002 by Henry Nickless and registered as Chiron World Sports Cars Limited that October.

The company has built only sports prototypes, concentrating on small-capacity classes of up to 2000 cc of the kind raced as Supersports, and has supplied customer cars with a choice of engines, among them Vauxhall and MG units. Its designs took consecutive National Supersports championships in Britain in 2003 and 2004, and went on to win several further titles in the class; exported examples competed in Australia, where a Chiron won the Australian Prototype Series in 2019.

== History ==
The business was registered as Chiron World Sports Cars Limited on 3 October 2002, as a private limited company with its registered office at Granta Lodge, Graham Road, Malvern, Worcestershire. Its registered nature of business is the manufacture of motor vehicles, and the company remained active as of 2026.

Henry Nickless ran the concern as team boss, overseeing both construction and the running of works-supported entries. By 2010 he had taken on a second role as managing director of the low-volume road car maker Aspira Cars, presenting its first car at the Autosport International show that January; trade coverage of the launch introduced him to readers as the figure behind the Worcester-based Chiron operation.

== Cars ==
The firm's early car was entered as the Chiron 002 during 2003, while the car raced by Doug Hart in 2005 carried the designation LMP3-04.

Customers could specify a choice of power units according to budget. Cars run under the firm's own banner used Vauxhall units prepared by Swindon, while for 2005 the driver Doug Hart switched to MG power, a 290 bhp engine developed by Judd being fitted to his LMP3-04.

== Competitions ==
=== United Kingdom ===
Chiron cars contested the Dunlop National Supersports Championship from 2003. At the Pembrey Circuit round on 10 May that year, Stephen Shanly brought a Chiron 002 home second in the third race of the series, finishing 0.763 seconds behind the winner and recording the fastest lap of the race at 94.47 mph. Shanly went on to take the championship in both 2003 and 2004. Nickless said that the car concerned had started 33 races across those two seasons without once failing to finish, and that it held lap records at several circuits.

After Shanly moved on at the end of 2004, the company announced plans to enter three cars in the British Automobile Racing Club's Open Sports Racing Cup for 2005, with Hart and Peter Hobday confirmed and a third seat offered to a paying driver. By 2010, the design had accumulated several Supersports titles and was also being raced in the French-based V de V series and in Speed series competition.

=== Australia ===
Chiron prototypes were exported to Australia, where they competed in the Australian Prototype Series as part of the Shannons Nationals programme. At Queensland Raceway in July 2018, David Barram took pole position and won the opening race of the round in a Chiron LMP3, finishing just over four seconds clear of the field.

Barram led the 2019 series for much of the season. At Sydney Motorsport Park in May, he won the opening race of the round, although a sticking throttle in the second race dropped him behind the eventual round winner Mark Short. He finished the weekend third overall. At the Queensland Raceway round in August his Chiron was put out of the second race by a last-lap collision with Daniel Gonzalez, both cars sustaining terminal damage.

Barram secured the 2019 Australian Prototype Series title at the final round at The Bend Motorsport Park, taking the round win after finishing second in the closing race, with Mark Laucke runner-up in the standings and John-Paul Drake third. The car he used had been built around 2005 and had been rebuilt following heavy damage sustained two weeks before the deciding round.
