= West Race Cars =

Race car manufacturer based in Adelaide, Australia

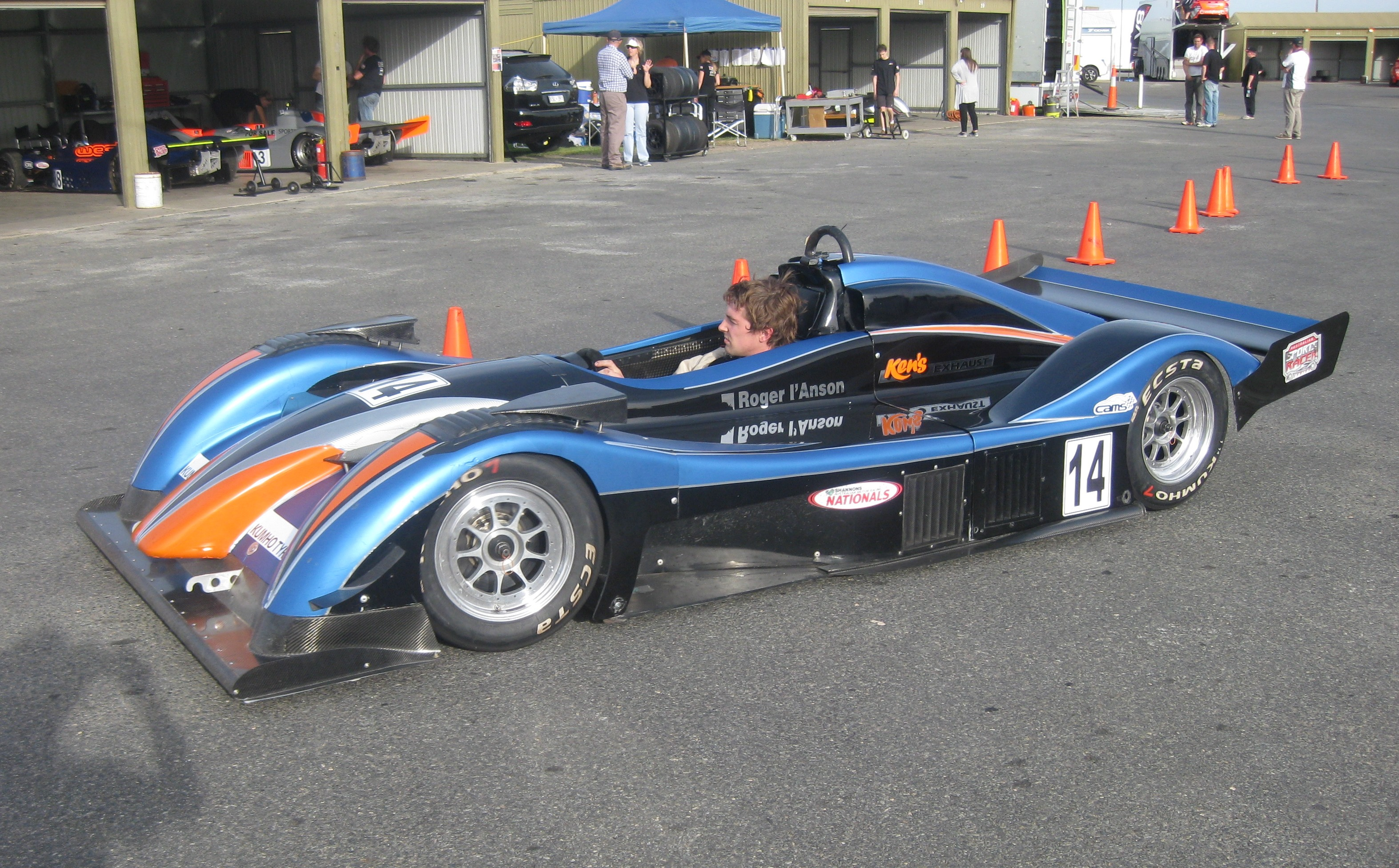
- West WR1000
- Company type: Subsidiary
- Founded: 2005
- Founder: Gregory Steer
- Headquarters: Melrose Park, Adelaide, Australia
- Area served: USA, Asia-Pacific & Australia
- Key people: Gregory Steer (Chairman, Founder)
- Parent: West Motorsport Australia (since 2014)
- Website: www.westracecars.com.au

West Race Cars is a race car manufacturer based in Adelaide, Australia. It was founded in 2005 by Greg Steer and a small consortium of sports racer enthusiasts. Since 2014 it has become a wholly owned subsidiary of West Motorsport Australia.

== History ==
- Founded: 2005
- Folded: 2012
- Team principal(s): Greg Steer
- Former series: IMSA Lites L2 (2007-2012); AMRS Thunder Sports Championship (2007), Australian Sports Racer Series 2012
- Noted drivers: (United States) Eric Vassian (2007-2012) (United States) Jim Garrett (2007-2010) (United States) Robby Card (2009) (United States) Carlos Llano (Australia) Tom Drewer (2008)
- Teams' Championships: 2008 IMSA Lites L2
- Drivers' Championships: 2007 AMRS Thunder Sports Championship; 2008 IMSA Lites L2

=== IMSA Lites ===
West Race Cars is owned by West Motorsport Australia Ltd. West was founded in 2005 by a small consortium of enthusiasts that included Greg Steer in Portland Oregon. The brand was originally focussed only on SCCA DSR competition. Between 2005 and 2007 the West brand was successfully launched in Australia by Steer under the CAMS category Group 6 SR and a race series was created to support the sports racer concept. West invested heavily in engineering & aerodynamic development to design the revolutionary and stunning looking WX10, to replace the ageing WR1000. In 2007 West ownership transferred from the Consortium to Eric Vassian and the company moved shop to Buford, Georgia. Vassian was instrumental in a deal that saw West contracted to provide the IMSA Lites L2 class with spec racing sports cars. Vassian also produced the WX10 after 3 years of design and engineering effort. The West WR1000 was the first car produced by West Race Cars with 85 cars produced. In 2009 the first WX10 hit the track and was blindingly fast. The aero alone contributed to an 11 mph top speed gain over the WR1000. The grip level was also increased significantly to make this the fastest sports racer ever. This car featured a factory standard Kawasaki ZX-10R engine.

The first season featured eleven different drivers. Among them were Michael Mallinen, Carl Skerlong and Scott Tucker. After having won the AMRS Thunder Sports Championship in a factory fielded West WR1000, Australian driver Tom Drewer raced the 2008 season in the IMSA Lites. The factory team swept the 2008 season. Drewer won 10 out of 12 races and won the championship. Vassian finished second in the championship and won one race. Third factory driver Jim Garrett finished third in the standings. In 2010 West Australia produced a much needed Aero upgrade to the WR1000, a development that even today keeps the WR1000 a force in Sports Racer, with lap records at every major track in Australia. For the next 3 years Steer dominated the category in Australia, contesting a WR1000 Aero, then the new WX10 - 1000 and a 1340 Hayabusa version.

In 2011 West with a new owner Level 5, invested massive funds in wind tunnel, suspension engineering and engine development to produce the fastest sports racer, in fact the fastest (by lap time) race car in SCCA history. (2012 Runoffs). From 2012 - 2014 West focussed on delivering base model WX10 vehicles to the US & Australian markets. In late 2013 the West LLC brand, business assets and intellectual property was purchased by West Motorsport Australia who then embarked on a program to turn the Tucker prototype sports racer into a production reality. The new car, due to be released in September 2015 will revolutionise the sports racer concept. All of the Level 5 aero and suspension engineering is now manufactured and standard on all new cars. The all new West WX10-RS includes fully integrated CAN bus / MoTec ECU, XAP Dash, 3rd damper style suspension, Ohlins, PFC brake package and the ZX10R engine (turbo Suzuki available too).

=== Club racing ===
In the SCCA the West cars are allowed in the D Sports Racing class. The cars achieved many victories in the many divisions of the SCCA. Kletjian was the first driver in a West at the SCCA National Championship Runoffs and the SCCA June Sprints, the two most prestigious races of the SCCA. Level 5 Motorsports team owner Scott Tucker won the SCCA National Championship Runoffs in the DSR class.

Tucker won the 2012 Runoffs in the DSR class driving a West, with the fastest lap ever recorded in any car in any category in SCCA history 1:56:4.

In Australia, West sports cars race in the Sports Racer Series.
