= Formula Rolon =

Formula Rolon Chevrolet

Overview
- Manufacturer: Super Speeds (Pvt) Ltd, India
- Production: 2006–2010

Body and chassis
- Class: Open Wheeled Formula Racing Car
- Chassis: Spaceframe

Powertrain
- Engine: 1600cc Chevrolet, Rear Mounted, Longitudinal

Formula Rolon, also known as Formula Rolon Chevrolet and later Formula Rolon 2010, is an open wheel single seater Formula Racing car made and raced in India. They run in the single make championships held in the tracks of Coimbatore and Chennai. The car is similar to Formula Asia, and was powered by 1600cc Chevrolet and later Suzuki engines with a racing gear box. The car was launched in Mumbai December 2005 and made its debut in Coimbatore track in September 2006. The 2010 season was its last season as LG Sports announced that it will not enter Formula Rolon for the 2011 season.

== Name ==
The name Rolon is the brand name of automotive chains and sprockets, owned by L.G.Balakrishnan Brothers Ltd. Coimbatore. They are the also the main sponsor and parent company of Super Speeds.

== Design ==
The car is built around a monocoque steel space frame and the body panels are of Composite Fire retardant GRP. Aerodynamic aides include adjustable front wing, and adjustable Flower type rear wing. The Racing Tyres are from JK tyres and the cars have a choice of grooved semi-slick and ungrooved slick version on the Race day.

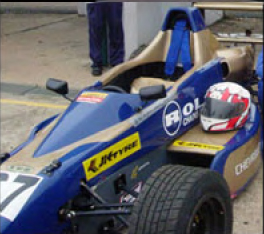
A Formula Rolon car of Thrivikraman team in Chennai MMSC track Pits

The car was entirely designed and constructed by Coimbatore-based Super Speeds, the same company that designed the Formula Maruti in the mid 80's, which is now a division of L.G.Balakrishnan and Brothers. The Chief designer of the car is ex-racing driver B.Vijaykumar and aided by his team of engineers and designers. The car has a high indigenous content of over 97%.

=== Formula Rolon Chevrolet ===
The Formula Rolon Chevrolet (2006–2009) cars were powered by a Chevrolet 1.6 liter engine during the years 2006 till 2009 and the car was known as Formula Rolon Chevrolet, as supplied by General Motors India for a three-year contract. Over 18 cars were manufactured of which 15 were supplied to various teams while three chassis were retained for development activities.

=== Formula Rolon 2010 ===
For the 2010 season Super Speeds launched a short wheelbase version and equipped with the in house race tuned 1.3 liter Suzuki engine with a race tuned EFI. The 2010 model was simply known as Formula Rolon 2010. The short wheelbase has a new exterior design and the car was made 100 kg lighter than the earlier model to improve the power to weight ratio.

=== Engine and Gearbox ===
==== Chevrolet 1600 engines ====
The 1.6 liter engine was supplied by General Motors India for the Formula Rolon Chevrolet versions during the years 2006 till 2009. The Chevrolet 1600 cc engine produced 120 bhp (89 kW) in race trim as of 2006 with a re-chipped ECU; otherwise it was the same stock engine as used in Chevrolet Optra model sold in India. Notable race modifications from the passenger car engine include a re-chipped ECU supplied by GM India, K&N Air filter and tuned Free flow Exhaust pipes while the Head, Block and Camshaft remained the same as in Stock.This was also a first for Chevrolet’s involvement in Racing outside United States.

==== Super Speeds Suzuki 1300 engines ====
For 2010 season, the short wheelbase version was called Formula Rolon 2010 and used a 1300cc 16-valve engines from Suzuki Swift. The 1.3-liter Suzuki engines had modified cylinder heads, race-tuned free-flow exhausts and high-lift camshafts modified to race specifications producing over 40% more power than the factory-stock versions. The engine management systems were supplied by Race Dynamics of Bangalore with a programmable fuel injection system.

The Gearbox was a Racing gear box, with straight-cut dog ring gears and in-built LSD (Limited-Slip Differential) manufactured in-house at Coimbatore by Super Speeds similar to Hewland racing transmission.

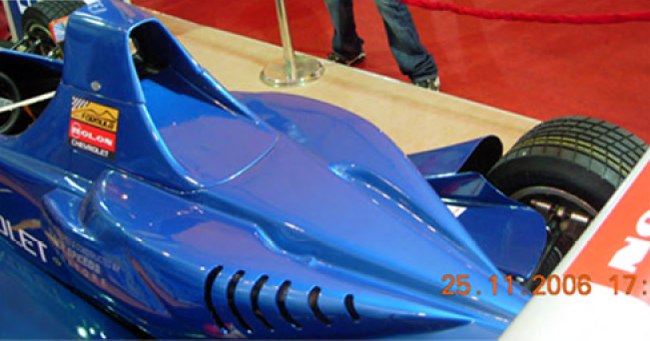
The Engine cover of a Formula Rolon Chevrolet

== Tyres ==
JK tyres of India makes and supplies the tyres specially designed for this car. JK Tyres also sponsor the National championship and few drivers in this series. The tyres are available in Wet and Slicks.

== Costs ==
The drivers racing budget for a 12 race (6 Double races) annual season was costing one tenth compared to a full season in or Formula Asia in other South East Asian countries or Formula Ford in UK in 2006. This series was considered to be the best way to select racers for the Formula Asia and Formula BMW series and was a stepping stone for graduating into higher series of international single seater racing championships.

== Championship races ==
The cars were built for LG Sports, to run in the JK National Road racing championship, which is the breeding ground for young racers in India.

The Cars are sold with the Engine on lease or the complete car leased with three different springs supplied per car. All engines are sealed by LG Sports with the maintenance of the engine by Super Speeds.

The class in which the car races is a single make championship class, with the cars sold or leased to several teams, who in turn engage or hire drivers. The races are annual championship series held in Kari Motor Speedway in Chettipalayam, Coimbatore and in MMSC track in Irungattukottai in Chennai. The Drivers with most points accumulated from his wins and finishing positions becomes the Formula Rolon Chevrolet champion for the respective year.

== Teams ==
- NK racing – Narain Karthikeyan’s team with Speed Petrol (Bharat Petroleum) as Team Sponsors.
- Gemini Racing - Chennai - Akkineni Anand Prasad's scholarship based ace driver outfit
- Mars racings – Chennai
- Meco Racing – Chennai
- Rams Racing – Chennai
- Prime Racing – Coimbatore
- Red Rooster Racing – Bangalore/Chennai
- Team Amaron Pro Racing with MECO
- VA Racing – Chennai

=== Drivers and tuners ===
Notable drivers who have taken part in the series and still involved include ex-Formula 3 champion Akbar Ibhrahim, ex-karting champion Ameya Walavalkar, Asia-Pacific Rally winner Gaurav Gill, ex-Formula Maruti champion Gaurav Dalal, 2005 Formula LGB Champion Reo Banajee, 2006 Formula LGB Swift national champion Saran Vikram Tmars, Aswin Sunder and 2009 Formula Maruti champion Vikash Anand.

== Champions ==
Season	Driver	Team	Chassis/Engine
2006	(India) Gaurav Gill, New Delhi	WSRF with Leela – JK Tyre	Super Speeds – Chevrolet Optra 1.6L DOHC
2007	(India) Adithya Patel, Chennai	NK Racing – Speed Petrol	Super Speeds – Chevrolet Optra 1.6L DOHC
2008	(India) Gaurav Dalal, Chennai	Red Rooster Racing	Super Speeds – Chevrolet Optra 1.6L DOHC
2009	(India) Ashwin Sundar, Chennai	NK Racing	Super Speeds – Chevrolet Optra 1.6L DOHC
2010	(India) Saran vikram tmars, Chennai	Mars Racings	Super Speeds – LGB Rolon Esteem 1.3L SOHC

== See also ==
- Formula Maruti
- Formula LGB Swift
- Formula LGB Hyundai
- JK Tyre National Racing Championship
