= Formula racing =

Open-wheeled single-seater motorsport

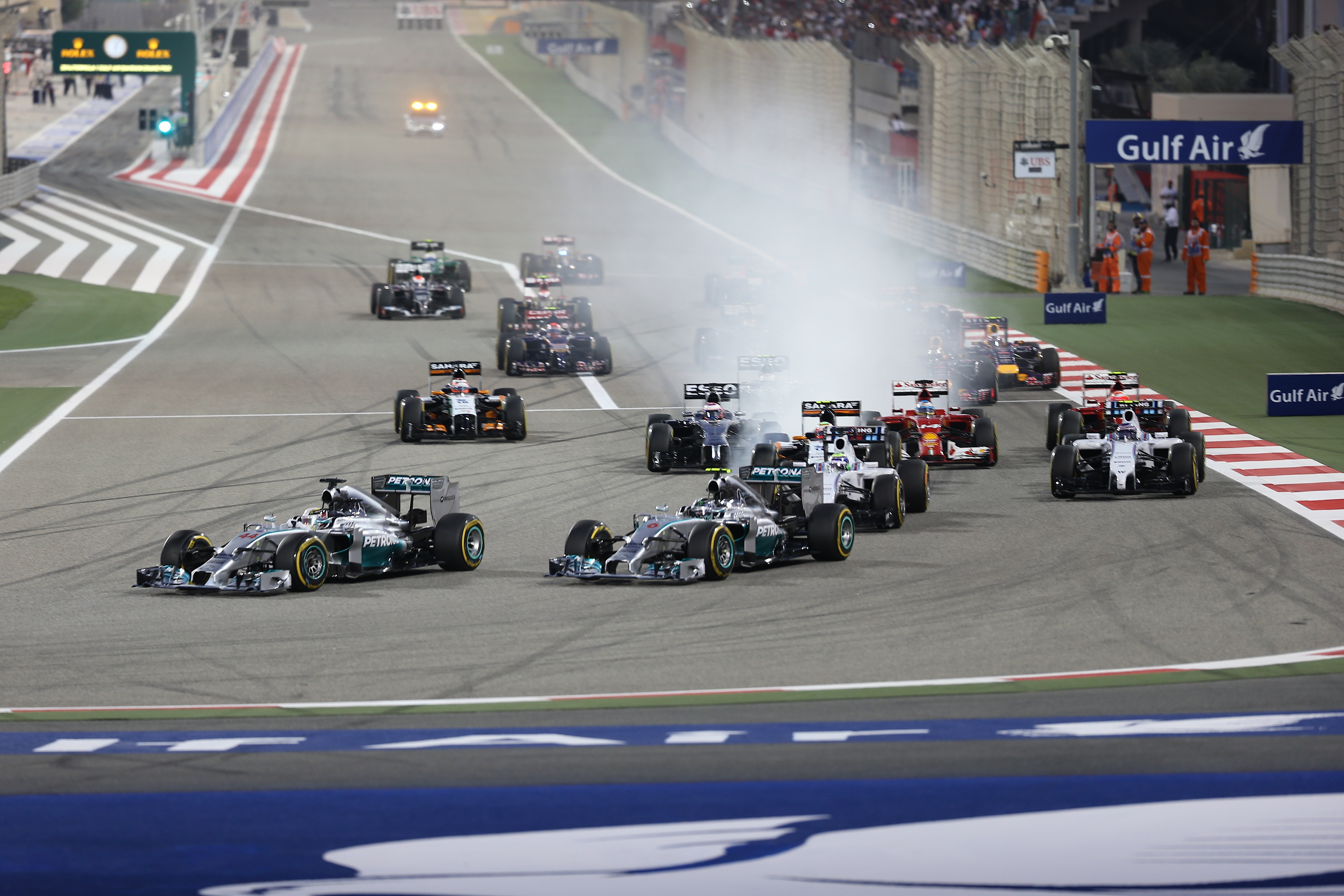
- Start of the Formula One 2014 Bahrain Grand Prix
- Highest governing body: FIA

Characteristics
- Contact: No
- Team members: Yes
- Mixed-sex: Yes
- Type: Circuit racing, road racing
- Equipment: Open-wheel car
- Venue: Permanent road and city street circuits

Formula racing, also known as open-wheel racing in North America, is any of several forms of open-wheeled single-seater motorsport. A "formula", first devised by FIA for its post–World War II single-seater races, is a set of regulations for a given type of car. The best known are Formula One, Formula E, Formula Two, Formula Three, regional Formula Three and Formula Four. Common usage of "formula racing" encompasses other single-seater series, including the IndyCar Series and the Super Formula Championship.

Lower categories such as Formula Three and Formula Two are described as junior formulae, lower formulae, or feeder formulae, referring to their position below top-level series like Formula One on their respective career ladders of single-seater motor racing. There are two primary forms of racing formula: open formula, which allows a choice of chassis or engines; and control or "spec" formula, which specifies a single supplier for chassis and engines. Formula Three is an example of an open formula, while Formula BMW is a control formula. Exceptions include Formula Ford, which has an open chassis formula but a single-brand engine formula.

While Formula One is the most expensive form of motorsport in the world, not all formula series are high-cost professional events. Some formulas are intended for juniors and amateurs; Formula 1000 and Formula Vee are among the least expensive forms of circuit racing.

Most contemporary formula categories allow the use of racing slicks, and extensive use of wings and ground effects to increase cornering speeds. However, there are popular amateur categories such as Formula Ford and Formula Vee which do not, and consequently have much slower cornering speeds and in which “drafting” plays a much more important role. Occasionally the term “wings and slicks racing” is used to distinguish the faster categories.

== World championships ==
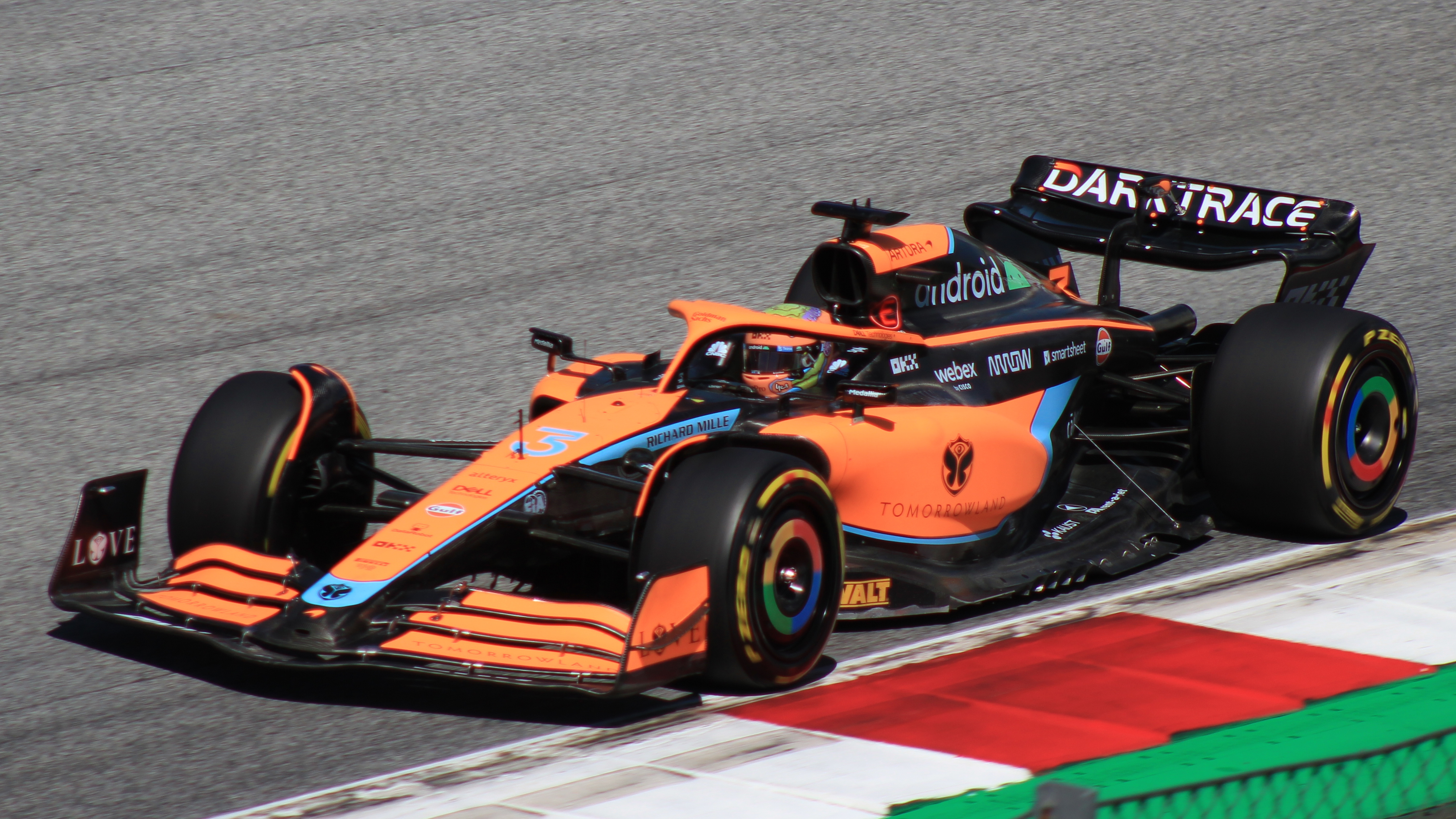
Daniel Ricciardo during the 2022 Austrian Grand Prix

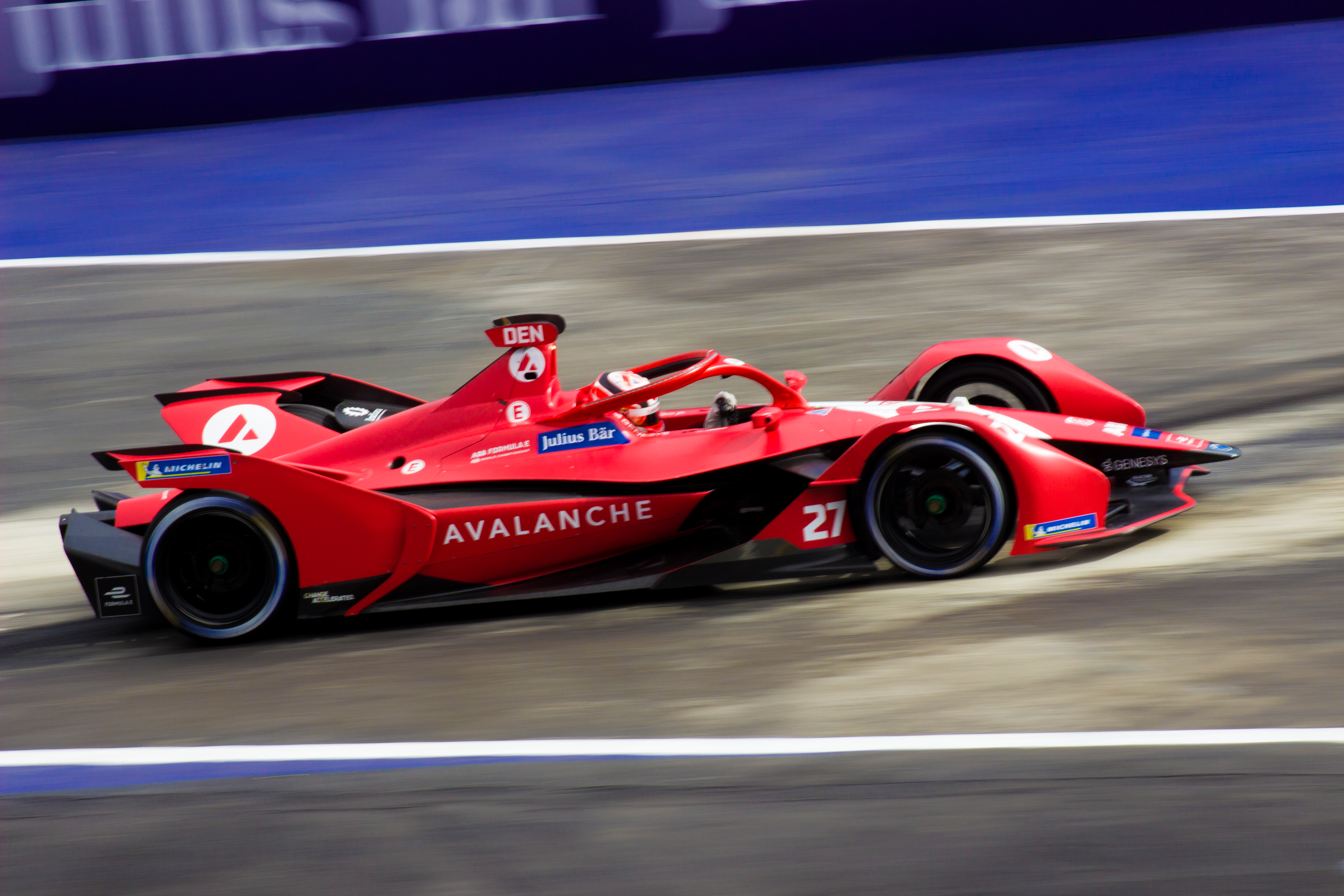
Jake Dennis driving a Gen2 Formula E car at the 2022 Mexico City ePrix

=== Formula One ===
While reviving Grand Prix racing after World War II, the Fédération Internationale de l'Automobile's Commission Sportive Internationale defined the standardised regulations of Formula One (F1) in 1946. The first race to be run to the early Formula One regulations was a non-championship Grand Prix in Turin in September 1946. The first officially recognised Formula One season was held in 1947 and the World Championship for Drivers was inaugurated in 1950.

=== Formula E ===
Formula E is the highest class of competition for single-seat, electrically powered racing cars, which held its inaugural season in 2014–15. Conceived in 2012, the championship was intended by the FIA to serve as an R&D platform for the electric vehicle and promote interest in EVs and sustainability. The series races predominately on temporary circuits in cities such as New York, Hong Kong, Zürich, Berlin, Rome, and Paris in events known as "ePrix". In order to cap costs but maintain technological development, the series uses a spec chassis and battery that must be used by all entrants, with competing teams permitted to design and build their own motors, inverter and rear suspension. The series has gained traction in recent years.

== International championships ==
=== Formula 2 ===
The FIA Formula 2 Championship was introduced in 2017 by Bernie Ecclestone and Flavio Briatore following the rebranding of the long-term F1 feeder series – GP2 Series. Designed to make racing affordable and to make it the perfect training ground for life in F1, F2 has made it mandatory for all of the teams to use the same chassis, engine, and tyre supplier.

=== Formula 3 ===
In 2019, the GP3 Series was replaced by international Formula 3, just in the same way that GP2 was rebranded as Formula 2 in 2017. The series' first drivers' champion was Robert Shwartzman driving for Prema Racing, who also won the teams' championship that year. Before 2024, the FIA Formula 3 World Cup took place at the end of the season at the Macau Grand Prix. However, due to various reasons, it has been discontinued. Formula Regional category cars have raced in place of Formula 3 cars at the Macau Grand Prix since then.

== Regional championships ==
=== Formula Regional ===
Formula Regional is the last category that takes place outside the F1 events format. It was created to take over from the various F3 championships around the world after the FIA deemed that the title "Formula 3" would be exclusively used by the series that runs on F1 weekends known previously as GP3. Each championship corresponds to one specific region: Asia, Americas, Europe, India, Japan, Middle East and Oceania (New Zealand).

== National championships ==
=== Formula 4 ===
FIA Formula 4, also called FIA F4, is an open-wheel racing car category intended for junior drivers. There is no global championship, but rather individual nations or regions can host their own championships in compliance with a universal set of rules and specifications. The category was created by the Fédération Internationale de l'Automobile (FIA)—the International sanctioning and administrative body for motorsport—as an entry-level category for young drivers, bridging the gap between karting and Formula 3. The series is a part of the FIA Global Pathway.

== North America ==
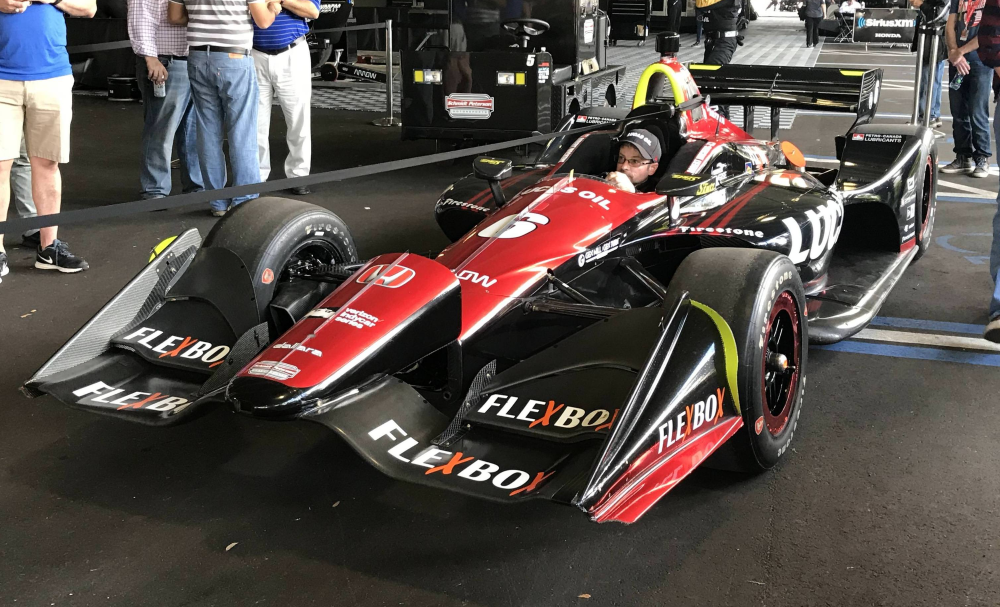
Robert Wickens car before the 2018 Firestone Grand Prix of St. Petersburg

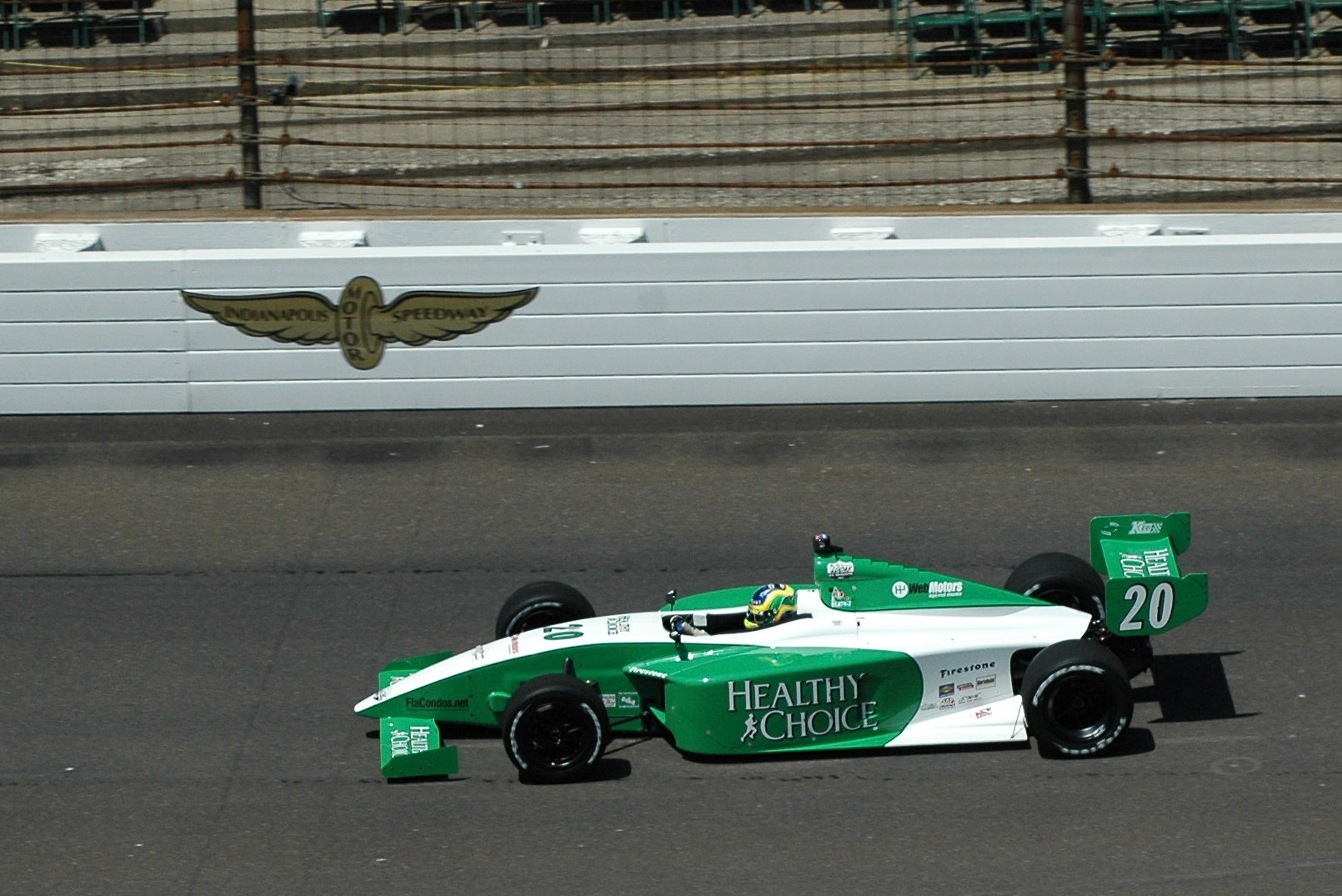
Ana Beatriz during the 2008 Freedom 100 Indy Lights race at Indianapolis Motor Speedway

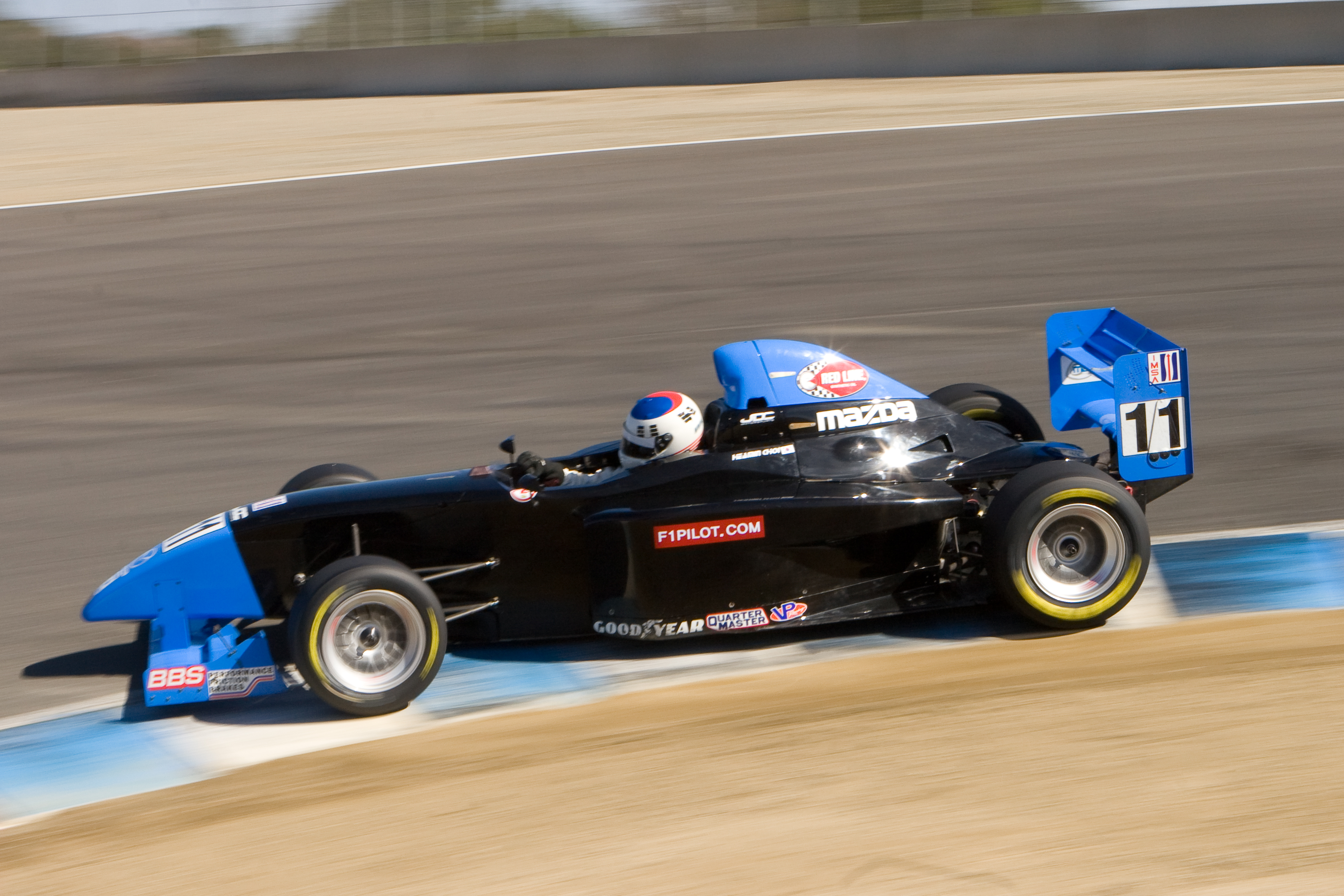
Heamin Choi during the 2009 Pro Mazda race at Mazda Raceway Laguna Seca

=== IndyCar Series ===
The IndyCar Series is the premier level of formula racing in North America. The sport, in general, traces its roots as far back as 1905. The current series, founded by then-Indianapolis Motor Speedway CEO Tony George, began in 1996 as the "Indy Racing League" (IRL). In 2008, the series merged with the rival Champ Car World Series, formerly known as CART, to form the IndyCar Series. A typical IndyCar season contains races on a mixture of natural terrain road courses, temporary street circuits, small ovals (also known as short tracks), and larger, high-speed ovals (also known as superspeedways); including the historic Indianapolis 500.

=== Indy NXT ===
Indy NXT, previously known as Indy Lights, is the top feeder series for the IndyCar Series, similar to F1's relationship with Formula 2. The original Indy Lights (known as "American Racing Series") acted as a developmental circuit for CART from 1986 to 2001. The current series was founded in 2002 by IndyCar.

=== USF Pro 2000 Championship ===
The USF Pro 2000 Championship formally known as Indy Pro 2000 Championship has been an officially sanctioned development series since 2011, when it became governed by IndyCar, although the original series started in 1991 as the Star Mazda Championship. Drivers currently use Tatuus IP-22 cars.

=== USF2000 Championship ===
The USF2000 Championship formally known as U.S. F2000 National Championship is an American variation of the Formula Ford. The series was initially founded by Dan Andersen and Mike Foschi in 1990 and regularly fielded over 60 entries per race. In 2001, the series was sold to Jon Baytos who introduced a number of controversial rule changes that brought the series out of alignment with similar SCCA classes, which led to a reduction in participation and the end of the series in 2006. In 2010, the series returned under the leadership of Andersen with the intent to return F2000 to its status as a feeder formula for higher open wheel racing classes in the United States.

=== USF Juniors ===
The USF Juniors is a new addition to the Road to Indy pathway, sanctioned by USAC in 2022, it is the equivalent to Formula 4.

== Japan ==
=== Super Formula ===
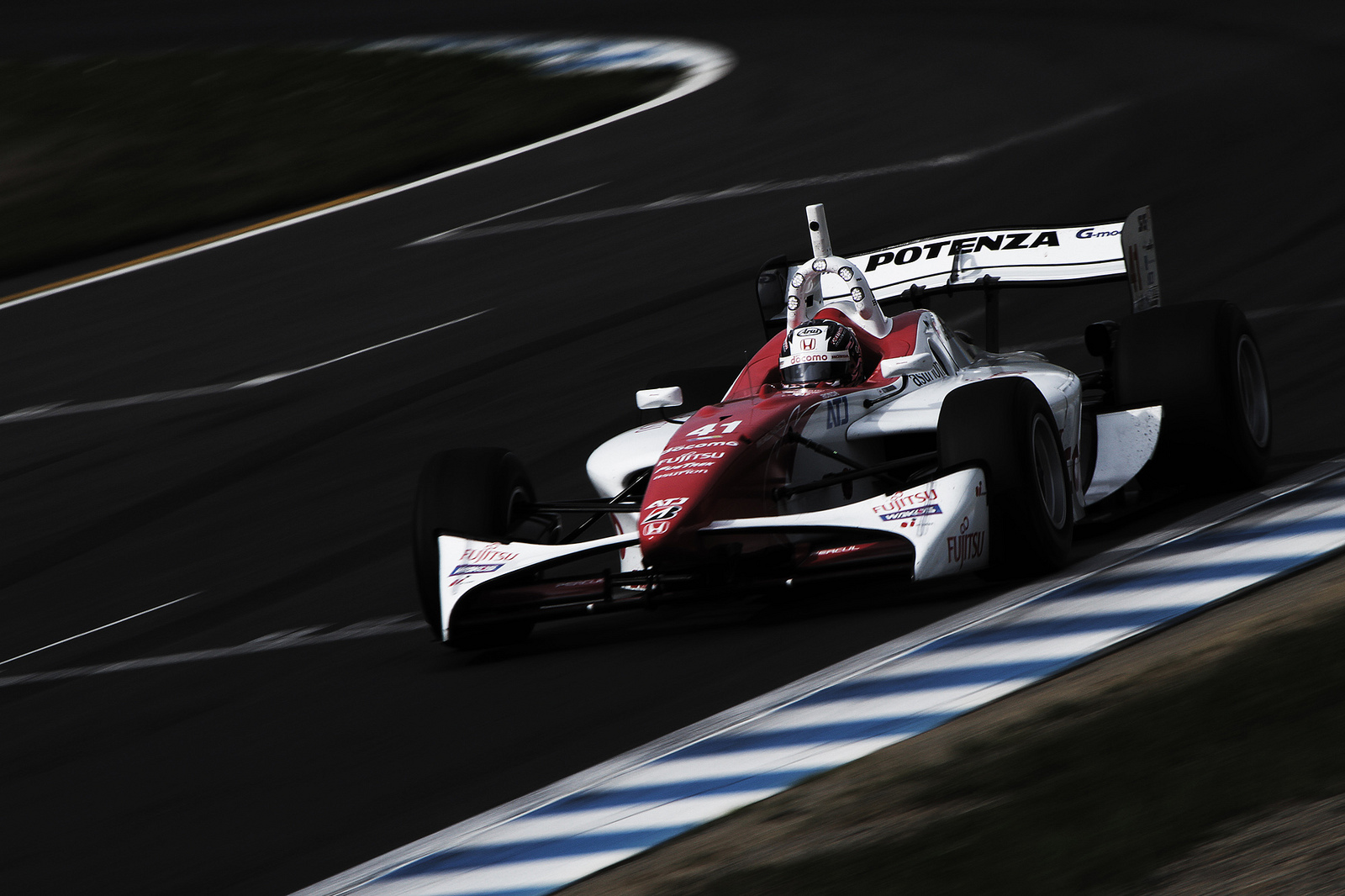
Koudai Tsukakoshi during the 2012 Formula Nippon race at Twin Ring Motegi

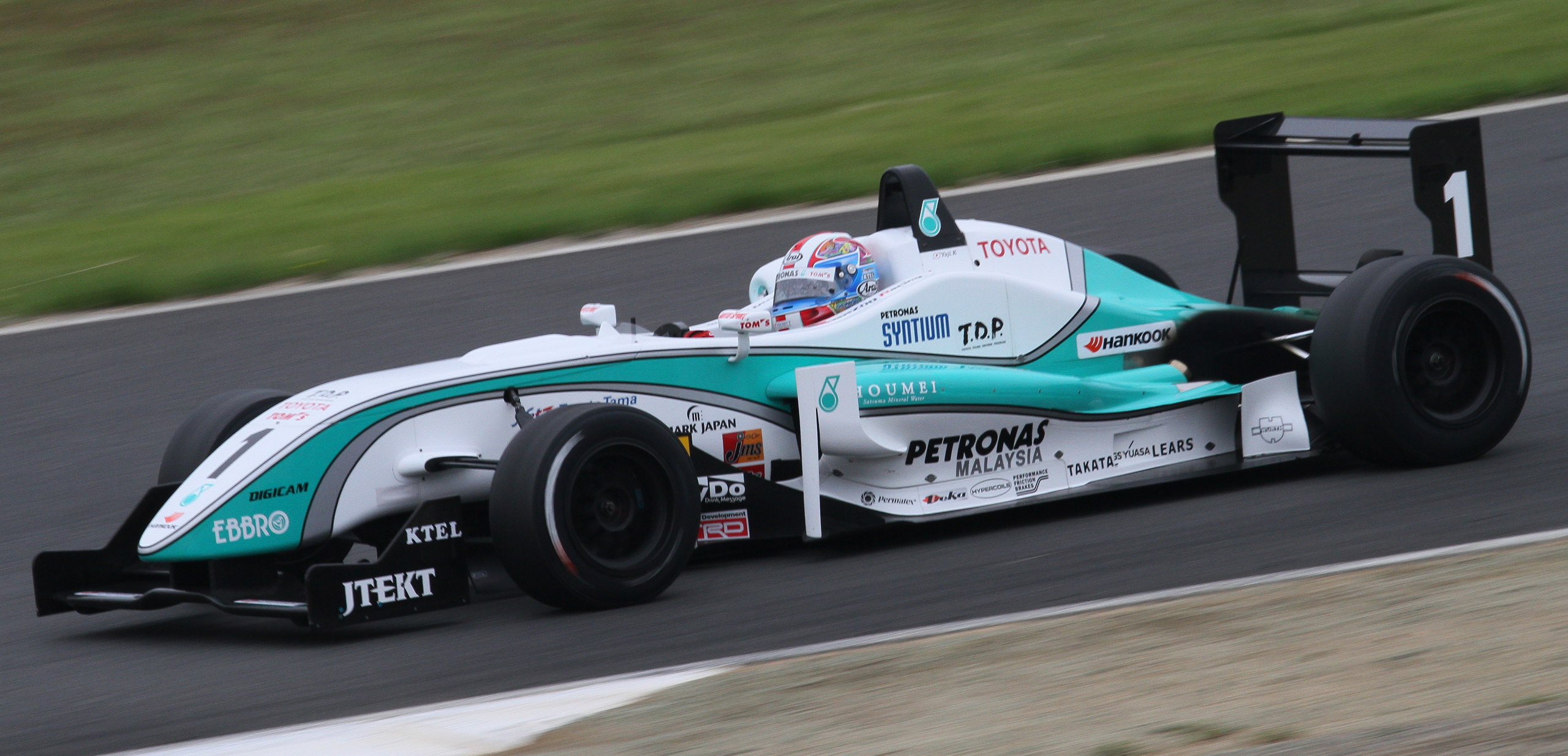
Yuji Kunimoto during the 2010 All-Japan F3 race at Twin Ring Motegi

Super Formula, previously known as Formula Nippon, is the premier level of Japanese formula racing. It began as the Japanese Formula 2000 series in 1973 and continued to use Formula Two regulations after European Formula Two had ended in 1984. In 1987 the series switched to the Formula 3000 standard so that Japanese and European regulations paralleled one another again. However, in 1996, the International Formula 3000 series became a one-make format to reduce costs and the Japanese Formula broke away, changing the series' name to Formula Nippon. Formula Nippon featured chassis supplied by Lola, Reynard and G-Force until 2001 and 2002 when G-Force and Reynard withdrew, while Mugen-Honda supplied most engines. In 2006, the regulations were changed drastically – the chassis was replaced and engines were now provided by Toyota and Honda. The engines had the same specifications as those used in the 2005 IndyCar Series.

== Other formula series ==
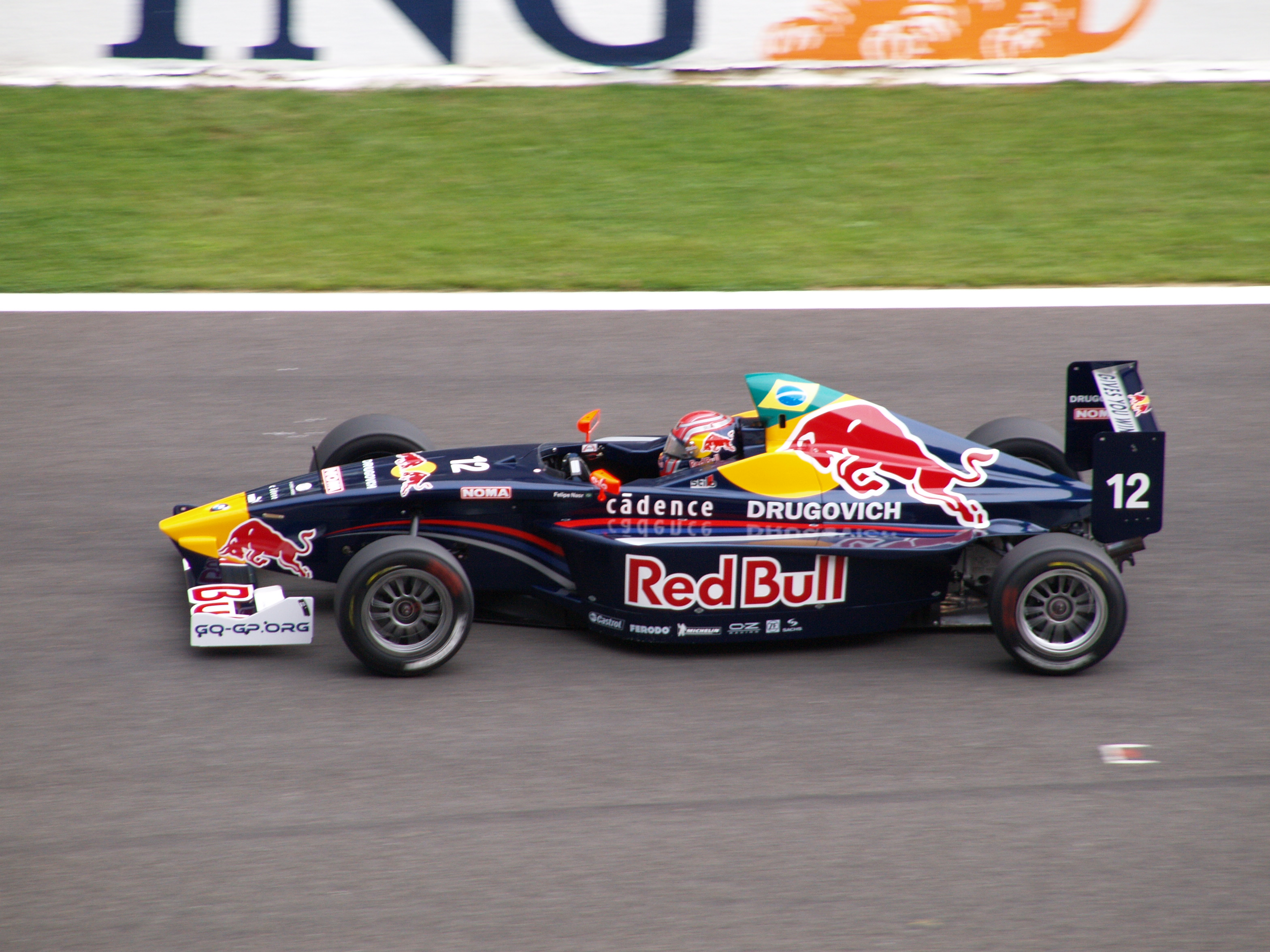
Felipe Nasr during the 2009 Formula BMW race at Spa-Francorchamps

- Euroformula Open Championship
- F1 Academy
- F1 in Schools
- Formula 1000
- Formula Continental
- Formula Ford
- Formula LGB Hyundai
- Formula LGB Swift
- Formula SCCA
- Formula Student
- Formula Vee
- Formula Woman
- GB3 Championship
- Masters Historic Formula One Championship
- Monoposto Racing Club
- S5000 Australian Drivers' Championship
- Toyota Racing Series

== Defunct series ==
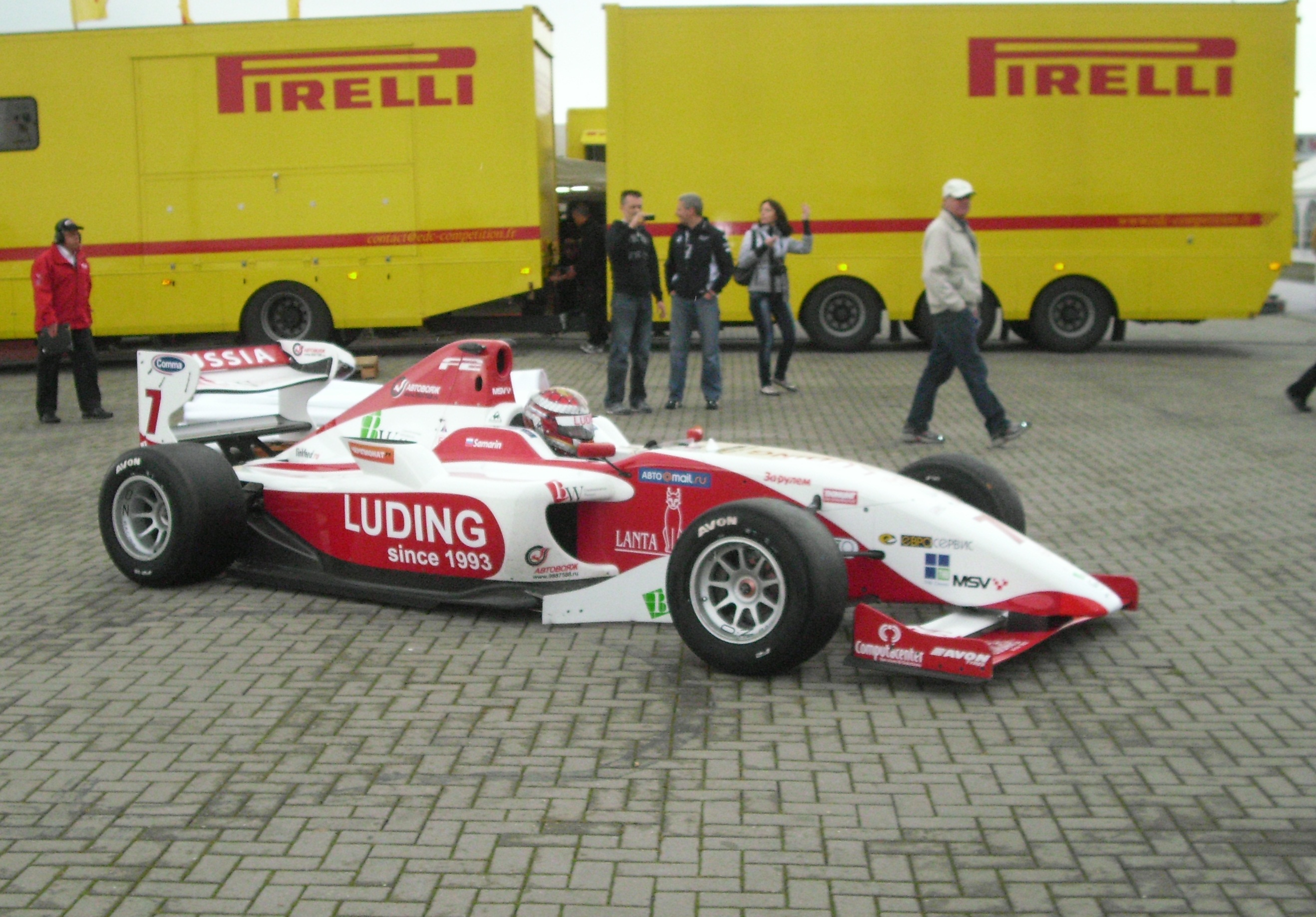
Ivan Samarin in his 2010 Formula Two car

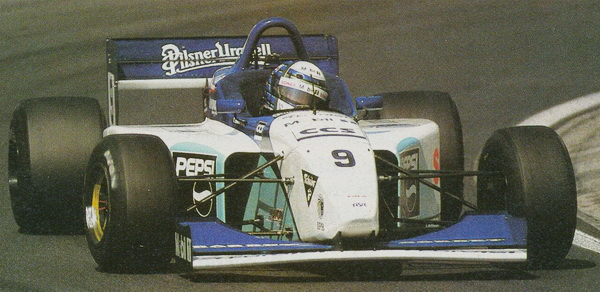
Tomáš Enge driving a 1998 International Formula 3000 car

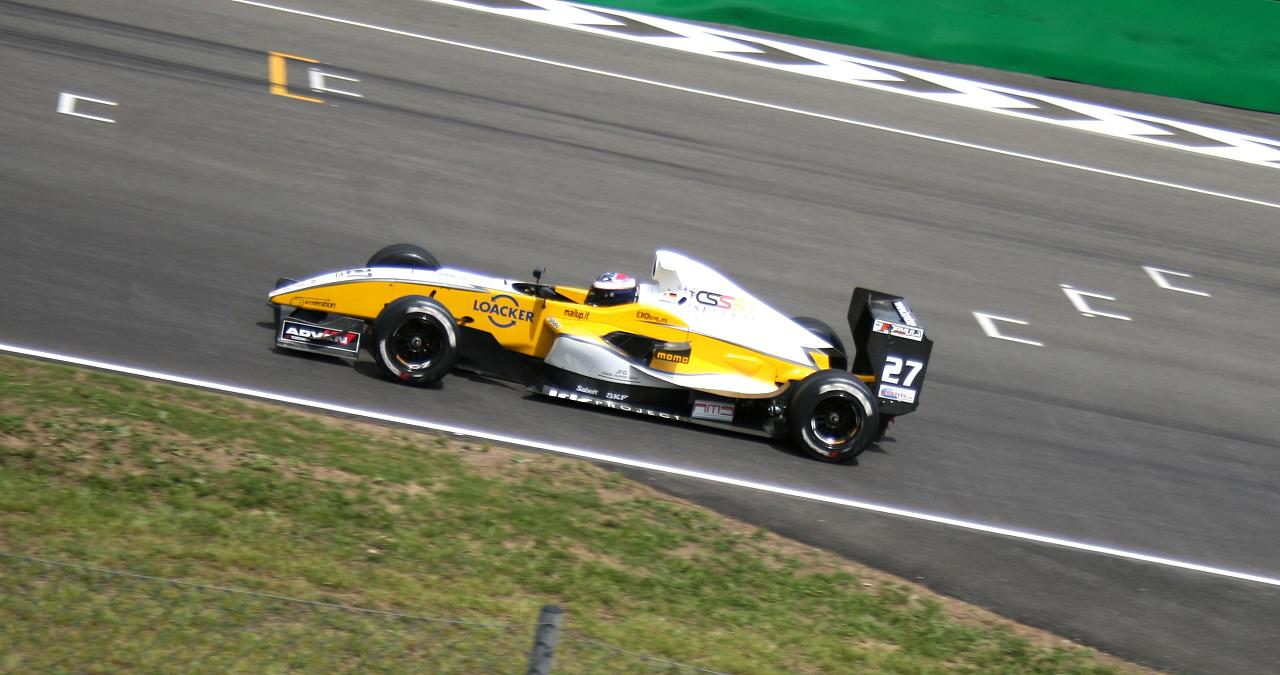
Michael Ammermüller during a 2008 International Formula Master race

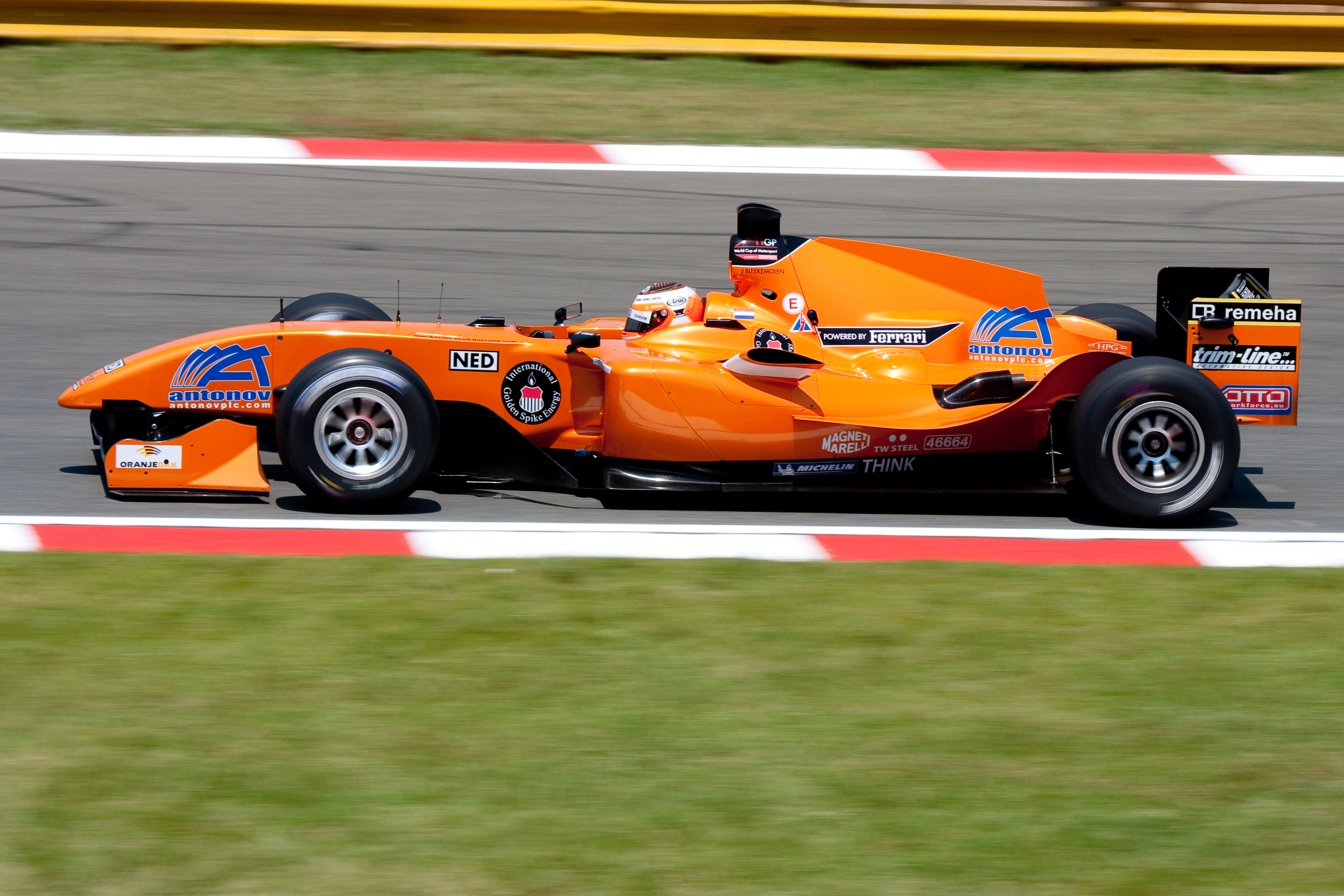
Team The Netherlands during the 2009 A1 Grand Prix at Kyalami

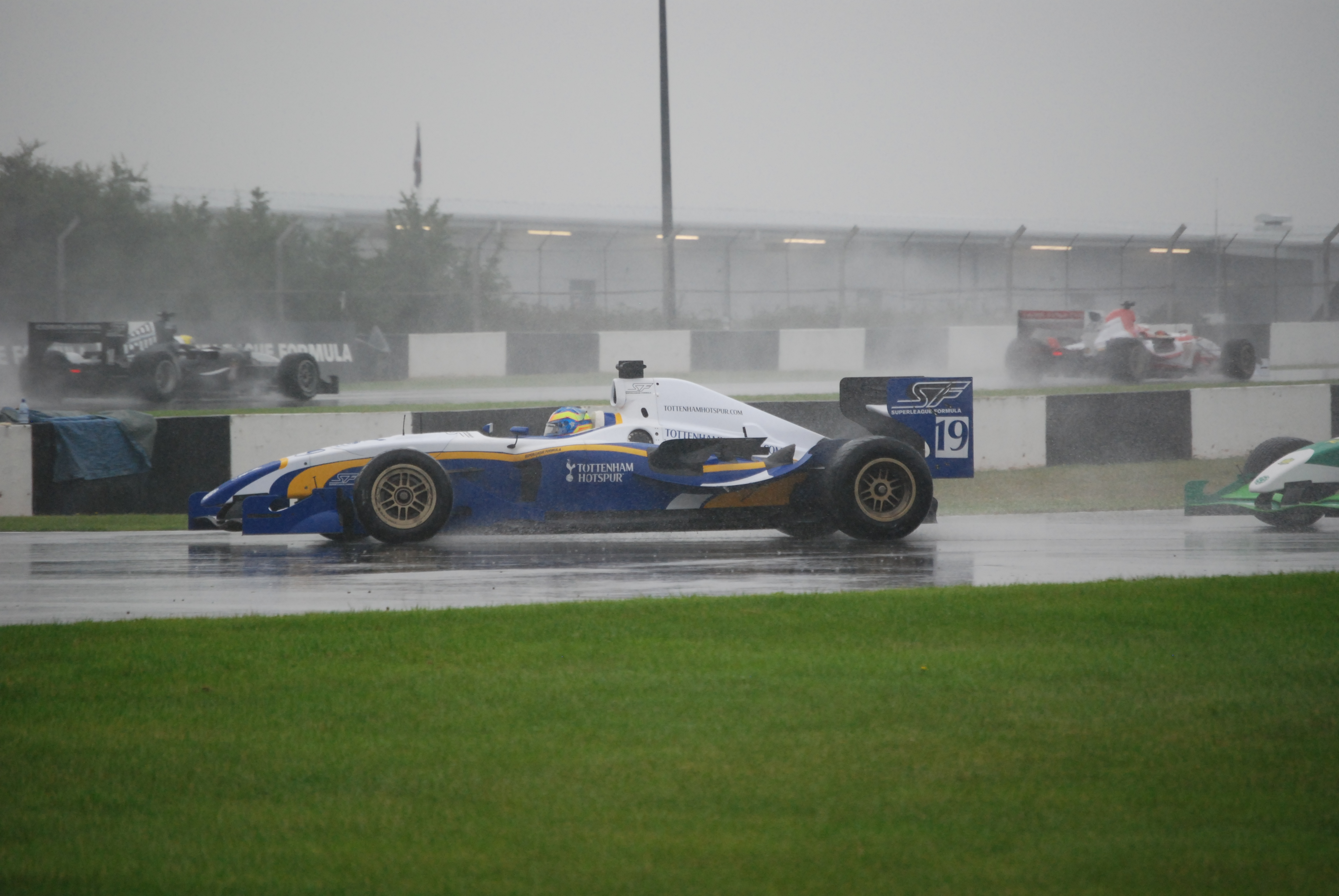
Tottenham Hotspur during the 2008 Superleague Formula race at Donington Park

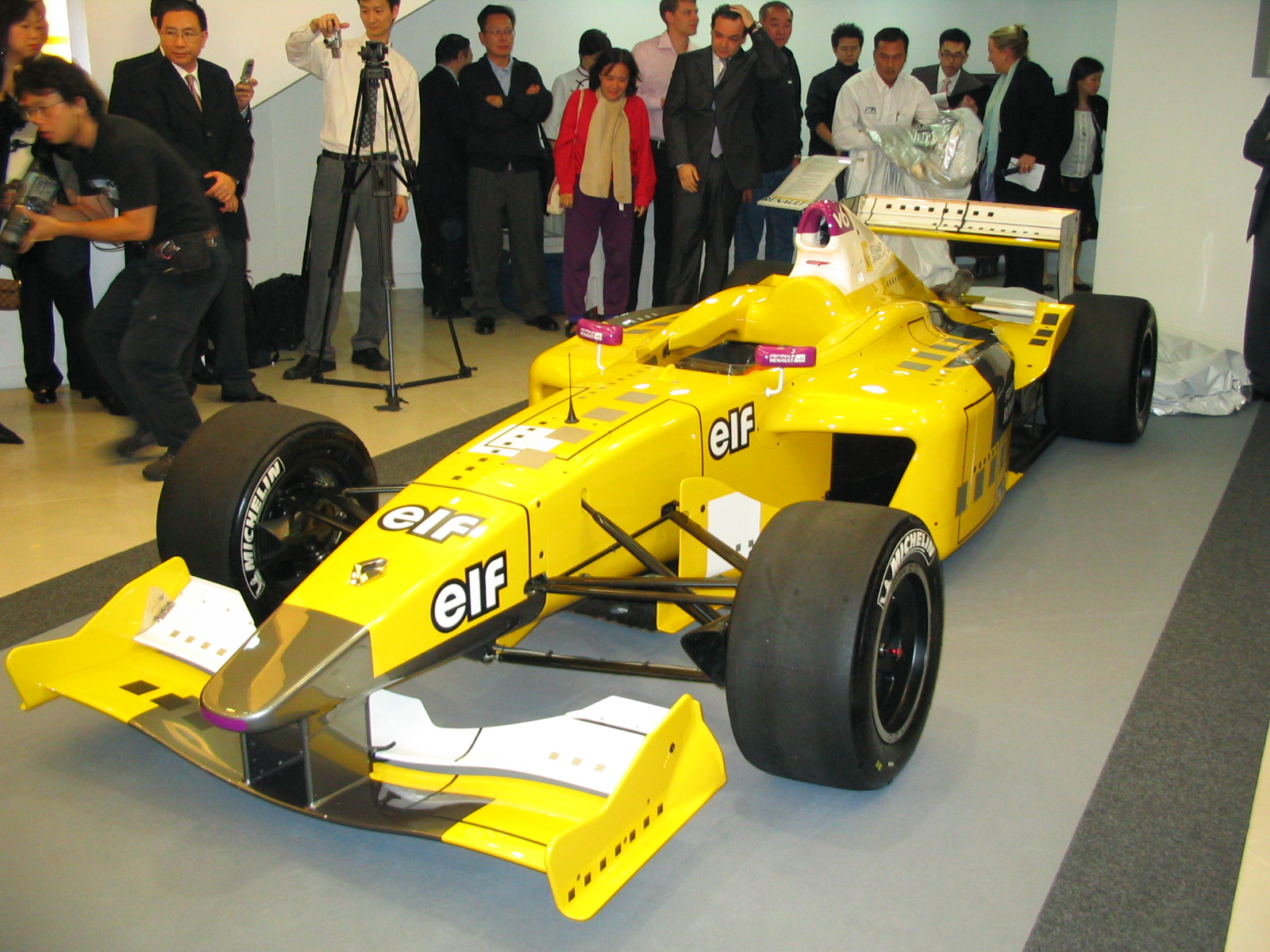
Formula Asia V6 launch event in Hong Kong in 2006

Formula series from the 21st century that could be categorised between Tier 1 and Tier 5 (see top of page), but are now defunct, are described below.

=== Formula Two (1947–1985; 2009–2012) ===
The Formula Two regulations were first defined in 1947 as a form of B-class below Formula One. It was not unusual for some Formula One events to include a number of F2 entries in the same field and the entries in the World Championship seasons of 1952–53 comprised exclusively F2 cars for reasons of cost. F2 had a patchy history until the inauguration of the European Formula Two Championship in 1967. F2 was an open formula that allowed the use of any chassis that met the prescribed regulations; it was well supported during the 1970s, with chassis from Tecno, March Engineering, Toleman, Ralt, Matra and others. The European championship ran continually until the creation of its successor, Formula 3000, in 1985. In 2008 it was announced by the FIA that Formula Two would return in 2009 in the form of the FIA Formula Two Championship. This series was discontinued after the 2012 season.

=== Formula 3000 (1985–2004) ===
The Formula 3000 was created by the Fédération Internationale de l'Automobile in 1985 to become the final step for drivers before entering Formula One. Formula Two had become too expensive and was dominated by works-run cars with factory engines. Formula 3000 offered quicker, cheaper, more open racing. The series began as an open formula, but in 1986 tyres were standardized, followed by engines and chassis in 1996. The series ran until 2004 and was replaced in 2005 by the GP2 Series.

=== Formula 5000 (1968–1982) ===
Formula 5000 (or F5000) was an open wheel, single seater auto-racing formula that ran in different series in various regions around the world from 1968 to 1982. It was originally intended as a low-cost series aimed at open-wheel racing cars that no longer fit into any particular formula. The '5000' denomination comes from the maximum 5.0 litre engine capacity allowed in the cars, although many cars ran with smaller engines.

=== International Formula Master (2005–2009) ===
International Formula Master, a.k.a. Formula Super 2000, was conceived as a competitor for Formula Three. It started in 2005 as the 3000 Pro Series, organised by Peroni Promotion. MTC Organisation took over in 2006 and turned it into a support series for the WTCC. Drivers used second-hand Formula 2000 cars made by Tatuus that were powered by a 250 hp Honda K20A engine.

=== A1 Grand Prix (2005–2009) ===
A1 Grand Prix (A1GP) was unique in its field in that competitors solely represented their nation as opposed to themselves or a team, the usual format in most formula racing series. As such, it was often promoted as the "World Cup of Motorsport". Also, the series attracted equal numbers of (former or future) Formula One drivers and IndyCar Series drivers. The concept was founded by Sheikh Al Maktoum of Dubai in 2004, but sold to the FIA in 2005. The races were held in the traditional Formula One off-season, the northern hemisphere winter. Between 2005 and 2009 29 countries from five continents participated.

=== Superleague Formula (2008–2011) ===
Using 750 hp V12 engines, Superleague Formula introduced team sponsorship by association football clubs. In qualifying, the link with football was also present as the series employed a system based on a group stage to knock-out format used in some football tournaments. Another unique feature of Superleague Formula was the Super Final, a five-lap shootout between the six best drivers of a weekend. In 2010, the series offered the biggest prize fund in European motorsport with the champion set to earn €1 million. In theory, it would be possible for a driver to earn up to €2.2 million over the course of the season. This was all done to give drivers a chance to earn a living from motorsport. By 2011, the link with football was fading with more than half the teams no longer associated with football teams, The later races of the season did not take place, and no further seasons were organised.

=== Formula Dream (1999–2005) ===
See: Formula Challenge Japan

=== Formula V6 Asia (2006–2009) ===
Formula Asia V6 (Renault) was launched in 2006 to give Southeast Asian-based drivers a chance to progress from karting through junior single-seaters to international motorsport. Karun Chandhok, for example, won the 2006 championship and was rewarded with a test in a World Series by Renault car at Paul Ricard. Drivers ran with Tatuus chassis, a Renault 3.5L V6 engine and Michelin tyres.

=== Auto GP (1999) ===
The Auto GP World Series' roots can be traced back to 1999 and the Italian Formula 3000 series. At first, nearly all races were held in Italy, but the series expanded throughout Europe quickly. In 2001 the series became European Formula 3000 and in 2004 Superfund became the title sponsor, planning to set up the Formula Superfund series. However, the funding was pulled and the series was cancelled. Therefore, Coloni Motorsport re-established the Italian Formula 3000 and expanded this in 2006 to the Euroseries 3000. In 2010, the first-generation A1 Grand Prix cars replaced the Lola F3000 chassis and the Auto GP name was adopted.

=== Others ===
- Atlantic Championship
- ADAC Formel Masters
- China Formula Grand Prix
- EuroBOSS Series
- Florida Winter Series
- ADAC Formula 4
- Formula Atlantic
- Formula Acceleration 1
- Formula BMW
- Formula Holden
- Formula Masters China
- Formula Renault
- Formula Volkswagen South Africa Championship
- W Series

== See also ==
- Open-wheel car
