= JK Tyre National Racing Championship =

Racing championship

- Category: Open-wheel racing, Saloon Car Racing
- Country: India
- Inaugural season: 1997
- Drivers: 76
- Teams: 15
- Constructors: Super Speeds
- Tire suppliers: JK Tyre
- Official website: www.jktyremotorsport.com

The JK Tyre National Racing Championship also known as JK-NRC is an auto racing championship series consisting of several one-make series events of open wheel single seater formula cars and saloon cars in India. This championship series is also considered to be the stepping stone for Indian Racing drivers who want to leap into international motorsports. Several drivers have gone on to take part in international events including Formula One and A1 Grand Prix and other premier racing series around the world.

== Classes ==
- Formula LGB Swift
- Formula Rolon
- Suzuki Gixxer Cup
- Super Saloon
- Jr. Touring Car

== Teams ==
- Performance racing India
- Bigfoot Racing Coimbatore
- FRK Racing
- Prime Racing
- Rad Racing
- Team Game over
- Chettinad Motorsport
- Tiger Sport
- Dark Don Racing
- Avalanche Motorsports
- Ahura Racing
- Momentum Motorsports

== National Level Drivers ==
- Aditya Akkineni
- Ajay Kini
- Akhil Devrag
- Akhil Kushlani
- Akhil Rabindra
- Ajith Kumar
- Akash Gowda
- Ameya Walavalkar
- Amer Beg
- Amittrajit Ghosh
- Alisha Abdullah
- Anand Prasad
- Angad
- Anindith Reddy
- Armaan Ebrahim
- Arjun Balu
- Ashwin Sunder
- Audumber Hede
- Balavijay
- Chittesh Mandody
- Deepak Chinnapa
- Diana Pundole
- Diljith T S
- Faahad Kutty
- Fazal Khan
- Ganpat Amarnath
- Gautam Maini
- Gaurav Dalal
- Gaurav Gill
- Gokul Krishna
- Gurunath Meiyappan
- Gurniaaz Mann
- Jagat Nanjappa
- J D Madan
- Jamie Jamshed Shaw
- Kartik Shankar
- Karun Chandhok
- Lee Keshav
- Mihir Dharker
- Mira Erda
- Mohit Aryan
- Munjal Salva
- Nayan Chatterjee
- Niranjan
- Omkar Paradkar
- Oshan Kothadiya
- Parth Ghorpade
- Parthiva Sureshwaran
- Prayanshu Taliyan
- Prashanth Krishnamoorthy
- Prithveen Rajan
- Rahil Noorani
- Rajvirdhan
- Ram Narayan
- Rayomand Banajee
- Saahil Shelar
- Saif Mir
- Sailesh Bolisetti
- Sanjay Balu
- Sandeep Kumar
- Saran Vikram
- Saran Vikram Tmars
- Sarosh Hataria
- Saurav Bandopadhyay
- Shankar Narayan
- Siddharth Kishore
- Steve Hodges
- Sudarshan Rao
- Sudanand Rajan
- Varun Nathwani
- Vidyuth Iyer
- Vijay Kumar D
- Vishnu Prasad
- Yash Aradhya

== Related ==
- JK Racing Asia Series
- Formula Maruti
- Formula LGB Swift
- Formula LGB Hyundai
- Formula Rolon
