= 2022–23 MRF Formula 2000 season =

Auto racing championship in India

The 2022–23 MRF Formula 2000 season was the eighth running of a Formula 2000-level single-seater championship in India. Previously known as the MRF Challenge, it was last held up until early 2020, before being cancelled for two seasons because of the COVID-19 pandemic. For the 2022–23 season, it was restarted without support of the FIA and simply called MRF Formula 2000, with the field consisting of domestic drivers rather than foreign racers competing over the European and Northern American off-season.

The season began on 8 October 2022 and was run over four weekends until January 2023. Sai Sanjay won the championship after taking eight podiums in twelve races.

== Drivers ==
The following drivers contested the championship:

No.	Driver	Rounds
1	(India) Chetan Korada	2–4
10	(India) Arya Singh	3–4
11	(India) Shahan Ali Mohsin	1
17	(India) Yash Aradhya	1
24	(India) Sohil Shah	3–4
26	(India) Rishon Rajeev	1
33	(India) Sai Sanjay	All
36	(India) Chirag Ghorpade	All
43	(India) Dillion Zachariah	2
54	(India) Dillion Zachariah	1, 3–4
45	(India) Mohamed Ryan	All
55	(India) Divy Nandan	All
70	(United Arab Emirates) Kyle Kumaran	1–2

== Calendar and results ==
After a two-year hiatus, the calendar featured no events abroad India and consisted only of races held at Madras Motor Race Track. The second race of each weekend saw the top eight finishers of race one start in reverse order. As the last race of the first event had to be cancelled because of heavy rain, a fourth race was added to the second round. This fourth race, however, was postponed to the third round when the race weekend was stopped out of respect after a crash during a Saloon Car race resulted in the death of a competitor. The original calendar was supposed to consist of three events, but a fourth event was added later on.

Round		Circuit	Date	Pole position	Fastest lap	Winning driver	Support bill
2022
1	R1	(India) Madras Motor Race Track, Chennai	8 October	(India) Rishon Rajeev	(India) Sai Sanjay	(India) Sai Sanjay	Formula LGB 1300; Indian Touring Car National Championship; MRF Saloon Cars; MRF Super Stock Cars
1	R2	(India) Madras Motor Race Track, Chennai	9 October		(India) Chirag Ghorpade	(India) Chirag Ghorpade	Formula LGB 1300; Indian Touring Car National Championship; MRF Saloon Cars; MRF Super Stock Cars
1	R3	(India) Madras Motor Race Track, Chennai	9 October	cancelled due to heavy rain			Formula LGB 1300; Indian Touring Car National Championship; MRF Saloon Cars; MRF Super Stock Cars
2023
2	R1	(India) Madras Motor Race Track, Chennai	7 January	(India) Sai Sanjay	(India) Mohamed Ryan	(India) Divy Nandan	Formula LGB 1300; Indian Touring Car National Championship; MRF Saloon Cars; MRF Super Stock Cars
2	R2	(India) Madras Motor Race Track, Chennai	7 January		(India) Sai Sanjay	(India) Sai Sanjay	Formula LGB 1300; Indian Touring Car National Championship; MRF Saloon Cars; MRF Super Stock Cars
2	R3	(India) Madras Motor Race Track, Chennai	8 January		(India) Chirag Ghorpade	(India) Chirag Ghorpade	Formula LGB 1300; Indian Touring Car National Championship; MRF Saloon Cars; MRF Super Stock Cars
2	R4	(India) Madras Motor Race Track, Chennai	8 January	cancelled due to a fatal crash in another race			Formula LGB 1300; Indian Touring Car National Championship; MRF Saloon Cars; MRF Super Stock Cars
3	R1	(India) Madras Motor Race Track, Chennai	21 January	(India) Sohil Shah	(India) Sohil Shah	(India) Sohil Shah	Formula LGB 1300; Indian Touring Car National Championship; MRF Saloon Cars; MRF Super Stock Cars; VW Polo Cup
3	R2	(India) Madras Motor Race Track, Chennai	22 January		(India) Sohil Shah	(India) Dillon Zachariah	Formula LGB 1300; Indian Touring Car National Championship; MRF Saloon Cars; MRF Super Stock Cars; VW Polo Cup
3	R3	(India) Madras Motor Race Track, Chennai	22 January		(India) Sohil Shah	(India) Mohammed Ryan	Formula LGB 1300; Indian Touring Car National Championship; MRF Saloon Cars; MRF Super Stock Cars; VW Polo Cup
3	R4	(India) Madras Motor Race Track, Chennai	22 January		(India) Sohil Shah	(India) Sai Sanjay	Formula LGB 1300; Indian Touring Car National Championship; MRF Saloon Cars; MRF Super Stock Cars; VW Polo Cup
4	R1	(India) Madras Motor Race Track, Chennai	28 January	(India) Sohil Shah	(India) Sohil Shah	(India) Sohil Shah	Formula LGB 1300; Indian Touring Car National Championship; MRF Saloon Cars; MRF Super Stock Cars; VW Polo Cup
4	R2	(India) Madras Motor Race Track, Chennai	29 January		(India) Sohil Shah	(India) Sohil Shah	Formula LGB 1300; Indian Touring Car National Championship; MRF Saloon Cars; MRF Super Stock Cars; VW Polo Cup
4	R3	(India) Madras Motor Race Track, Chennai	29 January		(India) Sohil Shah	(India) Sohil Shah	Formula LGB 1300; Indian Touring Car National Championship; MRF Saloon Cars; MRF Super Stock Cars; VW Polo Cup

== Season report ==
After the 2019–20 MRF Challenge ended in February of 2020, there was practically no communication by any promoter or governing body about the future of the category in India for over two years. This changed when it made a surprising return as part of the Indian National Car Racing Championship in early October of 2022, albeit without FIA support and not under the MRF Challenge moniker.

Nine drivers took part in the opening round of the series simply called MRF F2000. Rishon Rajeev claimed pole for the first race, but he had a bad start and was overtaken by eventual race winner Sai Sanjay, as well as Shahan Ali Mohsin and Yash Aradhya, who formed the rest of the podium. Reverse-grid polesitter Mohamed Ryan also struggled at the start of race two, allowing Chirag Ghorpade to claim the lead. Divy Nandan then made a mistake in third, bringing out a safety car. Ryan came under attack from behind him at the restart, eventually losing out to multiple drivers in the final stages of the race. He ended up finishing sixth, with Rishon Rajeev and Dillion Zachariah claiming the podium spots behind Gorpade. Race three was cancelled when a heavy rain storm hit the circuit, ending the weekend with Sanjay four points ahead of Ghorpade.

Championship leader Sanjay topped qualifying this time, but once again pole was not the place to be, as he fell behind Divy Nandan and Ryan. This order would stay the same until the end of the race. The reversed grid for race two saw Ghorpade on pole, but he stalled. This gifted Chetan Korada the lead, before he got a drive-through penalty and Sanjay, who had fought his way up the order after starting fourth, inherited first place. He won the race, ahead of Ghorpade and Nandan. Sanjay was then on pole for the third race, while Nandan mistakenly lined up at the back of the grid instead of next to him. Still, Sanjay could not hold the lead, as he was passed by Ghorpade and had to be content with second place. Ryan completed the podium. The second round then also came to an early end, when the final race was cancelled after saloon driver K.E. Kumar died after a crash in another race. Sanjay remained in the lead of the championship, growing his advantage to eleven points.

Round three saw newcomer Sohil Shah qualify on pole, and this time pole was finally converted to victory as he led Ryan and Sanjay home in a lights-to-flag drive. Zachariah started the reversed grid race two from the front, and once again no one was able to get past the poleman. Ghorpade alongside him was less fortunate and dropped back during the race, leaving Nandan and Ryan to pick up the remaining two podium places. Shah was then on pole for race three, courtesy of the fastest second-best qualifying lap, but Ryan had a brilliant start that catapulted him from fourth into the lead by turn one. A safety car and subsequent restart also could not trouble him, as he led home Shah and Nandan to win. Finally, a race to replace the washed out third race of round one could be held, and Sanjay won that race by over seven seconds ahead of Shah and Zachariah. With Ghorpade off the pace all weekend, Sanjay was able to grow his points lead to 28 points, now ahead of Ryan and Zachariah.

Shah continued his one-lap pace into the final round, that was only announced to happen after the third round had finished. Race one was rather reminiscent of the round before, with Shah converting another pole into an unchallenged victory. Sanjay came home second ahead of Nandan. The reversed grid race was where Shah showed all of his prowess, starting in seventh and last place and climbing through the field to win the race. Ryan and Zachariah completed the podium, while Sanjay cruised to a fourth place that was enough to secure his championship title. The last race was another lights-to-flag win by Shah, completing a clean weekend sweep and also securing third in the standings. Sanjay and Korada closed their seasons with another podium finish.

Sai Sanjay won three races but was consistent enough to win the title. The championship picture might have looked very different had Shah done the whole season or maybe not. With the organizers stating that there are plans to revive the MRF Challenge in the next years, a return to an official FIA series will hopefully bring back the interest of international entries and races at multiple venues.

== Championship standings ==
Scoring system

Position	1st	2nd	3rd	4th	5th	6th	7th	8th	9th	10th
Points	25	18	15	12	10	8	6	4	2	1

Drivers' standings

Pos.	Driver	CHE1 (India)			CHE2 (India)				CHE3 (India)				CHE4 (India)			Points
1	(India) Sai Sanjay	1	5	C	3	1	2	C	3	6	4	1	2	4	2	201
2	(India) Mohamed Ryan	8	6	C	2	5	3	C	2	3	1	4	4	2	5	165
3	(India) Sohil Shah								1	4	2	2	1	1	1	148
4	(India) Divy Nandan	5	Ret	C	1	3	5	C	4	2	3	6	3	6	4	148
5	(India) Dillion Zachariah	6	3	C	4	4	4	C	6	1	5	3	7	3	Ret	138
6	(India) Chirag Ghorpade	7	1	C	6	2	1	C	5	5	Ret	5	5	DNS	DNS	122
7	(India) Chetan Korada				5	DSQ	6	C	WD	WD	WD	WD	6	5	3	51
8	(India) Rishon Rajeev	4	2	C												30
9	(India) Yash Aradhya	3	4	C												27
10	(India) Shahan Ali Mohsin	2	7	C												24
11	(United Arab Emirates) Kyle Kumaran	9	Ret	C	WD	WD	WD	C								2
—	(India) Arya Singh								WD	WD	WD	WD	WD	WD	WD	—
Pos.	Driver	CHE1 (India)			CHE2 (India)				CHE3 (India)				CHE4 (India)			Points
