= Akhil Rabindra =

Indian racing driver

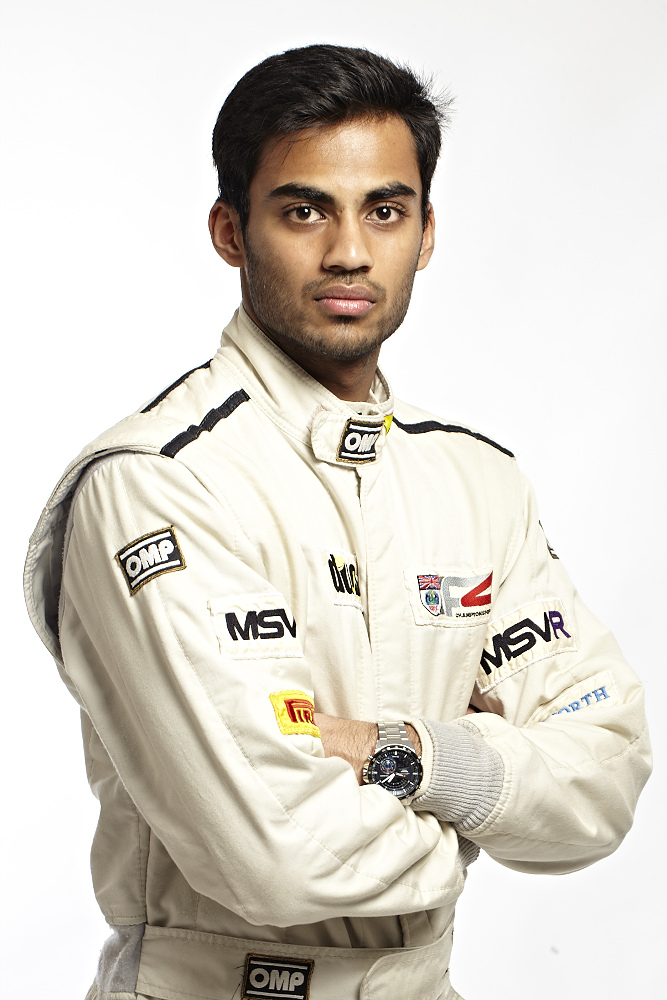
- Nationality: Indian
- Born: 22 May 1996 (age 30) Bangalore, Karnataka, India

GT4, Formula 3 career
- Debut season: 2010
- Current team: PROsport Performance
- Categorisation: FIA Silver
- Car number: 18
- Former teams: 3Y Technology / Black Bull Garage 59 / Lanan Racing
- Championships: 4
- Best finish: 1st in 2014 & 2015

Previous series
- 2011; RED BULL Kart fight JK Tyre MMS Rotax Max Rookie Championship; Amaron Karting Challenge; 2012; JK Tyre Racing Championship; JK Tyre Asia Racing Series; 2013; Toyota Vios Cup Thailand; Toyota Etios Motor Racing (EMR); Toyota Etios Colombo night Race; 2014; 2014 Formula Masters China; JK Tyre Racing Championship; 2015; 2015 BRDC Formula 4 Championship; JK Tyre Racing Championship; 2016; 2016 BRDC British Formula 3 Championship; JK Tyre Racing Championship; 2017; 2017 British GT Championship; 2018; GT4 European Series; 2018 24H GT Series; 2019; GT4 European Series; 2019 24H GT Series; 2019 Michelin Pilot Challenge; X1Racing

Championship titles
- 2013 & 2014 2014: JK Tyres Racing Championship 2014; Toyota Etios Motor Racing 2013; Totota Ethios Colombo Night Race2013

Akhil Rabindra (born 22 May 1996) is an Indian racing driver.

Along with racing on track, Rabindra is also associated with the Sean Edwards Foundation, where he is a safety ambassador.

== Early life and education ==
Rabindra is a graduate from the University of Edinburgh, Scotland.

== Racing career ==
=== Karting and single-seater racing ===
Rabindra started his motorsports career by racing in National Go Karting Championship and Formula LGB Swift in India and by winning the JK Tyres MMS Rotax Max National Rookie Championship 2011, in the same year he also was crowned the Vice Championship of Amaron National Karting Challenge along with Red Bull Kart Fight as Champion. He made his racing debut in 2012 with JK Tyre National Racing Championship in the LGB Formula-Swift, the entry-level single-seater series. In the same year, Rabindra also made two guest appearances in the JK Racing Asia Series finishing a creditable seventh in three of the races.

Rabindra was the vice champion in JK Tyre National Racing Championship 2014. 2014 saw Rabindra competing in the JK Tyre National Racing Championship driving the ex-Formula BMW cars previously raced by the likes of Sebastian Vettel, Nico Rosberg, Daniel Ricciardo, Sebastien Buemi and many more. Rabindra gained nine podium places in the four rounds and emerged as the runner-up. Rabindra also raced in a limited programme in the Formula Masters China Series driving the more powerful Tatuus FA010 chassis with a 2.0 Formula engine providing 180 HP with a best finish of fourth.

In 2014, Rabindra was nominated by the FMSCI to represent India for the FIA Institute Young Drivers Excellence Academy, where he won his place for the Asia-Pacific region. Rabindra was the winner of FIA Institute Young Driver Excellence Award 2014.

In 2015, Rabindra competed in BRDC Formula 4 Championship in the United Kingdom with Wayne Douglas Motorsport, a series for young drivers from all over the world driving the new MSV F4-013, 2-litre Ford Durance engine and paddle shift gearbox. Having to learn a new car and new tracks, Rabindra scored 203 points finishing 14th overall. Along with his main programme in BRDC F4, Rabindra also raced in the JK Tyre National Racing Championship.

2016 saw a step up to 2016 BRDC British Formula 3 Championship with the Championship winning team Lanan racing driving the all new Tatuus chassis with adjustable aerodynamics, F1 style splitters and powered by a 2-litre 230 bhp spec Cosworth engine, competing against other young drivers on F1 circuits such as Spa Francorchamps and Silverstone. Rabindra scored 124 points, finishing the series in 18th place overall.

=== Toyota Etios Motor Racing ===
Rabindra is the winner of Toyota Etios Colombo Night Race 2013, and the vice champion in Toyota Etios Motor Racing (EMR) 2013.

In 2012, Rabindra alongside racing in single seater car, debuted in touring cars driving the Toyota Etios Racing Series, and was the youngest finalist in the saloon car category in the championship and managed a podium finish at the Exhibition Race in Chennai and a strong finish in the race of Champions in Delhi ensuring his place at the Columbia Night Race 2013 He was titled vice champion in the Toyota Etios Motor Racing "Toyota Etios Motor Racing". Archived from the original on 4 February 2017. 2013. Rabindra won the event from pole position and was crowned Columbo Night Race Champion.

=== British GT Championship ===
==== 2017 ====
In the year 2017, Rabindra was selected by the McLaren GT Driver Academy to race in the British GT Championship with team Black Bull Garage 59. The academy had chosen him along with seven other drivers from across the world.

Rabindra drove along with his teammate Dean Macdonald. They finished the series with seventh in the silver category and finished the series in 13th overall. Their team Black Bull Garage 59 stood second overall in the series.

=== 24H TCE Series ===
==== 2018 ====
Rabindra had also participated in the 2018 24H TCE Series, 24-hour Silverstone 2018 with team Excelr8 Motorsport.

He had also participated in the 24H Series, 24 hours Silverstone 2018 with team Excelr8 Motorsport.

=== GT4 European Series ===
==== 2018 ====
In the 2018 Season, Rabindra joined the French Team 3Y Technology to drive in the GT4 European Series in BMW M4 GT4 Car in the silver class alongside Belgian driver Stephene Leveret and finished 18th in the silver category with a best finish of fourth in Race-3 and a top-ten result in the French GT4 round in Spain. The season began on 6 April 2018 at Zolder and ended on 16 September 2018 at Nürburgring. The team finished 12th with 147 points.

==== 2019 ====
For the 2019 season, Rabindra was selected as the Aston Martin Racing Academy Driver and competed in the GT4 European Series in an Aston Martin Vantage GT4 for PROsport Performance and Rabindra teamed up with 23-year-old Swiss racer Florian Thoma. The 2019 GT4 European Series began at Autodromo Nazionale Monza Italy on 12–14 April, where he finished eighth and seventh in two races securing ten points.

Rabindra took second in the Race-1 at the GT4 European Series held at Brands Hatch UK on 4 to 5 May 2019

==== 2020 ====
Rabindra was among 12 drivers to be retained by the Aston Martin Racing Driver Academy for the 2020 season.

=== 24H GT series ===
==== 2019 ====
Rabindra with his team PROsport Performance achieved the first podium for the New Aston Martin Vantage GT4 by finishing second in the 2019 24H GT Series European held at Mugello Circuit Italy on 29 to 30 March 2019. He won in the 2019 24H GT Series European at Circuit de Spa-Francorchamps Belgium on 19 to 20 April

Rabindra and his team scored third in the GT4 class at 2019 24H GT Series European held at Brno Circuit Czech Republic on 24 to 25 May.

=== X1 Racing League ===
Rabindra has been selected by Blackbirds Hyderabad for the inaugural season of the X1 Racing League

=== IMSA Michelin Pilot Challenge ===
==== 2019 ====
Further, Rabindra debuted in the International Motor Sports Association 2019 Michelin Pilot Challenge held at Road America, United States on 2 to 4 August and the next round held at Virginia International Raceway, on 23 to 25 August. Rabindra and teammate Ross Gunn raced to a sixth-place finish at Virginia International Raceway for Stoner Car Care on Saturday in the Automatic Racing-prepared No. 09 Stoner Car Care Aston Martin GT4. The results marked the team's best finish of the year as the squad continued to learn more each time out with the all-new Aston Martin Vantage GT4 platform.

== Racing record ==
=== Career summary ===
Year	Series	Team	Races	Wins	Poles	F/Laps	Podiums	Points	Position
2012	JK Racing Asia Series season	Meco Racing	6	0	0	0	0	0	NC
2014	Formula Masters China	Meco Motorsports	8	0	0	0	0	14	17th
2015	BRDC Formula 4 Championship	Douglas Motorsport	24	0	0	0	0	203	13th
2016	BRDC British Formula 3 Championship	Lanan Racing	23	0	0	0	0	124	18th
2017	British GT Championship - GT4	Black Bull Garage 59	10	0	0	0	0	45.5	13th
2018	GT4 European Series - Silver	3Y Technology	12	0	0	0	0	27	18th
2018	French GT4 Cup - Pro Am	3Y Technology	2	0	0	0	0	0	NC
2018	24H TCE Series - TCR	Excelr8 Motorsport	1	0	0	0	0	0	NC
2019	GT4 European Series - Silver	PROsport Performance	10	0	1	1	1	57	8th
2019	24H TCE Series - SP3	PROsport Performance	2	2	1	0	2	18	**1st**
2019	ADAC GT4 Germany	PROpeak Performance	2	0	0	0	0	13	28th
2019	Michelin Pilot Challenge - GT4	Automatic Racing AMR	4	0	1	0	0	59	42nd
2019	24H GT Series - GT4	PROsport Performance AMR	7	2	0	0	4	49	**3rd**
2020	French GT4 Cup - Pro Am	AGS Events	12	0	0	0	0	58	9th
2021	GT4 European Series - Silver	AGS Events	8	0	0	0	0	0	NC
2022	GT4 European Series - Silver	Racing Spirit of Léman	12	0	0	2	2	88	8th
2022	Indian Racing League	Hyderabad Blackbirds	6	3	2	1	3	147	**1st**
2023	GT4 European Series - Pro-Am	Racing Spirit of Léman	12	0	0	0	0	44	14th
2023	Indian Racing League	Hyderabad Blackbirds	4	0	0	0	1	56‡	6th‡
2024	Indian Racing League	Hyderabad Blackbirds	5	0	0	0	1	73‡	8th‡
2025	Indian Racing League	Kichcha's Kings Bengaluru							
2025	Indian Racing League	Hyderabad Blackbirds							

‡ Team standings.

=== Complete Indian Racing League results ===
(key) (Races in bold indicate pole position) (Races in italics indicate fastest lap)

Year	Franchise	1	2	3	4	5	6	7	8	9	10	11	12	Pos.	Pts
2022	Hyderabad Blackbirds	HYD1; 1 C	HYD1; 2 C	HYD1; 3 C	**IRU1**; **1**	IRU1; 2; 1	**IRU1**; **3**; 1	IRU2; 1; 5	IRU2; 2	IRU2; 3; 1	HYD2; 1	HYD2; 2; 5	HYD2; 3 Ret	1st	143
2023‡	Hyderabad Blackbirds	IRU1; 1 Ret^{1}	IRU1; 2 Ret	IRU2; 1	IRU2; 2; 3	IRU3; 1; 5	IRU3; 2							6th	56
2024‡	Hyderabad Blackbirds	IRU1; 1	IRU1; 2; 2	IGR; 1	IGR; 2; 6	IRU2; 1	IRU2; 2 Ret	KAR1; 1	KAR1; 2; 6	KAR2; 1	KAR2; 2 Ret			8th	73

‡ Standings based on entry points, not individual drivers.

- ^{1} – Replaced a withdrawn driver.

* Season in progress.
