= 2023 MRF Formula 2000 season =

Auto racing championship in India

The 2023 MRF Formula 2000 season was the ninth running of the Formula 2000-level single-seater championship in India previously known as the MRF Challenge. This was the second season of the championship restarted in 2022 without support of the FIA and simply called MRF Formula 2000, with the field consisting of domestic drivers rather than foreign racers competing over the European and Northern American off-season.

The season began on 22 September 2023 and was run over three weekends until December 2023. Sandeep Kumar won the championship by three points over Arya Singh.

== Drivers ==
The following drivers contested the championship:

No.	Driver	Rounds
5	(India) Chetan Korada	1–2
14	(India) Chetan Korada	3
5	(India) Jaden Pariat	3
7	(India) Aditya Swaminathan	All
10	(India) Arya Singh	All
18	(India) Sandeep Kumar	All
27	(India) Rohaan Madesh	1–2
32	(India) Arjun Chheda	2

== Race calendar and results ==
Like in the season before, the calendar consisted only of races held at Madras Motor Race Track.

Round		Circuit	Date	Pole position	Fastest lap	Winning driver	Support bill
1	R1	(India) Madras Motor Race Track, Chennai	23 September	(India) Arya Singh	(India) Aditya Swaminathan	(India) Sandeep Kumar	Super Stock Cars; Indian Touring Car National Championship; MRF F1600; Formula LGB 1300
1	R2	(India) Madras Motor Race Track, Chennai	24 September		(India) Arya Singh	(India) Chetan Korada	Super Stock Cars; Indian Touring Car National Championship; MRF F1600; Formula LGB 1300
1	R3	(India) Madras Motor Race Track, Chennai	24 September		(India) Aditya Swaminathan	(India) Sandeep Kumar	Super Stock Cars; Indian Touring Car National Championship; MRF F1600; Formula LGB 1300
2	R1	(India) Madras Motor Race Track, Chennai	14 October	(India) Aditya Swaminathan	(India) Rohaan Madesh	(India) Aditya Swaminathan	MRF Saloons; Indian Touring Car National Championship; MRF F1600; Formula LGB 1300
2	R2	(India) Madras Motor Race Track, Chennai	15 October		(India) Aditya Swaminathan	(India) Aditya Swaminathan	MRF Saloons; Indian Touring Car National Championship; MRF F1600; Formula LGB 1300
2	R3	(India) Madras Motor Race Track, Chennai	15 October		(India) Aditya Swaminathan	(India) Sandeep Kumar	MRF Saloons; Indian Touring Car National Championship; MRF F1600; Formula LGB 1300
3	R1	(India) Madras Motor Race Track, Chennai	16 December	(India) Sandeep Kumar	(India) Jaden Pariat	(India) Arya Singh	F4 Indian Championship; Indian Touring Car National Championship; MRF F1600; Formula LGB 1300
3	R2	(India) Madras Motor Race Track, Chennai	17 December		(India) Jaden Pariat	(India) Aditya Swaminathan	F4 Indian Championship; Indian Touring Car National Championship; MRF F1600; Formula LGB 1300
3	R3	(India) Madras Motor Race Track, Chennai	17 December		(India) Arya Singh	(India) Aditya Swaminathan	F4 Indian Championship; Indian Touring Car National Championship; MRF F1600; Formula LGB 1300

== Season report ==
Five cars were present for the season opener in late September. Arya Singh took pole position for the first race, but both Sandeep Kumar and Aditya Swaminathan both beat him in the race to come first and second in the first race. Chetan Korada was the man to beat in the second race, while Kumar got another podium in second and Rohaan Madesh came third. Race three saw Kumar become the first repeat winner of the season, ahead of Singh and Korada, to end the weekend in the leading Korada in the championship.

The grid grew to six entries for round two a three weeks later, where Swaminathan won pole position. He was able to hold on to his advantage to take his maiden win ahead of Korada and Madesh. Swaminathan doubled up in race two to take another win. Singh and Kumar completed the podium, before the latter was able to get back on top of the order to win the final race of the weekend. Singh came second again and Madesh third. Kumar now led the standings, 25 points ahead of Singh, with 75 points still on offer.

The season final only attracted five drivers. Championship leader Kumar took pole position for race one, but Singh beat him in the race to record his maiden victory. Jaden Pariat and Korada took the podium spots, while Kumar in fourth saw his lead reduced to only twelve points. Swaminathan won race two, where Singh got second ahead of Pariat to shorten the standings gap to now only six points. Race three saw Singh come third, but Kumar in fourth had just enough points in hand to win the title.

While the championship battle was a close and entertaining one, interest in the series came to an all-time low in 2023. With the return of an official FIA affliction not looking likely at this stage, any future of the series on an international stage remains in doubt.

== Championship standings ==
Scoring system

Position	1st	2nd	3rd	4th	5th	6th	7th	8th	9th	10th
Points	25	18	15	12	10	8	6	4	2	1

=== Drivers' Championship ===
Pos.	Driver	CHE1 (India)			CHE2 (India)			CHE3 (India)			Points
1	(India) Sandeep Kumar	1	2	1	5	3	1	4	4	4	154
2	(India) Arya Singh	3	4	2	4	2	2	1	2	3	151
3	(India) Aditya Swaminathan	2	5	DSQ	1	1	6	Ret	1	1	136
4	(India) Chetan Korada	4	1	3	3	4	4	3	5	5	126
5	(India) Rohaan Madesh	5	3	Ret	2	6	3				66
6	(India) Jaden Pariat							2	3	2	51
7	(India) Arjun Chheda				6	5	5				28
Pos.	Driver	CHE1 (India)			CHE2 (India)			CHE3 (India)			Points
