= Chetan Korada =

Indian racing driver (born 1986)

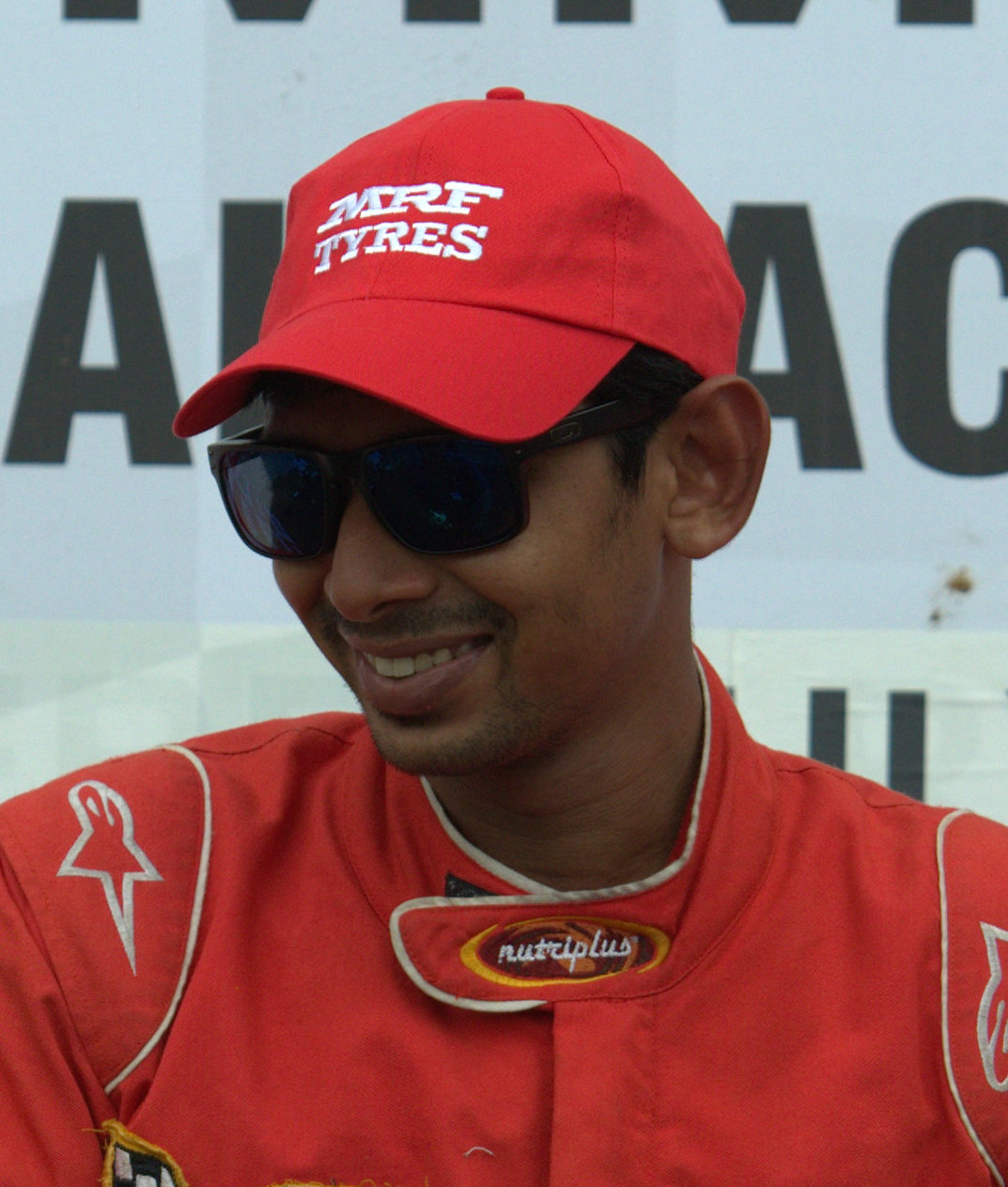
- Chetan at the Madras Motor Race Track
- Nationality: (India) Indian
- Born: 14 November 1986 (age 39) Rajahmundry, Andhra Pradesh

Chetan Korada (born 14 November 1986) is an Indian racing driver who holds the distinction of being the first ever driver in the world to win a race using synthetic feet. He is also the first in Asia, and second in the world after former Formula One driver Alex Zanardi, to compete in motorsport using a prosthetic leg. Having been born with a deformity during birth, he had undergone bi-lateral amputation at an early age under medical advice.

Having started racing in 2007, Korada took part in various championships with relative success, including the title and five victories out of six races in the 2009 MMSC Summer Cup Championship (Class-FISSME), as well as a first-place finish in Round 4 of the JK Tyre FMSCI National Racing Championship (Class-Formula LGB Swift 1300cc). He has worked with teams such as WSRF (Wallace Sports Research Foundation), Rams Racing and Meco Motorsports in the past. More recently, he finished runner-up in the National Formula LGB 1300 Championship.

== Personal life ==
Korada was born in Rajahmundry, Andhra Pradesh and brought up in Tamil Nadu. He qualified in fields of education and graduated in 2006. Throughout the years of schooling and graduation, he was an active participant in various sports such as Cricket and Basketball. He has also explored music and stood as a Disc jockey in south India for a noticeable period and still continues to perform once a year internationally, to keep up with his interest towards music.

Korada is currently based in Chennai with his family.

== Racing career ==
=== 2007 ===
In the former part of his racing career, Korada participated in Round 2 of JK Tyre National racing championship 2007.

=== 2008 ===
Korada went on to participate in three races of the MMSC Summer Cup, which gained him a 3rd-place finish. (Class- Formula Maruti/FISSME-800cc) In the same year, he took part in the JK Tyre Jr. National racing Championship and finished the race in 3 X third place. (Class- FISSME)

=== 2009 ===
This year saw a turn in Korada's racing career, as he made five wins and one second place out of six races in the MMSC Summer Cup Champion 2009(Class-FISSME) adding a feather to his crown of winning.

=== 2010 ===
In 2010, Korada took part in the JK Tyre Jr. National racing Championship (Class-FISSME), and finished the race with 2X 3rd, 1 X 1st Place and 1 X 2nd place.

=== 2011 ===
During 2011, Korada participated in the JK Tyre Jr. National racing Championship with 3 X 3rd, 2 X 1st Place and 1 X 2nd-place finishes. (Class-FISSME). The memorable moment in the history of his racing career happened as he made a legendary finish on 1st place in Round 4 in the JK Tyre FMSCI National racing championship (Class-Formula LGB Swift 1300cc), starting from 12th on the grid out of 24 race cars. He was the runner up at the Kart1 racing event Recg. by FMSCI (Class-4 stroke-9 BHP Karts), during the same year.

=== 2012 ===
In 2012, Korada participated in the JK Tyre FMSCI National racing Championship (Class-Formula 4 LGB) and in the Formula 1 Support races in the JK Racing Asia series held in Buddh International Circuit (Class-Formula BMW) He was the MMS Mini Enduro winner (Class-9BHP Karts) for the same year.

=== 2013 ===
In this year, Korada went on to participate in the JK TyreRotax max national championship which was followed by the participation in JK Tyre racing series (Class-Formula 4 LGB). The ardent racer also participated in the final round of the MRF FMSCI National racing Championship with a 3rd-place finish, during the same year.

=== 2014 ===
By participating in the MRF FMSCI National racing Championship (Class-Formula 1300) in the year of 2014, Korada completed the round 1 of the racing championship with 2 X 3rd-place finishes. He finished fourth out of 24 finalists (From 5790 Entries) in the Mercedes Benz Younger Star Driver Challenge (Class- Mercedes Benz C220 & Mercedes CLA 45 AMG).

=== 2015 ===
In the year of 2015, Korada was the MRF FMSCI National Racing Runner-up Champion (Class: Formula 1300 ) and also competed in the Formula 1600 series in the MRF FMSCI National racing championship 2015. In the latter part of his racing life, Chetan took the role of Instructor for Nissan PS3 GT Academy, India.

=== 2016 ===
Last year, Korada was preferred for being the Instructor for TATA Prima truck racing program. He also competed in the MRF National racing championship (Class: Formula MRF 1600).

=== 2017 ===
Most recently, Korada became the Formula MRF 1600 National champion second runner up in the MRF FMSCI national racing championship 2017 with a feat of five podium finishes.

== Public appearances ==
Korada was an invited speaker at many esteemed venues; such as the TedX Youth at Chennai and the Breakfast show in Chennai Live Radio, in the year 2011. He was also the honored spokesperson at the Tie Con 2014(Indus Entrepreneurship Conference) titled "I CAN DO IT" in the year 2014. While in 2015, he rendered a motivational speech to the members of MMA Madras Management Association. He appeared in the national event of Indian youth conclave 2016 which was held in Chennai to inspire young minds to pursue their passion and reach greater heights.

== Racing record ==
=== Career summary ===
Season	Series	Team	Races	Wins	Poles	F/Laps	Podiums	Points	Position
2012	JK Racing Asia Series	Meco Racing	2	0	0	0	0	0	NC†
2015	MRF Formula 1600 Championship	MRF Racing	?	?	?	?	?	63	5th
2015-16	MRF Formula 1600 Championship	MRF Racing	?	?	?	?	?	20	10th
2017-18	MRF Formula 1600 Championship	MRF Racing	?	?	?	?	?	14	6th
2018	Formula 4 South East Asia Championship	Meritus.GP	3	0	0	0	0	10	21st
2018-19	MRF Challenge Formula 2000 Championship	MRF Racing	15	0	0	0	0	9	15th
2019-20	MRF Challenge Formula 2000 Championship	MRF Racing	15	0	0	0	0	31	12th
2022-23	MRF Formula 2000	MRF Racing	6	0	0	0	1	51	7th
2023	MRF Formula 2000	MRF Racing	9	1	0	0	4	130	4th
2024	F4 Indian Championship	Chennai Turbo Riders	2	0	0	0	0	0	26th
2025-26	MRF Formula 2000	MRF Racing	3	0	0	0	0	35	7th

† As Korada was a guest driver, he was ineligible to score points.

== References & External links ==
=== News articles ===
- thehindu.com
- thehindu.com
- thehindu.com
- http://archive.asianage.com/racing/youngster-artificial-legs-emerges-winner-formula-swift-race-888
- http://www.motorsport.com/driver/chetan-korada/

=== References ===
1. https://www.youtube.com/watch?v=Law9dX56KXU(TedX)
2. https://www.youtube.com/watch?v=WIccqRd1fgM (JKNRC 2013 FLGB (Rd.4, Race 2) Chetan Korada)
3. https://www.youtube.com/watch?v=eIhV4tsjz4E (breakfast show)
