= Formula LGB Hyundai =

Overview
- Manufacturer: Super Speeds (Pvt) Ltd, India
- Production: 2007 – 2009

Body and chassis
- Class: Open Wheeled Formula Racing Car
- Chassis: Spaceframe

Powertrain
- Engine: 1400cc Hyundai Accent, Rear Mounted, Longitudinal

Formula LGB Hyundai is a single seater, open wheel class of motorsport in India launched in 2006 by LGB with Hyundai the engine supplier. The cars are powered by 1.4 liter Indian built Hyundai Accent engines in the entry level JK Road Racing National Championship series. This car along with Formula LGB Swift can be considered as an Indian equivalent of Europe's Formula Ford series, where it is void of aerodynamic aids like wings. This series is one of the starter formula series to enable karting drivers step into a formula car.

== Name ==
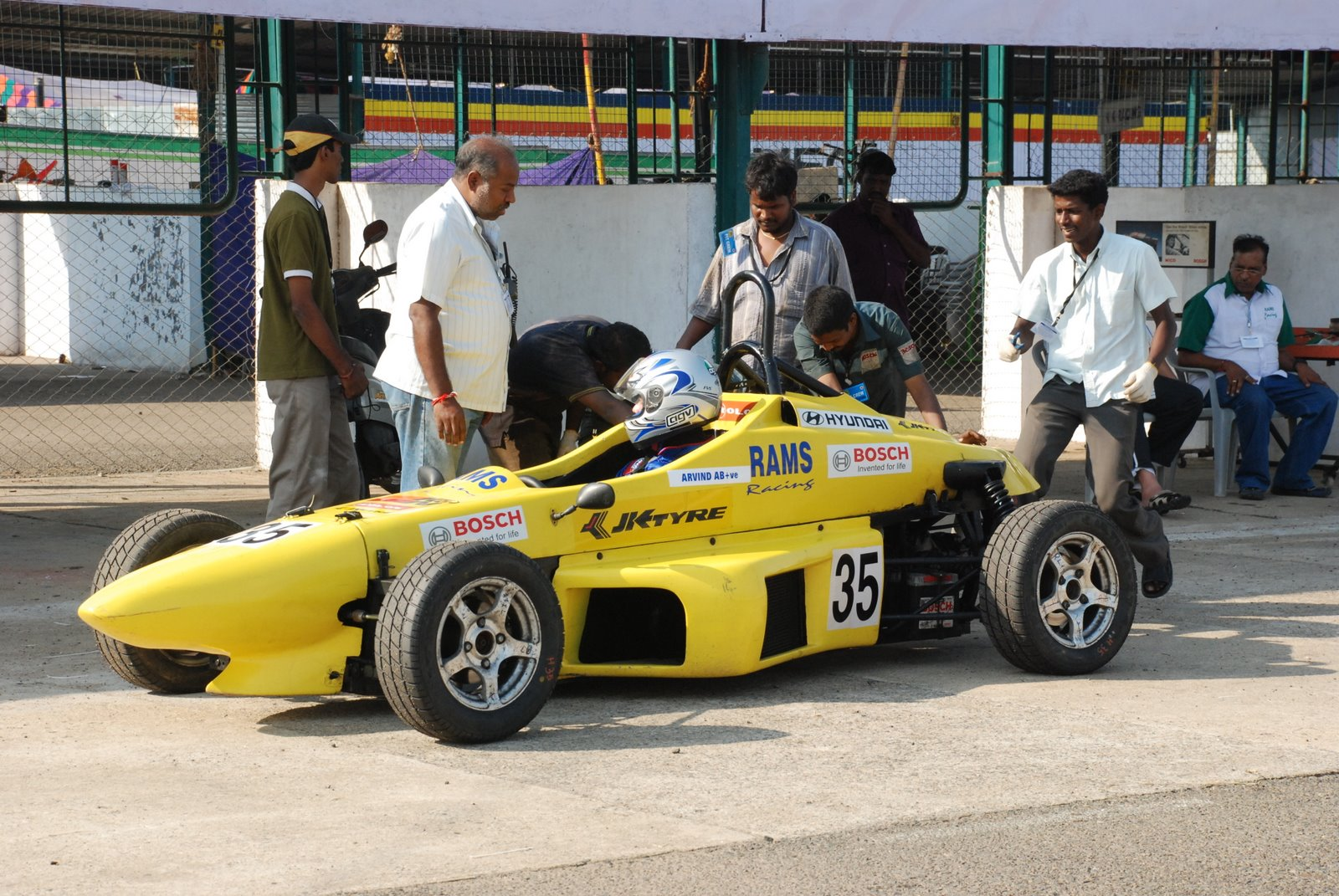
A formula Rolon Hyundai of Rams Racing leaving the pits during the 2009 JK Tyres endurance single seater race.

LGB (L.G. Balakrishnan Brothers) is named for the manufacturers of Rolon chains and sprockets, which is also the parent company of Super Speeds which designs and constructs the cars. Hyundai is named as the engine supplier.

== Engine ==
The engine is supplied by Hyundai India Ltd. The engine was the stock version of the 1.5 L 16-valve DOHC Alpha I4, 101 hp (75 kW) used in Indian-built Hyundai Accent Viva. The engine and gearbox are mounted in a longitudinal layout. This was also Hyundai’s first involvement into formula car racing as an engine supplier.

== Chassis ==
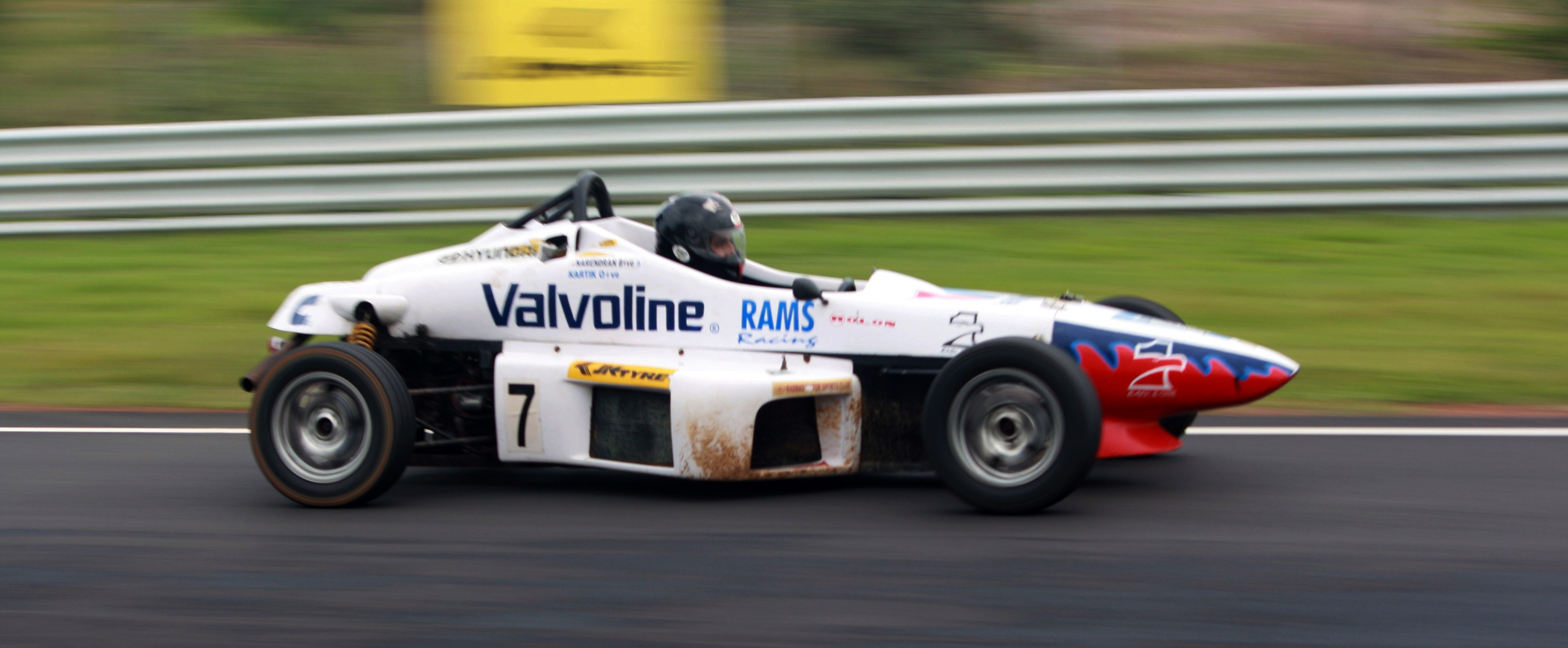
A Valvoline sponsored Formula LGB Hyundai of Rams Racing during 2008 sprint series race

The chassis is a steel space frame monocoque using square seamless steel tubes. The chassis frame design is very similar to the Formula LGB Swift frame but longer by 100 mm to improve straightline stability. Tyres are grooved racing slicks supplied by JK Tyres' motorsports division.

The exterior panels are made out of composite fire retardant fibre-reinforced plastic. The wingless front nosecone is raised at the front tip as in the new formula cars while accommodating a splitter beneath. This is to re-route the front air into the side pods while preventing under tray flow.

== Costs ==
It is one of the cheapest formula cars in the world to race, with rental for Friday practice, Saturday qualifying and a double race on Sunday (15 laps each), costing only $800 (as of 2005). That includes tires and fuel.

== Races ==
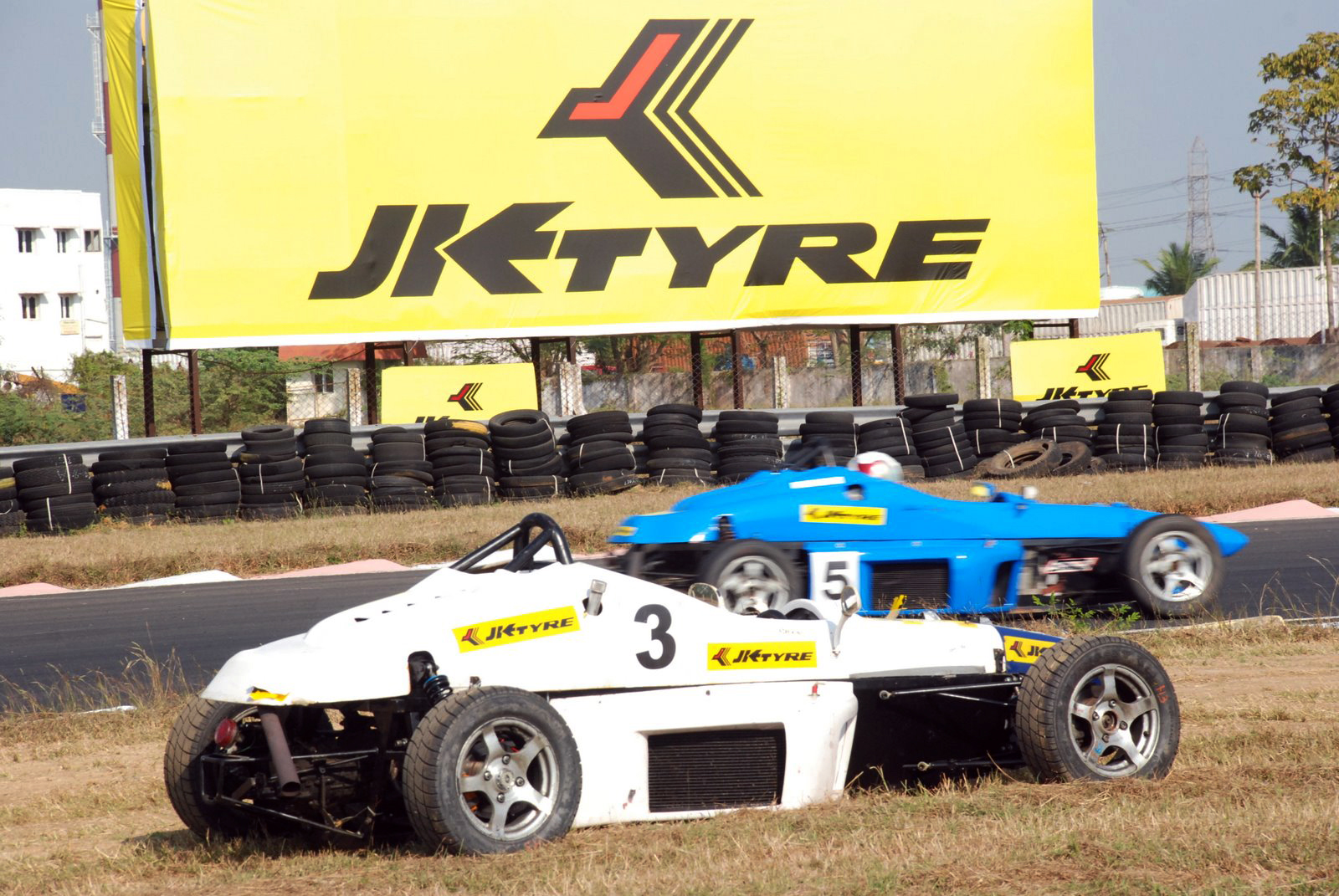
A Formula LGB Hyundai in foreground parked kerbside and another passing on track in background 2008

Races for the national championship are held at Coimbatore's Kari Motor Speedway and at Chennai's MMSC Irrugatukottai track.

The car is designed and built by Coimbatore based Super Speeds Pvt. Ltd. for LG Sports, makers of ROLON chains and sprockets, Coimbatore. The car was designed by ex-racer B. Viji (also known as B. Vijaykumar). Also JK Tyres play a major role in the series championships in tyre and driver support, while ex-formula 3 champ Akbar Ebrahim, also the boss of Team India's A1 Grand Prix, conducts a racing school to train the new drivers. The first champion (in 2006) to emerge from this series was former karting and 2005 Formula LGB champion Reo Banajee after a closely contested season.

== Endurance race class ==
From 2008 season the Formula LGB Hyundai races were changed to endurance format with two drivers for 50 laps including pit stop.

== Champions ==
Year	Driver	Team	Chassis/Engine
JK Tyre National Racing Championship
2006	(India) Rayomand Banajee	Prime Sports	Super Speeds - Hyundai DOHC 1.5L MPFI
2007	(India) Ashwin Sundar	Rams Racing	Super Speeds - Hyundai DOHC 1.5L MPFI
2008	(India) Prithveen Rajan/Sudanand Rajan(two driver endurance championship in 2008)	Team WSRF with Leela	Super Speeds - Hyundai DOHC 1.5L MPFI
2009	(India) Akhil Devrag(one driver endurance championship)		Super Speeds - Hyundai DOHC 1.SL MPFI

- * Short Sprint Race

== See also ==
- Formula LGB Swift
- Formula Maruti
- Formula Rolon
- JK Tyre National Racing Championship
