= McLaren GT Driver Academy =

McLaren GT Driver Academy logo

The McLaren GT Driver Academy, formerly known as McLaren GT Young Driver Programme is the programme launched by McLaren GT in 2015 to offer greater benefits to a larger pool of drivers who hold a range of different on-track experience.

== Current drivers ==
Driver	Years	2017 series
(United Kingdom) Andrew Watson	2015–17	Blancpain GT Series
(United Kingdom) Ben Barnicoat	2017	Blancpain GT Series
(Belgium) Loris Hezemans	2017	Blancpain GT Series
(Malaysia) Jazeman Jaafar	2017	Blancpain GT Series Endurance Cup
(Italy) David Fumanelli	2017	Blancpain GT Series Endurance Cup
(United Kingdom) Sandy Mitchell	2017	British GT
(United Kingdom) Ciaran Haggerty	2017	British GT
(India) Akhil Rabindra	2017	British GT
(United Kingdom) Dean Macdonald	2017	British GT

== Former drivers ==
Driver	Years	Series competed
(United Kingdom) Ross Wylie	2015	British GT
(Switzerland) Alex Fontana	2016	Blancpain GT Series Endurance Cup
(United Kingdom) Struan Moore	2016	Blancpain GT Series Endurance Cup
(United States) Colin Thompson	2016	Pirelli World Challenge

== See also ==
- McLaren Driver Development Programme
- McLaren Autosport BRDC Award
