= Diana Pundole =

Indian racing driver

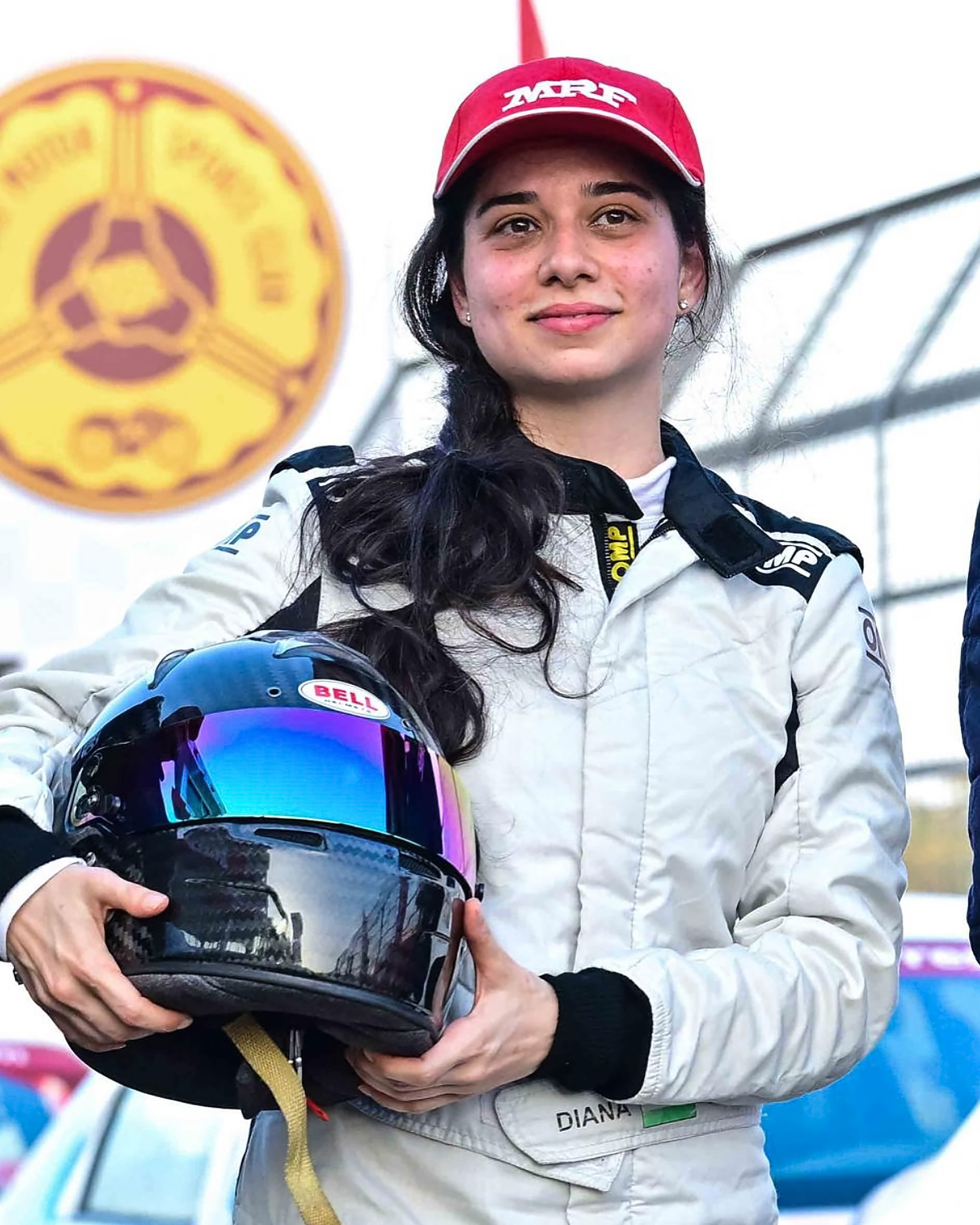
- Diana Pundole in 2025
- Nationality: Indian
- Born: 15 August 1993 (age 33) Pune, Maharashtra, India
- Years active: 2018 - present
- Championships: MRF MMSC FMSCI Indian National Car Racing Championship – MRF Saloons (2024)

Diana Pundole (born 15 August 1993) is an Indian racing driver from Pune, Maharashtra. She is the first Indian woman to win a National championship in the history of Indian motor sports where lady racing drivers compete on equal footing with male drivers. She won the National title in the MRF MMSC fmsci Indian National Car Racing Championship 2024 in the saloon cars class organised by Madras Motor Sports Club at the Madras International Circuit, near Chennai on 18 August 2024.

== Early life and education ==
Pundole was born into a Parsi family in Pune. She completed her M.A. in English in 2015.

== Career ==
In 2018, she started her racing career. She took part in the nationwide Talent Hunt for ‘Women in Motorsport’ organised by JK Tyres in Coimbatore. Out of about 200 participants, she was selected in the top six, who were given a fellowship for a free drive for one year in the JK Tyre National Racing Championship. She took part in the championship for two years in 2018 and 2019. In 2021, she participated in the Volkswagen Polo Cup championship at Chennai and a year later, she made a big jump in 2023 to take part in the MRF Saloon Cars National Championship. In 2024, she capped her six year journey winning the National Championship in Saloon cars, with multiple wins, fastest laps and pole positions.
