= Formula Maruti =

Single-seat racing championship

- Category: Single seaters
- Country: India
- Engine suppliers: Maruti 800
- Drivers' champion: (India) Mohit Aryan
- Teams' champion: (India) Wallace Sports Research Foundation

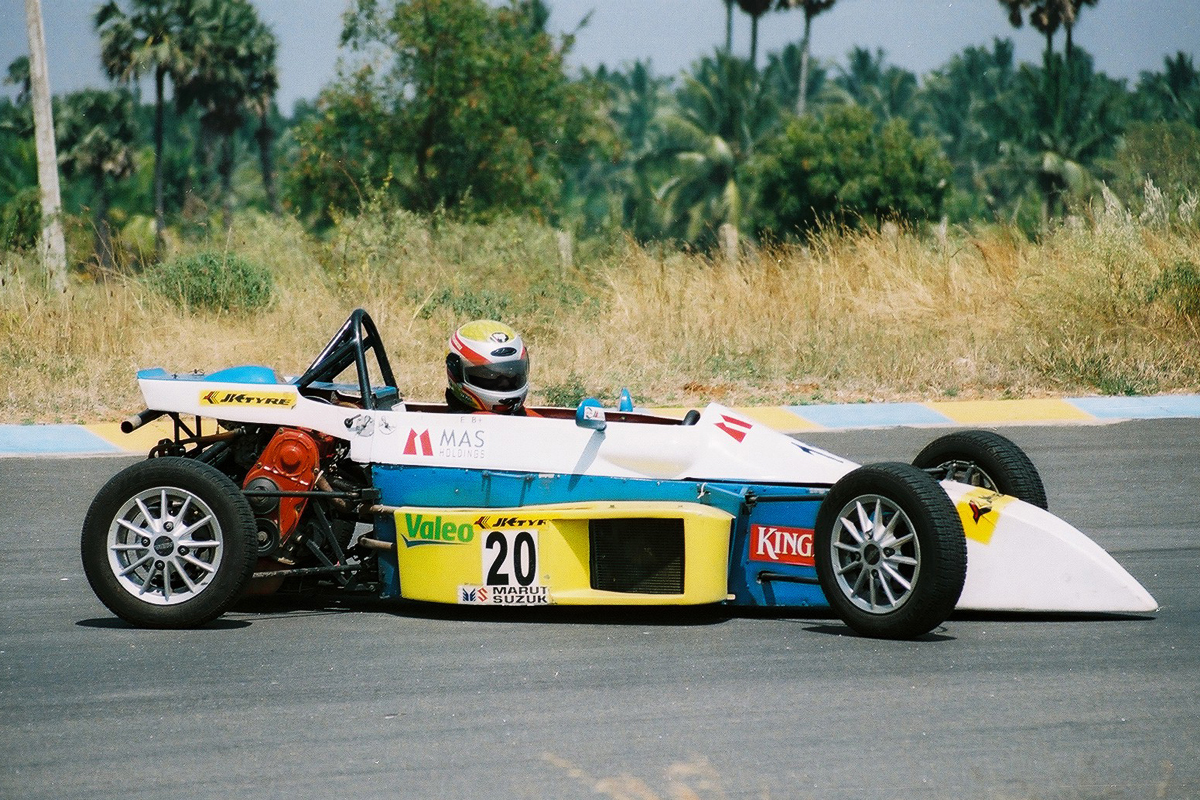
A Formula Maruti racing car

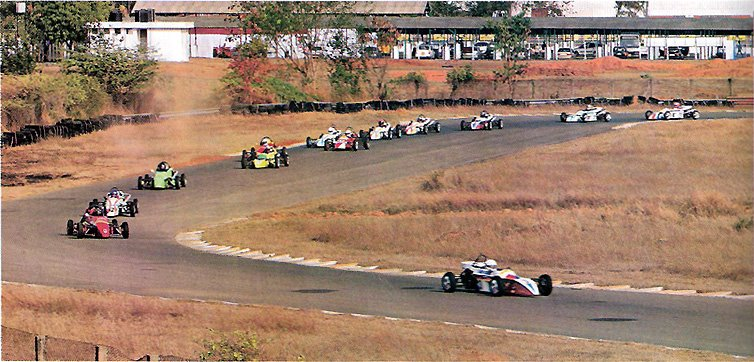
First round races of the 2006 JK Tyre Junior Cup - Ajay Kini leads Ajit Narasimhan and Rana Kar out of C3

Formula Maruti was a single-seater, open-wheel class in motorsport made and raced in India. Many of the top teams in Indian motorsports have run in the series, including Team Lakshmi Mills Superspeeds, Team JK, Team MRF, Gabriel Racing, WSRF Racing, McDowell Racing, and Team Valvoline. Top Indian drivers have started their career racing in Formula Maruti, most notably Narain Karthikeyan, Parthiva Sureshwaren, Karun Chandhok and other drivers who have had quite a successful outing in this form are Ajay Kini, Mohit Aryan, Goutham Parekh, Devang Shah, Narendhran, Sudarshan Rao, Kartik Shankar.

== Design ==
The car was a brainchild of S. Karivardhan who wanted an affordable single seater that can be highly economical to run/own, as well as being a stepping stone to several new drivers. It made its debut in 1988 at the Sholavaram races in Chennai. Young drivers in India often begin their competitive careers in Formula Maruti, or after a few years in Karting. Formula Maruti provides drivers with their first insights of a racecar, their first racecar experience, and this is where they cut their teeth in racecar set-up.

== Engine ==
The engine and gearbox are from Maruti 800 car, which is an 800 cc 3-cylinder engine. This series is a regular in the Indian motorsport scene ever since its launch in 1988. The chassis is a spaceframe monocoque with FRP body panels.

== Teams ==
- WSRF
- Rams Racing

== Champions ==
| Season | Champion |
|---|---|
| 1999 | (India) Parthiva Sureshwaren |
| 2000 | (India) Karun Chandhok |
| 2004 | (India) Gaurav Gill |
| 2005 | (India) Raymond Banajee |
| 2006 | (India) Thrivikraman Seshachalam |
| 2007 Summer | (India) Naren Shankar |
| 2007 December | (India) Goutham Parekh |
| 2008 | (India) Gokul Krishna |
| 2011 | (India) Mohit Aryan |

== See also ==
- Formula Rolon
- Formula LGB Hyundai
- Formula LGB Swift
- Formula Rolon Chevrolet
