= Formula LGB Swift =

Racecar

Overview
- Manufacturer: Super Speeds (Pvt) Ltd, India
- Production: 2004 - Present

Body and chassis
- Class: Open wheeled formula racing car
- Chassis: Spaceframe

Powertrain
- Engine: 1300cc 87bhp Maruti Suzuki Swift Rear Mounted, Longitudinal

Dimensions
- Curb weight: 450 kg

Formula LGB Swift is a single seater, open wheel class in motorsport in India launched in 2003. The cars are powered by 1.3 liter Maruti Esteem engines (also used in the Suzuki Swift) and are driven by top and upcoming Indian drivers in the National Racing Championship. This car can be considered as an Indian equivalent of Europe's Formula Ford series, where it is void of aerodynamic aids like wings. From 2006 this car replaced Formula Maruti as an entry-level formula car. This series offers the first feel and insights into open wheel racing for an upcoming race driver.

== Name ==
LGB denotes L. G. Balakrishnan Brothers, the manufacturers of Rolon chains and sprockets. LGB is the parent company of Super Speeds which designs and constructs the cars. Swift denotes the engine supplier Maruti Udyog. The car was named Formula LGB from 2003 till 2005. In 2006 Swift was added to avoid name confusion with the launch of another Hyundai engined Formula LGB (Formula LGB Hyundai) which was slightly different in layout and design.

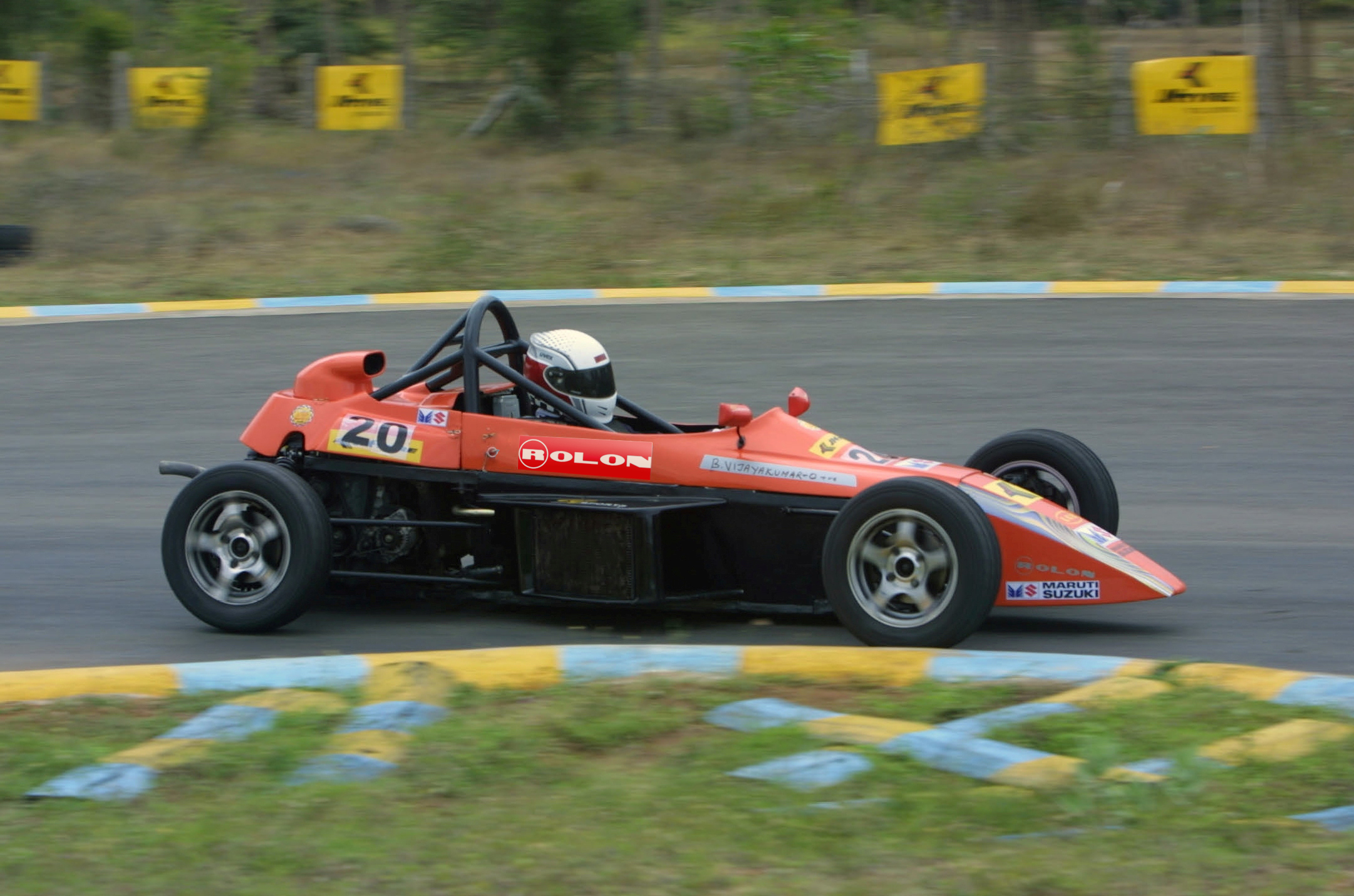
Formula LGB Swift single seater racing car of Mohammed Aaqib at Kari Motor Speedway track in Coimbatore

== Design ==
=== Early version ===
The car was originally named Formula LGB from 2003 till 2005 and the engines were the same 1.3 liter used in the Maruti Esteem but in carburated form with a single overhead cam. Still the car had 50% more power (65 b.h.p. being its stock version in carburetor form), than the stock version in race trim.

=== Current version ===
In the 2006 season, the car was renamed Formula LGB Swift and Maruti Swift's 1.3 litre 16 valve MPFI engine was refitted. The new engines were left in stock form as the new engines could reach over 90 bhp (67 kW). The engine is mounted in a transverse direction with the stock gearbox as in a front wheel drive car. The wheelbase is between 2,190–2,200 mm (86–87 in) and the weight of the car (minus the driver) is 450 kg (990 lb).

=== Chassis ===
The chassis is a steel spaceframe monocoque with fire retardant composite GRP panels. The design is on the heavier side, mainly for structural and safety reasons. The steel tubes are of square section and the tyres are supplied by JK Tyres in a grooved slick pattern. The Formula Swift rides on aluminium wheels and both front and rear tyres are 185/60.

== Costs ==
Along with Formula LGB Hyundai, Formula LGB Swift has a relatively low entry cost, with rental for Friday practise, Saturday qualifying and a double race on Sunday (15 laps each), costing $800 (as of 2005). That rate includes tyres and fuel.

== Races ==
Races for the national championship are held at Coimbatore's Kari Motor Speedway and at Chennai's MMSC Irrugatukottai track. The car is designed and built by Coimbatore-based Super Speeds Pvt. Ltd. for LG Sports, makers of Rolon chains and sprockets, Coimbatore. The car was designed by ex-racer B. Viji (also known as B. Vijaykumar) with JK Tyres being the championship sponsor and also sponsoring some of the drivers. Maruti Udyog presents the championship winner a brand new Maruti car. In 2006 it was Maruti Swift.

== Champions ==
Year	Driver	Team	Chassis/Engine
JK Tyre National Racing Championship
2004	(India) Armaan Ebrahim	LG Sports	Super Speeds - Maruti Esteem 1.3L Carbureted
2005	(India) Raymond Banajee	LG Sports	Super Speeds - Maruti Esteem 1.3L Carbureted
2006	(India) Saran Vikram	Team WSRF	Super Speeds - Suzuki Swift 1.3L MPFI
2007	(India) Ashwin Sundar	Team RAMS Racing	Super Speeds - Suzuki Swift 1.3L MPFI
2008	(India) Karthik Shankar	Team RAMS Racing	Super Speeds - Suzuki Swift 1.3L MPFI
2009	(India) Sudarshan Rao	Team RAMS Racing	Super Speeds - Suzuki Swift 1.3L MPFI
2010	(India) Ajay Kini	Team WSRF	Super Speeds - Suzuki Swift 1.3L MPFI
2011	(India) Ameya Walavalkar	Team MARS Racings	Super Speeds - Suzuki Swift 1.3L MPFI
2013	(India) Deepak Chinnappa	Team Anish Racing	Super Speeds - Suzuki Swift 1.3L MPFI
2015	(India) Mohit Aryan	Team Anish Racing	Super Speeds - Suzuki Swift 1.3L MPFI
2021	(India) Vishnu Prasad	Msport	Suzuki Swift 1.3L MPFI
2022	(India) Aswhin Datta	Dark Don Racing	Suzuki Swift 1.3L MPFI

* Denotes wins in Formula LGB

== See also ==
- Formula LGB Hyundai
- FISSME (a.k.a.Formula Maruti)
- Formula Rolon
- JK Tyre National Racing Championship

== More pictures ==
- https://web.archive.org/web/20070520121336/http://www.thehinduimages.com:8080/hindu/photoDetail.do?photoId=4724733
- https://web.archive.org/web/20070522120707/http://www.thehinduimages.com:8080/hindu/photoDetail.do?photoId=4724739
- https://web.archive.org/web/20070520121824/http://www.thehinduimages.com:8080/hindu/photoDetail.do?photoId=4956633
