= Ashwin Sundar =

Indian racing driver

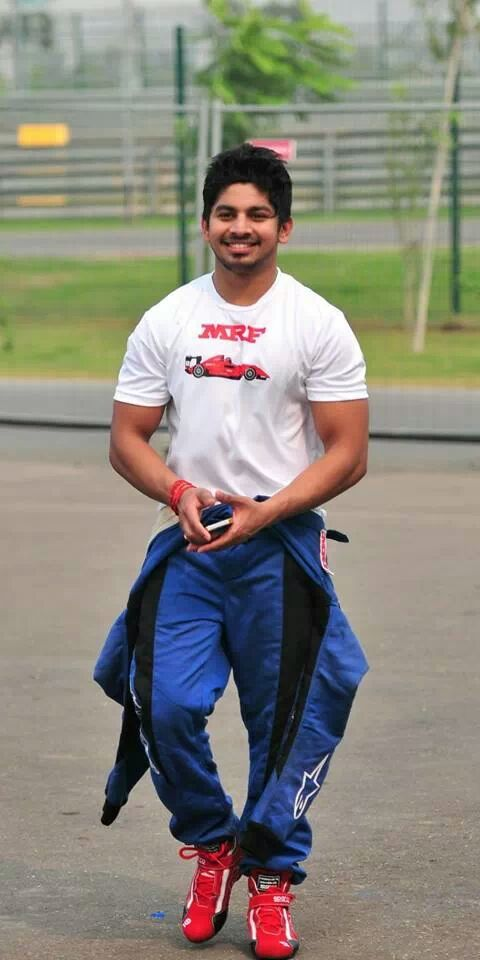
- Ashwin in 2014
- Nationality: Indian
- Born: 27 July 1985 Madras, Tamil Nadu, India (now Chennai)
- Died: 18 March 2017 (aged 31) Chennai, Tamil Nadu, India
- Teams: N.K. Racing, Rams Racing, MRF Racing, TVS Racing

Ashwin Sundar (27 July 1985 – 18 March 2017) was a race driver from Chennai, India. Most active during 2005 winning several titles in karting, single seater Formula Cars, Two Wheeler racing and Saloon car races.

== Early life ==
Sundar is from Chennai, Tamil Nadu.

== Career ==
In 2007, Sunder won two classes, Formula Swift and Formula Hyundai. In February 2008, he graduated to a higher class and made his debut at the Irungattukottai MMRT track in the Formula Rolon-Chevrolet class in the first round of the JK Tyre National Racing Championship.

In July 2009, Sundar won the third round of the Rolon races in the JK Tyre National Racing Championship.

== Death ==
Sundar died on 18 March 2017 in a road accident. His BMW Z4 car he was driving caught fire after hitting a tree and getting stuck between the tree and a wall on the roadside. He and his wife, Niveditha, were burnt alive in the fire.
