= Formula LGB =

Type of race cars

Formula LGB is a series of single seater, open wheel class race cars manufactured by Super Speeds (A division of L.G.Balakrishnan Brothers, the manufacturers of Rolon Chains and Sprockets) for LG Sports in Coimbatore, India. These cars are similar to the wingless Formula Fords intended as a low cost starter series with power in the range of 90 to 100 bhp (70 to 75 kW).

The cars were launched in India in 2003 and up till 2005 only one model was manufactured hence simply known as Formula LGB.In 2006 when another Hyundai engined model was launched the existing Formula LGB became Formula LGB Swift to avoid confusion of model name.

== See ==
- Formula LGB Hyundai
- Formula LGB Swift
