= 2026–27 MRF Formula 2000 season =

Auto racing championship in India

The 2026–27 MRF Formula 2000 season is the twelfth running of the Formula 2000-level single-seater championship in India previously known as the MRF Challenge. This is the sixth season of the championship restarted in 2022 without support of the FIA and simply called MRF Formula 2000, with the field consisting of domestic drivers rather than foreign racers competing over the European and Northern American off-season.

The season began on 17 July 2026 and will be run over five weekends until 21 February 2027.

== Drivers ==
The following drivers, all of them Indian-registered, contest the championship:

No.	Driver	Rounds
1	Ishaan Madesh	2–3
4	Swarnav Das	1–3
33	Saishiva Sankaran	1–3
44	Keith Desouza	1
67	Krishay Gutte	1–3
76	Aditya Patnaik	1
99	Raghul Rangasamy	2–3

== Race calendar and results ==
The calendar for the 2026–27 season was announced on 6 June 2026, with the venues for rounds 2 and 3 yet to be officially confirmed. All rounds will be part of the MRF Indian National Racing Challenge. Due to an FIA track inspection at Madras Motor Race Track in late July of 2026, the first round was cancelled and later replaced with a round in February of 2027. Despite plans to host races at Kari Motor Speedway and a further undisclosed track in Bengaluru, all five rounds were held at Madras Motor Race Track. All rounds ran in support of the MRF Indian National Racing Challenge.

Round		Circuit	Date	Pole position	Fastest Lap	Winning driver	Map of circuit locations
2026							2026–27 MRF Formula 2000 season is located in India
1	R1	Madras Motor Race Track, Irungattukottai	22 August	Saishiva Sankaran	Saishiva Sankaran	Saishiva Sankaran	2026–27 MRF Formula 2000 season is located in India
1	R2	Madras Motor Race Track, Irungattukottai	23 August		Saishiva Sankaran	Saishiva Sankaran	2026–27 MRF Formula 2000 season is located in India
1	R3	Madras Motor Race Track, Irungattukottai	23 August		Saishiva Sankaran	Saishiva Sankaran	2026–27 MRF Formula 2000 season is located in India
2	R1	Madras Motor Race Track, Irungattukottai	26 September	Saishiva Sankaran	Ishaan Madesh	Saishiva Sankaran	2026–27 MRF Formula 2000 season is located in India
2	R2	Madras Motor Race Track, Irungattukottai	27 September		Saishiva Sankaran	Saishiva Sankaran	2026–27 MRF Formula 2000 season is located in India
2	R3	Madras Motor Race Track, Irungattukottai	27 September		Ishaan Madesh	Ishaan Madesh	2026–27 MRF Formula 2000 season is located in India
3	R1	Madras Motor Race Track, Irungattukottai	10 October	Ishaan Madesh	Ishaan Madesh	Ishaan Madesh	2026–27 MRF Formula 2000 season is located in India
3	R2	Madras Motor Race Track, Irungattukottai	11 October		Krishay Gutte	Krishay Gutte	2026–27 MRF Formula 2000 season is located in India
3	R3	Madras Motor Race Track, Irungattukottai	11 October		Ishaan Madesh	Ishaan Madesh	2026–27 MRF Formula 2000 season is located in India
2027							2026–27 MRF Formula 2000 season is located in India
4	R1	Madras Motor Race Track, Irungattukottai	22–24 January				2026–27 MRF Formula 2000 season is located in India
4	R2	Madras Motor Race Track, Irungattukottai	22–24 January				2026–27 MRF Formula 2000 season is located in India
4	R3	Madras Motor Race Track, Irungattukottai	22–24 January				2026–27 MRF Formula 2000 season is located in India
5	R1	Madras Motor Race Track, Irungattukottai	19–21 February				2026–27 MRF Formula 2000 season is located in India
5	R2	Madras Motor Race Track, Irungattukottai	19–21 February				2026–27 MRF Formula 2000 season is located in India
5	R3	Madras Motor Race Track, Irungattukottai	19–21 February				2026–27 MRF Formula 2000 season is located in India

== Season report ==
The 2026–27 season began at Madras Motor Race Track with pole position in qualifying for Saishiva Sankaran. All three races followed the same pattern: Sankaran dropped back after a slow getaway off the line, but was able to fight back up the order to claim victory in the end. He swept the weekend to lead the standings on 75 points, while three second places for Aditya Patnaik meant he was 18 points behind him, while Swarnav Das took two podiums and Krishay Gutte one to make up the rest of the points scorers.

Reigning champion Ishaan Madesh returned for round two, but was unable to deter Sankaran from continuing his win streak as the latter took pole position and converted it into victory ahead of Madesh and Gutte in race 1. Sankaran doubled up in race two, leading Madesh once again as Das took third, before Madesh was finally able to get past him in the third race. That saw him take his first victory of the season, elevating him to fourth in the standings as Gutte took third and Sankaran grew his lead to 48 points over Das.

Pole position for round three went to Madesh, and he converted it into an unchallenged lights-to-flag victory in the first race, leading from points leader Sankaran and Gutte. Race two saw a collision between Sankaran and Madesh, with the latter dropping to third, while Sankaran was handed a time penalty. That meant Gutte in secon, inherited victory as Sankaran dropped to third. In the third race, Madesh took another win despite a bad start as Sankaran led Gutte, stabilizing his standings lead at 42 points ahead of the field.

== Championship standings ==
Scoring system

Position	1st	2nd	3rd	4th	5th	6th	7th	8th	9th	10th
Points	25	19	17	15	12	10	8	6	4	2

Half points are awarded if less than five cars take part in a race.

Pos.	Driver	CHE1			CHE2			CHE3			CHE4	CHE5	Points
1	Saishiva Sankaran	**1**	1	1	**1**	1	2	2	3	2			199
2	Krishay Gutte	4	3	4	3	4	3	3	1	3			155
3	Swarnav Das	3	4	3	4	3	4	4	4	4			141
4	Ishaan Madesh				2	2	1	**1**	2	1			132
5	Aditya Patnaik	2	2	2									57
6	Raghul Rangasamy				5	5	5	Ret	DNS	DNS			36
—	Keith Desouza	Ret	DNS	Ret									0
Pos.	Driver	CHE1			CHE2			CHE3			CHE4	CHE5	Points

Colour	Result
Gold	Winner
Silver	Second place
Bronze	Third place
Green	Points classification
Blue	Non-points classification
Blue	Non-classified finish (NC)
Purple	Retired, not classified (Ret)
Red	Did not qualify (DNQ)
Red	Did not pre-qualify (DNPQ)
Black	Disqualified (DSQ)
White	Did not start (DNS)
White	Withdrew (WD)
White	Race cancelled (C)
Blank	Did not practice (DNP)
Blank	Did not arrive (DNA)
Blank	Excluded (EX)

**Bold** – Pole

Italics – Fastest Lap
