= Jagathishree Kumaresan =

Indian bike racer

Personal information
- Nationality: Indian
- Born: 2004 (age 21–22) Chennai, Tamil Nadu, India
- Education: BA in Archaeology, 2024
- Occupation: Professional motorcycle racer
- Years active: 2021–present

Sport
- Sport: Motorcycle racing
- Team: One Racing Team

Jagathishree Kumaresan (born 3 June 2004) is a motorcycle racer from Tamil Nadu. She competes in Indian National championships organised by the Federation of Motor Sports Clubs in India specialising in drag and road racing disciplines. She is a three time Indian national champion.

== Early life and education ==
Kumaresan is from Chennai, Tamil Nadu. She completed her Bachelor of Arts in archaeology at Madras Christian College in 2024.

== Career ==
Kumaresan started racing bikes and made her debut in the Indian National Motorcycle Championship in 2021. She won the Indian National Motorcycle Racing Championship 2024 in the Girls (Stock 165cc) category and later, won the Indian National Drag Racing Championship for the year 2024, in the ladies class. Both the Nationals were promoted and organised by Madras Motor Sports Club at the Madras International Circuit in Irungattukottai, near Chennai. In the drag Nationals, she won both the first and second rounds to lead the table in the ladies class in 2024. Later, she won the third round and clinched the title in the fourth and final round. She first took part and won the first round of the FMSCI drag national in 2023.

In August 2025, Kumaresan won both the races, representing One Racing team, in the second round at the Kari Motor Speedway, Coimbatore, in the Girls (Stock 165cc) category and also took first place in the Petronas TVS India One-Make Championship. In September 2025, she won both the races in the third round to lead the championship table in the Girls Stock 165cc class and also added one more race victory to top the Petronas TVS RTR 200 women's race at the Madras International Circuit. She retained the Indian National Motorcycle Championship in 2025.

=== International ===
Kumaaresan was selected by the Federation of Motor Sports Clubs of India (fmsci) to represent India in the FIM Asia Women's Cup of Circuit Racing (ACCR) in Thailand from 12 to 14 September 2025. As the reigning Indian road racing champion, she was selected again to represent fmsci as Team India and won a third place in the FIM ACCR 2026 at Thailand on 13 September 2026.
