= 2025–26 MRF Formula 2000 season =

Auto racing championship in India

The 2025–26 MRF Formula 2000 season was the eleventh running of the Formula 2000-level single-seater championship in India previously known as the MRF Challenge. This was the fifth season of the championship restarted in 2022 without support of the FIA and simply called MRF Formula 2000, with the field consisting of domestic drivers rather than foreign racers competing over the European and Northern American off-season.

The season began on 18 July 2025 and was run over four weekends until 25 January 2026. Ishaan Madesh won the championship title after a season-long battle with Arjun Chheda.

== Drivers ==
The following drivers, all of them Indian-registered, contested the championship:

No.	Driver	Rounds
1	Arjun Chheda	All
7	Chetan Korada	1
11	Tarun Muthiaiah	All
21	Akhil Agarwal	1
55	Ishaan Madesh	All
65	Shivesh Selvarathnam	All
75	Ethan Joy	2

== Race calendar and results ==
The 2025 season was initially set to feature five race weekends ranging from June to October of 2025. However, after the first round was not held, a revised calendar was announced that comprised four rounds from July of 2025 to January 2026. The season opener, held at Kari Motor Speedway, marked the series' first round held outside Madras Motor Race Track since 2020. Round three was rescheduled twice, from October to December and then to January.

Round		Circuit	Date	Pole position	Fastest lap	Winning driver	Support bill	Map of circuit locations
2025								2025–26 MRF Formula 2000 season is located in India
1	R1	Kari Motor Speedway, Chettipalayam	19 July	Ishaan Madesh	Ishaan Madesh	Arjun Chheda	Indian Touring Car National Championship; Indian Junior Touring Car National Championship; Polo Cup; Formula LGB 1300	2025–26 MRF Formula 2000 season is located in India
1	R2	Kari Motor Speedway, Chettipalayam	20 July		Ishaan Madesh	Ishaan Madesh	Indian Touring Car National Championship; Indian Junior Touring Car National Championship; Polo Cup; Formula LGB 1300	2025–26 MRF Formula 2000 season is located in India
1	R3	Kari Motor Speedway, Chettipalayam	20 July		Arjun Chheda	Arjun Chheda	Indian Touring Car National Championship; Indian Junior Touring Car National Championship; Polo Cup; Formula LGB 1300	2025–26 MRF Formula 2000 season is located in India
2	R1	Madras Motor Race Track, Irungattukottai	20 September	Arjun Chheda	Ishaan Madesh	Arjun Chheda	Indian Touring Car National Championship; Indian Junior Touring Car National Championship; Polo Cup; MRF Saloons	2025–26 MRF Formula 2000 season is located in India
2	R2	Madras Motor Race Track, Irungattukottai	21 September		Ishaan Madesh	Ishaan Madesh	Indian Touring Car National Championship; Indian Junior Touring Car National Championship; Polo Cup; MRF Saloons	2025–26 MRF Formula 2000 season is located in India
2	R3	Madras Motor Race Track, Irungattukottai	21 September		Ishaan Madesh	Ishaan Madesh	Indian Touring Car National Championship; Indian Junior Touring Car National Championship; Polo Cup; MRF Saloons	2025–26 MRF Formula 2000 season is located in India
2026								2025–26 MRF Formula 2000 season is located in India
3	R1	Madras Motor Race Track, Irungattukottai	4 January	Ishaan Madesh	Ishaan Madesh	Arjun Chheda	Indian Touring Car National Championship; Indian Junior Touring Car National Championship; Polo Cup; MRF Saloons	2025–26 MRF Formula 2000 season is located in India
3	R2	Madras Motor Race Track, Irungattukottai	5 January		Ishaan Madesh	Ishaan Madesh	Indian Touring Car National Championship; Indian Junior Touring Car National Championship; Polo Cup; MRF Saloons	2025–26 MRF Formula 2000 season is located in India
3	R3	Madras Motor Race Track, Irungattukottai	5 January		Ishaan Madesh	Arjun Chheda	Indian Touring Car National Championship; Indian Junior Touring Car National Championship; Polo Cup; MRF Saloons	2025–26 MRF Formula 2000 season is located in India
4	R1	Madras Motor Race Track, Irungattukottai	24 January	Ishaan Madesh	Arjun Chheda	Ishaan Madesh	Indian Touring Car National Championship; Indian Junior Touring Car National Championship; Polo Cup; Formula LGB 1300	2025–26 MRF Formula 2000 season is located in India
4	R2	Madras Motor Race Track, Irungattukottai	25 January		Ishaan Madesh	Ishaan Madesh	Indian Touring Car National Championship; Indian Junior Touring Car National Championship; Polo Cup; Formula LGB 1300	2025–26 MRF Formula 2000 season is located in India
4	R3	Madras Motor Race Track, Irungattukottai	25 January		Ishaan Madesh	Ishaan Madesh	Indian Touring Car National Championship; Indian Junior Touring Car National Championship; Polo Cup; Formula LGB 1300	2025–26 MRF Formula 2000 season is located in India

== Season report ==
The 2025–26 season began with six cars entering the championship's first round, held at Kari Motor Speedway. Ishaan Madesh claimed pole position in qualifying before stalling at the start of the opening race. He was able to recover to second ahead of Shivesh Selvarathnam, but the win went to Arjun Chheda. Madesh bounced back to win race two ahead of Chheda and Akhil Agarwal, before Chheda doubled up in race three to win again and take the lead in the standings. Madesh came second again, with Agarwal third.

Three rounds at Madras Motor Race Track followed, and Chheda claimed pole position for the first of them. He converted that into a victory to further expand his points lead, with debutant Ethan Joy taking second place and Madesh coming third. Races two and three of the weekend saw identical podiums: Madesh used the second race's reverse grid to win ahead of points leader Chheda before taking another victory in race three to close right up to him in the standings. Tarun Muthiaiah took third place on both occasions.

Entry numbers shrunk to four cars in 2026, and Madesh took the second pole position of his campaign in qualifying. A poor start to the first race saw him lose the lead to Chheda, who held on to take victory. Madesh had to be content with second ahead of Muthiaiah. He was able to use the reversed-grid in race two to bounce back and take victory, with Chheda this time consigned to second and Muthiaiah once again third. Race three saw the order of the top two switch once again, allowing Chheda to build a five-point lead.

The final round of the season saw Madesh once again go fastest in qualifying to take pole position. He followed that up with a win ahead of Chheda and Selvarathnam to reduce Chheda's championship to just two points going into the final day. Two more wins for Madesh followed on Sunday, with his clean sweep allowing him to take the championship title. Chheda came second on both occasions to finish the season four points behind the champion as third places were shared between Selvarathnam and Muthiaiah.

== Championship standings ==
Scoring system

Position	1st	2nd	3rd	4th	5th	6th
Points	25	19	17	15	12	10

Half points were awarded if less than five cars took part in a race.

Pos.	Driver	KAR			CHE1			CHE2			CHE3			Points
1	Ishaan Madesh	**2**	1	2	3	1	1	**2***	1*	2*	**1***	1*	1*	199
2	Arjun Chheda	1	2	1	**1**	2	2	1*	2*	1*	2*	2*	2*	195
3	Tarun Muthiaiah	5	4	5	4	3	3	3*	3*	4*	4*	4*	3*	136
4	Shivesh Selvarathnam	3	5	6	5	5	5	4*	4*	3*	3*	3*	4*	123
5	Ethan Joy				2	4	4							49
6	Akhil Agarwal	4	3	3										49
7	Chetan Korada	6	6	4										35
Pos.	Driver	KAR			CHE1			CHE2			CHE3			Points

Colour	Result
Gold	Winner
Silver	Second place
Bronze	Third place
Green	Points classification
Blue	Non-points classification
Blue	Non-classified finish (NC)
Purple	Retired, not classified (Ret)
Red	Did not qualify (DNQ)
Red	Did not pre-qualify (DNPQ)
Black	Disqualified (DSQ)
White	Did not start (DNS)
White	Withdrew (WD)
White	Race cancelled (C)
Blank	Did not practice (DNP)
Blank	Did not arrive (DNA)
Blank	Excluded (EX)

**Bold** – Pole

Italics – Fastest Lap
