= Ishaan Madesh =

Indian motorsports athlete

Personal information
- Nationality: Indian
- Born: Bengaluru, Karnataka, India
- Years active: 2019–present

Sport
- Country: India
- Sport: Motorsport
- Team: Peregrine Racing

Ishaan Madesh (born 17 December 2008) is an Indian racing driver from Karnataka. He is an eight-time Indian national karting champion. He takes part in three different formats, Indian National Karting championship, Indian National Car Racing Championship and FIA F4 Indian Championship which is part of Indian Racing League.

== Early life and education ==
Madesh is born in Bengaluru. He represents Peregrine Racing team in the Indian karting nationals. His father Madesh runs a team in the Karting nationals and his elder, Rohaan Madesh, is also an Indian national karting champion.

== Career ==
Madesh made his debut in 2018 as a nine-year old at Bengaluru's Meco Kartopia track. He started his motorsports career in the Rotax Max Meco fmsci Indian National Karting Championship and moved to racing Formula cars in 2025 after winning seven karting titles in Rotax Max Nationals and X30 Nationals. He began racing cars in the MRF MMSC fmsci Indian National Car Racing Championship in 2025. In July 2025, he took part in Round 1 at the Madras International Circuit and won Race 2 in the Formula 2000 category, the main class of the championship which was held along with other classes like F1600 and Indian Touring Class. Later in 2025, he continued taking part in the Indian karting nationals in the Senior Max class. In the second round at the CoASITT circuit in Coimbatore, he beat his elder brother to win both the pre-finals and finals.

In 2020, Madesh got his first Indian national title winning the Meco fmsci Rotax Max Indian National Karting Championship in the Micro Max class with victories and fastest laps in three rounds. In 2020, he also won the fmsci X30 Nationals winning all the rounds except round 2.

On 29 October 2023, Madesh added another Indian National Karting title winning the Meco-Fmsci Rotax Max National Karting Championship 2023 in the Junior Max class and qualified to represent Indian in the Rotax Max Challenge grand finals in Bahrain in December 2023.

In 2018, Madesh won the Rotax Max Indian National Karting Championship in the Micro Max class his first National title. He also qualified and took part in the IAME X30 World Finals and ROTAX World Finals in 2018 at Brazil from 24 November to 1 December.

In 2025, Madesh was named in the Kolkata Royal Tigers to race in the Formula 4 and Indian Racing League. In August 2025, he began with a third place in Race 1 and a victory in Race 2 in F4 India Round 1 at Kari Speedway at Coimbatore. On 6 October 2025, he raced in the third leg of the Indian Racing League at the Kari Motor Speedway in Coimbatore in the FIA Formula 4 Indian Championship and won a third place in Race 1 followed by a victory in Race 2. Overall in his debut season in F4 Indian championship in 2025, he claimed three wins, eight podiums and scored a third-place finish to become the highest-ranked Indian.

On 9 November 2025, Madesh won the Senior title in the Meco fmsci Indian National Karting Championship for Rotax Max Classes 2025 at the final round held at Meco Kartopia in Bengaluru.

== International career ==
Madesh made his international debut in April 2019, when he took part in the 30th edition of the Andrea Margutti Trophy in the mini category and raced for Formula K Junior team. In 2019, he also took part in the WSK Euro Series, also with Formula K Junior team in 60 mini class. In the same year, he represented India in the Rotax Max Championship grand finals with Dan Holland Racing team.

In 2022, Madesh represented Team India in the FIA Motorsport Games in the junior category of karting sprint and finished 16th.

== Racing record ==
=== Racing career summary ===
Season	Series	Team	Races	Wins	Poles	F/Laps	Podiums	Points	Position
2025	F4 Indian Championship	Kolkata Royal Tigers	15	3	1	3	7	142	**3rd**
2025-26	MRF Formula 2000	MRF Racing	12	7	3	10	12	199	**1st**
2025-26	Indian Racing League	Speed Demons Delhi							

=== Complete F4 Indian Championship results ===
(key) (Races in bold indicate pole position) (Races in italics indicate fastest lap)

Year	Entrant	1	2	3	4	5	6	7	8	9	10	11	12	13	14	15	Pos	Points
2025	Kolkata Royal Tigers	KAR1; 1; 3	KAR1; 2; 1	**MAD1**; **1**; 8	MAD1; 2; 1	MAD1; 3; 3	MAD1; 4; 8	KAR2; 1; 5	KAR2; 2 Ret	KAR2; 3; 3	KAR2; 4; 1	KAR3; 1; 4	KAR3; 2; 3	KAR3; 3; 4	MAD2; 1; 6	MAD2; 2; 4	3rd	142
