= Sholavaram =

Neighborhood in Chennai, India

Sholavaram Cholavaram
- Suburb
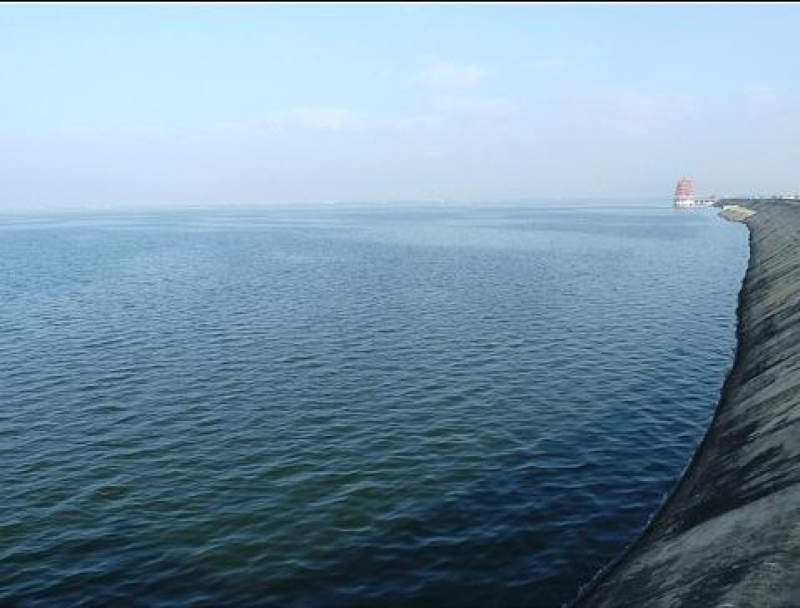
- Sholavaram Lake

- Location within Chennai Location within Tamil Nadu
- Coordinates: 13°14′07″N 80°09′49″E
- Country: India
- State: Tamil Nadu
- District: Tiruvallur
- Metro: Chennai
- Elevation: 19 m (62 ft)

Languages
  - Official: Tamil
- Time zone: UTC+5:30 (IST)
- PIN: 600 067
- Telephone code: 044
- Planning agency: CMDA
- Lok Sabha constituency: Tiruvallur
- Tamil Nadu Assembly constituency: Madavaram

Cholavaram, also spelled Sholavaram, is a suburb 24 km (15 mi) north of Chennai, Tamil Nadu, India. It is popular as Sholavaram and is also known for the Cholavaram lake.

The Sholavaram Airstrip was operated by the Royal Air Force during World War II. When the Madras Motor Sports Club was formed in mid-1950s, it selected the airstrip to conduct its racing events.. Since then racing events took place every year In the late 1980s, the club moved to the new Madras Motor Race Track in Irungattukottai, Sriperumbudur.

The Malayalam actor Jayan was killed in a helicopter accident here during the shooting of his film Kolilakkam on 16 November 1980.

== See also ==
- Chennai International Airport
