= 2025 F4 Indian Championship =

Motor racing championship

The 2025 F4 Indian Championship was the third season of the F4 Indian Championship. It was a motor racing championship for open wheel, formula racing cars regulated according to FIA Formula 4 regulations. The season commenced on 15 August at Kari Motor Speedway and finished at Madras International Circuit on 14 December.

== Drivers ==
All cars were run by Racing Promotions Private Limited.

Team	No.	Driver	Class	Rounds
Kichcha's Kings Bengaluru	5	(Austria) Clara Stiebleichinger		All
Kichcha's Kings Bengaluru	19	(France) Sachel Rotgé		All
Goa Aces JA Racing	11	(South Africa) Luviwe Sambudla		All
Goa Aces JA Racing	23	(South Africa) Mahlori Mabunda		2–5
Ahmedabad Apex Racers	14	(India) Arjun Chheda		4
Ahmedabad Apex Racers	17	(Japan) Itsuki Sato		3
Ahmedabad Apex Racers	20	(Australia) Paige Raddatz		3–5
Hyderabad Blackbirds	16	(Australia) Annabel Kennedy		All
Hyderabad Blackbirds	36	(South Africa) Enzo Rujugiro		3–5
Hyderabad Blackbirds	96	(Greece) Vasileios Apostolidis		1–2
Godspeed Kochi	22	(Australia) Zakariya Mohammed		1–2
Godspeed Kochi	37	(South Africa) Wian Boshoff		1–3, 5
Godspeed Kochi	53	(Australia) Aris Kyriakou		4–5
Godspeed Kochi	75	(India) Ethan Joy		3
Speed Demons Delhi	33	(India) Saishiva Sankaran		All
Speed Demons Delhi	77	(South Africa) Ntiyiso Mabunda		All
Chennai Turbo Riders	44	(India) Veer Sheth		3–5
Chennai Turbo Riders	56	(Kenya) Shane Chandaria		All
Chennai Turbo Riders	67	(Singapore) Kareen Kaur		1–2
Kolkata Royal Tigers	65	(Mozambique) Ghazi Motlekar		All
Kolkata Royal Tigers	66	(India) Ishaan Madesh		All

Icon	Legend
R	Rookie

=== Indian F4 Global Shootout Program ===
Racing Promotions Private Limited announced in May 2024 the F4 Global Shootout Program offering scholarships towards the participation in the championship. The estimated cost of the full season of the series is €120,000 and the winner of the shootout would get a fully paid seat in the upcoming season. The runner-up and the third placed driver would get 30% and 20% respectively of the winner's scholarship while each of other finalists would be awarded €15,000. The 2025 program was held on 23–25 June at the Circuit du Var, France, in the partnership with the driving school AGS Formule 1. The following twelve drivers were selected:

- (France) Aurelien Agnes
- (Kenya) Shane Chandaria
- (United Kingdom) Maltina Jashari
- (Poland) Kristine Kolodziejski
- (Australia) Aris Kyriakou
- (France) Mathéo Lienard
- (United States) Caitlyn McDaniel
- (France) Sachel Rotgé
- (India) Raiden Samervel
- (Sweden) Milla Sjöstrand
- (South Korea) Song Harim
- (Lithuania) Linas Volungevičius

Sachel Rotgé was declared the winner of the shootout.

== Calendar ==
All events were held in India and run in tandem with the Indian Racing League. The provisional schedule was announced on 9 July 2025, with a street race in Goa added on 10 September 2025. One month later, the competition on 1–2 November in Mormugao was postponed and moved after the protests of the local community, ultimately replaced by races at the Kari Motor Speedway. The final round was scheduled to take place at another brand-new street circuit in Navi Mumbai, but another change of calendar saw it being moved to the Madras International Circuit.

Round		Circuit	Date	Pole position	Fastest lap	Winning driver	Winning team
1	R1	Kari Motor Speedway, Coimbatore	17 August	(Greece) Vasileios Apostolidis	(Mozambique) Ghazi Motlekar	(Greece) Vasileios Apostolidis	Hyderabad Blackbirds
1	R2	Kari Motor Speedway, Coimbatore	17 August		(Greece) Vasileios Apostolidis	(India) Ishaan Madesh	Kolkata Royal Tigers
2	R1	Madras International Circuit, Chennai (Full Circuit)	23 August	(India) Ishaan Madesh (Note: Chandaria was the fastest in the qualifying session but served a five-place grid penalty from the previous race. Madesh inherited the pole position, but Chandaria kept the 2 points.)	(India) Ishaan Madesh	(France) Sachel Rotgé	Kichcha's Kings Bengaluru
2	R2	Madras International Circuit, Chennai (Full Circuit)	24 August		(India) Ishaan Madesh	(India) Ishaan Madesh	Kolkata Royal Tigers
2	R3	Madras International Circuit, Chennai (Full Circuit)	24 August	(Kenya) Shane Chandaria	(Kenya) Shane Chandaria	(Kenya) Shane Chandaria	Chennai Turbo Riders
2	R4	Madras International Circuit, Chennai (Full Circuit)	24 August		(India) Ishaan Madesh	(France) Sachel Rotgé	Kichcha's Kings Bengaluru
3	R1	Kari Motor Speedway, Coimbatore	4 October	(Japan) Itsuki Sato (Note: Chandaria was the fastest in the qualifying session but served a five-place grid penalty from the previous race. Sato inherited the pole position, but Chandaria kept the 2 points.)	(Japan) Itsuki Sato	(Japan) Itsuki Sato	Ahmedabad Apex Racers
3	R2	Kari Motor Speedway, Coimbatore	5 October		(Kenya) Shane Chandaria	(Kenya) Shane Chandaria	Chennai Turbo Riders
3	R3	Kari Motor Speedway, Coimbatore	5 October	(Kenya) Shane Chandaria	(Kenya) Shane Chandaria	(Japan) Itsuki Sato	Ahmedabad Apex Racers
3	R4	Kari Motor Speedway, Coimbatore	5 October		(Mozambique) Ghazi Motlekar	(India) Ishaan Madesh	Kolkata Royal Tigers
4	R1	Kari Motor Speedway, Coimbatore	15 November	(Kenya) Shane Chandaria	(France) Sachel Rotgé	(France) Sachel Rotgé	Kichcha's Kings Bengaluru
4	R2	Kari Motor Speedway, Coimbatore	16 November		(Australia) Aris Kyriakou	(South Africa) Luviwe Sambudla	Goa Aces JA Racing
4	R3	Kari Motor Speedway, Coimbatore	16 November	(Kenya) Shane Chandaria	(Kenya) Shane Chandaria	(Kenya) Shane Chandaria	Chennai Turbo Riders
5	R1	Madras International Circuit, Chennai (Short Circuit)	14 December	(Kenya) Shane Chandaria	(Kenya) Shane Chandaria	(France) Sachel Rotgé	Kichcha's Kings Bengaluru
5	R2	Madras International Circuit, Chennai (Short Circuit)	14 December		(India) Veer Sheth	(South Africa) Luviwe Sambudla	Goa Aces JA Racing

== Championship standings ==
Points were awarded as follows:

Races	Position, points per race										
Races	**1st**	**2nd**	**3rd**	**4th**	**5th**	**6th**	**7th**	**8th**	**9th**	**10th**	**FL**
Qualifying	2										
Races 1 & 3	25	18	15	12	10	8	6	4	2	1	1
Races 2 & 4	10	9	8	7	6	5	4	3	2	1	1

=== Drivers' Championship ===
Pos	Driver	KAR1		MAD1				KAR2				KAR3			MAD2		Pts
Pos	Driver	R1	R2	R1	R2	R3	R4	R1	R2	R3	R4	R1	R2	R3	R1	R2	Pts
1	(Kenya) Shane Chandaria	2	5	Ret	7	**1**	4	6	1	**5**	3	**3**	5	**1**	**2**	3	186
2	(France) Sachel Rotgé	4	2	1	2	4	1	7	4	Ret	8	1	Ret	3	1	2	169
3	(India) Ishaan Madesh	3	1	**8**	1	3	8	5	Ret	3	1	4	3	4	6	4	142
4	(Mozambique) Ghazi Motlekar	8	4	2	3	7	6	2	7	14	4	2	2	2	Ret	Ret	124
5	(India) Saishiva Sankaran	7	11	Ret	4	2	3	3	5	6	2	5	4	5	Ret	5	110
6	(South Africa) Luviwe Sambudla	10	Ret	Ret	6	5	2	4	2	2	9	6	1	12	5	1	104
7	(Japan) Itsuki Sato							**1**	3	1	7						63
8	(South Africa) Ntiyiso Mabunda	6	12†	10	5	11	5	10	10	4	16	10	12	7	8	6	51
9	(South Africa) Wian Boshoff	5	7	5	13	8	13†	12†	9	7	11				4	Ret	48
10	(India) Veer Sheth							13	6	Ret	5	7	6	6	3	11	46
11	(Austria) Clara Stiebleichinger	9	6	4	11	9	7	Ret	14	8	15	12	9	8	10	7	40
12	(Greece) Vasileios Apostolidis	**1**	3	WD	WD	WD	WD										36
13	(Australia) Annabel Kennedy	12	8	3	8	13	9	8	11	12	12	13	8	11	DNS	DNS	30
14	(South Africa) Mahlori Mabunda			6	12	10	10	14	13	10	13	Ret	11	10	9	8	17
15	(Australia) Zakariya Mohammed	11	9	9	9	6	11										14
16	(Australia) Aris Kyriakou											Ret	7	9	7	Ret	13
17	(India) Ethan Joy							9	12	9	6						9
18	(Singapore) Kareen Kaur	13	10	7	10	12	12										8
19	(Australia) Paige Raddatz							11	8	11	10	9	Ret	Ret	11	9	8
20	(India) Arjun Chheda											8	13	Ret			4
21	(South Africa) Enzo Rujugiro							15	15	13	14	11	10	13	12	10	2
Pos	Driver	R1	R2	R1	R2	R3	R4	R1	R2	R3	R4	R1	R2	R3	R1	R2	Pts
Pos	Driver	KAR1		MAD1				KAR2				KAR3			MAD2		Pts

Colour	Result
Gold	Winner
Silver	Second place
Bronze	Third place
Green	Points classification
Blue	Non-points classification
Blue	Non-classified finish (NC)
Purple	Retired, not classified (Ret)
Red	Did not qualify (DNQ)
Red	Did not pre-qualify (DNPQ)
Black	Disqualified (DSQ)
White	Did not start (DNS)
White	Withdrew (WD)
White	Race cancelled (C)
Blank	Did not practice (DNP)
Blank	Did not arrive (DNA)
Blank	Excluded (EX)

**Bold** – Pole
Italics – Fastest Lap
† — Did not finish, but classified
Rookie
