= Itsuki Sato =

Japanese racing driver (born 2002)

- 佐藤樹
- Born: Itsuki Sato; 3 December 2002 (age 23); Kanagawa Prefecture, Japan
- Nationality: (Japan) Japanese

F4 Japanese Championship career
- Debut season: 2022
- Current team: HYDRANGEA Kageyama Racing
- Car number: 17
- Former teams: Rn-sports, HELM Motorsports, Drago Corse
- Starts: 46
- Wins: 5
- Podiums: 11
- Poles: 3
- Fastest laps: 7
- Best finish: 2nd in 2025

Championship titles
- 2022 2021: JAF Japan Formula 4 Motegi and Sugo FJ Championship
- Statistics up to date as of December 1, 2026.

Itsuki Sato (佐藤 樹, Satō Itsuki; born 3 December 2002) is a Japanese racing driver who last competed in the F4 Japanese Championship for HYDRANGEA Kageyama Racing and Porsche Carrera Cup Japan as a Porsche Japan junior driver.

== Career ==
Sato began karting at the age of three, mainly racing in Rotax-run championships across Japan. Most of Sato's early career was spent with Super Chips Racing Service, with whom he finished runner-up with in the 2013 Mobara West Cup's Mini Rok standings, staying with them until his first year in Senior Rotax in 2017.

Sato then moved to HRS Japan from 2018 onwards, most notably finishing third in both the 2019 RMC Japan Festival and the 2020 Kart Race In Suzuka series and also briefly competed in Europe by competing in the Rotax Max Euro Trophy in 2019.

Stepping up to single-seaters in 2021, Sato competed in the Motegi and Sugo FJ Series for RiNoA Racing Project. Sato won four races to clinch the title by 25 points over Shinnosuke Ito at the penultimate round at Motegi.

Sato moved to Formula Beat for 2022, in which he missed the round at Tokachi but clinched the title at the season-ending Suzuka round after winning all but three races he contested. During 2022 Sato made two one-off appearances in Japanese F4, racing for Rn-sports in the season-opening round at Fuji and HELM Motorsports at Sugo, taking a best result of 14th in the latter round. Sato was also one of four finalists in the Honda Racing School Suzuka Circuit, alongside Tosei Moriyama, Hironobu Shimizu and Shuma Shimakage.

Following his Formula Beat title, Sato remained with HELM Motorsports to race in Japanese F4 full-time in 2023. In his first full season in the series, Sato took a best result of sixth twice, scored at both Fuji and Suzuka, en route to 13th in points.

In 2024, Sato switched to Drago Corse as he remained in Japanese F4 for his sophomore season. In his second season in Japanese F4, Sato scored his maiden series podium at Fuji, which helped him to finish 12th in the overall standings at season's end.

Sato returned to Japanese F4, switching to HYDRANGEA Kageyama Racing for his third full season in the series, while he also competing in Porsche Carrera Cup Japan as Porsche Japan's junior driver. In the former, Sato began the season with a podium in race two at Fuji before taking his maiden series win in race three, and following that up by winning both races in the second Fuji round. Sato then scored wins at Suzuka and Sugo as well as four more podiums to end the year runner-up in points. During 2025, Sato also raced in the FIA F4 World Cup, and made a one-off appearance in the F4 Indian Championship at Kari, in which he won twice.

After not racing for much of 2026, Sato joined Bionic Jack Racing to contest the final round of that year's Porsche Carrera Cup Japan season at Fuji, finishing fifth in both races.

== Karting record ==
=== Karting career summary ===
Season	Series	Team	Position
2010	HarunaCup KartRace – Koma 60	Super Chips	
2011	HarunaCup KartRace – Koma 60	Super Chips	
2012	Mobara West Cup – Mini Rok	Super Chips	5th
2013	Rotax Max Challenge Japan – Max Cadet	Super Chips	37th
2013	Mobara West Cup – Mini Rok	Super Chips	2nd
2014	Motegi Kart Race – Yamaha Cadet Open	Super Chips	8th
2017	Rotax Max Challenge Japan – Senior Max	Super Chips	37th
2017	Rotax Max Challenge Japan Festival – Senior Max	Super Chips	DNQ
2017	Rotax Max Challenge Japan Festival – XPS Cup	Super Chips	19th
2018	Rotax Max Challenge Mizunami Series – Senior Max	HRS Japan	9th
2018	Kart Race In Suzuka – Senior Max	HRS Japan	20th
2018	Rotax Max Challenge Japan – Senior Max	HRS Japan	36th
2018	Rotax Max Challenge Japan Festival – Senior Max	HRS Japan	28th
2019	Rotax Max Euro Trophy – Senior Max	Daems Racing Team	47th
2019	Rotax Max Challenge Mizunami Series – Senior Max	HRS Japan	10th
2019	Kart Race In Suzuka – Senior Max	HRS Japan	5th
2019	Rotax Max Challenge Japan – Senior Max	HRS Japan	32nd
2019	Rotax Max Challenge Japan Festival – Senior Max	HRS Japan	3rd
2020	Kart Race In Suzuka – Senior Max	HRS Japan	3rd
2020	Rotax Max Challenge Mizunami Series – Senior Max	HRS Japan	8th
2020	Rotax Max Challenge Japan – Senior Max	HRS Japan	18th
2020	Rotax Max Challenge Japan Festival – Senior Max	HRS Japan	4th
2021	Rotax Max Challenge Mizunami Series – Senior Max	HRS Japan	13th
2021	Rotax Max Challenge Japan – Senior Max	HRS Japan	43rd
2021	Rotax Max Challenge Japan Festival – Senior Max	HRS Japan	DNQ

== Racing record ==
=== Racing career summary ===
Season	Series	Team	Races	Wins	Poles	FLaps	Podiums	Points	Position
2021	Motegi and Sugo FJ Championship	RiNoA Racing Project	5	4	5	2	5	100	**1st**
2022	JAF Japan Formula 4	Marusan Mist	10	7	5	7	10	182	**1st**
2022	F4 Japanese Championship	Rn-sports	2	0	0	0	0	0	25th
2022	F4 Japanese Championship	HELM Motorsports	2	0	0	0	0	0	25th
2023	F4 Japanese Championship	HELM Motorsports	14	0	0	0	0	27	13th
2024	F4 Japanese Championship	Drago Corse	14	0	0	0	1	37	12th
2025	F4 Japanese Championship	HYDRANGEA Kageyama Racing	14	5	3	7	10	212.5	**2nd**
2025	Porsche Carrera Cup Japan	Porsche Japan	11	0	0	0	0	117	6th
2025	F4 Indian Championship	Ahmedabad Apex Racers	4	2	1	1	3	63	7th
2025	FIA F4 World Cup		1	0	0	0	0	—N/a	DNF
2026	Porsche Carrera Cup Japan	Bionic Jack Racing	2	0	0	0	0	24	13th

=== Complete F4 Japanese Championship results ===
(key) (Races in bold indicate pole position) (Races in italics indicate fastest lap)

Year	Team	1	2	3	4	5	6	7	8	9	10	11	12	13	14	DC	Pts
2022	Rn-sports	FUJ1; 1; 21	FUJ1; 2; 18	SUZ; 1	SUZ; 2	FUJ2; 1	FUJ2; 2	SUZ2; 1	SUZ2; 2							25th	0
2022	HELM Motorsports									SUG; 1; 14	SUG; 2; 15	AUT; 1	AUT; 2	MOT; 1	MOT; 2	25th	0
2023	HELM Motorsports	FUJ1; 1; 28	FUJ1; 2; 6	SUZ; 1; 6	SUZ; 2; 13	FUJ2; 1; 9	FUJ2; 2; 9	SUZ2; 1; 10	SUZ2; 2; 11	SUG; 1; 9	SUG; 2; 12	AUT; 1; 12	AUT; 2; 11	MOT; 1; 9	MOT; 2; 9	13th	27
2024	Drago Corse	FUJ1; 1 Ret	FUJ1; 2; 3	SUZ; 1; 10	SUZ; 2; 11	FUJ2; 1; 9	FUJ2; 2; 10	SUG; 1; 11	SUG; 2; 12	AUT; 1; 10	MOT; 1; 8	MOT; 2; 10	MOT; 3; 5	SUZ2; 1; 13	SUZ2; 2; 9	12th	37
2025	HYDRANGEA Kageyama Racing	FUJ1; 1; 11	FUJ1; 2; 2	FUJ1; 3; 1	**FUJ2**; **1**; 1	**FUJ2**; **2**; 1	SUZ; 1; 1	SUZ; 2; 2	SUG; 1; 2	SUG; 2; 2	SUG; 3; 1	AUT; 1; 2	AUT; 2; 5	MOT; 1 Ret	**MOT**; **2**; 14	2nd	212.5

=== Complete F4 Indian Championship results ===
(key) (Races in bold indicate pole position) (Races in italics indicate fastest lap)

Year	Entrant	1	2	3	4	5	6	7	8	9	10	11	12	13	14	15	Pos	Points
2025	Ahmedabad Apex Racers	KAR1; 1	KAR1; 2	MAD1; 1	MAD1; 2	MAD1; 3	MAD1; 4	**KAR2**; **1**; 1	KAR2; 2; 3	KAR2; 3; 1	KAR2; 4; 7	KAR3; 1	KAR3; 2	KAR3; 3	MAD2; 1	MAD2; 2	7th	63

=== Complete FIA F4 World Cup results ===
Year	Car	Qualifying	Quali Race	Main Race
2025	Mygale M21-F4	14th	8th	DNF
