= Cholavaram Airstrip =

Abandoned Indian airstrip

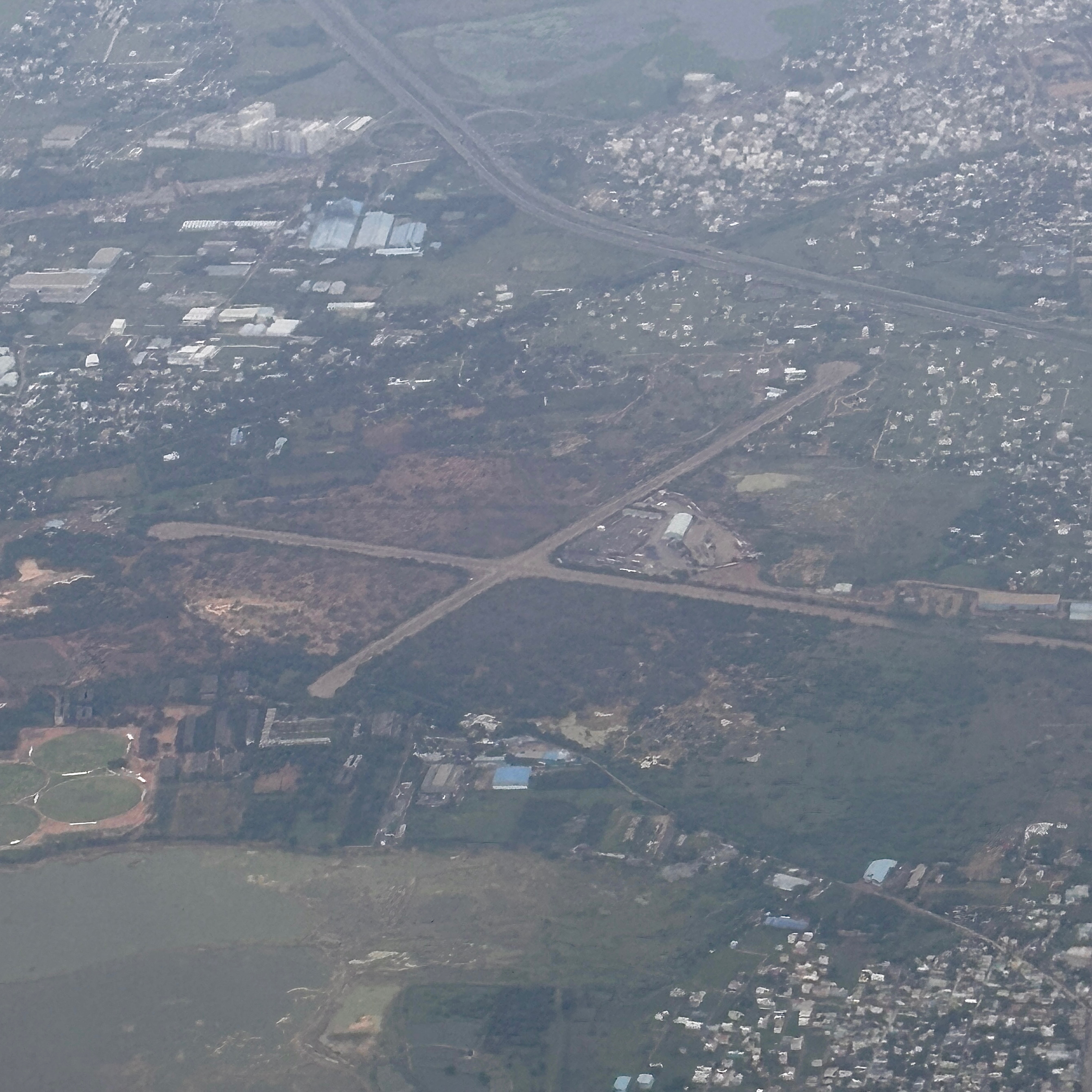
Aerial view of Sholavaram airfield

The Cholavaram Airstrip, or Sholavaram Airstrip, is an unused airstrip near Cholavaram, Chennai, India. It was originally operated by the Royal Air Force as an airbase during World War II for anti-submarine warfare. After the war, the airstrip lay abandoned until the 1950s, when it was turned into a motor racetrack by the Madras Motor Sports Club. In the late 1980s, the club moved to the new Madras Motor Race Track at Irungattukottai, Sriperumbudur.

The Malayalam actor Jayan was killed in a helicopter accident here during the shooting of his film Kolilakkam on 16 November 1980.

In 2016, the airstrip was identified for operation of regional flights by the Government of India under the UDAN scheme. However, due to lack of interest from airlines, the Sholavaram site was not included in phase three of the UDAN scheme.

In March 2019, the Indian Air Force began the process of retrieving encroached portions of land belonging to the airstrip. Around 50 acres of land was retrieved. The British-era airfield was spread across 350 acres, but had shrunk to 150 acres due to encroachment. The IAF at that time had said that it was planning to station a few attack helicopters at the airstrip and also looking at the possibility of setting up its first east coast air surveillance base at Sholavaram. The Tamilnadu Government was also looking at setting up a UAS (Unmanned Aircraft System) training range. As of now the airstrip is used by locals for flying RC planes, helicopters and drones.
