= 2025 FIA F4 World Cup =

Motor racing competition

2025年國際汽聯四級方程式世界盃
Next race →

Race details
- Date: 16 November 2025
- Official name: 2025 Macau Formula 4 Race – FIA F4 World Cup
- Location: Guia Circuit, Macau
- Course: Temporary street circuit
- Course length: 6.120 km (3.803 mi)
- Distance: 10 laps, 61.200 km (38.028 mi)
- Weather: Clear
- Attendance: 116,000

Pole position
- Driver: (Italy) Emanuele Olivieri
- Grid positions set by heat results

Fastest lap
- Driver: (United States) Sebastian Wheldon
- Time: 2:24.425 on lap 6

Podium
- First: (France) Jules Roussel
- Second: (Italy) Emanuele Olivieri
- Third: (Japan) Rintaro Sato

The 2025 FIA F4 World Cup (Chinese: 2025年國際汽聯四級方程式世界盃), officially the 2025 Macau Formula 4 Race – FIA F4 World Cup, was a motor race for Formula 4 (F4) cars held on the Guia Circuit, a street circuit in Macau, on 16 November 2025. A support race for the 2025 Macau Grand Prix, it was the inaugural edition of the FIA F4 World Cup and the fifth F4 race held on the streets of Macau.

Organised by the Sports Bureau of the Macao SAR Government, the event featured a timed qualifying session prior to an eight-lap qualification race, which decided the grid for the 10-lap main event. The entrants were selected by the Fédération Internationale de l'Automobile (FIA), featuring seven former or reigning F4 champions amongst a 20-driver field. Over 116,000 spectators were in attendance across the four-day weekend.

Sebastian Wheldon took pole position—over reigning Italian and E4 champion Kean Nakamura-Berta—for the qualification race, where both retired on lap one to enable Middle East champion Emanuele Olivieri's victory and subsequent pole for the main event. Frenchmen Jules Roussel and Rayan Caretti passed Olivieri early in the final, trading the lead until Caretti crashed on lap eight. Roussel claimed the World Cup behind the safety car, ahead of Olivieri and Rintaro Sato.

== Background ==
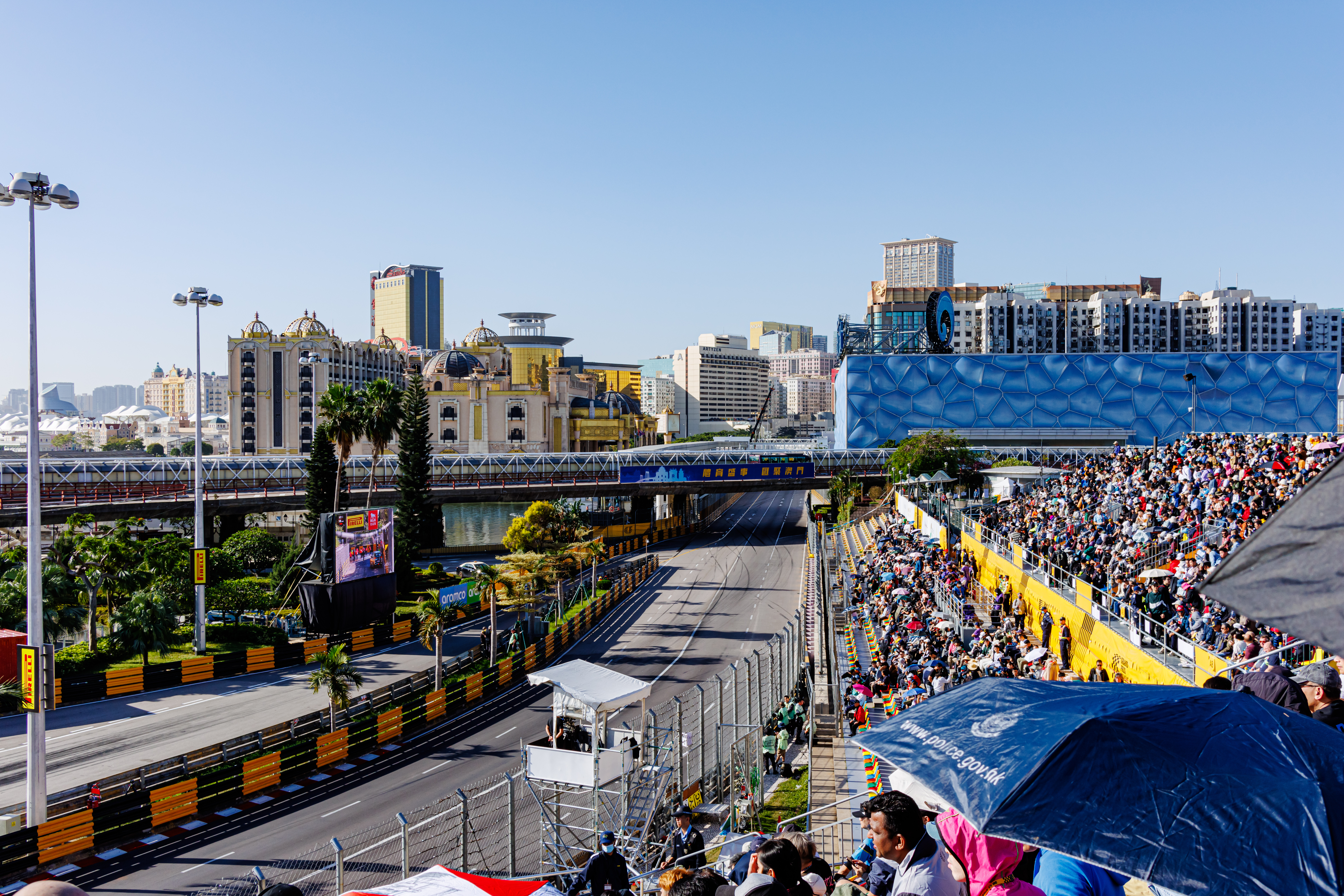
Formula 4 had been contested at the Macau Grand Prix weekend four times: three as the main event from 2020 to 2022 and once as the Macau Formula 4 Race.

Open-wheel racing has been contested on the streets of Macau since the debut of Formula Libre in the 1961 edition of the Macau Grand Prix, which was held under Formula Three (F3) regulations from 1983 onwards. In 2013, the Fédération Internationale de l'Automobile (FIA) created the Formula 4 (F4) category upon approval from the FIA World Motor Sport Council (WMSC), which formed the first stage of the FIA Global Pathway from Karting to Formula One and reduced the minimum age for formula racing to 15. The FIA granted World Cup–status to the Macau Grand Prix in 2016. The discussions for an F4 World Cup in Macau was first proposed by Gerhard Berger and the WMSC launched a call for promoters under Stefano Domenicali in 2016; later that year, the FIA requested a trademark for an "F4 World Final" from the Economic Services Bureau of Macau, which was valid from 2017 to 2024.

The COVID-19 pandemic forced the cancellation of the F3 World Cup in 2020 as drivers from the FIA Formula 3 Championship were unable to travel to compete; instead, the event was contested under F4 regulations for the first time as a non-championship round of the F4 Chinese Championship. It remained as such in 2021 and 2022, until the return of F3. The 2023 edition featured a support race in F4—the Macau Formula 4 Race—which formed a non-championship round of the F4 South East Asia Championship and was won by Arvid Lindblad. The return of F4 to Macau as the inaugural FIA F4 World Cup was approved by the WMSC and announced by the FIA in May 2025 as a support race for the 2025 Macau Grand Prix in Formula Regional (FR) and the 2025 FIA GT World Cup in GT3.

Macau is an essential part of the education of a young driver, and we have a duty to protect its legacy and its future. There are so few challenges like the Macau Grand Prix left that we felt it was the right moment to introduce the FIA F4 World Cup. It will give the best drivers coming from the national level an opportunity to learn what it takes to drive the Guia Circuit in an F4 car, which is a bit more forgiving than an FR car, so that when they come back in one or two years for the FR World Cup they are ready to really show what they can do.

— FIA Single-Seater Committee President Emanuele Pirro

=== Entrants ===
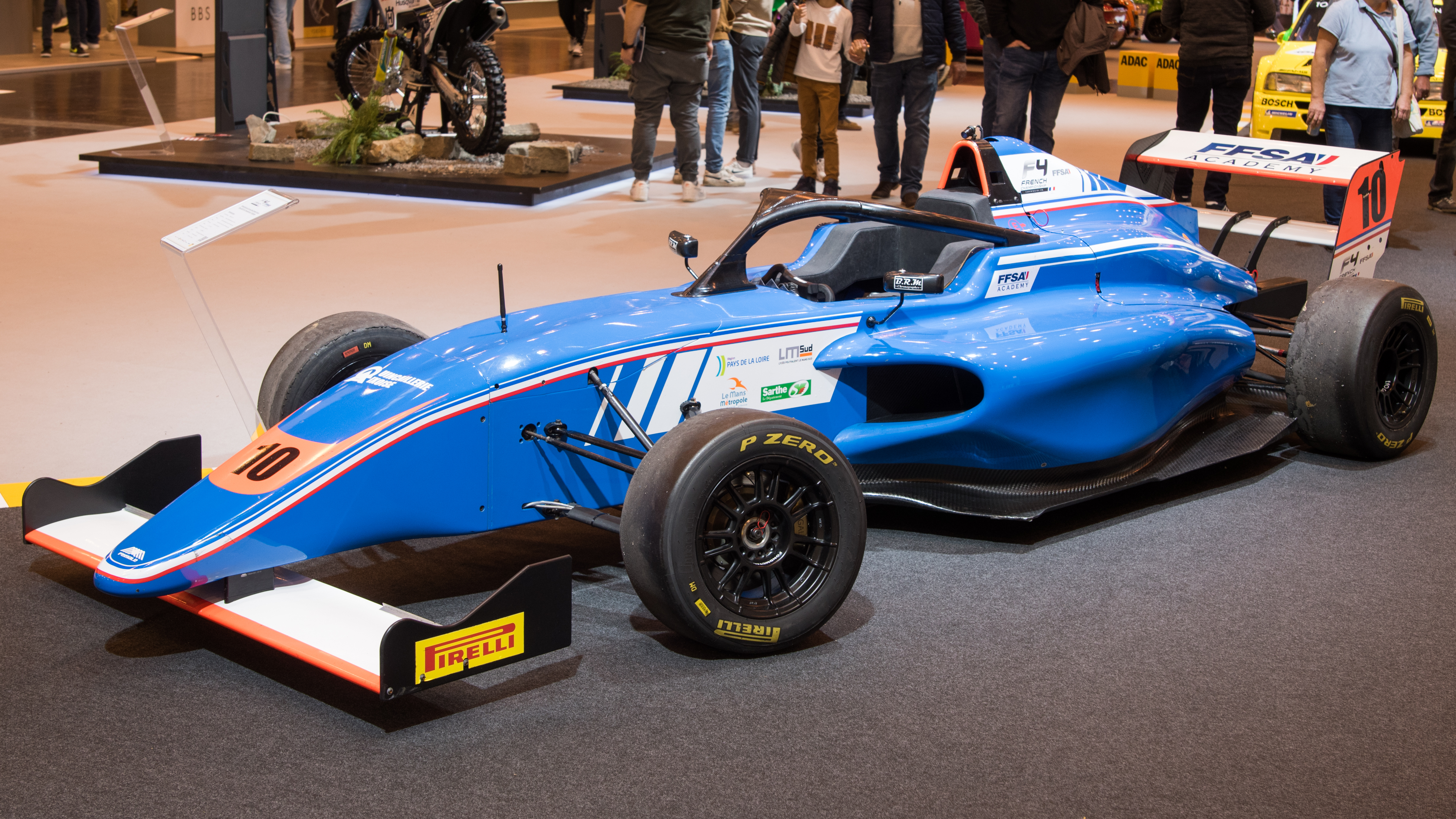
The inaugural FIA F4 World Cup used identical Ligier-branded Mygale M21-F4 chassis, powered by 1.3L I4 engines.

All competitors used an identical Ligier-branded Mygale M21-F4 chassis with an Alpine 1.3L turbocharged inline-four engine and Pirelli tyres; all cars were centrally-run under spec conditions. Entry to the competition was by invite-only with eligibility determined by the FIA, including the perceived top drivers from F4 series from across the world, as well as local talent from Macau and China. Technical support for the event was provided by F4 Chinese Championship organiser Mintimes and the French Federation of Automobile Sport (FFSA). Each driver had a budget of MOP$350,000 (US$43,000), with mechanics and race engineers provided by the FIA, alongside the chassis, engine, fuel, tyres, insurance, travel, and accommodation—similar to the format of the Champions of the Future Academy Program in kart racing. A prize of US$8,000 was awarded to the winner of the World Cup.

Invitees from nine FIA-certified F4 series were entered into the event upon the acceptance of their submissions, with one female driver on the entry list—Emily Cotty. Of the 20 drivers entered into the World Cup, six were reigning champions in F4—Fionn McLaughlin, Alexandre Munoz, Shimo Zhang, Gino Trappa, Kean Nakamura-Berta, and Emanuele Olivieri—and one was a Macanese former champion, Tiago Rodrigues; GB4 champion Ary Bansal was also invited. The champions of Brazil, India, Japan, NACAM, Saudi Arabia, South East Asia, Spain, and the United States were not in attendance. An invitee, Ethan Nobels, withdrew from the event following an accident in the Brazilian Championship a week prior, which resulted in a concussion and lung injuries.

Entry list
No.	Driver	FIA-certified series
2	(Macau) Marcus Cheong	Kart racing
3	(Macau) Tiago Rodrigues	F4 Middle East
3	(Macau) Tiago Rodrigues	F4 Chinese‡
5	(Republic of Ireland) Fionn McLaughlin	F4 British†
7	(France) Jules Roussel	French F4
11	(France) Alexandre Munoz	French F4†
12	(Brazil) Ethan Nobels (Note: Nobels withdrew from the race following an accident in the F4 Brazilian Championship earlier the same month.)	F4 Brazilian
15	(China) Wang Yuzhe	F4 Middle East
15	(China) Wang Yuzhe	F4 Chinese
16	(South Korea) Kyuho Lee	F4 Spanish
17	(Japan) Itsuki Sato	F4 Japanese
17	(Japan) Itsuki Sato	F4 Indian
21	(Hong Kong) Shimo Zhang	F4 Chinese†
26	(France) Rayan Caretti	French F4
30	(Japan) Rintaro Sato	French F4
42	(United Kingdom) Emily Cotty	F4 Middle East
42	(United Kingdom) Emily Cotty	Italian F4
42	(United Kingdom) Emily Cotty	E4
46	(India) Ary Bansal	GB4† (Note: The GB4 Championship used older-generation GB3 cars instead of F4 machinery and was not FIA-certified.)
46	(India) Ary Bansal	F4 British
46	(India) Ary Bansal	Italian F4
46	(India) Ary Bansal	E4
46	(India) Ary Bansal	F4 Saudi Arabian
48	(Argentina) Gino Trappa	F4 Spanish
48	(Argentina) Gino Trappa	Formula 4 CEZ†
51	(United Kingdom) Kean Nakamura-Berta (Note: Kean Nakamura-Berta is Japanese and Slovak but competed under a British licence.)	F4 Middle East
51	(United Kingdom) Kean Nakamura-Berta	Italian F4†
51	(United Kingdom) Kean Nakamura-Berta	E4†
61	(Hong Kong) Kimi Chan	F4 Chinese
68	(Italy) Emanuele Olivieri	F4 Middle East†
68	(Italy) Emanuele Olivieri	Italian F4
87	(United Kingdom) Thomas Bearman	F4 British
98	(United States) Sebastian Wheldon	F4 Middle East
98	(United States) Sebastian Wheldon	Italian F4
98	(United States) Sebastian Wheldon	E4

† Reigning champion in series.
‡ Former champion in series.

== Practice ==
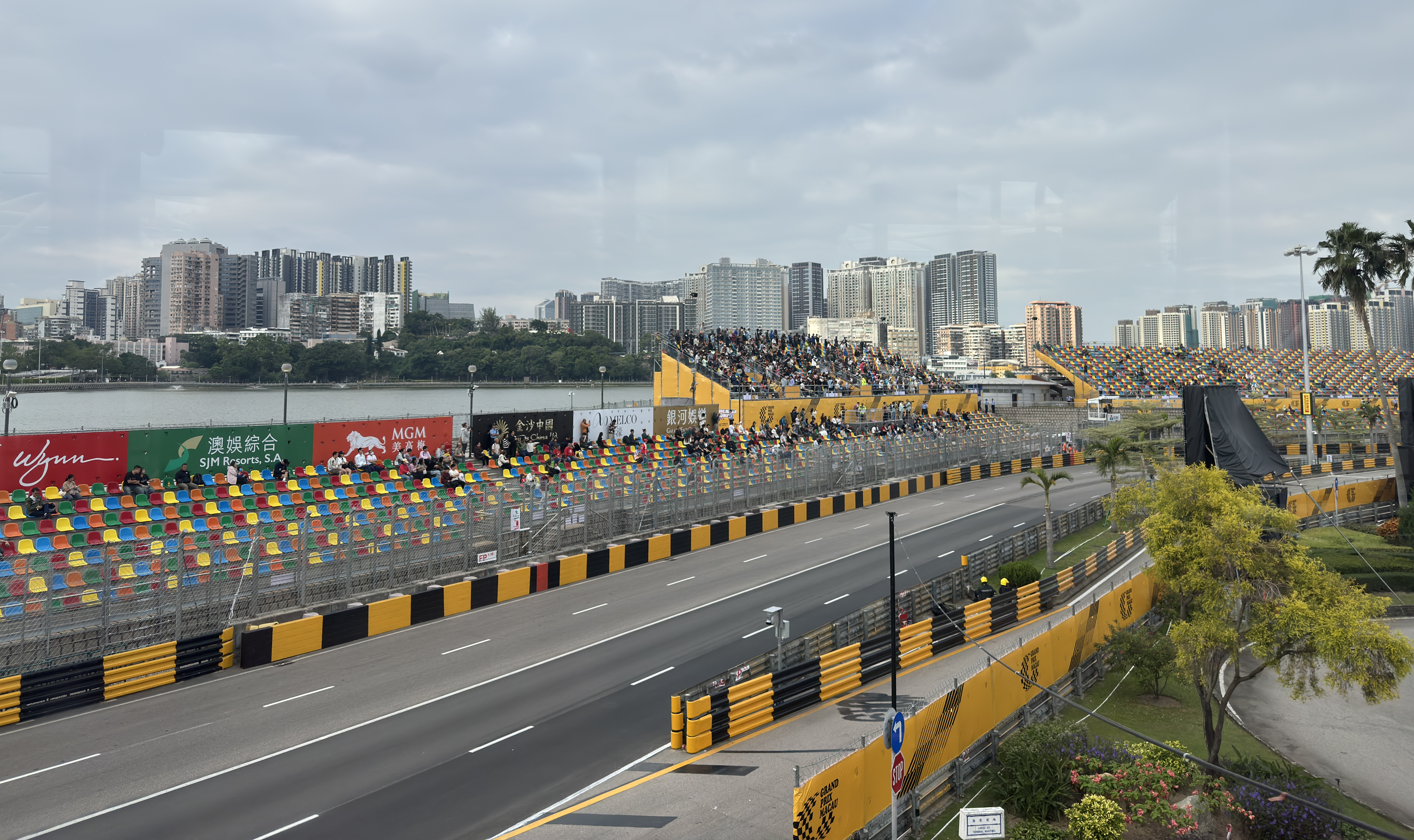
116,000 spectators were in attendance across the four-day weekend.

Two free practice sessions were held: free practice one (FP1) on 13 November 2025 at 10:10 local time (UTC+8) and free practice two (FP2) on 14 November 2025 at 09:15. The changing weather conditions of FP1 were dominated by Kean Nakamura-Berta, who went eight-tenths clear of Emanuele Olivieri and 1.1 seconds clear of Gino Trappa. FP2—again held in changing conditions—saw Sebastian Wheldon usurp both Nakamura-Berta and Olivieri by seven-tenths.

Both sessions were heavily impacted by red flags ensuing accidents; drivers to find the narrow walls of the Guia included Alexandre Munoz, Wang Yuzhe, Trappa, and Emily Cotty. Fionn McLaughlin failed to set a time in both sessions due to mechanical issues encountered on his opening lap in FP1. The Sports Bureau of the Macao SAR Government (ID) reported that there were 15,000 spectators in attendance for FP1 and 28,000 for FP2.

== Qualifying ==
A 40-minute qualifying session was held on 14 November 2025, at 13:30 local time (UTC+8), to determine the grid for the qualification race; conditions were dry with a surface air temperature of 27 °C (81 °F).

=== Qualifying report ===
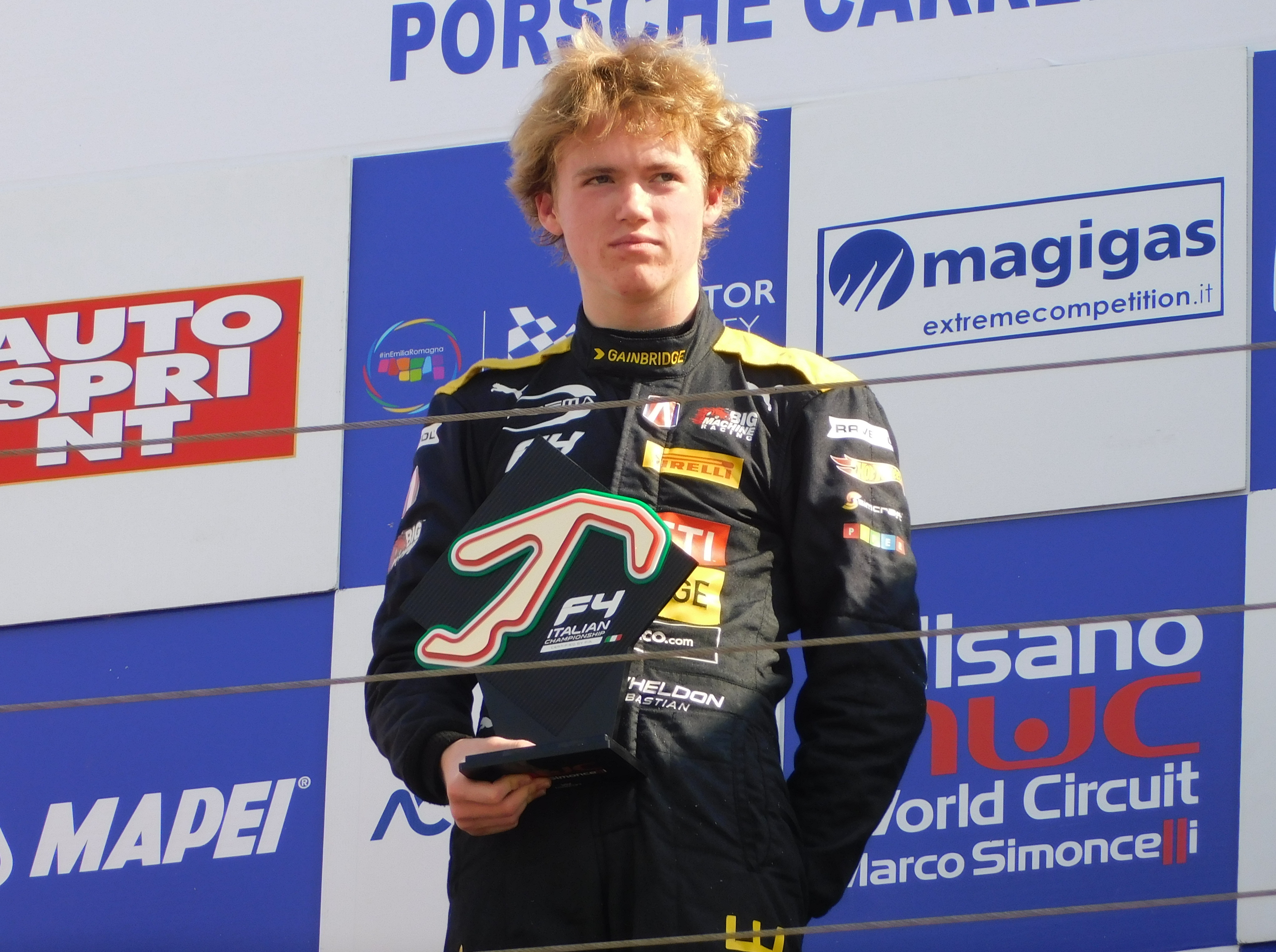
Sebastian Wheldon beat Kean Nakamura-Berta to pole position for the qualification race following four red flags.

Sebastian Wheldon claimed pole position for the qualification race with a fastest lap time of 2:24.148 (152.8 km/h; 94.9 mph). Fionn McLaughlin—whose mechanical issues forced him to take the unused chassis of Ethan Nobels—set the pace early on. His time was then displaced by Rintaro Sato and Jules Roussel, the latter usurping Sato on his second run. Alexandre Munoz went purple through the opening three of four sectors before crashing at Police and prompting the first red flag of the session with 26 minutes remaining. Rayan Caretti collided with the barriers at the Solitude Esses but was able to continue.

On his first lap after the stoppage, Caretti crashed at Hotel Lisboa and caused a second red flag; nobody improved in the six-minute interval. Drivers began switching to fresh tyres past the mid-way point and Kean Nakamura-Berta was the first to strike after the restart, with Thomas Bearman cutting his advantage to seven-thousandths. Wheldon responded with a lap three-tenths clear of the field, which Nakamura-Berta immediately reduced to 0.136 seconds. With 10 minutes remaining in the session, fifth-placed Tiago Rodrigues was sent into the barriers at Hotel Lisboa in an attempted overtake by Roussel for clean air. Gino Trappa further crashed at Police, causing a third red flag period.

Following the third restart, Nakamura-Berta escaped a barrier collision at Dona Maria on his first flying lap, but Rintaro Sato's crash at Fisherman's Bend three minutes from the chequered flag ended the session prematurely. Wheldon and Nakamura-Berta retained their top positions, with Olivieri, Bearman, and Rodrigues rounding out the top five. Per the regulations, all three drivers who individually caused red flags had their fastest lap time deleted: Munoz, Caretti, and Rintaro Sato. Roussel received a three-place grid penalty for his incident with Rodrigues and dropped to ninth—behind McLaughlin, Rintaro Sato, and Ary Bansal. No drivers fell short of the 107% rule set out in the regulations, requiring drivers to set a lap time within 107% of the fastest lap to proceed. There were 28,000 spectators in attendance for qualifying, per ID.

=== Qualifying classification ===
Qualifying classification
Pos.	No.	Driver	Time	Gap	Final grid
1	98	(United States) Sebastian Wheldon	2:24.148	—	1
2	51	(United Kingdom) Kean Nakamura-Berta	2:24.284	+0.136	2
3	68	(Italy) Emanuele Olivieri	2:24.364	+0.216	3
4	87	(United Kingdom) Thomas Bearman	2:24.545	+0.397	4
5	3	(Macau) Tiago Rodrigues	2:24.703	+0.555	5
6	7	(France) Jules Roussel	2:24.753	+0.605	9^{1}
7	5	(Republic of Ireland) Fionn McLaughlin	2:24.787	+0.639	6
8	30	(Japan) Rintaro Sato	2:25.089	+0.941	7
9	46	(India) Ary Bansal	2:25.360	+1.212	8
10	21	(Hong Kong) Shimo Zhang	2:25.646	+1.498	10
11	48	(Argentina) Gino Trappa	2:25.656	+1.508	11
12	16	(South Korea) Kyuho Lee	2:25.671	+1.523	12
13	61	(Hong Kong) Kimi Chan	2:26.129	+1.981	13
14	17	(Japan) Itsuki Sato	2:26.355	+2.207	14
15	26	(France) Rayan Caretti	2:26.495	+2.347	15
16	42	(United Kingdom) Emily Cotty	2:27.654	+3.506	16
17	2	(Macau) Marcus Cheong	2:27.692	+3.544	17
18	11	(France) Alexandre Munoz	2:28.209	+4.061	18
19	19	(China) Wang Yuzhe	2:29.379	+5.231	19
107% time: 2:34.238

Notes

- ^1 – Jules Roussel received a three-place grid penalty for causing a collision with Tiago Rodrigues.

== Qualification race ==
The qualification race was held on 15 November 2025, at 11:40 local time (UTC+8), and was run for eight laps to determine the grid for the main race; conditions were dry with a surface air temperature of 24 °C (75 °F).

=== Qualification race report ===
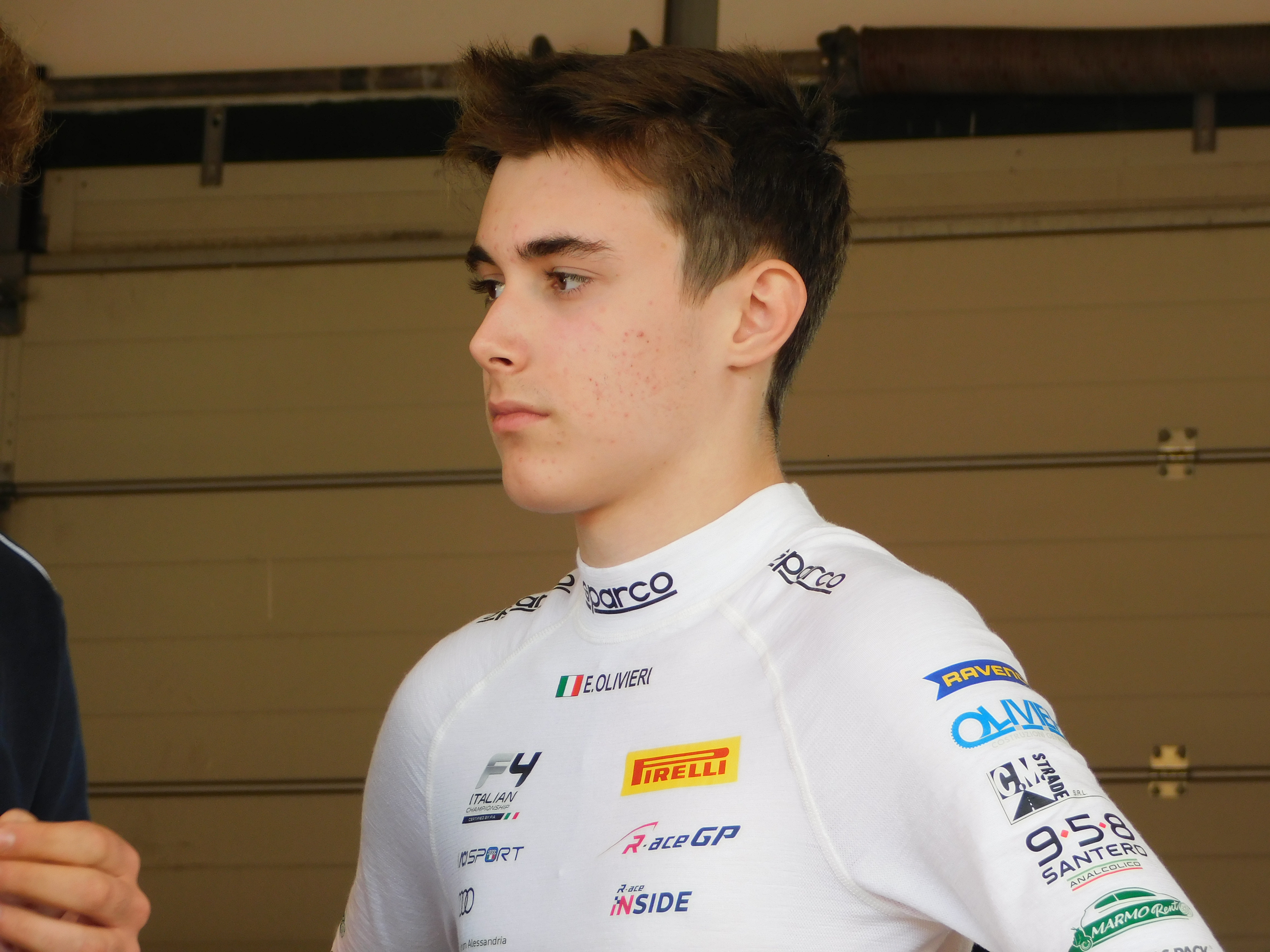
Emanuele Olivieri won the qualification race from third on the grid, ahead of Jules Roussel and Rayan Caretti.

Emanuele Olivieri won the eight-lap qualification race from third on the grid, setting a fastest lap of 2:25.372 (151.5 km/h; 94.1 mph) on the final tour. There were 35,000 spectators in attendance for the qualification race, per ID.

=== Qualification race classification ===
Qualification race classification
Pos.	No.	Driver	Laps	Time/Retired	Grid
1	68	(Italy) Emanuele Olivieri	8	23:10.216	3
2	7	(France) Jules Roussel	8	+5.687	9
3	26	(France) Rayan Caretti	8	+8.883	15
4	46	(India) Ary Bansal	8	+9.341	8
5	61	(Hong Kong) Kimi Chan	8	+9.481	13
6	16	(South Korea) Kyuho Lee	8	+9.513	12
7	21	(Hong Kong) Shimo Zhang	8	+20.636	10
8	17	(Japan) Itsuki Sato	8	+20.842	14
9	2	(Macau) Marcus Cheong	8	+22.999	17
10	15	(China) Wang Yuzhe	8	+25.700	19
11	30	(Japan) Rintaro Sato	8	+35.781^{1}	7
12	5	(Republic of Ireland) Fionn McLaughlin	7	+1 lap	6
Ret	42	(United Kingdom) Emily Cotty	4	Accident	16
Ret	11	(France) Alexandre Munoz	4	Accident	18
Ret	98	(United States) Sebastian Wheldon	0	Accident	1
Ret	51	(United Kingdom) Kean Nakamura-Berta	0	Accident	2
Ret	87	(United Kingdom) Thomas Bearman	0	Accident	4
Ret	3	(Macau) Tiago Rodrigues	0	Accident	5
Ret	48	(Argentina) Gino Trappa	0	Accident	11

Notes

- ^1 – Rintaro Sato finished third, but received a 10-second stop-go penalty converted into a 30-second time penalty for a delayed formation lap start.

== Main race ==
The main race was held on 16 November 2025, at 09:15 local time (UTC+8), and was run for 10 laps; conditions were dry with a surface air temperature of 24 °C (75 °F).

=== Main race report ===
Polesitter Emanuele Olivieri was overtaken by Frenchmen Jules Roussel and Rayan Caretti heading into Hotel Lisboa on the first lap. Roussel and Caretti proceeded to battle for eight laps until the latter collided with a wall and brought out a race-ending safety car.

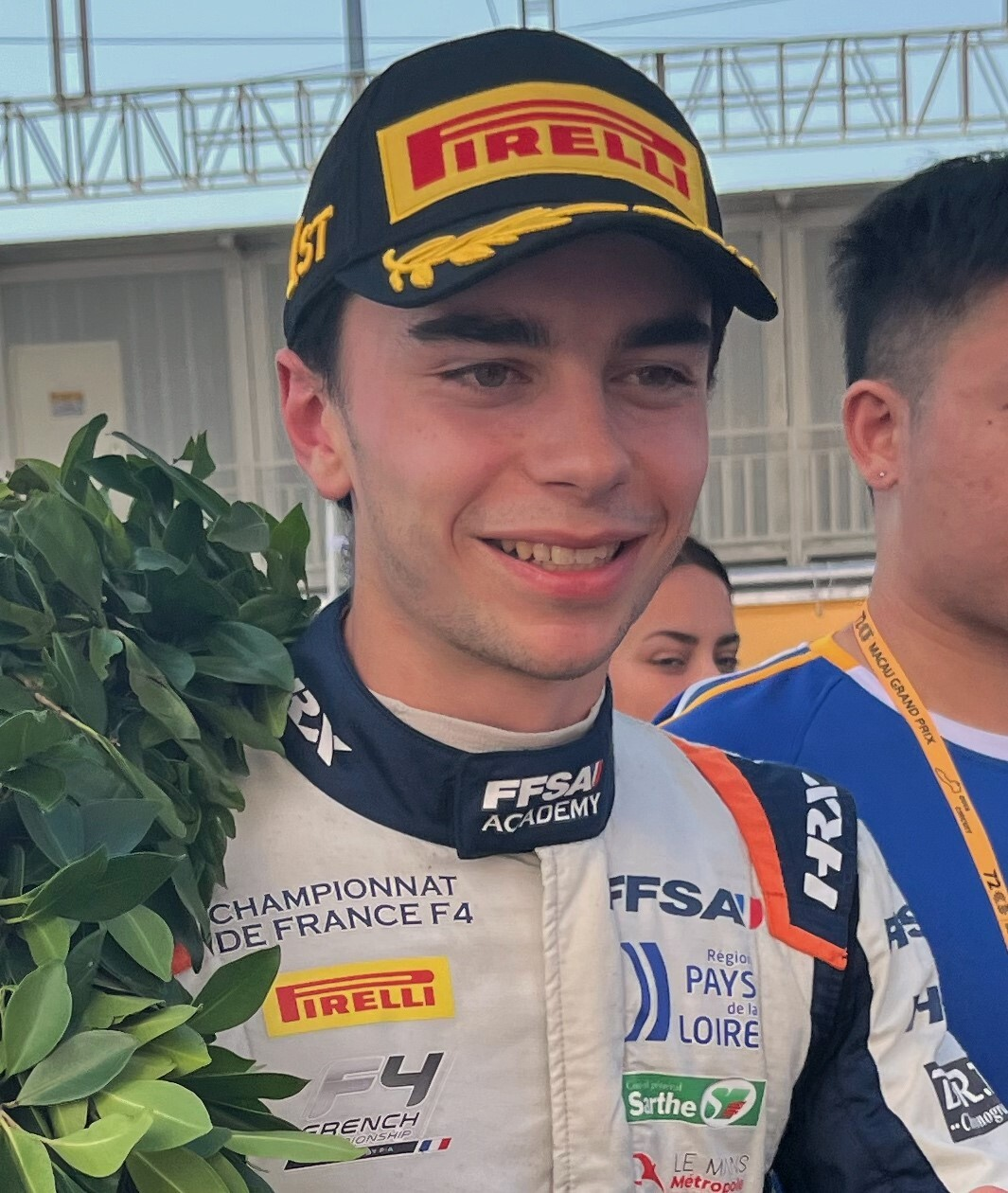
Roussel won the inaugural World Cup under the safety car following a late crash for Caretti.

Roussel won the 10-lap main race from second on the grid, ahead of Olivieri and Rintaro Sato. Sebastian Wheldon set a fastest lap of 2:24.425 (152.5 km/h; 94.8 mph) on lap six. There were 38,000 spectators were in attendance for the main race, per ID, for a total of 116,000 across the four-day weekend—a 15% increase on the 2024 Macau Grand Prix weekend, where the FIA F4 World Cup was not held.

=== Main race classification ===
Main race classification
Pos.	No.	Driver	Laps	Time/Retired	Grid
1	7	(France) Jules Roussel	10	31:16.409	2
2	68	(Italy) Emanuele Olivieri	10	+1.258	1
3	30	(Japan) Rintaro Sato	10	+1.438	11
4	98	(United States) Sebastian Wheldon	10	+3.171	15
5	46	(India) Ary Bansal	10	+3.912	4
6	87	(United Kingdom) Thomas Bearman	10	+4.682	17
7	61	(Hong Kong) Kimi Chan	10	+5.067	5
8	2	(Macau) Marcus Cheong	10	+5.282	9
9	48	(Argentina) Gino Trappa	10	+5.413	19
10	3	(Macau) Tiago Rodrigues	10	+5.782	18
11	15	(China) Wang Yuzhe	10	+6.541	10
12	42	(United Kingdom) Emily Cotty	10	+7.887	13
13	5	(Republic of Ireland) Fionn McLaughlin	10	+34.268^{1}	12
Ret	26	(France) Rayan Caretti	7	Accident	3
NC	51	(United Kingdom) Kean Nakamura-Berta	8	+2 laps	16
Ret	11	(France) Alexandre Munoz	2	Accident	14
Ret	16	(South Korea) Kyuho Lee	0	Accident	6
Ret	21	(Hong Kong) Shimo Zhang	0	Accident	7
Ret	17	(Japan) Itsuki Sato	0	Accident	8

Notes

- ^1 – Fionn McLaughlin finished sixth, but received a 10-second stop-go penalty converted into a 30-second time penalty for a delayed formation lap start.

== See also ==
- 2025 Macau Grand Prix
- 2025 FIA GT World Cup
- 2025 Macau Guia Race
