= Kolkata Royal Tigers =

Indian racing team

(India) Kolkata Royal Tigers
- Founded: 2024
- Founder(s): Sourav Ganguly
- Former names: Rarh Bengal Tigers
- Base: Kolkata, West Bengal
- Current series: Indian Racing League; F4 Indian Championship
- Current drivers: Indian Racing League (United Kingdom) Jemma Moore; Sandeep Kumar (United Kingdom) Tom Canning; Sohil Shah F4 India Ishaan Madesh (Mozambique) Ghazi Motlekar

Kolkata Royal Tigers is an Indian motorsport franchise that competes in the Indian Racing League and the F4 Indian Championship.

== History ==
In 2024, cricketer Sourav Ganguly bought the franchise and named it Kolkata Royal Tigers. Later Shrachi Group joined, and team was renamed to Rarh Bengal Tigers prior to 2024 season– referencing the historical region of Rarh. As well as running two cars for the existing drivers in IRL, the franchise expanded to four cars for Indian F4; keeping two under the old Kochi title. Yoong scored the teams' only race win in the 2024 IRL at the first round, however consistency kept Alva and Wohlwend in the championship fight up to the last race – Car #5 ultimately finished third in the entrants' standings after colliding with Akash Gowda, whilst the franchise finished runner-up to Goa in the teams' championship. Alva completed double-duty having also campaigned in F4, finishing runner-up in the standings to South African Aqil Alibhai – Hugh Barter had set the pace early in the season under the Kochi banner with three race wins, but withdrew after the second round.

Before the start of 2025 Shrachi Group exited the franchise and went back to original name of Kolkata Royal Tigers.

== Results ==
=== Indian Racing League ===
==== Drivers / Entrants championship ====
(key)

| Year | Entry | Drivers | 1 | 2 | 3 | 4 | 5 | 6 | 7 | 8 | 9 | 10 | 11 | 12 | Pos. | Pts |
|---|---|---|---|---|---|---|---|---|---|---|---|---|---|---|---|---|
| 2024 | | | IRU1; R1 | IRU1; R2 | IGR; R1 | IGR; R2 | IRU2; R1 | IRU2; R2 | COI1; R1 | COI1; R2 | COI2; R1 | COI2; R2 | | | | |
| 2024 | Rarh Bengal Tigers #5 | (India) Ruhaan Alva | 3 | | | 3 | 3 | | | 2 | | Ret | | | 3rd | 123 |
| 2024 | Rarh Bengal Tigers #5 | (Liechtenstein) Fabienne Wohlwend | | 4 | 4 | | | 5 | 4 | | 6 | | | | 3rd | 123 |
| 2024 | Rarh Bengal Tigers #2 | (Malaysia) Alister Yoong | | 1 | 3 | | 4 | | | DNS | | 7 | | | 4th | 97 |
| 2024 | Rarh Bengal Tigers #2 | (United States) Nikhil Bohra | 5 | | | DNS | | | 6 | | 8 | | | | 4th | 97 |
| 2024 | Rarh Bengal Tigers #2 | (India) Jaden Pariat | | | | | | 4 | | | | | | | 4th | 97 |

==== Teams championship ====
(key)

| Year | Entry | No. | 1 | 2 | 3 | 4 | 5 | 6 | 7 | 8 | 9 | 10 | 11 | 12 | Pos. | Pts |
|---|---|---|---|---|---|---|---|---|---|---|---|---|---|---|---|---|
| 2024 | | | IRU1; R1 | IRU1; R2 | IGR; R1 | IGR; R2 | IRU2; R1 | IRU2; R2 | COI1; R1 | COI1; R2 | COI2; R1 | COI2; R2 | | | | |
| 2024 | Rarh Bengal Tigers | #5 | 3 | 4 | 4 | 3 | 3 | 5 | 4 | 2 | 6 | Ret | | | 2nd | 220 |
| 2024 | Rarh Bengal Tigers | #2 | 5 | 1 | 3 | DNS | 4 | 4 | 6 | DNS | 8 | 7 | | | 2nd | 220 |

=== F4 Indian Championship ===
(key)

| Year | Entry | Drivers | 1 | 2 | 3 | 4 | 5 | 6 | 7 | 8 | 9 | 10 | 11 | 12 | 13 | 14 | 15 | Pos. | Pts |
|---|---|---|---|---|---|---|---|---|---|---|---|---|---|---|---|---|---|---|---|
| 2024 | | | IRU1; R1 | IRU1; R2 | IRU1; R3 | IGR; R1 | IGR; R2 | IRU2; R1 | IRU2; R2 | IRU2; R3 | IRU2; R4 | COI1; R1 | COI1; R2 | COI1; R3 | COI2; R1 | COI2; R2 | COI2; R3 | | |
| 2024 | Rarh Bengal Tigers (#27) | (India) Ruhaan Alva | 3 | 5 | 3 | 2 | 4 | 5 | 1 | 2 | 3 | 2 | 3 | 2 | 2 | 1 | 1 | 2nd | 264 |
| 2024 | Rarh Bengal Tigers (#10, #65, #23, #64) | (India) Raiden Samervel | | | | | | different team | | | | | | | 7 | 4 | 5 | 11th | 40 |
| 2024 | Rarh Bengal Tigers (#10, #65, #23, #64) | (India) Arjun Chheda | | | | | | | | | | 13 | 4 | Ret | | | | 19th | 12 |
| 2024 | Rarh Bengal Tigers (#10, #65, #23, #64) | (India) Tarun Muthiaiah | 9 | Ret | 8 | 9 | Ret | | | | | | | | | | | 21st | 8 |
| 2024 | Rarh Bengal Tigers (#10, #65, #23, #64) | (Netherlands) Esmee Kosterman | | | | | | 9 | 10 | 11 | 11 | | | | | | | 24th | 3 |
