= 2024 MRF Formula 2000 season =

Auto racing championship in India

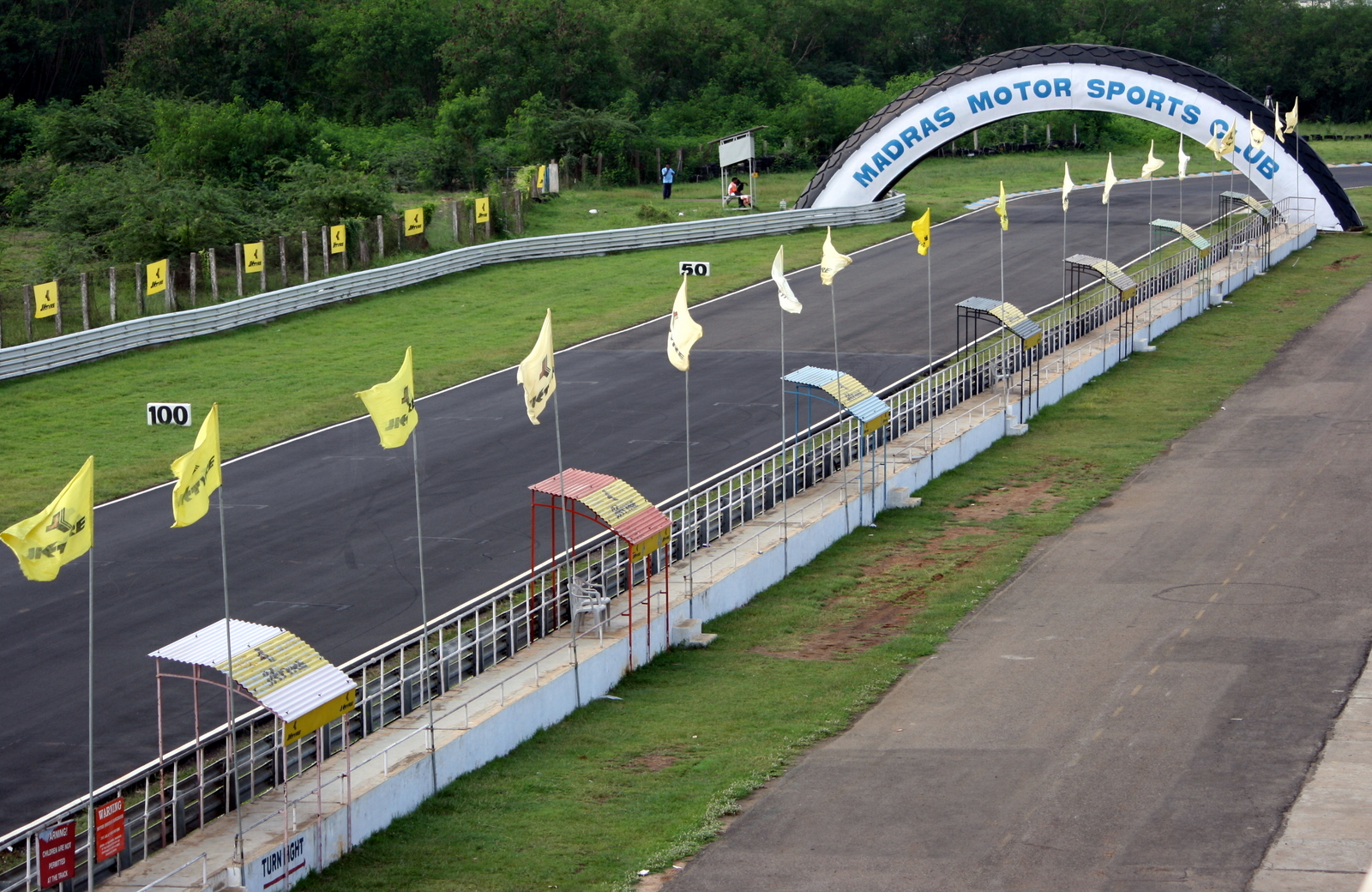
All races were held at Madras Motor Race Track for the second year in a row.

The 2024 MRF Formula 2000 season was the tenth of the Formula 2000-level single-seater championship in India previously known as the MRF Challenge. This was the third season of the championship restarted in 2022 without support of the FIA, and therefore simply called MRF Formula 2000, with the field consisting of domestic drivers rather than foreign racers competing over the European and Northern American off-season.

The season began on 17 February 2024 and was run over four weekends until August 2024. Jaden Pariat won the championship after winning eight of the twelve races.

== Drivers ==
The following drivers, all of them Indian-registered, contest the championship:

No.	Driver	Rounds
5	Jaden Pariat	All
6	Chetan Surineni	All
7	Shriya Lohia	3–4
22	Akhil Agarwal	3–4
80	Tarun Muthiaiah	All

== Race calendar and results ==
Like in the seasons before, the calendar consists only of races held at Madras Motor Race Track. While 2023 saw two championships held, one from late 2022 to early 2023 and one in the later months of 2023, 2024 was to see a five-round continuous championship. The final round, however, was not held.

Round		Circuit	Date	Pole position	Fastest lap	Winning driver	Support bill
1	R1	Madras Motor Race Track, Chennai	17 February	Jaden Pariat	Jaden Pariat	Chetan Surineni	Indian Touring Car National Championship; Indian Junior Touring Car National Championship; MRF Saloons; Formula LGB 1300
1	R2	Madras Motor Race Track, Chennai	18 February		Jaden Pariat	Jaden Pariat	Indian Touring Car National Championship; Indian Junior Touring Car National Championship; MRF Saloons; Formula LGB 1300
1	R3	Madras Motor Race Track, Chennai	18 February		Jaden Pariat	Jaden Pariat	Indian Touring Car National Championship; Indian Junior Touring Car National Championship; MRF Saloons; Formula LGB 1300
2	R1	Madras Motor Race Track, Chennai	24 February	Jaden Pariat	Jaden Pariat	Jaden Pariat	Indian Touring Car National Championship; Indian Junior Touring Car National Championship; Formula LGB 1300
2	R2	Madras Motor Race Track, Chennai	25 February		Jaden Pariat	Jaden Pariat	Indian Touring Car National Championship; Indian Junior Touring Car National Championship; Formula LGB 1300
2	R3	Madras Motor Race Track, Chennai	25 February		Jaden Pariat	Jaden Pariat	Indian Touring Car National Championship; Indian Junior Touring Car National Championship; Formula LGB 1300
3	R1	Madras Motor Race Track, Chennai	20 July	Jaden Pariat	Akhil Agarwal	Akhil Agarwal	Indian Touring Car National Championship; Indian Junior Touring Car National Championship; MRF Saloons; Formula LGB 1300
3	R2	Madras Motor Race Track, Chennai	21 July		Jaden Pariat	Jaden Pariat	Indian Touring Car National Championship; Indian Junior Touring Car National Championship; MRF Saloons; Formula LGB 1300
3	R3	Madras Motor Race Track, Chennai	21 July		Jaden Pariat	Jaden Pariat	Indian Touring Car National Championship; Indian Junior Touring Car National Championship; MRF Saloons; Formula LGB 1300
4	R1	Madras Motor Race Track, Chennai	17 August	Jaden Pariat	Jaden Pariat	Jaden Pariat	Indian Touring Car National Championship; Indian Junior Touring Car National Championship; MRF Saloons; VW Polo Cup
4	R2	Madras Motor Race Track, Chennai	18 August		Chetan Surineni	Chetan Surineni	Indian Touring Car National Championship; Indian Junior Touring Car National Championship; MRF Saloons; VW Polo Cup
4	R3	Madras Motor Race Track, Chennai	18 August		Chetan Surineni	Chetan Surineni	Indian Touring Car National Championship; Indian Junior Touring Car National Championship; MRF Saloons; VW Polo Cup

== Season report ==
Only three cars entered the first round of the season, a low point in series history. Jaden Pariat took pole position in qualifying and built a big lap until he suffered engine failures on the final lap. This handed Chetan Surineni the win, with Tarun Muthiaiah third. Pariat bounced back the next day to take two unchallenged wins and leave the first round leading the championship. Surineni took two distant second places, with Muthiaiah getting disqualified from race two and taking another third in race three.

With the same three drivers contesting round two, Pariat continued his campaign right where he left off: He took pole position for the first race and dominated it to take the win and the fastest lap. He quickly overtook his opponents to win the reversed-grid race two, before winning race three from the front to sweep the weekend. Surineni and Muthiaiah were no match for his pace throughout all three races, with the former taking three second places and the latter three third places as Pariat built up his points lead.

The grid attracted two new drivers for round three, but the competitive picture remained the same as Pariat took pole position and dominated the first race. He was disqualified post-race though, handing the win to debutant Akhil Agarwal ahead of Surineni and Muthiaiah. Pariat bounced back in race two and won, with Agarwal now third. Race three also went much the same, with Parait taking another win, Surineni second for the ninth time in a row and Agarwal third again. Pariat now had a lead of 24 points.

Pariat made it four pole positions out of four for the season finale and, after briefly losing his lead to Surineni, dominated the first race in usual fashion to lead Surineni and Muthiaiah home. Race two saw a different on-track outcome for the first time, as Surineni grabbed the lead at the start and Pariat was content to follow him home, with Agarwal in third. Surineni had to win the final race with Pariat not scoring to take the title, but Pariat once again followed him home to finish second and win the championship.

Despite offering the highest-powered single-seater of any domestic Indian racing series, interest and competition in MRF F2000 hit a new low in 2024. Only five drivers took part in the championship, and Pariat won eight out of the twelve races, only being off first place because of car issues, a disqualification and focusing on taking the title on the final day.

== Championship standings ==
Scoring system

Position	1st	2nd	3rd	4th	5th	6th	7th	8th	9th	10th
Points	25	18	15	12	10	8	6	4	2	1

Pos.	Driver	CHE1			CHE2			CHE3			CHE4			Points
1	Jaden Pariat	**2**	1	1	**1**	1	1	**DSQ**	1	1	**1**	2	2	254
2	Chetan Surineni	1	2	2	2	2	2	2	2	2	2	1	1	237
3	Tarun Muthiaiah	3	DSQ	3	3	3	3	3	4	4	3	5	3	154
4	Akhil Agarwal							1	3	3	5	3	5	90
5	Shriya Lohia							4	5	5	4	4	4	68
Pos.	Driver	CHE1			CHE2			CHE3			CHE4			Points

Colour	Result
Gold	Winner
Silver	Second place
Bronze	Third place
Green	Points classification
Blue	Non-points classification
Blue	Non-classified finish (NC)
Purple	Retired, not classified (Ret)
Red	Did not qualify (DNQ)
Red	Did not pre-qualify (DNPQ)
Black	Disqualified (DSQ)
White	Did not start (DNS)
White	Withdrew (WD)
White	Race cancelled (C)
Blank	Did not practice (DNP)
Blank	Did not arrive (DNA)
Blank	Excluded (EX)

**Bold** – Pole

Italics – Fastest Lap
