= 2026 Porsche Carrera Cup Japan =

One-make motor racing season in Japan

The 2026 Porsche Carrera Cup Japan was the twenty-fifth season of the Porsche Carrera Cup Japan. The season started on 27 March at the Suzuka Circuit, and concluded at Fuji Speedway on 26 September. The series was operated by Porsche Motorsport Asia Pacific.

== Calendar ==
Round		Circuit	Date	Supporting	Map of circuit locations
1	R1	(Mie Prefecture) Suzuka Circuit, Suzuka	29 March	Formula One World Championship; Ferrari Challenge Japan	2026 Porsche Carrera Cup Japan is located in Japan
2	R2	(Okayama Prefecture) Okayama International Circuit, Mimasaka	16–17 May	Okayama Challenge Cup; F110 Cup	2026 Porsche Carrera Cup Japan is located in Japan
2	R3	(Okayama Prefecture) Okayama International Circuit, Mimasaka	16–17 May	Okayama Challenge Cup; F110 Cup	2026 Porsche Carrera Cup Japan is located in Japan
3	R4	(Shizuoka Prefecture) Fuji Speedway, Oyama	18–19 July	Super Formula Championship; Kyojo Cup	2026 Porsche Carrera Cup Japan is located in Japan
3	R5	(Shizuoka Prefecture) Fuji Speedway, Oyama	18–19 July	Super Formula Championship; Kyojo Cup	2026 Porsche Carrera Cup Japan is located in Japan
4	R6	(Miyagi Prefecture) Sportsland Sugo, Murata	8–9 August	Super Formula Championship; Honda N-One Owner's Cup	2026 Porsche Carrera Cup Japan is located in Japan
4	R7	(Miyagi Prefecture) Sportsland Sugo, Murata	8–9 August	Super Formula Championship; Honda N-One Owner's Cup	2026 Porsche Carrera Cup Japan is located in Japan
5	R8	(Mie Prefecture) Suzuka Circuit, Suzuka	12–13 September	Intercontinental GT Challenge; SRO Japan Cup	2026 Porsche Carrera Cup Japan is located in Japan
5	R9	(Mie Prefecture) Suzuka Circuit, Suzuka	12–13 September	Intercontinental GT Challenge; SRO Japan Cup	2026 Porsche Carrera Cup Japan is located in Japan
6	R10	(Shizuoka Prefecture) Fuji Speedway, Oyama	25–26 September	FIA World Endurance Championship; Formula Regional Japanese Championship	2026 Porsche Carrera Cup Japan is located in Japan
6	R11	(Shizuoka Prefecture) Fuji Speedway, Oyama	25–26 September	FIA World Endurance Championship; Formula Regional Japanese Championship	2026 Porsche Carrera Cup Japan is located in Japan

== Entry list ==
Team	No.	Driver	Class	Rounds
(Japan) Morethan Racing (Note: Car No. 7 entered as Morethan Racing. But for round 1, the No. 91 car entered as Bergwerk with Morethan Racing.) (Hong Kong) Bergwerk with Morethan Racing	7	(Australia) Parin Patel	Am	5
(Japan) Morethan Racing (Hong Kong) Bergwerk with Morethan Racing	91	(Hong Kong) Henry Kwong	Am	1
(Japan) / Bingo Racing (Note: Car No. 9 & No. 88 entered as Bingo Racing, and No. 60 entered as Showa Auto with Bingo Racing); (Japan) / Showa Auto with Bingo Racing	9	(France) Jules Kazuki Tréluyer	P	1
(Japan) / Bingo Racing; (Japan) / Showa Auto with Bingo Racing	60	(Japan) Reimei Ito	P	All
(Japan) / Bingo Racing; (Japan) / Showa Auto with Bingo Racing	88	(Chinese Taipei) Tiger Wu	PA	All
(Hong Kong) Bergwerk with Seven x Seven Racing (Note: Car No. 12, No. 66 & No. 99 entered as Seven x Seven Racing. But for round 1, the No. 12 car entered as Bergwerk with Seven x Seven Racing, the No. 95 car entered as My Construct by with Seven x Seven Racing.) (Japan) Seven x Seven Racing (Australia) My Construct by Seven x Seven Racing	12	(Vietnam) Sawer Hoàng Đạt	P	1
(Hong Kong) Bergwerk with Seven x Seven Racing (Japan) Seven x Seven Racing (Australia) My Construct by Seven x Seven Racing	12	(Australia) Lachlan Bloxsom	P	4
(Hong Kong) Bergwerk with Seven x Seven Racing (Japan) Seven x Seven Racing (Australia) My Construct by Seven x Seven Racing	66	(Australia) Lachlan Bloxsom	P	6
(Hong Kong) Bergwerk with Seven x Seven Racing (Japan) Seven x Seven Racing (Australia) My Construct by Seven x Seven Racing	66	(Netherlands) Robert de Haan	P	1–2, 4–5
(Hong Kong) Bergwerk with Seven x Seven Racing (Japan) Seven x Seven Racing (Australia) My Construct by Seven x Seven Racing	95	(Australia) Brett Boulton	PA	6
(Hong Kong) Bergwerk with Seven x Seven Racing (Japan) Seven x Seven Racing (Australia) My Construct by Seven x Seven Racing	99	(Japan) Taichi Watarai	P	All
(Japan) NGR	16	(Japan) "Hiro"	PA	All
(Japan) NGR	38	(Spain) Roberto Merhi	P	1
(Japan) NGR	83	(Japan) Makoto Haga	Am	6
(Japan) Hyper Water Racing	17	(Japan) "Ikeda"	Am	All
(Japan) Hyper Water Racing	27	(Japan) Souichirou Mano	Am	3–6
(Hong Kong) Bergwerk with CREF Motor Sport (Note: Car No. 23 entered as Bergwerk with CREF Motor Sport, and No. 84 entered as CREF Girodisc Miraitaga) (Japan) CREF Girodisc Miraitaga	23	(Hong Kong) Eric Kwong	Am	1
(Hong Kong) Bergwerk with CREF Motor Sport (Japan) CREF Girodisc Miraitaga	84	(Japan) Masa Taga	PA	1, 3, 6
(Japan) Starrise Racing	29	(Japan) Kohta Kawaai	P	1
(Japan) Starrise Racing	29	(Japan) "Kiyomin"	Am	2–6
(China) Sky Motorsports	36	(Luxembourg) Dylan Pereira	P	1
(Japan) Kyousei Racing	57	(Japan) Tsubasa Kondo	P	1
(Japan) Kyousei Racing	57	(Japan) "Fujiwara"	Am	2–5
(Japan) Sky Group	78	(Japan) Iori Kimura	P	All
(Japan) Bionic Jack Racing	83	(Japan) Makoto Haga	Am	5
(Japan) Bionic Jack Racing	98	(Japan) Itsuki Sato	P	6
Privateer	77	(Japan) Masaru Hamasaki	PA	1–3, 5–6

Icon	Class
P	Pro Cup
PA	Pro-Am Cup
Am	Am Cup
	Guest drivers ineligible to score points

== Results ==
Round		Circuit	Date	Pole position	Overall winner	Pro-Am Winner	Am Winner
1	R1	(Mie Prefecture) Suzuka	29 March	(Netherlands) Robert de Haan	(Netherlands) Robert de Haan	(Chinese Taipei) Tiger Wu	(Hong Kong) Henry Kwong
2	R2	(Okayama Prefecture) Okayama	16 May	(Netherlands) Robert de Haan	(Netherlands) Robert de Haan	(Chinese Taipei) Tiger Wu	(Japan) "Ikeda"
2	R3	(Okayama Prefecture) Okayama	17 May	(Netherlands) Robert de Haan	(Netherlands) Robert de Haan	(Chinese Taipei) Tiger Wu	(Japan) "Ikeda"
3	R4	(Shizuoka Prefecture) Fuji	18 July	(Japan) Reimei Ito	(Japan) Taichi Watarai	(Japan) Masa Taga	(Japan) "Ikeda"
3	R5	(Shizuoka Prefecture) Fuji	19 July	(Japan) Reimei Ito	(Japan) Taichi Watarai	(Japan) "Hiro"	(Japan) "Ikeda"
4	R6	(Miyagi Prefecture) Sugo	8 August	(Netherlands) Robert de Haan	(Netherlands) Robert de Haan	(Chinese Taipei) Tiger Wu	(Japan) "Ikeda"
4	R7	(Miyagi Prefecture) Sugo	9 August	(Netherlands) Robert de Haan	(Netherlands) Robert de Haan	(Chinese Taipei) Tiger Wu	(Japan) "Ikeda"
5	R8	(Mie Prefecture) Suzuka	12 September	(Netherlands) Robert de Haan	(Netherlands) Robert de Haan	(Japan) "Hiro"	(Japan) "Ikeda"
5	R9	(Mie Prefecture) Suzuka	13 September	(Netherlands) Robert de Haan	(Netherlands) Robert de Haan	(Japan) "Hiro"	(Japan) "Ikeda"
6	R10	(Shizuoka Prefecture) Fuji	25 September	(Japan) Reimei Ito	(Japan) Reimei Ito	(Japan) "Hiro"	(Japan) "Ikeda"
6	R11	(Shizuoka Prefecture) Fuji	26 September	(Japan) Iori Kimura	(Japan) Iori Kimura	(Japan) "Hiro"	(Japan) "Ikeda"

== Championship standings ==
=== Scoring system ===
Points were awarded to the top fifteen classified drivers in every race, using the following system:

Position	1st	2nd	3rd	4th	5th	6th	7th	8th	9th	10th	11th	12th	13th	14th	15th
Points	25	20	17	14	12	10	9	8	7	6	5	4	3	2	1

=== Overall ===
Pos	Driver	Team	SUZ1 (Mie Prefecture)	OKA (Okayama Prefecture)		FUJ1 (Shizuoka Prefecture)		SUG (Miyagi Prefecture)		SUZ2 (Mie Prefecture)		FUJ2 (Shizuoka Prefecture)		Pts
Pos	Driver	Team	R1 (Note: Less than 75% of the scheduled race distance was completed due to disruptions caused by an incident. Therefore, half points were awarded.)	R2	R3	R4	R5	R6	R7	R8	R9	R10	R11	Pts
1	(Japan) Taichi Watarai	(Japan) Seven x Seven Racing	2	2	3	1	1	3	2	9	3	3	4	189
2	(Japan) Iori Kimura	(Japan) Sky Racing	8	Ret	9	3	3	2	3	2	2	2	1	167
3	(Japan) Reimei Ito	(Japan) Bingo Racing	6	3	2	2	2	5	4	Ret	5	1	2	165
4	(Netherlands) Robert de Haan	(Japan) Seven x Seven Racing	1	1	1			1	1	1	1			162.5
5	(Japan) "Hiro"	(Japan) NGR	11	5	6	Ret	4	9	7	3	4	6	6	105.5
6	(Chinese Taipei) Tiger Wu	(Japan) Bingo Racing	10	4	4	Ret	5	6	6	6	7	7	8	99
7	(Japan) "Ikeda"	(Japan) Hyper Water Racing	16	7	5	6	8	7	8	4	8	10	10	90
8	(Japan) Masaru Hamasaki	Privateer	14	6	DNS	5	6			5	6	11	11	63
9	(Australia) Lachlan Bloxsom	(Japan) Seven x Seven Racing						4	5			4	3	57
10	(Japan) Souichirou Mano	(Japan) Hyper Water Racing				7	9	8	9	7	9	12	13	54
11	(Japan) "Kiyomin"	(Japan) HAI		8	7	8	10	10	10	Ret	11	14	14	52
12	(Japan) Masa Taga	(Japan) CREF Motor Sport	12			4	7					9	9	39
13	(Japan) Itsuki Sato	(Japan) Bionic Jack Racing										5	5	24
14	(Japan) Makoto Haga	(Japan) Bionic Jack Racing								8	10			21
14	(Japan) Makoto Haga	(Japan) NGR										13	12	21
15	(Australia) Brett Boulton	(Japan) Seven x Seven Racing										8	7	17
16	(Japan) "Fujiwara"	(Japan) Team KRM		9	8	DNS	DNS	WD	WD	WD	WD			15
17	(Luxembourg) Dylan Pereira	(China) Sky Motorsports	3											8.5
18	(Japan) Tsubasa Kondo	(Japan) Team KRM	4											7
19	(Vietnam) Sawer Hoàng Đạt	(Japan) Seven x Seven Racing	5											6
20	(Spain) Roberto Merhi	(Japan) NGR	7											4.5
21	(Japan) Kohta Kawaai	(Japan) HAI	9											3.5
22	(Hong Kong) Henry Kwong	(Japan) Morethan Racing	13											1.5
23	(Hong Kong) Eric Kwong	(Japan) CREF Motor Sport	15											0.5
24	(France) Jules Kazuki Tréluyer	(Japan) Bingo Racing	17											0
—	(Australia) Parin Patel	(Japan) Morethan Racing								WD	WD			0
Pos	Driver	Team	R1	R2	R3	R4	R5	R6	R7	R8	R9	R10	R11	Pts
Pos	Driver	Team	SUZ1 (Mie Prefecture)	OKA (Okayama Prefecture)		FUJ1 (Shizuoka Prefecture)		SUG (Miyagi Prefecture)		SUZ2 (Mie Prefecture)		FUJ2 (Shizuoka Prefecture)		Pts

=== Pro-Am ===
Pos	Driver	Team	SUZ1 (Mie Prefecture)	OKA (Okayama Prefecture)		FUJ1 (Shizuoka Prefecture)		SUG (Miyagi Prefecture)		SUZ2 (Mie Prefecture)		FUJ2 (Shizuoka Prefecture)		Pts
Pos	Driver	Team	R1	R2	R3	R4	R5	R6	R7	R8	R9	R10	R11	Pts
1	(Japan) "Hiro"	(Japan) NGR	2	2	2	Ret	1	2	2	1	1	1	1	215
2	(Chinese Taipei) Tiger Wu	(Japan) Bingo Racing	1	1	1	Ret	2	1	1	3	3	2	3	203.5
3	(Japan) Masaru Hamasaki	Privateer	4	3	DNS	2	3			2	2	5	4	127
4	(Japan) Masa Taga	(Japan) CREF Motor Sport	3			1	4					4	5	73.5
5	(Australia) Brett Boulton	(Japan) Seven x Seven Racing										3	2	37
Pos	Driver	Team	R1	R2	R3	R4	R5	R6	R7	R8	R9	R10	R11	Pts
Pos	Driver	Team	SUZ1 (Mie Prefecture)	OKA (Okayama Prefecture)		FUJ1 (Shizuoka Prefecture)		SUG (Miyagi Prefecture)		SUZ2 (Mie Prefecture)		FUJ2 (Shizuoka Prefecture)		Pts

=== Am ===
Pos	Driver	Team	SUZ1 (Mie Prefecture)	OKA (Okayama Prefecture)		FUJ1 (Shizuoka Prefecture)		SUG (Miyagi Prefecture)		SUZ2 (Mie Prefecture)		FUJ2 (Shizuoka Prefecture)		Pts
Pos	Driver	Team	R1	R2	R3	R4	R5	R6	R7	R8	R9	R10	R11	Pts
1	(Japan) "Ikeda"	(Japan) Hyper Water Racing	3	1	1	1	1	1	1	1	1	1	1	258.5
2	(Japan) Souichirou Mano	(Japan) Hyper Water Racing				2	2	2	2	2	2	2	3	157
3	(Japan) "Kiyomin"	(Japan) HIS		2	2	3	3	3	3	Ret	4	4	4	150
4	(Japan) Makoto Haga	(Japan) Bionic Jack Racing								3	3			71
4	(Japan) Makoto Haga	(Japan) NGR										3	2	71
5	(Japan) "Fujiwara"	(Japan) Team KRM		3	3	DNS	DNS	WD	WD	WD	WD			34
6	(Hong Kong) Henry Kwong	(Japan) Morethan Racing	1											12.5
7	(Hong Kong) Eric Kwong	(Japan) CREF Motor Sport	2											10
—	(Australia) Parin Patel	(Japan) Morethan Racing								WD	WD			0
Pos	Driver	Team	R1	R2	R3	R4	R5	R6	R7	R8	R9	R10	R11	Pts
Pos	Driver	Team	SUZ1 (Mie Prefecture)	OKA (Okayama Prefecture)		FUJ1 (Shizuoka Prefecture)		SUG (Miyagi Prefecture)		SUZ2 (Mie Prefecture)		FUJ2 (Shizuoka Prefecture)		Pts

=== Team ranking ===
Pos	Team	SUZ1 (Mie Prefecture)	OKA (Okayama Prefecture)		FUJ1 (Shizuoka Prefecture)		SUG (Miyagi Prefecture)		SUZ2 (Mie Prefecture)		FUJ2 (Shizuoka Prefecture)		Pts
Pos	Team	R1	R2	R3	R4	R5	R6	R7	R8	R9	R10	R11	Pts
1	(Japan) Seven x Seven Racing	1	1	1	1	1	1	1	1	1	3	3	410.5
1	(Japan) Seven x Seven Racing	2	2	3			3	2	9	3	4	4	410.5
1	(Japan) Seven x Seven Racing	5					4	5					410.5
2	(Japan) Bingo Racing	6	3	2	2	2	5	4	6	5	1	2	264
2	(Japan) Bingo Racing	10	4	4	Ret	5	6	6	Ret	7	7	8	264
2	(Japan) Bingo Racing	17											264
Pos	Team	R1	R2	R3	R4	R5	R6	R7	R8	R9	R10	R11	Pts
Pos	Team	SUZ1 (Mie Prefecture)	OKA (Okayama Prefecture)		FUJ1 (Shizuoka Prefecture)		SUG (Miyagi Prefecture)		SUZ2 (Mie Prefecture)		FUJ2 (Shizuoka Prefecture)		Pts

=== Dealer Trophy ===
Pos	Team	SUZ1 (Mie Prefecture)	OKA (Okayama Prefecture)		FUJ1 (Shizuoka Prefecture)		SUG (Miyagi Prefecture)		SUZ2 (Mie Prefecture)		FUJ2 (Shizuoka Prefecture)		Pts
Pos	Team	R1	R2	R3	R4	R5	R6	R7	R8	R9	R10	R11	Pts
1	(Japan) Showa Auto with Bingo Racing	1	1	1	1	1	2	2	Ret	2	1	2	217.5
2	(Japan) Sky Group	2	Ret	2	2	2	1	1	1	1	2	1	215
Pos	Team	R1	R2	R3	R4	R5	R6	R7	R8	R9	R10	R11	Pts
Pos	Team	SUZ1 (Mie Prefecture)	OKA (Okayama Prefecture)		FUJ1 (Shizuoka Prefecture)		SUG (Miyagi Prefecture)		SUZ2 (Mie Prefecture)		FUJ2 (Shizuoka Prefecture)		Pts

== See also ==
- 2026 Porsche Supercup
- 2026 Porsche Carrera Cup France
- 2026 Porsche Carrera Cup Germany
- 2026 Porsche Carrera Cup North America
- 2026 Porsche Carrera Cup Asia
- 2026 Porsche Carrera Cup Australia
