= MRF Challenge =

Single-Seater Racing Championship

MRF Formula 2000 and F1600
- Category: Single seaters
- Country: Based in India, Races in other Asian countries as well
- Inaugural season: 2013
- Constructors: Dallara (2000)
- Engine suppliers: 2.0 litre Renault (2000); 1.6 litre Ford (1600)
- Tyre suppliers: MRF
- Drivers' champion: (India) Jaden Pariat
- Official website: Official website

MRF Challenge is an open-wheel motorsport formula based in India organized by Madras Motor Sports Club. This was India's first and only FIA approved and inscribed international series. The cars were developed and manufactured by Coimbatore based J A Motorsport. This was promoted as a Winter series where young and upcoming racing drivers could get valuable seat and track time during the off-season months in competitive tracks in Asia. This was supported by MRF Ltd in its entirety and was a unique concept of "Arrive and Drive" which meant that the drivers would not have the hassle of making all arrangements. They would pay for a seat in the Championship and everything would be taken care of by the organizers.

== Point system ==
Position	1st	2nd	3rd	4th	5th	6th	7th	8th	9th	10th	Pole	FL
Points	25	18	15	12	10	8	6	4	2	1	2	2

== Champions ==
=== MRF Challenge ===
Season	Champion	Second	Third
2012–13	(United States) Conor Daly	(United Kingdom) Jordan King	(United Kingdom) Luciano Bacheta
2013–14	(United Kingdom) Rupert Svendsen-Cook	(Cyprus) Tio Ellinas	(France) Arthur Pic
2014–15	(United Kingdom) Toby Sowery	(United Kingdom) Ryan Cullen	(India) Raj Bharath
2015–16	(Brazil) Pietro Fittipaldi	(Colombia) Tatiana Calderón	(Russia) Nikita Troitskiy
2016–17	(United Kingdom) Harrison Newey	(Australia) Joey Mawson	(Germany) Mick Schumacher
2017–18	(Brazil) Felipe Drugovich	(Indonesia) Presley Martono	(Netherlands) Rinus van Kalmthout
2018–19	(United Kingdom) Jamie Chadwick	(Belgium) Max Defourny	(Finland) Patrik Pasma
2019–20	(Belgium) Michelangelo Amendola	(Australia) Dylan Young	(United Kingdom) Josh Mason

=== MRF Formula 2000 ===
Season	Champion	Second	Third
2022–23	(India) Sai Sanjay	(India) Mohamed Ryan	(India) Sohil Shah
2023	(India) Sandeep Kumar	(India) Arya Singh	(India) Aditya Swaminathan
2024	(India) Jaden Pariat	(India) Chetan Surineni	(India) Tarun Muthiaiah
2025–26	(India) Ishaan Madesh	(India) Arjun Chheda	(India) Tarun Muthiaiah
