= Madras Motor Sports Club =

Madras Motor Sports Club is an Indian auto racing club founded in 1952 and based in Chennai, India. Madras Motor Sports Club with its history of over 50 years is the reason that Chennai can be called the epicentre of motor racing in India.

Madras Motor Sports Club, located at the village of Irungattukottai near Sriperumbudur, Chennai organises world class racing events every year, including the South India Rally and the All India Motor Race Meet. Fédération Internationale de Motocyclisme (FIM) and the Fédération Internationale du Sport Automobile (FISA) have licensed the club for races up to Formula Three for cars and all classes for motorcycles. The club also has a dirt track for autocross events.

MMSC hosts at least 14 racing events for both cars and bikes, and an equal number of TSD rallies in the city. Some people associated with MMSC are today racing worldwide

== History ==
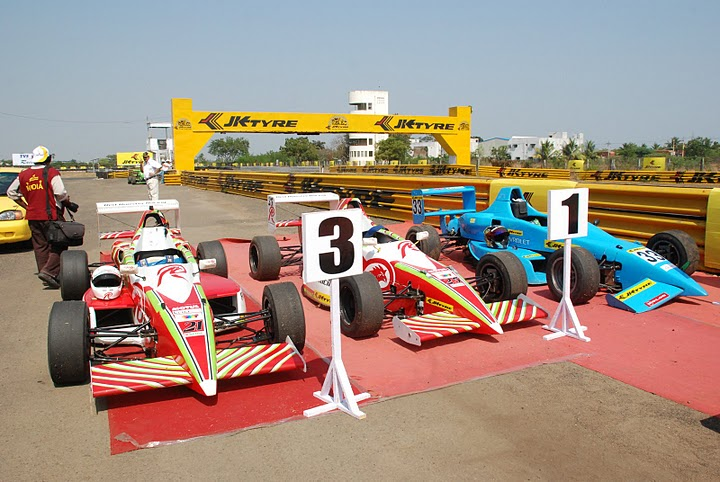
Formula Rolons at MMSC race track

In the year 1952, while a 1948 M G T F was being cleared from the Madras Harbour, discussions between the owner and R. De Souza on motor racing, rallying, etc. gave birth to the idea of a Motor Sports Club Englishman Rex Strong was a member of Calcutta Motor Sports Club when he met Indian K. Varugis who was searching for auto racing enthusiasts to form an auto racing club. In 1954, MMSC was founded but the first president was G. M. Donner. K. Varugis became the Hon. Secretary and Rex Strong was just one of the Committee member. Regional auto racing had been held at Sholavaram Airstrip since 25 October 1953. Since 1954, racers and organizers had been having dinner in MMSC after race meeting in Sholavaram. MMSC used to host Moped, Scooter, Superbike and Indian Saloon car racing, in addition to other top-level auto racing series like Formula 5000, Formula Two and Formula Atlantic at Sholavaram.

Recently, MMSC has all their race meetings in Irungattukottai, Sriperumbudur, Chennai.

== Circuits ==
The Madras Motor Sports Club owns and operates the Madras Motor Race Track in Irungattukottai, Sriperumbudur, Chennai.

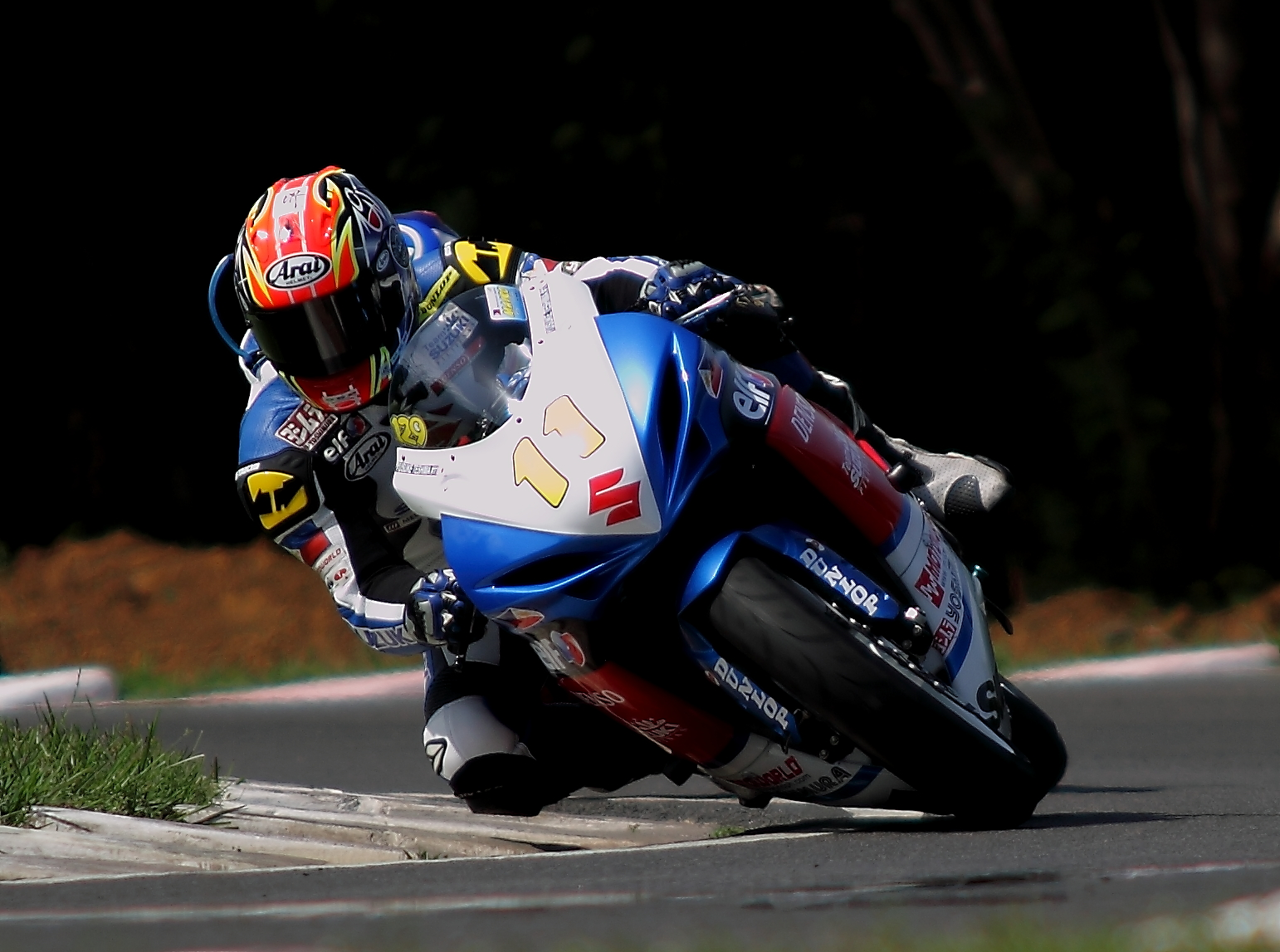

== Tamil Nadu's First Bike Racer ==
‘Tamil Nadu's First Bike Racer’, award was given to Madras Motor Sports Club.

== See also ==
- Madras International Circuit

== See also ==
- MRF Challenge
- Federation of Motor Sports Clubs of India
- SAEINDIA
- Indian National Rally Championship
- Autosports India
- Kari Motor Speedway
- Force India
- Buddh International Circuit
