= Irungattukottai =

- Village
- Irungattukottai (Tamil Nadu) Irungattukottai (India)
- Coordinates: 12°59′41.6″N 80°00′05.4″E
- Country: India
- State: Tamil Nadu
- District: Kancheepuram District
- Metro: Chennai
- Talukas: Sriperumbudur
- Elevation: 65 m (213 ft)

Languages
  - Official: Tamil
- Time zone: UTC+5:30 (IST)
- PIN: 602105
- Lok Sabha constituency: Sriperumbudur

Irungattukottai is a fast emerging neighbourhood of Chennai, strategically on the Chennai-Bangalore Highway (NH4). It is approximately 34 km from downtown Chennai. Irungatttukottai is part of the Kancheepuram District. It is Western part of the suburbs of the Chennai Metropolitan Area. It is a part of the area covered by CMDA.

Over the last decade, Irungattukottai has seen significant investments by large manufacturing industries and the Tamil Nadu Government. The State Industries Promotions Corporation of Tamil Nadu (SIPCOT) has set up a large industrial complex aimed primarily at the manufacturing industry as well as a special economic zone (SEZ) for the footwear industry.

Hyundai Motor India opened a manufacturing facility at Irungattukottai in 1998. The plant forms a critical part of Hyundai's global export hub. It currently exports to around 85 countries across Africa, Middle East, Latin America, Australia, and Asia Pacific.

India's first private air freight station is getting ready to be operational at Irungattukottai and the soft launch of the project took place on 17 July 2015.

== Colleges and schools ==
A number of engineering colleges and schools are in Irungattukottai.

- Sri Venkateswara College of Engineering: SVCE was founded by the Sri Venkateswara Educational and Health Trust (SVEHT) in 1985. The trust was founded on 1 August 1984 at the behest of Sri Jayendra Saraswathi Swamigal. The college, established by the Southern Petrochemical Industries Corporation (SPIC) group, a prominent petro-chemical corporation in India, is said to be among the top engineering colleges in Tamil Nadu, and a Tier-I institution among self-financing colleges.
- Kings Engineering College
- Maharishi Vidya Mandir: The school, at VGN, Brixton, is affiliated to the CBSE board and has classes from LKG to XII.
- St Johns International Residential School

== Dining ==
Over the last few years, a large number of speciality dining restaurants have emerged at Irungattukottai. They cater to the large number of South Korean ex-pats who work primarily for Hyundai and other Korean companies in Irungattukottai. These restaurants are mostly located on the NH4 highway.

Choki Dhani is a Rajasthan-themed entertainment centre thatserves traditional Rajasthani cuisine.

Muscat Bakery and Restaurant

== Entertainment ==
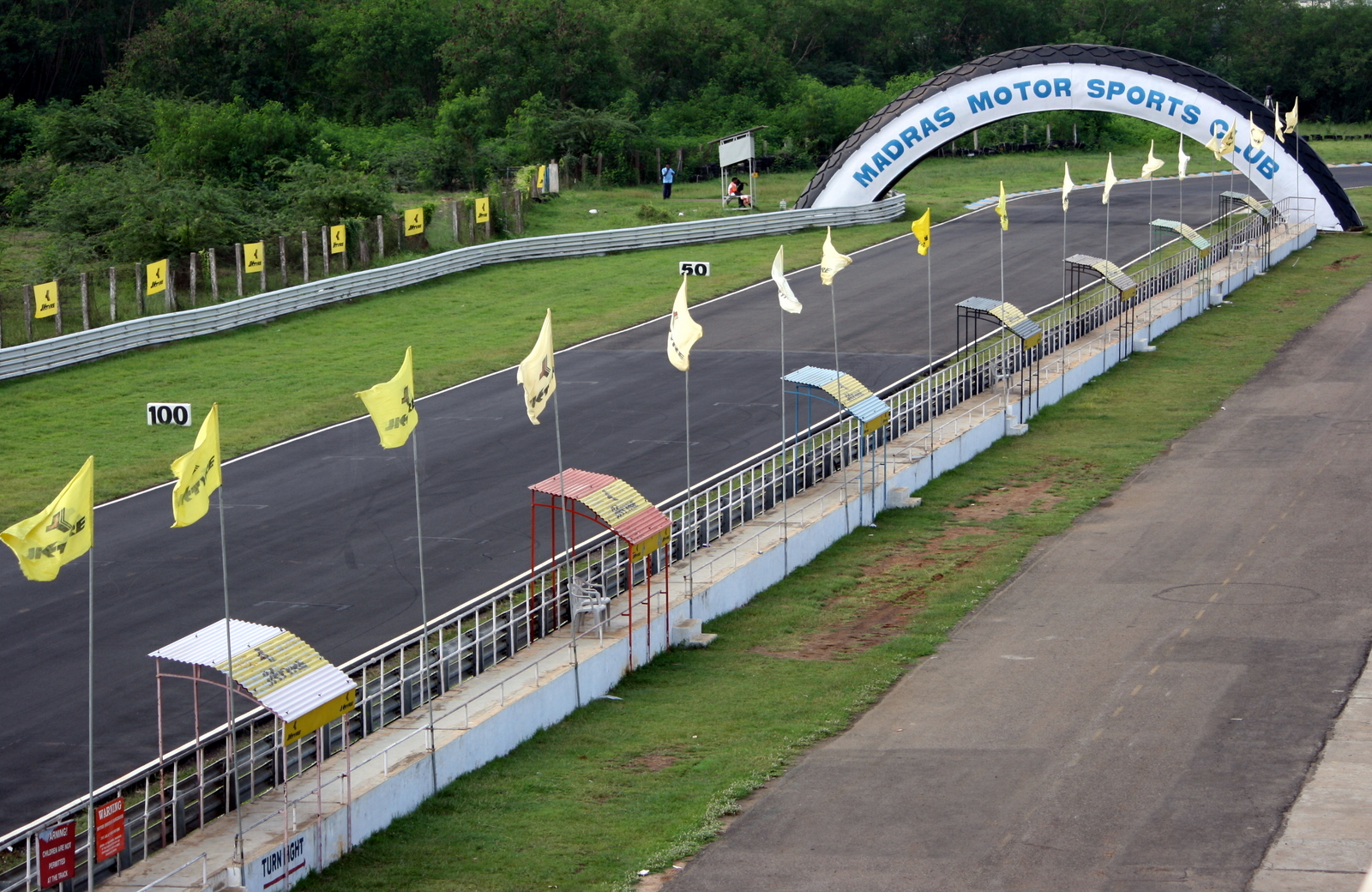
The Madras Motor Race Track at Irungattukkottai

The Madras Motor Race Track (Irungattukottai Race Track) permanent motor racing circuit is in this town. It was built in the late 1980s and was inaugurated in 1990. It is the first of its kind in India and is owned and operated by the Madras Motor Sports Club.
