= Kari Motor Speedway =

Motorsport race track in India

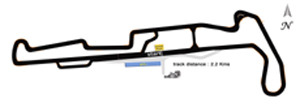
- Full Circuit (2003–present)
- Location: Chettipalayam, Coimbatore, Tamil Nadu, India
- Coordinates: 10°54′5″N 77°3′3″E
- FIA Grade: 4
- Broke ground: 2002
- Opened: 2003
- Major events: Current: F4 India (2024–present); Former: Indian Racing League (2024–2025)

Full Circuit (2003–present)
- Length: 2.100 km (1.305 mi)
- Turns: 15
- Race lap record: 1:03.296 ( (Switzerland) Neel Jani, Wolf GB08, 2024, CN)

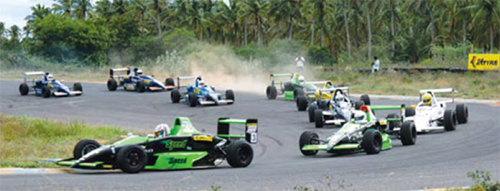
A typical raceday scene at Kari Motor Speedway

Kari Motor Speedway is a purpose-built Formula Three auto racing circuit or race track, located in Chettipalayam, Coimbatore, India. The 2.100 km (1.305 mi) long track was inaugurated in 2003. The circuit is named after S. Karivardhan.

== History ==
Part of the existing track was used as a runway for power gliders, as a part of an ultralight aviation manufacturing company owned by S. Karivardhan. The stretch was also used in the late 1990s for drag racing events. In 2002, the land was purchased by former racer B. Vijay Kumar to build a track to conduct national motorsport events and the track was inaugurated in 2003. The track is named after S.Karivardhan, who designed and built entry level race cars.

== Activities ==
The track regularly conducts the National Championship races for go-karts, motorcycle road racing and formula racing events. The track is also approved by the CIK and FIA to hold races up to the Formula 3 category. The category of cars that race in this track include Formula Maruti, Formula LGB, and Formula Rolon Chevrolet. The track is also used by motorcycle clubs, racing and karting schools and others for vehicle tests and driver training. The track also hosts Formula Bharat on a yearly basis since January 2017. Recently the track hosted first edition of FFS India 2017 in October 2017 with its second edition to be conducted in October 2018.

== Lap records ==
As of September 2026, the fastest official race lap records at the Kari Motor Speedway are listed as:

Category	Time	Driver	Vehicle	Event
Full Circuit (2003–present): 2.100 km (1.305 mi)
Group CN	1:03.296	(Switzerland) Neel Jani	Wolf-Aprilia GB08 "Thunder"	2024 1st Coimbatore Indian Racing League round
Formula 4	1:04.817	(South Africa) Luviwe Sambudla	Mygale M21-F4	2026 2nd Coimbatore F4 India round

== See also ==
- Federation of Motor Sports Clubs of India
- Indian National Rally Championship
- Madras Motor Sports Club
