= Madras International Circuit =

Motor racing circuit in Chennai, India

- Full Circuit (1990–present)

- Short Circuit (1990–present)
- Location: Irungattukottai, Chennai, India
- Coordinates: 13°0′9″N 79°59′9″E
- FIA Grade: 3
- Owner: Madras Motor Sports Club
- Broke ground: 1988
- Opened: 1990
- Former names: Madras Motor Race Track; Irungattukottai Race Track
- Major events: Current: Indian Racing League (2022–present); F4 India (2023–present); MRF Formula 2000 (2013–2020, 2022–present); Former: F4 SEA (2018–2019); Asia Road Racing Championship (1997, 2009–2011, 2013, 2017–2018); Asian F3 (2008)
- Website: en.madrasmotorsports.com

Full Circuit (1990–present)
- Length: 3.717 km (2.310 mi)
- Turns: 17
- Race lap record: 1:30.323 ( (United States) Yuven Sundaramoorthy, Dallara Formulino Pro, 2020, MRF Challenge)

Short Circuit (1990–present)
- Length: 2.067 km (1.284 mi)
- Turns: 9
- Race lap record: 0:56.257 ( (Australia) Cooper Webster, Mygale M21-F4, 2023, F4)

The Madras International Circuit (MIC, previously known as Madras Motor Race Track and Irungattukottai Race Track) is a permanent motor racing circuit located in Irungattukottai, Chennai, India. It was built in the late 1980s and was inaugurated in 1990. It was the first permanent racing circuit in India and is owned by the Madras Motor Sports Club. In July 2022, the track was renamed as Madras International Circuit.

== History ==
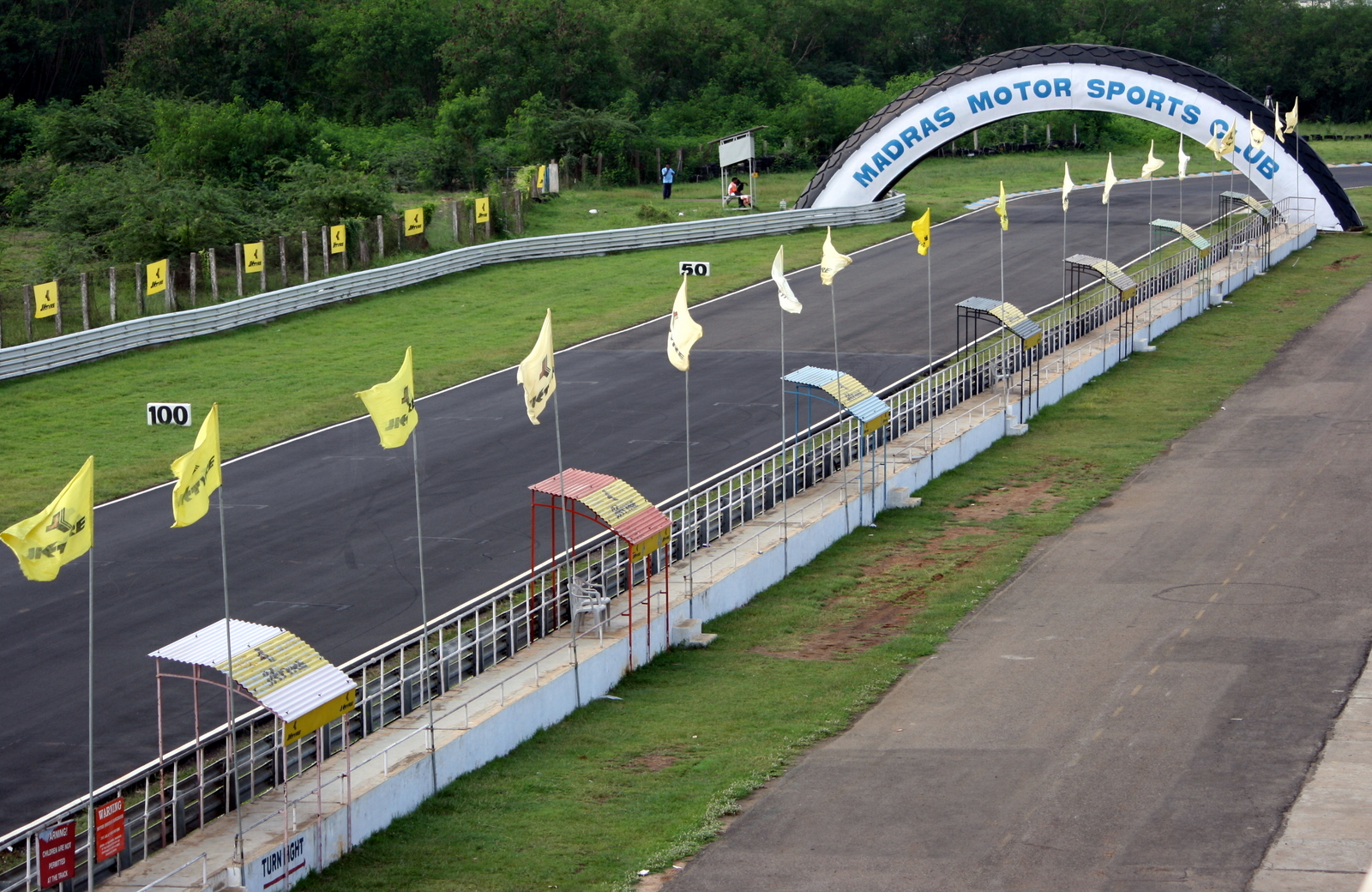
The Outer Layout

In 1971, the Madras Motor Sports Club, Coimbatore Auto Sports Club, Karnataka Motor Sports Club along with Calcutta Motor Sports Club and Mumbai's Indian Automotive Racing Club, united to form the Federation of Motor Sports Clubs of India (FMSCI), headquartered in Chennai, to ensure common regulations and orderly conduct of events. Race meets were held on airstrips at Sholavaram in Chennai, Sulur in Coimbatore and Agara in Bangalore. In 1990, the Irungattukottai track was built to provide a permanent structure for racing. Hosts the Indian Racing National Championships for both bikes and cars, and the Indian National Motorcycle Drag Racing Championships. An annual round of the MRF Challenge was held till 2020 and was since discontinued due to COVID-19.

== Karting arena ==
MMSC has also built a go-kart track to promote the sport at the grassroots level in 2023. The 1.2 km (0.75 mi) CIK approved track named, Madras International Karting Arena popular as MIKA, was inaugurated on 19 September 2024 by former Formula 1 world champion Mika Hakkinen in presence of former F1 drivers Narain Karthikeyan and Karun Chandhok.

== Layout ==
The main circuit is 3.717 km (2.310 mi) long with 12 turns and 3 straights, with the longest one being 250 m (270 yd). The club circuit is 2.067 km (1.284 mi) long and has 7 turns. Both the tracks are 11 m (12 yd) wide on average with 12 m (13 yd) at the start line and operate in a clockwise direction. The track is a Fédération Internationale de l'Automobile and Fédération Internationale de Motocyclisme-certified circuit. The tracks were resurfaced in 2007 and vehicles allowed for races include bikes of all categories and cars up to F3. FIA granted a Grade 2 license to the circuit in 2014. However, the circuit is listed as Grade 3 circuit now.

== Events ==
Current

- January: MRF Formula 2000, Formula LGB 1300, Indian Touring Car National Championship
- August: MRF Formula 2000, Formula LGB 1300, Indian Touring Car National Championship
- September: MRF Formula 2000, Formula LGB 1300, Indian Touring Car National Championship
- October: Indian Racing League, F4 Indian Championship

Former

- Asia Road Racing Championship (1997, 2009–2011, 2013, 2017–2018)
- Asian Formula Three Championship (2008)
- Formula 4 South East Asia Championship (2018–2019)

== Lap records ==
As of December 2023, the fastest official race lap records at the Madras International Circuit are listed as:

Category	Time	Driver	Vehicle	Event
Full Circuit (1990–present): 3.717 km (2.310 mi)
MRF Challenge	1:30.323	Yuven Sundaramoorthy	Dallara Formulino Pro	2020 Madras MRF Challenge round
CN	1:30.681	Rishon Rajeev	Wolf GB08 Thunder	2022 2nd Madras Indian Racing League round
Formula 4	1:36.496	Cooper Webster	Mygale M21-F4	2023 4th Madras F4 India round
Supersport	1:41.057	Yuuki Ito	Yamaha YZF-R6	2018 Madras ARRC round
Asia Production 250	1:48.148	Rheza Danica Ahrens	Honda CBR250RR	2018 Madras ARRC round
Asia Underbone 150	1:52.184	Fazli Ahmad Fazli Sham	Yamaha T-150	2018 Madras ARRC round
Short Circuit (1990–present): 2.067 km (1.284 mi)
Formula 4	0:56.257	Cooper Webster	Mygale M21-F4	2023 3rd Madras F4 India round

== See also ==
- Madras Motor Sports Club
