= Musa Sherif =

Indian rally co-driver

Personal information
- Full name: Musa Sherif
- Born: 7 September 1971 (age 55); Kumbla, Kasaragod, Kerala, India

World Rally Championship record
- Years active: 1993–
- Teams: Team MRF (INRC), Team JK (INRC), Team India Rally (APRC), Mahindra adventure
- Rallies: n/a
- Championships: National INRC: 7(2007, 2009, 2011, 2014, 2017, 2018,2020)
- Rally wins: over 100 overall wins
- Podiums: n/a
- Stage wins: n/a
- Total points: n/a
- First rally: 1993
- First win: 2003
- Last win: 2020 Indian National Rally Championship
- Last rally: 2020 Indian National Rally Championship

Musa Sherif (born 7 September 1971) is an Indian motorsports professional and an eight-time Indian national champion co-driver competing in the Indian National Rally Championship (INRC). With Naveen Puligilla as the driver, he became the first Indian co-driver to get a podium in any class of the World Rally Championship at Jeddah in November2025 when the duo finished second in the WRC3 class at the Saudi Arabia Rally, the WRC 2025 final round.

== Early life ==
Sherif was born in Kumble, a small town in Kasargod district. He made his debut in 1993 and became the first Indian to complete 300 rallies, both in two-wheeler and four-wheelers in all formats of rallying including TSD rallies.

== Career ==
Sherif got hooked on rallying in 1993 when he competed in the Mandovi rally at Mangalore as a rider and shifted to four-wheelers in 1995. He currently competes in yellow colours with JK Tyre team and navigates for seven-time National champion driver Gaurav Gill. The duo won the popular Karnataka 1000 rally, the second round of the delayed INRC 2021 where he completed 300 rallies including 69 international rallies. He also won 35 rounds of the INRC of which 33 came with Gaurav Gill in front of the steering wheel.

Sherif also entered the Limca Book of Records in 2011 for navigating for and winning three championship titles in a year (2009).

National championship winners

Season	Driver	Co-Driver	Team	Car	Tuner	Governing body
2007	(India) Gaurav Gill	Musa Sherif	Team MRF	Mitsubishi Cedia Group N	J.Anand	MAI
2009	(India) Gaurav Gill	Musa Sherif	Team MRF	Mitsubishi Cedia Group N+	J.Anand	FMSCI
2011	(India) Gaurav Gill	Musa Sherif	MRF	Mitsubishi Cedia Group N+	J.Anand	FMSCI
2014	(India) Gaurav Gill	Musa Sherif	Mahindra Adventure	Mahindra XUV500	N. Leelakrishnan	FMSCI
2017	(India) Gaurav Gill	Musa Sherif	Mahindra Adventure	Mahindra XUV500	N. Leelakrishnan	FMSCI
2018	(India) Gaurav Gill	Musa Sherif	Mahindra Adventure	Mahindra XUV500	N. Leelakrishnan	FMSCI
2020	(India) Gaurav Gill	Musa Sherif	JK Tyre Racing	Mahindra XUV300	N Leelakrishnan,	FMSCI
2024	Karna Kadur	Musa Sherif	Arka Motorsports	Volkswagen Polo	N Leelakrishnan	FMSCI
