= Karnataka Motor Sports Club =

Indian motorsport club

Karnataka Motor Sports Club, popularly known as KMSC, is a state association for promoting and conducting motorsports in the Indian state of Karnataka. The club is based in Bengaluru. It is a founder member of the Federation of Motor Sports Club of India (FMSCI), the governing body for motor sports in India. It is one of the oldest ‘active’ motorsports clubs in India. It holds the record of organising the Karnataka 1000 rally (K1000 rally) continuously for the last 48 years since 1975, except for two years and is the oldest rally in India.

KMSC was started by a group of petrol heads, under the stewardship of Fred Webb, in 1954 under the initial name, Bangalore Motor Sports Club. After a meeting with like-minded people including Cyril Doveton and John Webb (Fred's son) in the same year, the club was started and Fred Webb became its first president. Both Webb and Junior Webb took great interest in the club motorsports activities and conducted regular drag races at Yelahanka and Jakkur air strips. They also took part in other parts of the country, specially Sholavaram. Then the club played a great role in starting the Federation, FMSCI and later changed its nomen clature from Bangalore Motor Sports Club to KMSC. Over the years, the Karnataka 1000 rally, which was started in 1975, became one of the flagship events of the club. It is one of the oldest rallies conducted regularly in the world. It had a break for a couple of years due to reasons beyond the club's control. Other similar clubs in Karnataka are Chikmagalur Motor Sports Club, Motorsports Association of Vijayanagar, and Motorsports Inc which have also conducted National championship rounds.

== K1000 rally ==
The Karnataka 1000 Rally, an annual rally run on Time, Speed, Distance, the TSD format over two to three days, was started in 1975. In the early years, the K1000 ran over 1000 miles covering dirt tracks of three states, Karnataka, Tamil Nadu and Andhra Pradesh. Over the years it became a popular destination for the top motorsports rally drivers in the country. In 1988, it joined the National calendar as it was included as a round in the Indian National Rally Championship. In 1996, the rally shifted to European Special Stage format in line with all other INRC rounds under the aegis of FMSCI.

The first rally run in 1975 over 1850 km of mixed roads including gravel, kutcha, tarmac, was won by a Bangalore team Sivaram, D. Vinod Sivappa, Feroze Asgar Ali and Shivprasad, Bangalore in an ambassador. Those days, there used to be four drivers as the route is long with night driving. For the last few years, the rally is being held on the dirt tracks, near Gubbi in Tumakuru district. The 2022 K1000 rally was won by Karna Kadur and co-driver Nikhil Pai. It was Kadur's maiden K1000 title. The 47th and 48th editions were also held in Tumakuru. The 47th edition was held from 21 to 23 December 2023.

== Office-bearers ==
KMSC is headed by Gautam Shantappa, who is also the vice-president of FMSCI, with Bhaskar Gupta as vice-president. The office-bearers of the club were elected on 12 November 2020 and the president and vice-president were reelected for a second term. In 2020, former K1000 champion in his class, Sanjeev Shah, is elected as the new general secretary. BS Prakash became the joint secretary while MD Sathyavratha is the treasurer. Former secretary, Praneet Perumal, Janardan Babu and Shanmuga were the members of the managing committee. Advocate VS Harish is co-opted as legal adviser.

In the earlier years, BMSC's AD Jayaram was the FMSCI president in the year 1974–75. Other FMSCI presidents from KMSC include Ravi Gupta in 1980–81, Shramik Masturlal from 1996 to 99.and R Bharat Raj in 2014–15. Goutham Shanthappa was the vice-president for 2022–24. Earlier, Shivu Shivappa, the then president of KMSC served as vice-president for a term of two years from 2018.

== See also ==
- Madras Motor Sports Club
- Federation of Motor Sports Clubs of India
- Indian National Rally Championship
- Motorsports in India
