= Arjun Balu =

Indian motorsports driver

Arjun Balu (18 January 1975) is an Indian motorsports driver. After starting as a road racing driver in 1992, he took part in the Indian National Rally Championship for 17 years. He won 11 Championships, all in road racing and is currently racing in the Indian Touring Car (ITC) class in the MRF MMSC fmsci Indian National Car Racing Championship 2023. He is the reigning National champion in the ITC class (2022).

Four of Arjun Balu's title victories were won before the championship got the Indian National status. He won events in both rallying and road racing.

== Early career ==
Born in Coimbatore, Arjun Balu began his motorsports career as a teenager in 1992 with JK Tyre and shifted to rallying in 1995 as a team member of MRF, one of the premier rally teams in the Indian National Rally Championship (INRC). He represented the team for 17 years till he retired from Rallying in 2011 at the Coffee Day rally at Chikmagalur.

== Motorsports career ==
Arjun Balu began as a racing driver 1992 in the Indian Grand Prix at Irungattukottai track. He raced for JK Tyre team along with his brother Sanjay Balu in 1993. After making his rally debut in the INRC in 1994 at the home rally, he was roped in by MRF as one of their top two drivers in 1995. Despite many victories, the National Rally Championship title eluded him and he retired from rallying after 17 years in 2011. But he made a comeback for road racing Nationals, taking part in touring car races at Coimbatore in 2012 and continued in 2013. Arjun Balu's three-decade long career saw him win five titles in FISSME (Formula India Single Seater Maruti Engine) races, popularly known as Formula Maruti India. Then he won Formula Ford 1600cc and along with one Esteem class National title and four ITC titles, he is credited with 11 Indian National Championship victories.

After a gap of five years, Race Concepts Motorsports team principal Joel Joseph offered to prepare a car for Balu, if he is willing to make another comeback. Balu returned to circuit racing in 2018. In his third attempt after the comeback, he won the ITC National title in 2020 and went on to add two more Championship victories in 2021 and 2022.

He took part in the MRF Formula 1600 in 2010 and 2011 and became the National Champion in the Indian Touring Car championship in 2012. Then after a five-year hiatus, Arjun Balu came back to circuit racing in 2018 taking part in the Nationals as part of Race Concepts Motorsports team.

As a rally driver, Arjun Balu won in 1999 the famous South India Rally (SIR), the third round of INRC, along with co-driver Kumar Ramaswamy in an Esteem and took another victory at Hyderabad in December winning the Deccan Rally, the last round of the INRC 1999. He won in Goa in 2003 and came second in the MRF Taj Challenge Rally at the then Calcutta in June 2003. In 2009, he won the popular K1000 rally along with Sujith Kumar BS as navigator and took Indian cricket player Mahendra Singh Dhoni, who attended the rally as a Chief Guest, on a spin on the Super Special Stage track before receiving the trophy from the cricketer.

Arjun Balu remained as the driver for the second team of MRF which deprived him of many results. His first international rally victory came in 2001 in Changchun, China where he won the Asia Zone Rally Championship (AZRC), the precursor to the Asia Pacific Rally Championship (APRC).

Balu has also volunteered to mentor women athletes to promote FIA Women in Motorsports concept.
