= Karna Kadur =

Indian rally driver (born 1988)

- Nationality: Indian
- Born: Karna Kadur; 24 June 1988 (age 38) Bengaluru, Karnataka, India

Karna Kadur (born 24 June 1988) is an Indian National Rally driver from Karnataka. He began with National racing series and also achieved immense success in Indian rallying with seven National rally titles in different classes. He won three overall National Rally Championship victories 2016, 2022 & 2024 with Arka Motorsports. He is with Arka Motorsports and drives in MRF Tyres colours under the mentorship of N Leelakrishnan, his mentor, engineer and tuner. He is also the first driver to get a National Championship title for Volkswagen Polo along with co-driver Nikhil Pai.

== Motorsport career ==
Kadur started with a Motocross bike at six and by nine was taking part in local Motocross events. His parents Prakash Kadur (former Indian rally driver & supporter of the sport) and Nirmala Prakash were instrumental in showing support in his career. Later Karna moved on to Karting Championship events and eventually made his way to the National Racing championship where he drove the Formula Rolon series till 2006. In 2009, Kadur took a short break after suffering a shock loss in his family and returned with rallying as a privateer in his first outing.

In the same year, Kadur was selected through Red Rooster Racing's Talent Identification Programme by N. Leelakrishnan and went on to win the Rally Star Cup Championship. He was the Motorsports Manager and development driver with Red Rooster Performance in 2009.

In 2010, Kadur was promoted as the team's fourth driver in a Mitsubishi Group N Cedia. He was also the Driving Instructor at Red Rooster Performance Motorsports Academy. However, Red Rooster Racing pulled out of motorsports citing lack of sponsorship at the end of the season.

In 2011, Kadur participated as a privateer supported by Red Rooster Performance and went on to win his first national title in the Group N Indian National Rally championship.

In 2012, Kadur finished 1st runner up in the overall Indian National Rally Championship driving a Mitsubishi Group N Cedia prepared by N.Leelakrishnan of Red Rooster Performance.

In 2014, Kadur was the stand-in driver for Team Mahindra Adventure.

In 2015, Kadur was brought in as the second driver at Team Yokohama India. He partnered with an Australia-based Indian International Co-Driver Vivek Ponnusamy. He went on to drive a Group N Volkswagen Polo prepared by N. Leelakrishnan of Red Rooster Performance. The pair won the 1600 Group N championship.

Team Yokohama India had fielded a car each in the INRC 2000 & INRC 1600 categories. A Volkswagen Polo driven by Kadur and co-driven by Nikhil V. Pai in the INRC 1600 and a Mitsubishi Cedia driven by Rahul Kantharaj and Vivek Bhat in the INRC 2000. Both the cars were prepared by Leelakrishnan of Red Rooster Performance. Their victory helped Team Yokohama India to secure the Team Championship in the group N 1600 and 2000 respectively for the first time since its inception.

In 2016, was the turnaround year in Kadur's career. Still driving for Team Yokohama, he partnered with the country's most-experienced co-driver, Nikhil Pai. Kadur's co-Driver Nikhil V. Pai happens to have over 35 years of motorsport experience as well as having co-driven for the top drivers in the country since the early 1980s. Team Yokohama India had fielded two cars in the INRC 2000, a Volkswagen Polo driven by Kadurand co-driven by Nikhil and a Mitsubishi Cedia driven by Rahul Kantharaj and Vivek Bhat. Both the cars were prepared by N.Leelakrishnan of Red Rooster Performance

While the team's primary goal was to secure yet another subcategory national title, the surprise was indeed in store. At the first rally in Coimbatore, Kadur suffered an electrical issue during the rally and had to be content with finishing third in the INRC 2000 and fourth overall. Tragically after the scrutiny of the rally, the rally car on its way back to the base, caught fire and was gutted. With the next round in three weeks at Nashik and no time to source, a new car The Team at Red Rooster Performance managed to put the same car back together under the parts support from Volkswagen Motorsports India. Karna did not disappoint his team's efforts and secured a well fought second place in Nashik having just lost by 1 second and in the third round in Rally de North even managed to defeat the mightier Mahindra's XUV's to finish an overall second to the Volkswagen Polo R2 spec of Arjun Rao. Next up at the season's fourth round at Coffee Day India Rally – an Asia Pacific Rally Championship as well, Kadur and co-driver Nikhil dominated the event and went on to win the Overall National Championship by finishing an overall first with still a round to spare at Bangalore the following month. This is Volkswagen Polo's first overall rally victory in the country after 4 years of its inception in this field. Also, this being a group N spec car it proved to be mightier than the more powerful cars in the field for the 2016 season.

As of 2017, Kadur is back, participating in the MRF FMSCI Indian National Rally Championship, along with co-driver Nikhil Pai, as the defending title champion driver and placed second overall and first in the INRC 2 Class at the Rally of Coimbatore.

In 2022, Kadur and Nikhil Pai once again won the fmsci Blueband Indian National Rally Championship (INRC) for four-wheelers with a round to spare.

In 2024, Kadur and Musa Sherif paired up after Nikhil Pai Chose to retire and move overseas. The pairing of Kadur & Sherif proved fruitful with Kadur clinching his third overall national title & ensuring Musa clinched his record eighth overall national title. They are supported by MRF Tyres / Rally team and also went onto drive as the second team for Toyota Gazoo Racing / TRD / TCD team in Thailand their first outing in a 4 WD Toyota CHR – a fully supported program lasted three rounds of the Thailand Championship with them having missed the fourth round owing to a date clash with the Indian Rally Championship. They are fully backed & mentored by the Indian tuner & team principle N Leelakrishnan of Arka motorsports, Coimbatore.
