= Philippos Matthai =

Indian rally driver

Personal information
- Nationality: Indian
- Born: September 22, 1983 (age 42) Delhi, India
- Years active: 2000s–present

Sport
- Country: India
- Sport: Motorsport

Philippos Matthai (born 22 September 1983) a motorsports athlete from Delhi. He is a rally driver and a multiple national champion in various motorsports disciplines like autocross, sprint, gymkhana and rally.

He is a native of Kerala and resides in Delhi.

In April 2024, he won two national titles in the fmsci 2023 Indian National Autocross Championship in the INAC 1 Open and INAC 1 (1,651cc to 2,400cc) classes held at the Nanoli Stud Farm near Pune. In 2024, he won two Indian national titles in the fmsci National Rally Sprint championship in Rally Sprint 1 and 2 classes.

In June 2025, he won four categories in the second round of Octane Pits FMSCI Indian National Autocross Championship 2025.
