= Liberty Cinema =

Cinema in Mumbai, India

Coordinates: 18.9844°N 72.7511°E

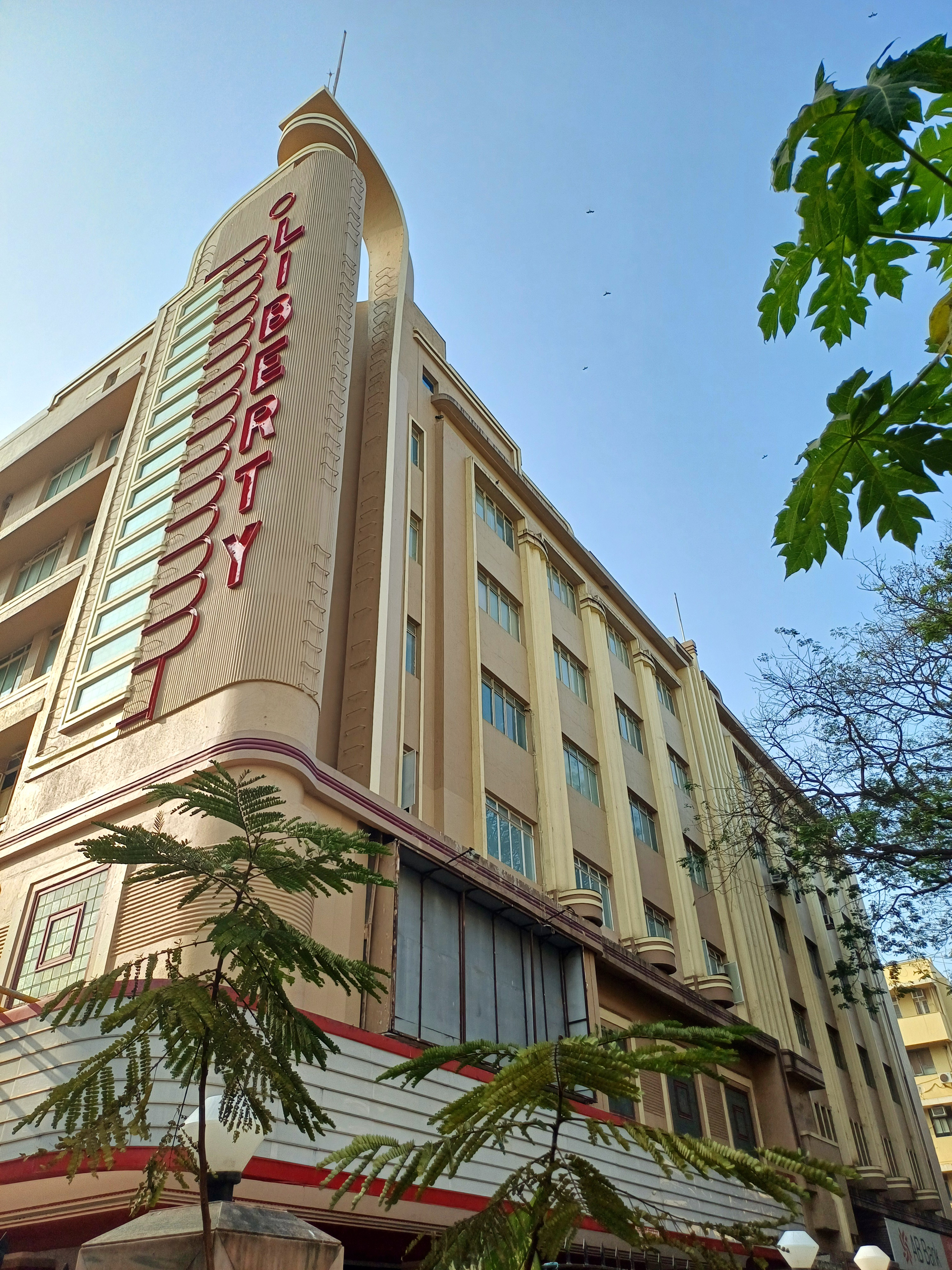
- Façade of Liberty Cinema in 2024
- Interactive map of Liberty Cinema
- Location: New Marine Lines, Mumbai, India
- Type: Cinema Hall
- Public transit: Marine Lines

Construction
- Groundbreaking: 1947; 79 years ago
- Opened: 1949; 77 years ago
- Architect: M.A. Riddley Abbott

Liberty Cinema is an Art Deco 1200 seater single screen Movie theatre in Mumbai, India. Since the cinema was built in 1947, the year of Indian Independence, its founder Habib Hoosein decided to name it "Liberty". Liberty screens Bollywood Hindi movies. David Vinnels and Brent Skelly describe Liberty Cinema as "an exquisite jewel box of rococo decoration enhanced by a coloured lighting scheme suggesting a fairyland far away from the bustle and tumult in the streets outside" in their book Bollywood Showplaces: Cinema Theatres in India. On the fifth floor of the Liberty Cinema building there is a small 30 seater hall, Liberty Mini. Decorated with art from the pre-independence period, it is used for press previews and private screenings. Liberty has been the location of movie premiers of several movies, such as Mughal-e-Azam (a 1960 blockbuster Bollywood movie).

Several iconic movies have premiered and run for a long time at Liberty Cinema. Mother India, a Bollywood film ran for a whole year starting October 1957 at Liberty. Almost three decades later, one of Bollywood’s most successful movies Hum Aapke Hain Kaun ran for 105 weeks in regular shows and 16 weeks in the matinee show in total from 1994 onwards at Liberty (completing its 100th week on the run in August 1996). In total the film ran for 2341 shows in 847 days from its first run. To celebrate this, noted painter M F Husain put up a canvas from his series celebrating the Woman as 'Shakti' at the foyer of Liberty Cinema. This piece of art was based on the lead actress of the movie, Madhuri Dixit.

With the entry of multiplex theatres in Mumbai which have been given tax breaks, single screen theatres like Liberty are finding it hard to do business. The current owner, Nazir Hoosein (son of the founder) has rented out part of the Liberty Cinema building for office use to supplement his income.
