= Nikhil Pai =

Indian rally co-driver

Nikhil Vittal Pai (born 2 October 1971) is an Indian rally co-driver who won the Indian National Rally Championship (INRC) for four-wheelers twice in 2016 and 2022. He is one of the most-experienced co-drivers currently taking part in INRC for four-wheelers from 1992.

Pai is a sound engineer by profession with experience in the live sound industry and as a motor sports athlete. He started his motor sport career on motorcycles as a navigator and later moved to cars, also as a co-driver. He started his rallying career as a co-driver in 1992.

== Personal life and education ==
Pai was born in Secunderabad, Andhra Pradesh, to Y. Vittal Pai and Susheela Pai. His father Vittal Pai was in the Indian Administrative Service. He graduated in Hotel Management from the Institute of Hotel Management, Catering Technology & Applied Nutrition, Hyderabad in 1992.

== Motor sports career ==
In 1992, Pai started as a club-level rally co-driver aboard a two-wheeler. His first break into the prestigious Indian National Rally Championship was in the same year when he was the co-driver for a private entry from Hyderabad.

In 2002, Pai and Jiby Maliakkal from Mumbai dominated the 1400cc category and won the National Champion Co-Driver award in that category. The duo won their first Overall victory in the 2003 MRF India Rally. The partnership endured for a few more years despite repeated setbacks in different rallies.

In 2005, Pai teamed up with Vikram Mathias, the 2004 National Overall Champion, as part of the Red Rooster Racing team and their debut for the new team resulted in a second-place finish in the K 1000 Rally, a round of the National Championship (INRC) and they also came third in Pine Forest Challenge Rally held in Chandigarh, also a round of INRC 2005.

In 2009, Pai won the National Co-Driver Championship once again in the 1400cc category with Vikram Devadasen winning by a comfortable margin. By then Pai shifted base from Hyderabad to Bengaluru and won the popular K1000, a round of the INRC in 1400cc class. This was also the time when Karna Kadur was emerging as a rally champion.

Pai partnered with Sirish Chandran from Pune, then editor of India's leading auto magazine, Overdrive. From 2010, the pair participated in a series of rallies, and got a first win for Volkswagen Polo in March 2013 at Chennai in the 1600cc class. Polo, which made its debut in the national championship, later went on to win the title in 2016.

In 2016, Pai teamed up with Karna Kadur from Bengaluru. It was a turn-around year for the duo, winning not just the 2000cc category but also clinching the Overall National Rally Championship in their first year of partnership.

In 2017, Pai and Karna Kadur finished 3rd in the Overall category of the Indian National Rally Championship.

In 2018, Pai and Karna Kadur notched up an Overall round victory in the Coffee Day Rally at Chikkamagaluru on way to a victory in the INRC2 Championship. They also finished 3rd in the Overall Championship.

In 2022 Pai and Karna Kadur won the Overall Championship in the Indian National Rally Championship.

By the end of the last round of the INRC 2023, Pai had taken part in 117 INRC rounds eight of which he won and made it to the podium 62 times. His last rally appearance was at the K1000 rally in Tamakuru.

== Career as a sound engineer ==
As a bass guitarist, Pai started his own band at the age of 18 in Hyderabad and soon developed interest and started mixing for concerts. Soon he also started his own company Orpheus in Hyderabad. He worked on several festivals, corporate events and international tours. Currently, he is the touring sound engineer for Agam, the Fusion Rock Act from Bengaluru, Sid Sriram, Indian Popular Music Act from Chennai/California, Andrea Jeremiah, Indian Actress and singer and Shillong Chamber Choir, a Bollywood Choir Group. He is the sound engineer for Agam from 2014 onwards.

== National titles ==
Pai has won six National Co-Driver Championship titles. The co-driver who made his debut in 1992 won his maiden title in 2002 and is the current reigning National champion with driver Karna Kadur.

- 2022 Overall winner with driver Karna Kadur;
- 2018 INRC 2 winner with driver Karna Kadur;
- 2016 Overall winner with driver Karna Kadur;
- 2016 2000cc winner with Karna Kadur;
- 2009 1400cc winner with Vikram Devadasan;
- 2002 1400cc winner with Jiby Maliakkal;

== International victories ==
1. 2022 Asia Cup Overall winner of the first round of Asia Pacific Rally Championship (Asia Cup) with Karna Kadur at the fmsci South India Rally (SIR), a round of INRC run concurrently with APRC Asia Cup round.
