= Hoosein =

Hoosein is a surname. Notable people with the surname include:

- Mehnaz Hoosein (born 1973), Indian singer
- Nazir Hoosein (1940/41–2019), Indian racing driver and motorsport administrator
