= Red Rooster Racing =

Former Indian motorsport racing team

(India) Red Rooster Racing
- Founded: 2008
- Team principal(s): Dinesh Reddy
- Noted drivers: Arjun Narendran, Leela Krishnan, Naren Kumar, Vikram Mathias, Karna Kadur, Amittrajit Ghosh, Ram Kumar, PVS Murthy, Ashwin Naik, Ashish Saurabh Moudghil, Rajini Krishnan
- Teams' Championships: Indian National Rally
- Drivers' Championships: Indian National Rally Champions, Raid de Himalaya, Asian road racing championship

Red Rooster Racing is an Indian Motorsports team which took part in rallying and racing events for three years from 2008 to 2010. Its parent company Red Rooster Performance's goal is to build the market for performance motoring in India. Quoting lack of sponsors, the team withdrew from the Indian National Rally Championship (INRC) before the start of the 2011 season. Of the three years in rallying, Red Rooster Racing' won the championship twice in 2008 and 2010. Red Rooster teams, Vikram Mathias and co-driver PVS Murthy won INRC 2008 while VR Naren Kumar won the title in 2010 along with co-driver Ram Kumar.

Red Rooster Racing entered Indian motorsports on 8 June 2008 in multiple disciplines including rallying (cars and motorcycles), circuit racing (cars and motorcycles), and karting. It was the only team which took part in different disciplines of motorsport for a three-year period. Apart from INRC, Red Rooster Racing teams took part in National Racing Championship both for cars and bikes. It also took part in a rally raid cross-country event by entering Raid de Himalaya in 2009 and the Asian Road Racing Championship in 2009.

The team was founded by Dinesh Reddy, a third-generation entrepreneur, and former director of family-owned Nutrine Confectionery Limited.

Multiple rally champion and reputed tuner N. Leelakrishnan joined as technical director of Red Rooster Racing along with Andrew Morrice of Mezzo International, Singapore. The team is reported to have spent Rs.2 crore in the first year to set up the teams.

== Achievements ==
The company's objective was to promote Indian talent in a wide range of motorsport disciplines.

The team took part in the Malaysian Motorbike Super Series, the PETRONAS FIM Asian GP series, held in 2008 and scored podium standings in the Expert and Novice disciplines.

Other achievements include:

- 1st and 3rd rank in Indian National Rally Championship in 2008
- 1st, 2nd and 3rd in the National Circuit Road Racing Championship in 2008
- 1st in the FIM ARRC Motorcycles circuit (National & Asia Pacific) Asian Road Racing Championship.
