= V. R. Naren Kumar =

Indian rally driver

Personal information
- Nationality: (India) Indian
- Born: 29 July 1974 (age 52)

World Rally Championship record
- Years active: 1994–2010
- Teams: Team MRF (INRC), Team JK (INRC), Team India Rally (APRC), Team Sidvin India (PWRC), Team Red Rooster Racing (INRC)
- Rallies: n/a
- Championships: National INRC: 7(1999, 2000, 2002, 2003, 2005, 2006,2010); Asia Zone : 1 (2001)
- Rally wins: n/a
- Podiums: n/a
- Stage wins: n/a
- Total points: n/a
- First rally: 1994 Cotton City Challenge, Coimbatore, India
- First win: 1995
- Last win: 2010 Jodhpur Rally
- Last rally: 2010 Jodhpur Rally

Velappan Rajendran Naren Kumar is a seven-time Indian National Rally Championship Champion and two-time runner-up and Asia Zone Champion from Coimbatore, India.

Kumar started his career as a privateer in 1993 and was quickly picked up by Team MRF, operated by another Rally driver N. Leelakrishnan. Naren Kumar is also the first Indian from India to compete in the WRC championship (in Group N Category) driving a factory-supported works Subaru Impreza World Rally Car for Team Sidvin India (supported by Four time WRC Rally Champion Tommi Makinen. After a 4-year gap he entered the 2010 INRC championship in its second season and winning his last title. He announced his retirement from Rallying in 2011.

== National Championship ==
In India, he won four championships for Team MRF, including an Asia Zone Championship in Honda Civic then switched to Team JK, who themselves reappeared into the rallying scene after a seven-year gap, just to sponsor Naren and won another two championships. Yet Naren won the 2005 crown for JK in a rally tyre pulled out of their old stock.

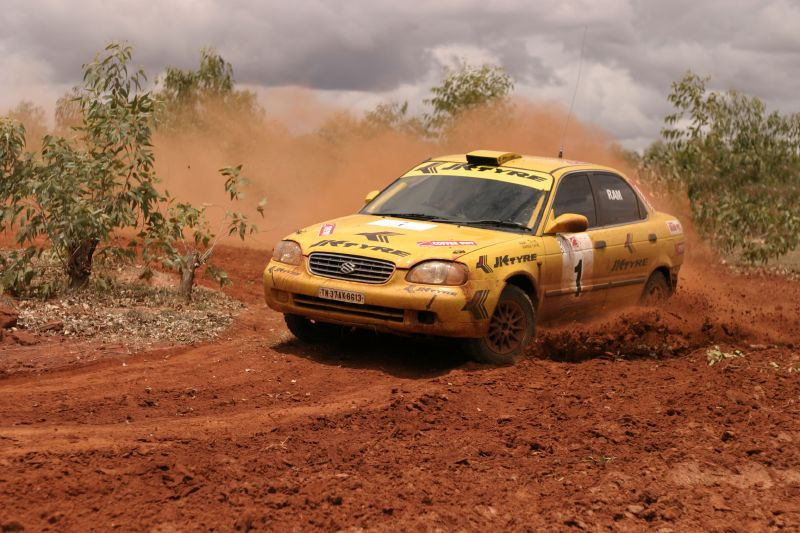
Naren Kumar and Ramkumar in a Group A Maruti Baleno Rally Car in Mysore Safari Rally in 2005.

He won the National Championships in the years 2010, 2006, 2005, 2003, 2002, 2000, 1999 and Runner-up in 2001 and 2004 which was mainly due APRC Commitments.

== International Championships ==
=== Asia Pacific ===
Currently (2007) Naren is participating in the 2007 FIA Asia Pacific Rally Championship, and is within top 5 places. His entry as a privateer with part support from Sidvin and Red Rooster Racing made him the top title contender among the other privateers, while all his close rivals are factory teams. He however finished fourth in the championships and with a podium (Second overall) and by the end of the season he was invited for a test drive by Subaru World Rally Team.

Naren Kumar and Jeff Judd in a Mitsubishi Evolution 8 World Rally Car in APRC round two of New Zealand Rally in 2008.

== World Rally Championship ==
=== Team Abarth offer ===
In 2005 the Italian team and Fiat/Lancia tuning specialist Abarth offered a drive for Naren. But he could not raise the required sponsorship at that time and opted for APRC.

=== Subaru WRC Testing ===
During the end of 2007 APRC season where Team Subaru impressed with his driving skills offered him a test drive session. The early month of October 2007 saw Naren in Wales, England testing for the new Subaru Impreza Group N World Rally for Subaru World Rally Team.

=== Production Car World Rally Championship (P-WRC) ===
In early February 2008, Team Sidvin was launched technical and vehicle support from four-time world rally champion Tommi Makinen's Racity Oy Limited. Naren Kumar will start in the Production Car World Rally Championship (P-WRC) series run alongside the regular WRC series. Naren Kumar will be driving a Subaru Impreza. His main sponsor will be the Bengaluru-based oil and gas company Sidvin Core-Tech. During mid-season Naren was replaced by Gaurav Gill from India who added more Did-Not-Finish to the team.

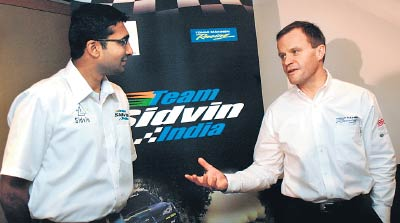
Naren Kumar and Four time WRC Champion Tommi Makinen announcing the launch of Team Sidvin India.

=== Return to Indian National Rally Championship (INRC) ===
After a 2-year hiatus Naren returned to a full season of INRC in the newly formed team Red Rooster racing. Tuned by ace tuner and rallyist N. Leela Krishnan, Naren actually joined the second rally in the season and easily winning the 2010 title, thus making him the most successful Four Wheeler Rally champion in India.

=== Retirement ===
For the 2011 season Team Red Rooster Racing withdrew from motorsports, thus leaving only team MRF and some privateers in the title bid. Naren Kumar on 22 July 2011, finally announced his retirement from Rallying just few days short of his 37th birthday.

== Sources ==
- Personal Profile in FIA site
- Article in Hindu (subscription required)
- WRC offer
- Interview in Mumbai Mirror
- Retirement
- The Hindu: Final title
- Driver Profile & Interview in www.rally.co.in website

.
