= N. Leelakrishnan =

Indian racing driver and tuner

Narayanaswamy "N." Leelakrishnan, also known as Leela in Indian motorsport circles, is a six-time Indian National Rally Championship Champion and one time Indian Formula 3 champion from Coimbatore, India. He is also a rally and race car tuner and is currently the Chief Technical Director of Red Rooster Racing.

His rally tuned cars have won 15 National Championship titles—driven by himself, V. R. Naren Kumar and Vikram Mathias—winning the tuners trophy several times. Now he owns his own team, arka motorsports, Coimbatore. He runs the factory teams for Mahindra and Toyota.

== Early career ==
N. Leelakrishnan was born in Coimbatore and did his education in Coimbatore. His family had an engineering firm involved in manufacturing electric motors. N. Leelakrishnan having keen interest in motorsports during his school days, started his career as a race car tuner even while in college, preparing Mopeds, Premier Padmini's, Sipani Dolphins for the All India Grand Prix races held at Sholavaram and other motorsport events in Coimbatore. He was also one of the principle tuners for S. Karivardhan’s Team Super Speeds in late 80's. He also participated in some of the Dirt and track events between years 1983 and 1988.

== Rallying career ==
=== Popular Rally Team ===
In 1987, N. Leelakrishnan was a tuner for the Cochin based Popular Rally Team, owned by Popular Automobiles, Cochin. For the Coffee 500 rally in Chikmagalur, N. Leelakrishnan substituted the regular driver Upendra Narayanan who had fallen ill and won that event. In the same year he also entered and won the Charminar Challenge Rally in Hyderabad. After a hiatus in 1988, he entered the McDowell Rally D ’Endurance and won a second place after a terrific duel with the then reigning INRC champion (newly introduced in 1988).

=== MRF years ===
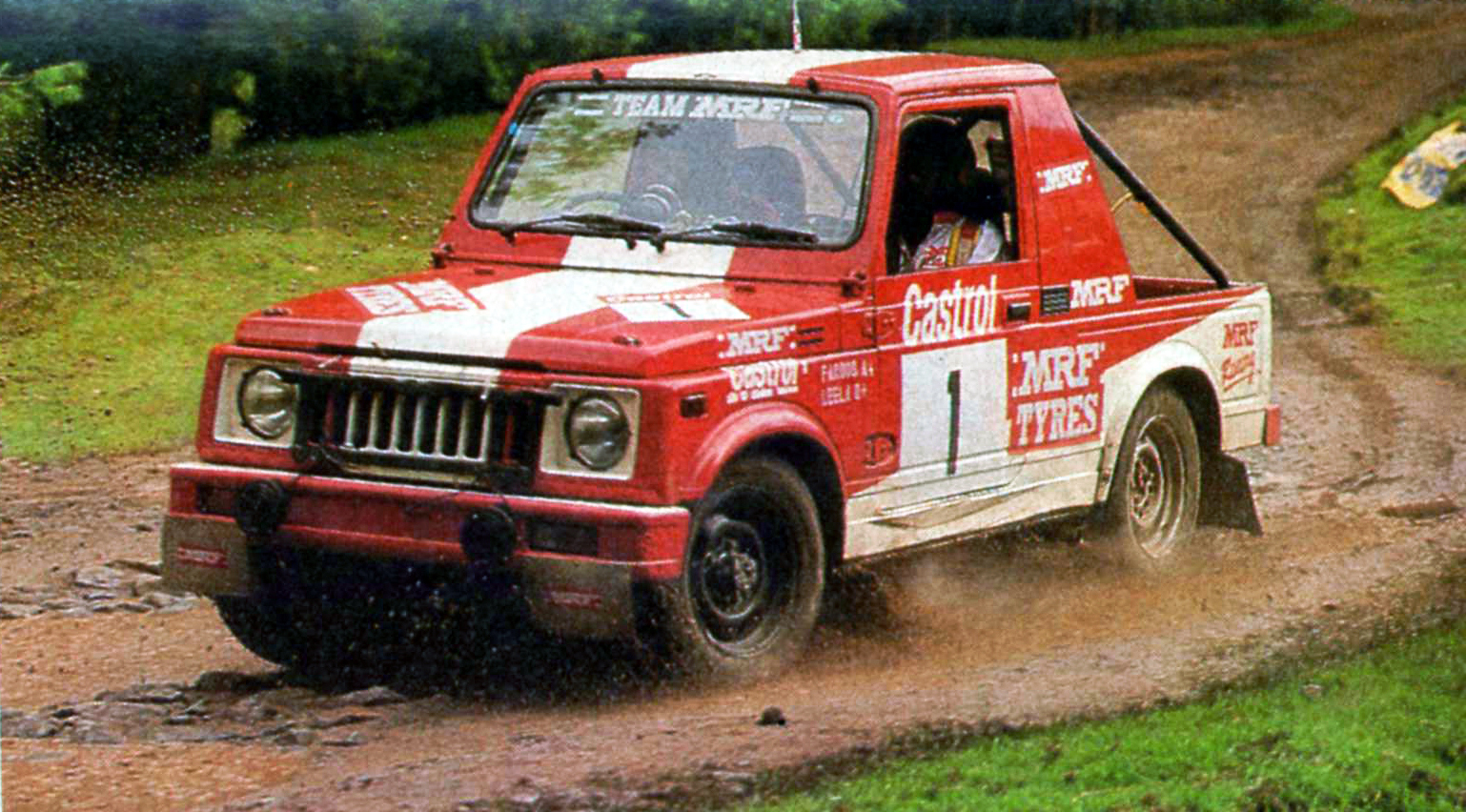
N. Leelakrishnan and co-driver Farooq Ahmed in a Group A(II) IND Maruti Gypsy during the 1993 Castrol South India Rally

For 1989, N.Leelakrishnan quit Super Speeds team as tuner and joined MRF Racing with a deal to set up his own rally team for MRF racing, while another unit of MRF Rally team was set up by J. Anand, who would also tune and prepare the Rally Car for Leela's rallying rival Farad Bathena. Leela's first championship title came in 1990 and continued till 1993, winning 4 consecutive titles with the former two-time champion Farad Bathena as runner-up.

From 1994 to 1997, JK Tyres in partnership with S. Karivardhan set up the JK Rally team and with Hari Singh as their principal driver won four consecutive titles. During these years FMSCI outlawed the then highly modified Group II (A) IND category due to high speeds and cost budgets and reverted to Group (A) IND category. Also till then both MRF and JK Tyres were running on Tuned Electronic Fuel Injection, which had earlier replaced the multiple Webber and SU carburetors, when EFI were not available in any of the vehicles manufactured in India at that time.

With the introduction of Group (A) IND in 1996, most teams switched from Maruti Gypsy's to Maruti Esteem. In 1995 V. R. Naren Kumar joined Leela's unit of MRF Rally team. Leelakrishnan won his fifth title in 1998 in a Group A Maruti Esteem and won his sixth and last title in 2001 in a Group A Honda City 1.5 litre V-TEC. During the MRF years Leela also won the tuners trophy 11 times when his Rally tuned cars won 4 titles for V. R. Naren Kumar and Vikram Mathias, and himself winning the title 6 times.

=== JK Rallying years ===
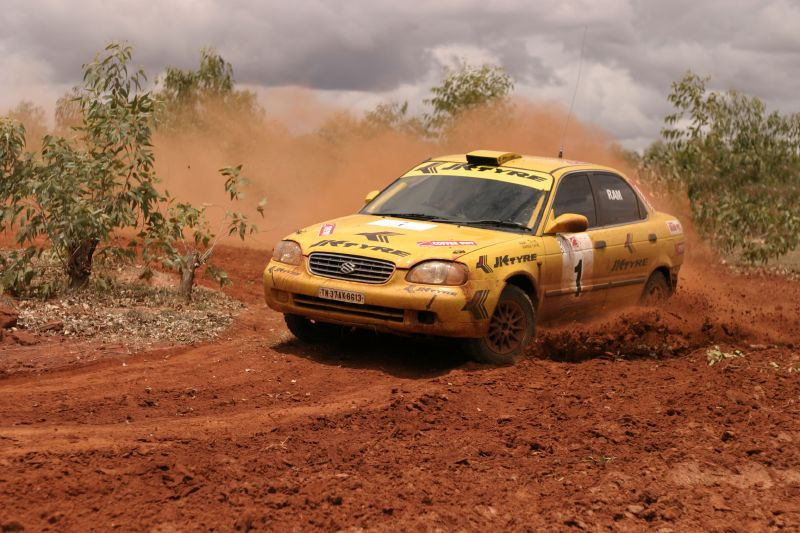
Naren Kumar and Ramkumar in a Group A Maruti Baleno Rally Car tuned by N. Leelakrishnan in Mysore Safari Rally in 2005.

For the 2005 season Leelakrishnan and his outfit quit MRF Rallying to help restart JK Rally team which had earlier quit in 2000 and ran the JK Rally team winning 2 more titles for V. R. Naren Kumar in a Group A Maruti Baleno.

== Racing career ==
Though Leelakrishnan is widely associated with Rallying, Leela's motorsport career started with Racing and is also notable for engine and suspension tuning for competition events.

=== Super Speed years ===
Leelakrishnan worked for S. Karivardhan's team Super Speeds in late eighties, tunning Formula Maruti and Formula McDowell 1000 two seater racing cars.

=== MRF Track Racing ===
During his MRF years, apart from his successes in Rallying events, Leela won a few races in McDowell 1000 races in the All India Grand Prix at Sholavaram and also won the Formula 3 title in 1992 in a Dallara Mugen Honda with stiff competition from J. Anand, R. Gopinath and Akbar Ibrahim who were all one time title winners.

=== JK Track Racing ===
With the introduction of Formula Rolon to the JK National Racing Championship series in 2006, Leela partnered with Vicky Chandok's WSRF racing team, now listed as "Team WSRF with Leela" to help win the first Formula Rolon title for Gaurav Gill. Leelakrishnan continued his race car setup and tuning activities for Formula LGB as well as Formula LGB Hyundai.

== Red Rooster Racing ==
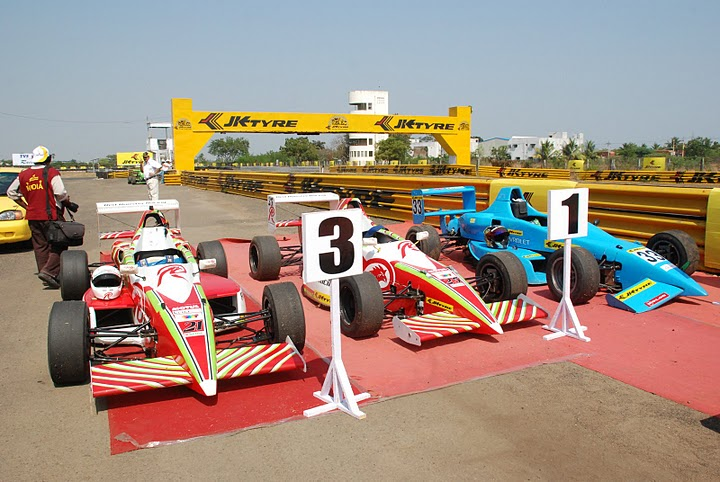
Leela's tuning enabled Red Rooster secured a One and Three Podium Positions for Formula Rolons in 2009

In 2007 Leela's outfit merged with the newly created Red Rooster Racing in Bangalore by Dinesh Reddy. Leelakrishan and his team of engineers and crew relocated from Coimbatore to Bangalore, and with help win two more INRC titles for Vikram Mathias in 2008 and V. R. Naren Kumar in 2010 and one Championship title in Formula Rolon for Gaurav Dalal in 2008. In 2010 Red Rooster Racing pulled out from all form of motor racing (citing lack of sponsorship) and focused on tuning production cars and performance kit development. Currently they have partnered with Toyota Racing Development in India for Toyotas Motorsport activities.
