= Maruti Suzuki Gypsy =

Car model

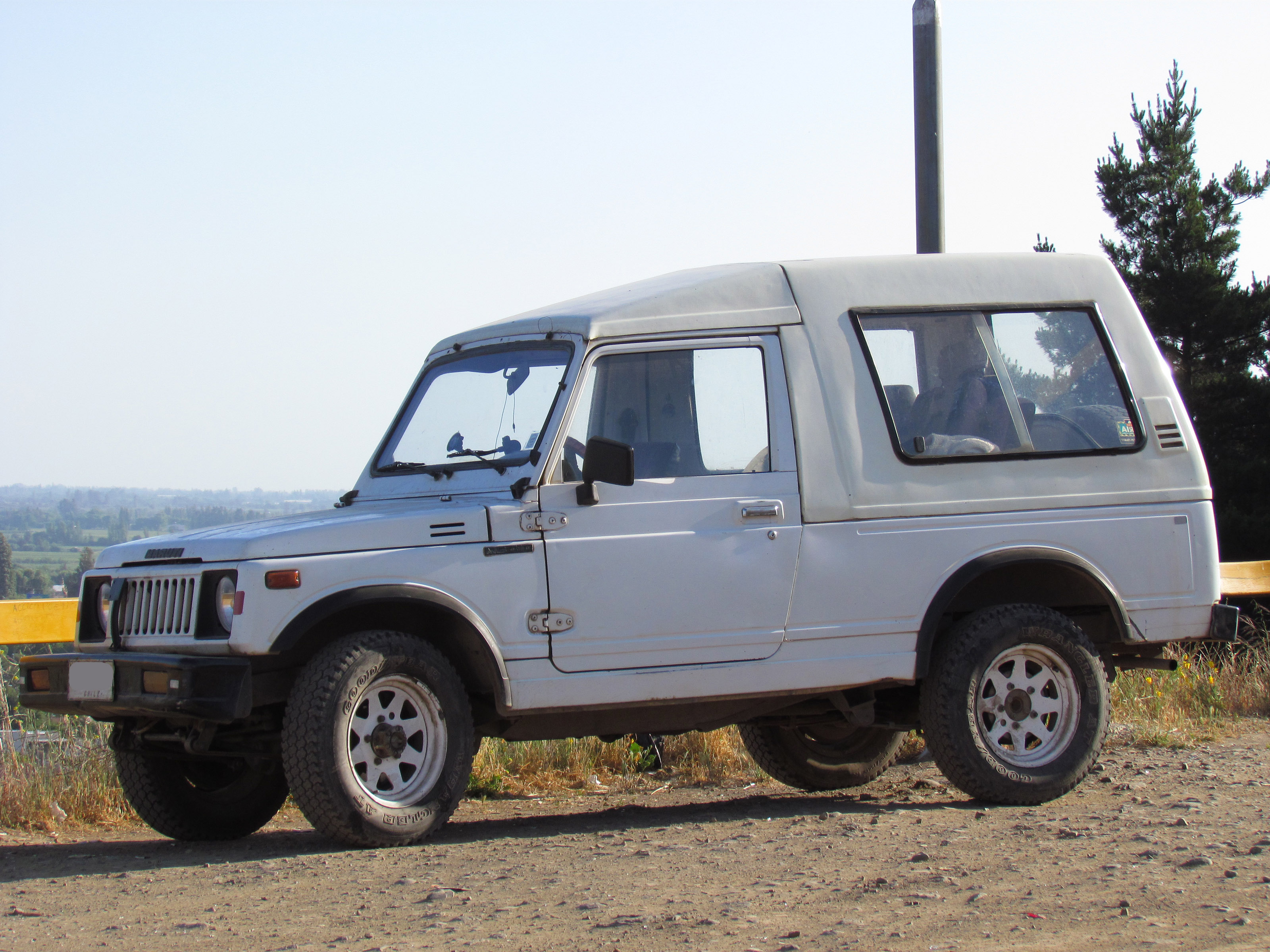
- Maruti Suzuki Gypsy in hard top version

Overview
- Manufacturer: Maruti Suzuki
- Also called: Suzuki Farm Worker; Maruti Suzuki Gypsy King
- Production: 1985 – 2018

Body and chassis
- Class: Off-road mini SUV
- Body style: 2-door convertible soft top; 2-door wagon hard top; 2-door ambulance hard top
- Layout: Front-engine, four-wheel-drive
- Related: Suzuki Jimny; Suzuki Vitara

Powertrain
- Engine: Petrol Inline-4: 1.0L F10A 8-valve Carbureted; 1.3L G13BA 8-valve Carbureted; 1.3L G13BB 16-valve MPFI
- Transmission: 4-speed Manual (1990-1998); 5-speed Manual (King)

Dimensions
- Wheelbase: 2,375 mm (93.5 in)
- Length: 4,010 mm (157.9 in)
- Width: 1,540 mm (60.6 in)
- Height: 1,875 mm (73.8 in) Soft top; 1,845 mm (72.6 in) Hard top
- Curb weight: 985 kg (2,172 lb) Soft top; 1,049 kg (2,313 lb) Hard top

Chronology
- Successor: Suzuki Jimny 4th Gen

The Maruti Suzuki Gypsy is a four-wheel-drive vehicle based on the long wheelbase Suzuki Jimny SJ40/410 series. It was built at Maruti Suzuki's Gurgaon plant. It was primarily built as an off-road vehicle with selectable 4WD. It was extremely popular with the Indian Armed Forces and the law enforcement in India. Official production came to an end in 2018 due to stringent emissions and safety standards. However, Maruti Suzuki has not dismantled the production line and is still producing the Gypsy in batches specifically for the Indian Armed Forces, providing spares and service owing to the significant number of vehicles still in service within the Armed Forces and Law Enforcement.

== History ==
Maruti Gypsy was introduced in the Indian market in December 1985 with the 970 cc F10A Suzuki engine and while sales were never very high it became very popular with law enforcement. It was codenamed MG410, which stood for "Maruti Gypsy 4-cylinder 1.0-litre engine". Initially, it was only available as a soft-top; but a bolt on hardtop was later introduced to the public after the aftermarket hardtops became popular. It instantly replaced Premier Padmini as the quintessential Indian rally car due to its performance, reliability, tunability and the go-anywhere capability. The carburetted F10A engine made 45 bhp (34 kW; 46 PS) and was mated to a four-speed gearbox. The 4WD transfer case had two speeds. It had a freewheeling mechanism on the front axles made by Aisin to unlock the front axles from the hub when 4WD is not used; It reduced rolling resistance, thereby improving fuel efficiency. However, many owners of the Gypsy who constantly complained about the poor fuel consumption never knew about this novel feature.

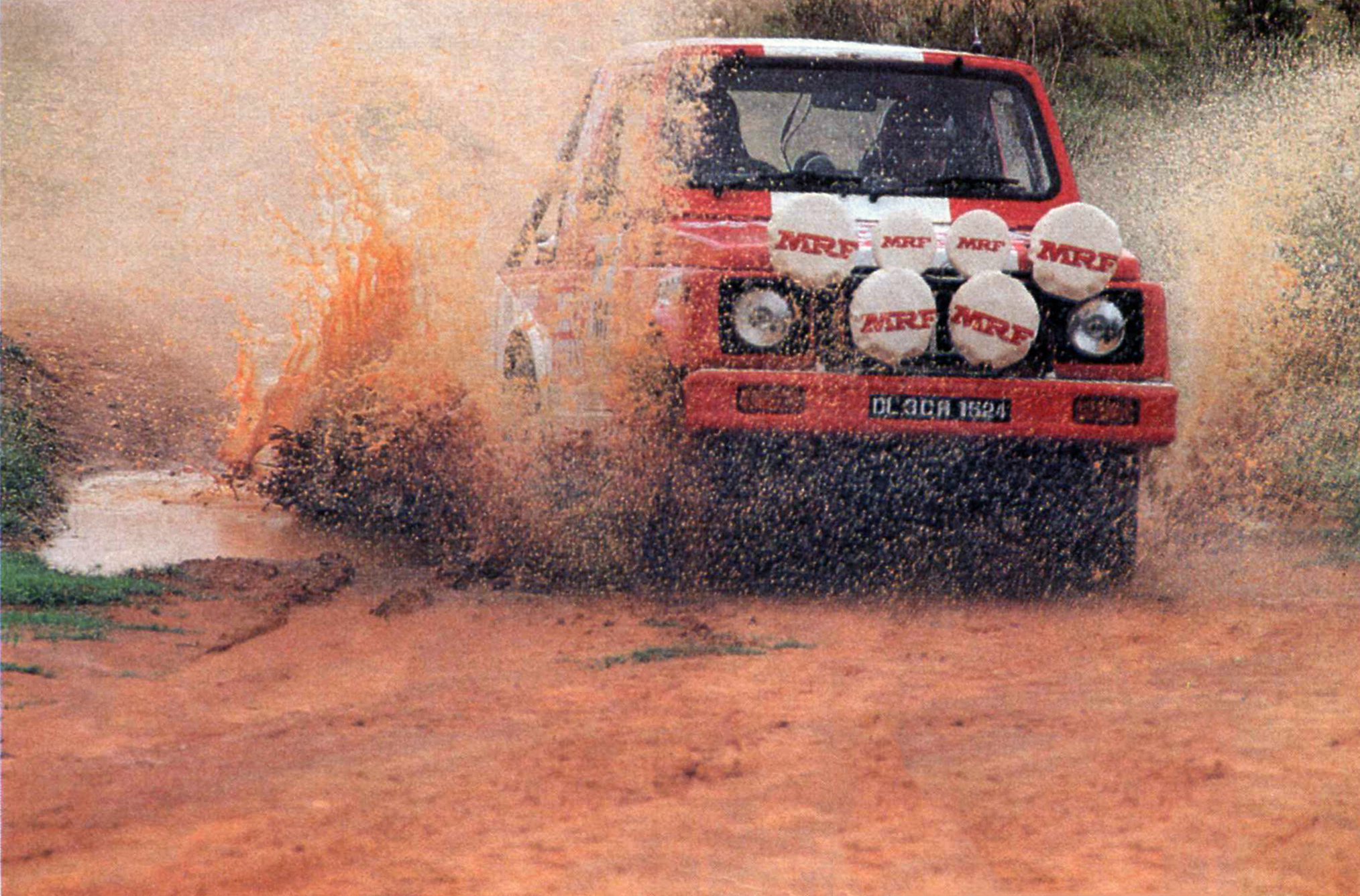
Six times INRC rally champion N. Leelakrishnan in a rally modified Maruti Gypsy in 1993

The two major complaints of the vehicle in the civilian market were poor fuel consumption and poor ride quality especially in the rear seats. The suspension was indeed harsh with live axles and leaf springs all around. It features almost no creature comforts, like power-windows and power-assisted steering.

In July 1993, Maruti Suzuki introduced the "widetrack Gypsy" codenamed "MG410W" replacing the MG410. Both front and rear track of the wheels are increased by 90mm (from 1,210 mm (47.6 in) to 1,300 mm (51.2 in) for front wheels and from 1,220 mm (48.0 in) to 1,310 mm (51.6 in) for rear wheels) and these Gypsys are instantly recognizable by the pronounced painted fender flares. This is to mitigate an international allegation that Suzuki SUVs are very susceptible to rollover. Maruti eliminated the Aisin freewheeling hub on this model since it was sparingly used by MG410 owners. In April 1995, a catalytic converter was fitted to the Gypsys sold in the metro cities to comply with newly introduced emission standards.

In June 1996, Maruti Suzuki added the engine from the Esteem. The new engine was the all-aluminium eight-valve G13BA engine displacing 1.3L and made 60 bhp (45 kW; 61 PS). This engine was carburetted unlike the US market G13BA engine. It was mated to a new five-speed gearbox. It was codenamed "MG413W" and called the "Gypsy King". The F10A-engined 4-speed MG410W continued in production as a base model until 2000. The visual differences of the Gypsy King compared to the MG410W are the pronounced bulge on the hood and a completely different grille design with horizontal slats à la the 1.3L Suzuki Jimny/Samurai JA51. Front seats received head restraints and fabric upholstery.

In March 2000, Maruti Suzuki introduced the 16-Valve MPFI G13BB engine and power was increased to 80 bhp (60 kW; 81 PS). The MPFI Gypsy King received a brake booster as well.

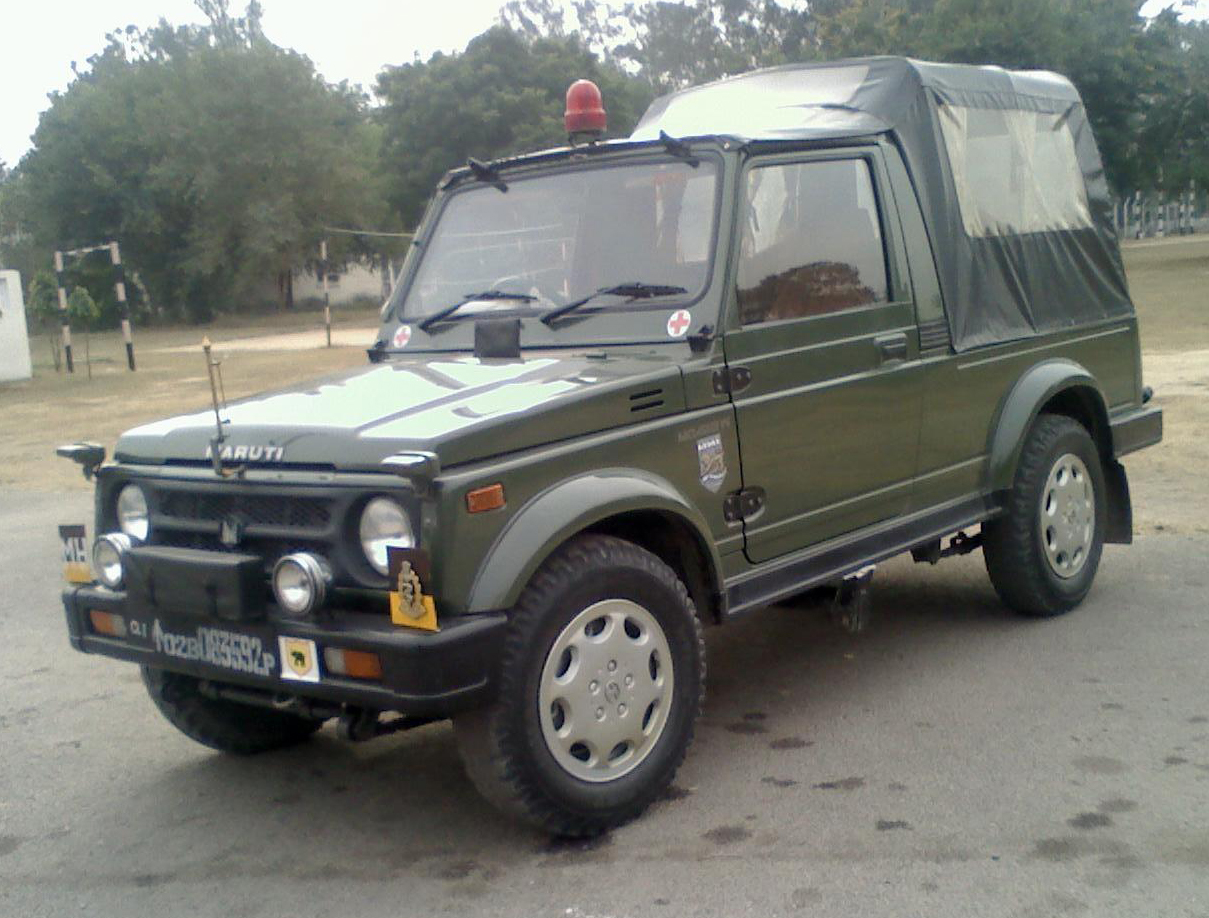
Maruti Suzuki Gypsy, used by Indian Armed Forces

The Gypsy was exported to countries like Chile and Kenya. Within Europe, it is most often found in Malta. In contrast to Suzuki Jimny, the Gypsy is available either with four bucket seats or rear bench seats and a sizable trunk. Currently, the Gypsy is available as a "soft top", "hard top" and as an "ambulance car". In India, it is widely used by the police and military forces. In fact, the MG413W model is now the mainstay of the Indian Army. In civilian use, the Gypsy is a popular choice as a low-cost SUV and is a common sight at rally and autocross events.

As quoted by Autocar India, "There is nothing that can touch a Gypsy off the road, except perhaps an Arjun battle tank. The trouble is that everything else does better on the road - the ride from the archaic leaf springs all round is horribly bumpy and the interiors are utilitarian as well. Gypsy in a loaded condition (>200 kg load) is more comfortable. And available with only two doors, its inconvenient too." The price of a new Maruti Gypsy, if purchased in India, is US$11,250 (6,00,000 INR in 2012). As a 4x4 at this price point, its only Indian competitors are sold by Mahindra Thar and Force Gurkha. As of 2010, the Gypsy is only available against an order with an advance payment and a waiting period of over 3 months. This has led to the creation of a strong market for used Maruti Gypsys.

In addition to the above refurbished Gypsies retrofitted with Nissan or Isuzu diesel engines are also available in some parts of India, although this practice is still limited to unorganised market and there are some issues with RTO registration with retrofitted engines. Production of the Maruti Gypsy for civilians stopped in March 2019. However Gypsy is still in production for defence. Bookings from civilians were taken till December 2018 and were delivered by March 2019.

=== New Zealand ===
In 2013 Suzuki New Zealand introduced the Gypsy King into New Zealand badged as the Suzuki Farm Worker 4x4. Although sold as a Suzuki, with Suzuki script badges on the bonnet and tailgate, the Maruti Suzuki logo badge can clearly be seen in the centre of the radiator grille. The vehicle is powered by the G13BB 1.3-litre 16-valve engine producing 80 bhp (60 kW) at 6000 rpm and 103 N⋅m (76 lb⋅ft) of torque at 4500 rpm, and mated to a five-speed all synchromesh gearbox and a high/low two-wheel-drive/4 wd transfer box. The Farm Worker is available in four slightly differing styles all based on the lwb softtop platform with a maximum payload of 500 kg: two having a rear window and fibreglass bulkhead, and two having canvas roofs with foldable front windscreens. No hardtop versions are available. As its name suggests, the Farm Worker is intended for farm work only and is not able to be road registered, and therefore not able to be driven on public roads, due to the vehicle not meeting current New Zealand crash protection regulations.

Suzuki New Zealand stopped listing the Farm Worker on their website in August 2016.

== Technical data ==
Maruti Gypsy	MG410	MG410W	MG413W (8V)	MG413W (16V)
	(1986–1993)	(1991–1999)	(1996–2000)	(2000–2020)
Engine family:	Suzuki F Engine	Suzuki F Engine	Suzuki G Engine	Suzuki G Engine
Engine code:	F10A	F10A	G13BA	G13BB
Displacement:	970 cc	970 cc	1298 cc	1298 cc
Valve Train	SOHC 8-Valve	SOHC 8-Valve	SOHC 8-Valve	SOHC 16-Valve

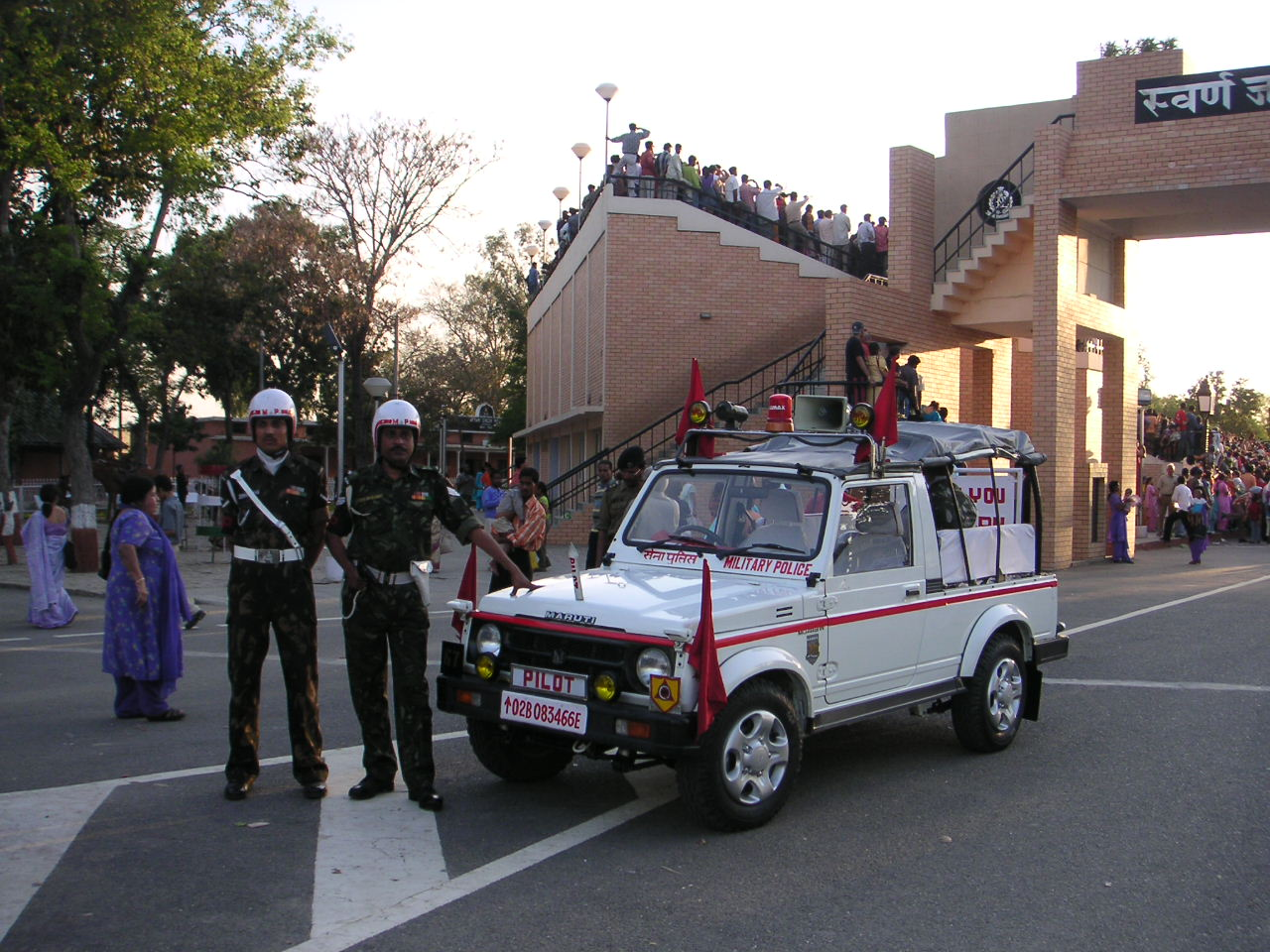
India's Corps of Military Police(India) personnel patrolling the Attari border crossing in the Punjab in a Gypsy.

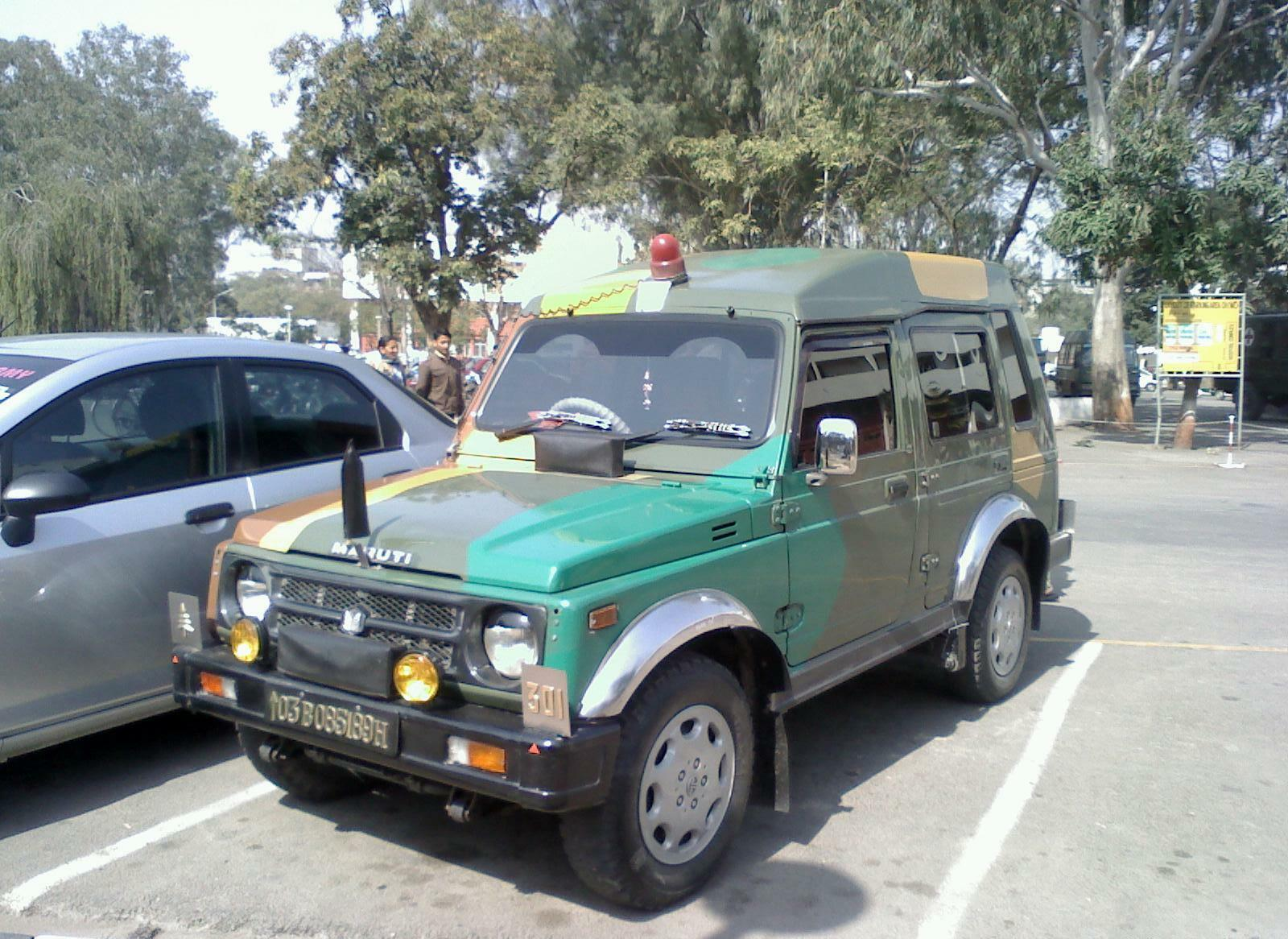
Indian Army Maruti Suzuki Gypsy King in 5 door VIP version

Maruti Suzuki MG413W "Gypsy King"

Dimensions

- Front track 1,300 mm (51.2 in)
- Rear track 1,310 mm (51.6 in)
- Kerb weight 985 kg/1, 040 kg*
- Gross vehicle weight 1585 kg/1,620 kg*

Engine

- Type G13BB MPFI 16-valve gasoline
- Cylinders 4
- Displacement 1298 cc
- Maximum power 80 bhp (60 kW; 81 PS) @6000 rpm
- Maximum torque 103 N⋅m (76 lb⋅ft) @ 4500 rpm
- Transmission type Five forward (all synchromesh), one reverse
- Transfer gearbox Two-speed
- Type constant mesh
- Transfer gear ratio High : 1.409; Low : 2.268
- Suspension Front and rear leaf springs with double action dampers

Brakes with booster

- Front Disc 250 mm
- Rear Drum 220 mm
- Tyres F78-15-4 PR 205/70R15

Capacities

- Fuel tank 40 L (11 US gal; 9 imp gal)
- Engine oil 4 L (1.1 US gal; 0.9 imp gal)
