= Indian National Rally Championship =

India's top rallying series

- INRC
- Category: National Rally Championship
- Country: India
- Inaugural season: 1988
- Tyre suppliers: JK Tyres, MRF, Yokohama, Birla Tyres
- Drivers' champion: (India) Karna Kadur (2024)
- Co-Drivers' champion: (India) Musa Sherif (2024)
- Official website: www.bluebandsports.com

Indian National Rally Championship (INRC) is a rallying National Championship in different classes with a series of rounds, organised by the Federation of Motor Sports Clubs of India (FMSCI), which is the Governing Body or ASN of India recognised by FIA culminating with National Champion Driver and Co-Driver. The driver and co-drivers's championship are based on a point system. The championship first received its National Championship title status in 1988. Karna Kadur and co-driver Musa Sherif became the 2024 National champions after winning the Overall title at Tumakuru on 15 December 2024. He drives for Team Arka Motorsports in a Volkswagen Polo R2 (FIA Rally4). The 2024 National Championship began in Chennai from 15 March 2024 with the South India Rally (SIR) which is also a round of the APRC Asia Cup.

== Rally formats ==
Prior to the inception of INRC, Motor Rally in India was run on TSD (Time, Speed, and Distance) format. During 70's and 80's the TSD events ran into several states with distances covering several days and distances exceeded over 1000 miles.

=== TSD endurance format ===
Up till 1988, the TSD format was modeled on endurance format with Popular Rally starting in Cochin would have a re-group in Coimbatore or Ooty, covering a few days and close to 1000 km. Same for South India Rally (Chennai), K1000 or Karnataka 1000 (Bangalore), Scissors Action Rally (Coimbatore) all had routes cris-crossing into each other cities and covered two or more states. Overnight re-grouping was done at different locations and a fresh starting order was issued in a re-group start. Routes were mostly dirt and off-road conditions as well as ghat sections.

=== Stage rally ===
Since 1988, FMSCI introduced the Stage rally format for the INRC which was then known as the FMSCI Indian Rally Drivers Championship (FIRDC), which usually covered between 300 and 400 km (190 and 250 mi) and Rallies were conducted in low traffic areas in country side. Some events were Day Rallies; others ran in Night only while some had a mix of Day and Night.

Over a period, the Stage Distance became shorter and overall Rally was conducted in a few closed stages, closed to traffic. Since 2000 under MAI, the Rally ran as per FIA regulations in a format of a one Day Recce, Two Day Rally and the results were announced by the end of the day. Also stage Marshall Training was conducted by hiring FIA nominated personals by both FMSCI and MAI. Spectator and competitor safety became prime factor in event management. Also during the MAI years night rallies were stopped as well as Two Wheeler rallying.

=== Event equipments and communication ===
Computers were used since 1988 rallies for tabulating penalty points, while HAM radio was the principal form of communication by Rally Headquarters between Time Controls and Marshalls while the teams operated between the drivers and their crews in a different frequency as allotted by the INRC and Ham Clubs. By 2001, standardized electronic Timing equipments were used by all clubs. Also INRC awarded trophies to the clubs for safety and administration, based on a point system audit by FIA and MAI observers. At times a bad event management attracted termination of hosting the INRC round the following year.

== Teams ==
The ITC sponsored Scissors Action Rally Team, based out of Coimbatore having strong links to the Coimbatore Auto Sports Club, was the first in establishing a professional rally team in late 80's, eventually winning the inaugural rally in the INRC year 1988. This team had several top title contenders like L. Gopalakrishnan, DPF Krishnakumar and the two were leading the championship points at times during the 88 and 89 seasons.

MRF Tyres were one of the major sponsors for some of the leading drivers and two wheelers riders since early 80's, fielding some of the leading as well as new talents in both Four Wheelers and Two Wheelers. Though the team concept was non-existent then, MRF sponsored competitors had their own tuners. It was not until 1989 J. Anand and a year later N. Leelakrishnan would establish the MRF rally units. The Cochin-based Popular Automobiles had the Popular Rally Team and Kirloskar, Veedol Oil and Raymonds used to sponsor drivers from Maharashtra. There were other local Teams like Team Kadur too. Most of these those teams were competing or sponsoring drivers since early eighties. MRF Tyres would also eventually establish a Motorsport division with Anthony Rodricks as its head.

After the introduction of INRC championship title format, several new teams entered into Rallying. The notable entry was by JK Tyres, who in 1992 signed an agreement with S. Karivardhan for Motor Rallying as well as Racing activities. JK Motorsports since then managed by Sanjay Sharma had been in Motor Rallying and Track racing in a major way by sponsoring drivers to international competitions. In 1993 another new team emerged from Irinjalakuda, named Team Paarel which also won the 1993 Karnataka-1000 driven by Vinil Varghese. In 1995 Chetinnad Cements sponsored Chettinad Motorsports started competing in the stock Group N category. So did other Teams like Kari Sports, Kumci Sports etc.

There were other private entrants who mostly filled the rest half of the field.

The MRF rally team continued to flourish under the leadership of Antony Rodrigues and Soman Joseph and several of their drivers set many records during the period. The main drivers and navigators where; Naren Kumar/D Ram Kumar, Karandip Singh/Jaidas Menon, Arjun Balu/Kumar ramswami, Lohit Urs/Chandramouli. Meanwhile, Gaurav Gill of JK tyres joined MRF Tyres co-navigated by Musa Sherif and won many titles.

In recent years, Red Rooster Racing, a new Team based out of Bangalore entered the INRC in 2008 with N. Leelakrishnan as their Technical Director and went on to win the Championship in their debut year. This triggered a fierce battle between Red Rooster Racing and Team MRF Tyres for the next two years and was the highlight of the INRC in recent years. Red Rooster Racing however closed down at the end of 2010 due to financial difficulties but by then, they had won the championship 2 out of the 3 years they entered the INRC.

Two of the Team Drivers, Amittrajit Ghosh & Karna Kadur left to be part of another new outfit, Team RRPM with support from MRF Tyres and went on to win the Group N championship in 2011 and the INRC in 2012 & 2013.

In 2012, another new Team called Slideways Industries joined the INRC with the support of VW and JK Tyres with drivers like Karamjit Singh and Vikram Mathias.

In 2016, Team Karna Kadur (Driver) and Nikhil Pai (Co-driver) became the INRC Champions.

In 2017 and 2018, Gaurav Gill (Driver) and Musa Sherif (Co-driver) of Team Mahindra Adventure won back-to-back INRC Championships.

In 2019, brothers Chetan Shivram (Driver) and Dilip Sharan (Co-driver) from Team Akshara won the INRC championship.

== Four wheelers ==
Ambassadors and Premier Padminis dominated the rallying scene till early '80s. The Group A(II) IND Premier Padminis continued in the INRC years till late '90s. Sipani Dolphins was a preferred choice for Vicky Chandhok and others who were dominant between 85 and 88 years. Hindustan Contessa Classic and Premier 118NE made brief appearances of which the later was driven by K. D. Madan and Kamlesh Patel, winning the 1987 Karnataka K-1000 Rally.

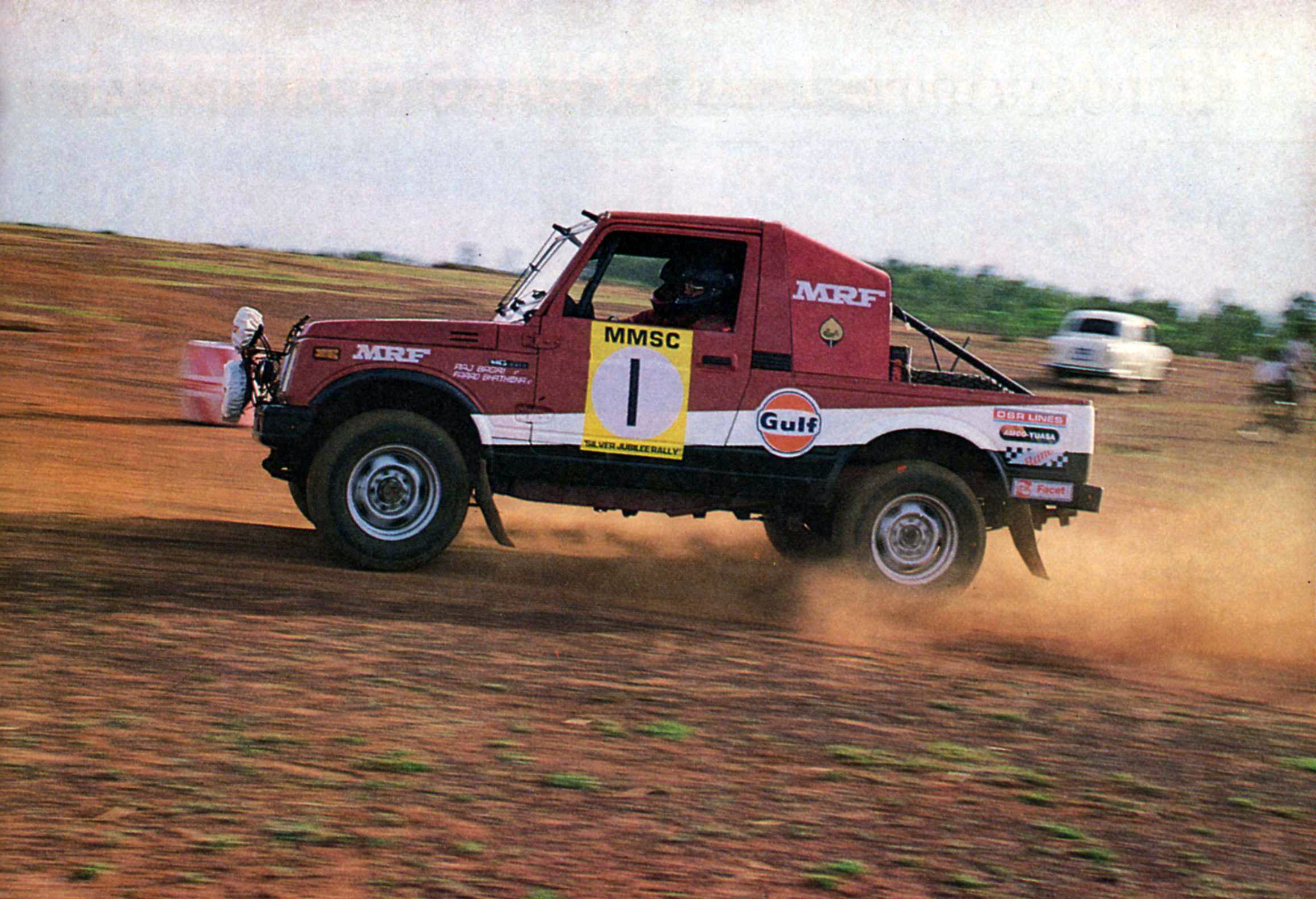
Farad Bathena and Raj Bagri in MRF Maruti Gypsy in 1989 South India Rally

Maruti 800 also had a significant presence as they were already competing in the Sholavaram 800CC class. The INRC's inaugural rally in 1988, Scissors Master Action Rally in Coimbatore was won by L. Gopalakrishnan and Mahendran, driving a Group A(II)IND Maruti 800 for the Scissors Action Rally Team.

=== Maruti Gypsy era ===
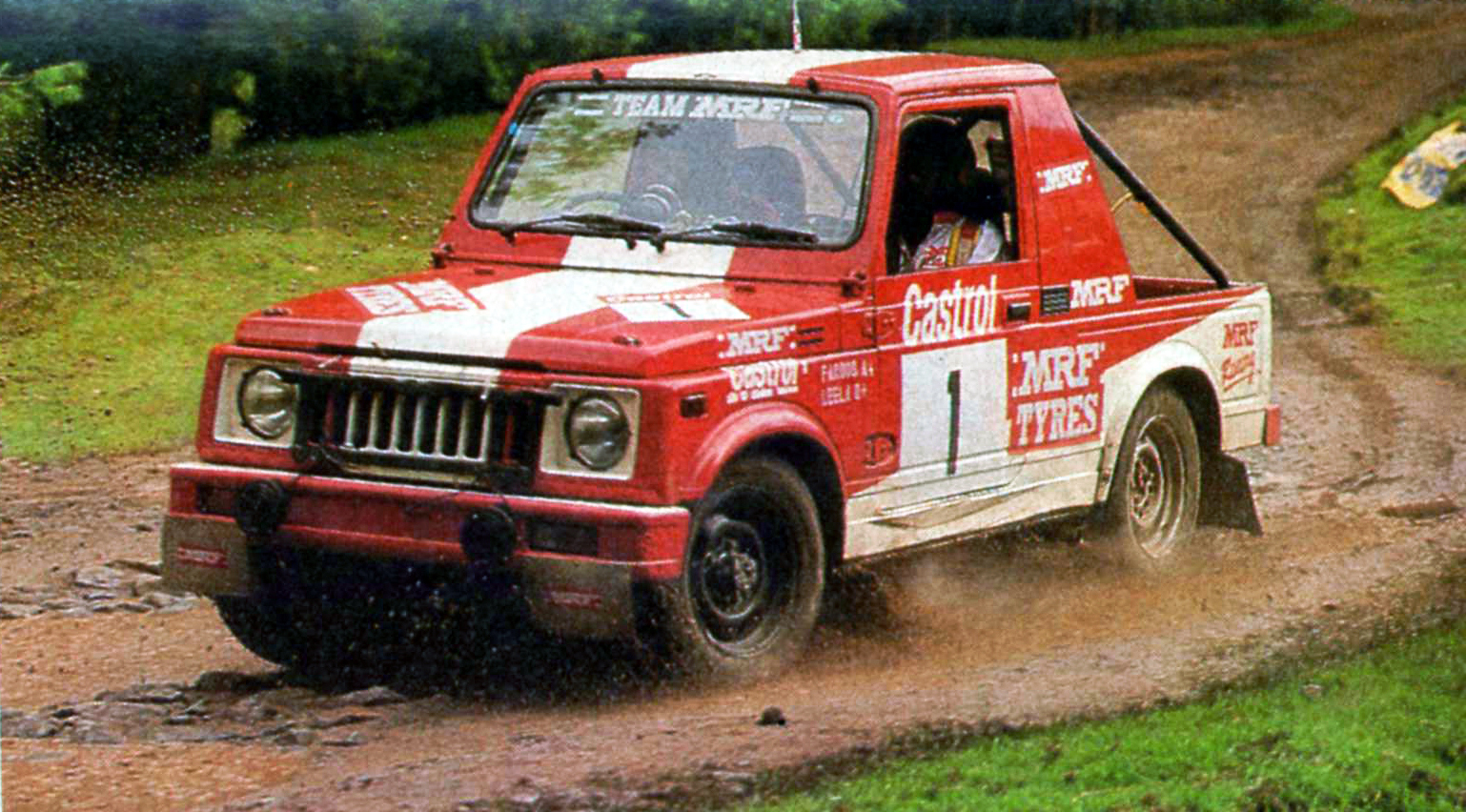
N. Leelakrishnan and Farooq Ahmed in a Group A(II) IND Maruti Gypsy during the 1993 Castrol South India Rally

Post INRC, most top drivers switched to the Maruti Gypsy for its off-road and Four-wheel drive capabilities. The highly modified Group A (II) IND category allowed tuners the flexibility to choose between a wide range of cam shafts, tuned exhausts and heavily modified cylinder heads. Till 1992, MRF was the principal choice of tyres for most Maruti Gypsys and twin Weber carburetors were the preferred choice for the fully modified class. For the 1994 season S. Karivardhan opted for computer programmable Electronic Fuel Injection for Hari Singh's Team JK Gypsy and they were dominant during that period, prompting N. Leelakrishnan to follow suit in EFI systems for his Rally cars. Alarmed at the high budgets and top speeds of the top runners, FMSCI for 1996 season finally outlawed the Group A (II) IND category and reverted to Group A (I) IND category which restricted engine modifications and the regular stock Group N category. The loud intake and screaming exhaust note with crackling backfire were missed by many rally fans.

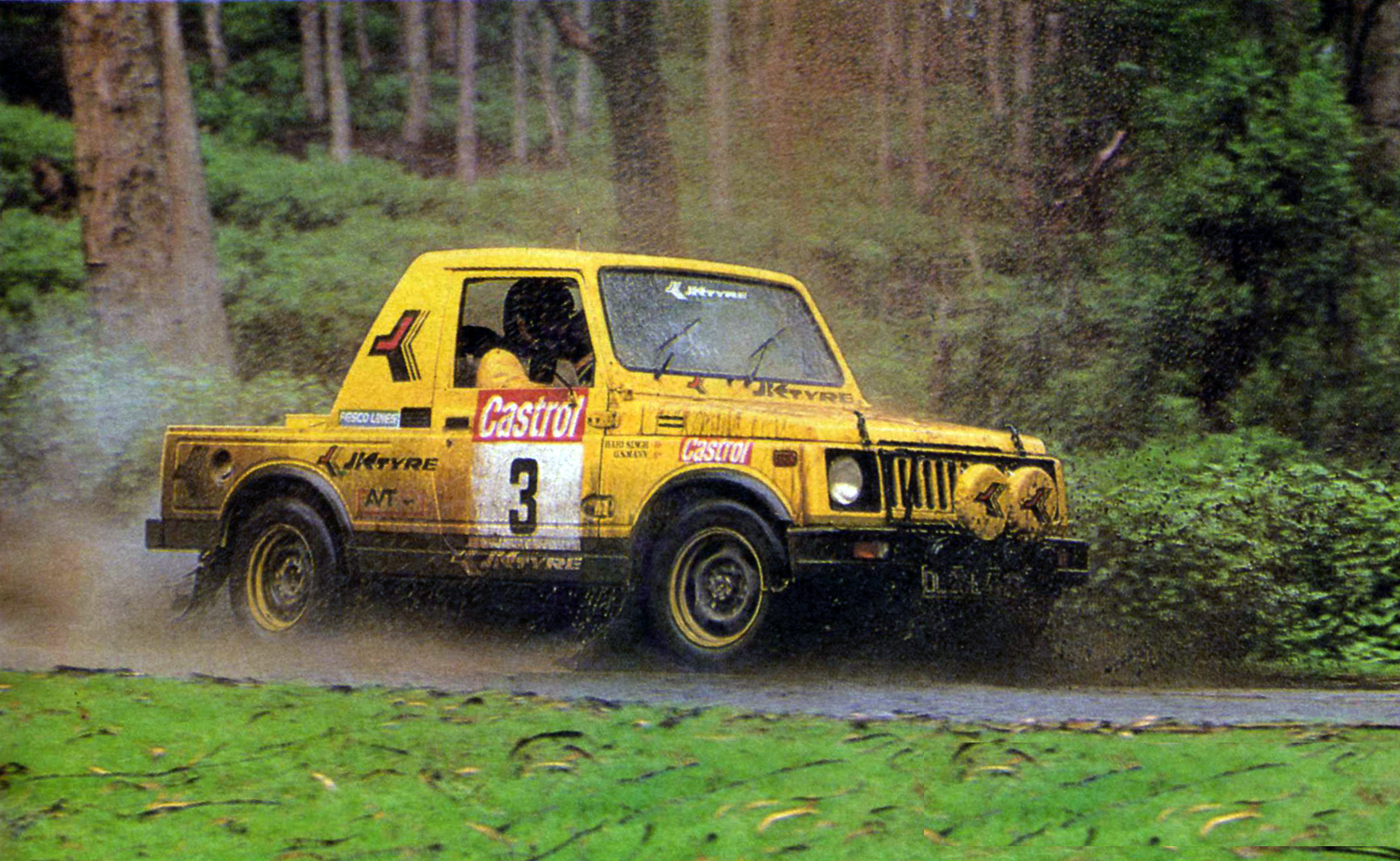
Hari Singh in a Team JK Tyres Maruti Gypsy in the 1993 Castrol South India Rally in Kodaikanal stages.))

=== Maruti Esteem era ===
In 1996 Maruti Esteem, became the preferred choice for all top teams and was confined to Group A (I) IND category. The Maruti Esteem also had a high power weight ratio compared to other cars in India. The Rally terrain was split in two formats, Dirt or Tarmac for the entire event. Events like K-1000, South India Rally and Coimbatore rallies mostly ran in Dirt format, while Popular Rally and Rally D’ Endurance opted for tarmac rallies. Hence the choice of tyres and suspension setup for the saloon cars were done well before the rally. Also with restricted engine power and more Tarmac rallies for saloon cars meant suspension tuning for handling by tuners became the deciding factor for a cars performance.

=== Maruti Baleno and Honda City era ===
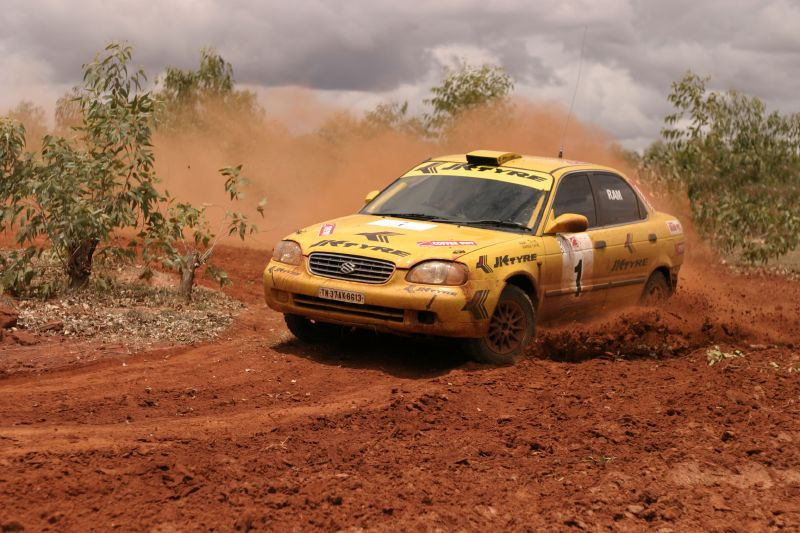
Naren Kumar and Ramkumar in a Group N Maruti Baleno Rally Car in Mysore Safari Rally in 2005.

By 2000, with the launch of Honda City VTEC and Maruti Balenos Team JK and MRF opted for these two cars of which the less powerful Maruti Baleno's were given for the mid-field contenders. Still Maruti Esteem remained the favorite among the privateers and novices in the group N category. Also Honda City cars were more reliable and suspension tuning became the deciding factor for vehicle performance. A few mid-runners opted for the new 16 Valve MPFI Maruti Esteem's for its low running costs.

==== Rally Star Cup ====
MAI launched a new "Rally Star Cup" for novices as a "Pay and Drive" package deal with service as per MAI's arrangement with a few teams. The cars were the older carburrated Maruti Esteems. This new programme was to encourage new and young drivers into rallying without the burden of spending huge money for cars and service crew.

=== Mitsubishi Cedia ===
With the introduction of the much powerful Group N & N+ Mitsubishi Cedia with a power over 230 BHP in Group N+ trim, most top runners switched to it.

The Maruti Gypsy again made appearances in INRC events as a new Gypsy class was created by FMSCI in 2008.

The FMSCI has in the recent past since 2012 made quite a few changes to the INRC. It stopped the highly modified Group N+ category and followed the FIA Group N regulations for all its classes. The Junior Indian National Rally Championship (JINRC) to promote young talent was also introduced thereby stopping the Rally Star Cup.

The other class that it created is the Indian Rally Championship which is open to foreign nationals as well as Indians in imported cars conforming to the FIA Group N category. With this, Indian rally fans have been able to see cars like the Mitsubishi Evo X and Subaru Impreza on Indian rally stages.

In 2012, the Gypsy class was stopped and in 2013, the FMSCI created a SUV class running as per the FIA T1 & T2 regulations. The Mahindra XUV 500 has come out to be the vehicle to beat in this class. It has won the National Championship title first in 2014 with Gaurav Gill and co-driver Musa Sherif winning the Nationals and the duo went on to win in a Mahindra Vehicle in 2017, 2018 and 2020.

== FMSCI years ==
FMSCI was the governing body from 1988 till 1999. During this period Two Wheelers were also included in the Championship. It was then known as FIRDC Championship and was sponsored by Castrol. The international sports governing body FIA reverted the governing and sanctioning rights to FMSCI in October 2008, and since 2009 season INRC is governed by FMSCI.

== MAI years ==
Between the years 2000 and 2008 MAI (Motorsports Authority Of India) was approved by FIA to administer and govern the National Championship. In 2008, the sanctioning and governing authority was reverted to FMSCI.

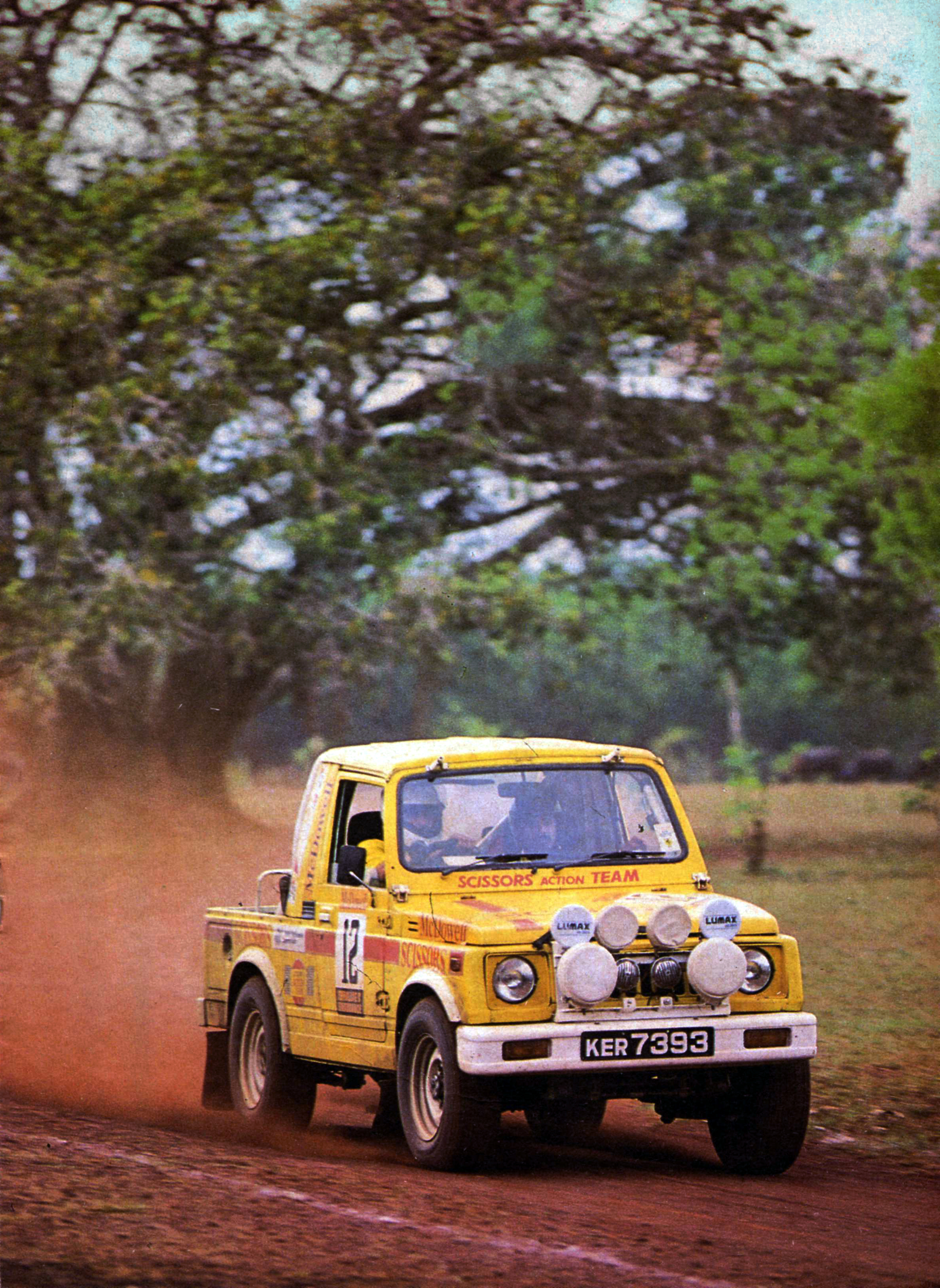
ITC's Scissors Action Team, based in Coimbatore won the maiden Rally in 1988. Here GVL Gopal, at 1991 RallyD'Endurance

== Champions ==
Season	Driver	Co-Driver	Team	Car	Tuner	Governing body
1988	(India) Farad Bathena	Raj Bagri	Team MRF	Maruti Gypsy Group II (A)* (IND)	Mohinder Lalwani	FMSCI
1989	(India) Farad Bathena	Raj Bagri	Team MRF	Maruti Gypsy Group II (A)* (IND)	J.Anand	FMSCI
1990	(India) N. Leelakrishnan	C V Jaykumar	Team MRF	Maruti Gypsy Group II (A)* (IND)	N. Leelakrishnan	FMSCI
1991	(India) N. Leelakrishnan	N Mahindran	Team MRF	Maruti Gypsy Group II (A)* (IND)	N. Leelakrishnan	FMSCI
1992	(India) N. Leelakrishnan *	N Mahindran	Team MRF	Maruti Gypsy Group II (A)* (IND)	N. Leelakrishnan	FMSCI
1993	(India) N. Leelakrishnan	N Mahindran	Team MRF	Maruti Gypsy Group II (A)** (IND)	N. Leelakrishnan	FMSCI
1994	(India) Hari Singh	Gurinder Singh Mann	JK Rally Team	Maruti Gypsy Group A-1-A (IND)	S.Karivardhan	FMSCI
1995	(India) Hari Singh	Gurinder Singh Mann	JK Rally Team	Maruti Gypsy Group A-1-A (IND)	S.Karivardhan	FMSCI
1996	(India) Hari Singh	Gurinder Singh Mann	JK Rally Team	Maruti Esteem Group A-1-A (IND)	PNR Satish	FMSCI
1997	(India) Hari Singh	Gurinder Singh Mann	JK Rally Team	Maruti Esteem Group A-1-A (IND)	WSRF	FMSCI
1998	(India) N. Leelakrishnan	Farooq Ahmed	Team MRF	Maruti Esteem Group A-1-A (IND)	N. Leelakrishnan	FMSCI
1999	(India) V. R. Naren Kumar	Farooq Ahmed	Team MRF	Maruti Esteem Group A	N. Leelakrishnan	FMSCI
2000	(India) V. R. Naren Kumar	D Ram Kumar	Team MRF	Maruti Baleno Group A	N. Leelakrishnan	MAI
2001	(India) N. Leelakrishnan	Farooq Ahmed	Team MRF	Honda City Group A	N. Leelakrishnan	MAI
2002	(India) V. R. Naren Kumar	D Ram Kumar	Team MRF	Honda City Group A	N. Leelakrishnan	MAI
2003	(India) V. R. Naren Kumar	D Ram Kumar	Team MRF	Honda City Group A	N. Leelakrishnan	MAI
2004	(India) Vikram Mathias	Sujith Kumar	Team MRF	Honda City Group A	N. Leelakrishnan	MAI
2005	(India) V. R. Naren Kumar	D Ram Kumar	JK Rally Team	Maruti Baleno Group N	N. Leelakrishnan	MAI
2006	(India) V. R. Naren Kumar	D Ram Kumar	JK Rally Team	Maruti Baleno Group N	N. Leelakrishnan	MAI
2007	(India) Gaurav Gill	Musa Sherif	Team MRF	Mitsubishi Cedia Group N	J.Anand	MAI
2008	(India) Vikram Mathias	PVS Murthy	Red Rooster Racing	Mitsubishi Cedia Group N+	N. Leelakrishnan	MAI
2009	(India) Gaurav Gill	Musa Sherif	Team MRF	Mitsubishi Cedia Group N+	J.Anand	FMSCI
2010	(India) V. R. Naren Kumar	D Ram Kumar	Red Rooster Racing	Mitsubishi Cedia Group N+	N. Leelakrishnan	FMSCI
2011	(India) Gaurav Gill	Musa Sherif	MRF	Mitsubishi Cedia Group N+	J.Anand	FMSCI
2012	(India) Amittrajit Ghosh	Ashwin Naik	RRPM	Mitsubishi Cedia Group N	B.Rajan	FMSCI
2013	(India) Amittrajit Ghosh	Ashwin Naik	RRPM	Mitsubishi Cedia Group N	B.Rajan	FMSCI
2014	(India) Gaurav Gill	Musa Sherif	Mahindra Adventure	XUV 500	N. Leelakrishnan	FMSCI
2015	(India) Lohith V Urs	Srikanth GM	MRU Motor Sport	Mitsubishi Cedia Evo8	Mohamed Rafiq Udaya	FMSCI
2016	(India) Karna Kadur	Nikhil Pai	Team Yokohama India	Volkswagen Polo Group N	N. Leelakrishnan	FMSCI
2017	(India) Gaurav Gill	Musa Sherif	Mahindra Adventure	Mahindra XUV 500	N. Leelakrishnan	FMSCI
2018	(India) Gaurav Gill	Musa Sherif	Mahindra Adventure	Mahindra XUV 500	N. Leelakrishnan	FMSCI
2019	(India) Chetan Shivram	Dilip Sharan	Akshara Racing	Volkswagen Polo	Fazil Khan, FRK Racing	FMSCI
2020	(India) Gaurav Gill	Musa Sherif	JK Tyre Racing	Mahindra XUV 300	N Leelakrishnan	FMSCI
2021	(India) Aditya Thakur	Virender Kashyap	Chettinad Sporting	Volkswagen Polo	R Thiagarajan	FMSCI
2022	(India) Karna Kadur	Nikhil Pai	Arka Motorsports	Volkswagen Polo	N Leelakrishnan	FMSCI
2023	(India) Aroor Arjun Rao	Satish Rajagopal	Mandovi Racing	Maruti Baleno	Mohan, Falcon Motorsports	FMSCI
2024	(India) Karna Kadur	Musa Sherif	Arka Motorsports	Volkswagen Polo	N Leelakrishnan	FMSCI
2025	Dean Mascarenhas	Gagan Karumbaiah	Team Sidvin India (TSI) nRacing	Peugeot 208	PH Sport	FMSCI

Notes * Denotes Vehicle Class Group II (A)IND. This class has unrestricted Vehicle Modifications. Extreme Engine Porting, Multiple Carburetors (Twin SU's or Webber's), etc. This class was outclassed/Banned by the end of 1993 season.
** Denotes Vehicle Class Group II (A)IND. In this year the winners car has Rally tuned Electronic Fuel Injection. As were its rival car.
* 1992 Four Wheeler Title – N. Leela Krishnan and N. Mahindran won the tie beaker and the title was awarded to them against Farad Bathena and Farook Comsariat.

=== Four wheelers drivers ===
- Gaurav Gill – New Delhi – 7 time champion.
- V. R. Naren Kumar – Coimbatore – 7 time champion.
- N. Leelakrishnan – Coimbatore – 6 time champion.
- Hari Singh – Chandigarh – 4 time champion.
- Karna Kadur – Bengaluru – 3 time champion.
- Farad Bathena – Mumbai – 2 time champion.
- Vikram Mathias – Bengaluru/Masinagudi – 2 time champion.
- Amittrajit Ghosh – Kolkata – 2 time champion.
- Lohith V Urs – Mysore – 1 time champion.
- Chetan Shivram – Bengaluru – 1 time champion.
- Aditya Thakur - Solan, Himachal Pradesh - 1 time champion.
- Aroor Arjun Rao - Mangaluru, Karnataka - 1-time champion.
- Dean Mascarenhas - Mangaluru, Karnataka - 1-time champion.

=== Four wheelers Co-drivers ===
- Musa Sherif – Karnataka – 8 time champion.
- Ram Kumar – Coimbatore – 6 time champion.
- Gurinder Singh Mann – Punjab – 4 time champion.
- N. Mahindran – Coimbatore – 3 time champion.
- Farooq Ahmed – Chikmagalur – 3 time champion.
- Raj Bagri – Bombay – 2 time champion.
- Ashwin Naik – Mangalore – 2 time champion.
- Nikhil Pai – Bangalore – 2 time champion.
- Gagan Karumbaiah - Kodagu - 1-time champion.

== See also ==
- Formula Manipal
- Madras Motor Sports Club
- Kari Motor Speedway
- Force India
- Buddh International Circuit
