= Motorsports Association of India =

- Formation: 2000
- Type: Sports federation
- Headquarters: 41/42, Liberty Building, New Marine Lines, Mumbai, India
- Region served: India
- Members: FIA, CIK
- President: Nazir Hoosein
- Website: http://www.mai.co.in/

The Motorsports Association of India (MAI) was the national sporting authority (ASN) of the Fédération Internationale de l'Automobile (FIA) in India for a period between 2000 and 2008. It was the association responsible for the control and promotion of motorsport in India under the International Sporting Code of the FIA for a few years. The current ASN is Federation of Motor Sports Clubs in India (FMSCI). MAI was a rival body formed by Nazir Hoosein.

The MAI was also a member of the Commission Internationale de Karting (CIK), the commission of the FIA that deals with world karting and runs the Indian National Rally Championship (INRC), and other karting events.

As the sole recognised body of the FIA and CIK, the MAI was the only authority permitted to issue FIA licences for all levels of motorsport in India during that period.

The MAI was formed as a rival body to the Federation of Motor Sports Clubs of India, which was also represented at the FIA and regained full control of motorsport after the MAI was disestablished in 2008. In December 2013, FIA removed MAI from its rolls of any membership or association.
