= Nazir Hoosein =

Indian racing driver (died 2019)

Nazir Hoosein (1940 or 1941 – 12 May 2019) was an Indian racing driver and motorsport administrator. He was President of the Motorsports Association of India, Vice President of the FIA for Sport, chief steward of the World Rally Championship, steward for Formula One events, and a member of the World Motor Sport Council.

In 1980, Hoosein founded the Himalayan Rally Association and started the Himalayan Rally, run through the world's highest mountain range in the north of India. He founded the Indian Automotive Racing Club as he was unhappy with the way that motorsport was organised in India, and then helped in the forming of the Federation of Motor Sport Clubs of India (FMSCI). He became President of the FMSCI in 1984.

In 1988, Hoosein organised the Great Desert-Himalaya Rally, which ran from the Thar Desert of Rajasthan through the Shivalik hills, Himachal and Ladakh. The event ended in Srinagar.

In 1993, Hoosein was elected to the World Motor Sport Council; however, in 1999 the FMSCI decided that it no longer wanted Hoosein to be their representative to the FIA. This led to Hoosein forming the Motorsports Association of India (MAI) in opposition to the FMSCI. Hoosein was an ally of FIA President Max Mosley, and assisted Mosley in gaining votes from the Asian members of the FIA throughout the 1990s.

In 1998, following the British Grand Prix where he was one of the 3 race stewards involved in the controversial manner in which Schumacher had won the race, Hoosein voluntarily surrendered his license to the FIA World Council, admitting that he and the other stewards were at fault for the mishandling of the situation. He regained the license after one year. At the 2002 Malaysian Grand Prix he was again subject to criticism.

In 2000, the FIA decided that MAI should be recognised as motorsport's governing body in India. However, the Indian government refused to recognise the MAI, which meant that Hoosein was unable to represent India at the FIA. A deal was subsequently struck, allowing Hoosein to be a member of the World Motor Sport Council representing the People's Republic of China.

In 2005, Hoosein was elected a Vice President of the FIA for Sport as a member of the candidacy list of Max Mosley, who was re-elected as President of the FIA. The following year he was appointed the chief steward of the World Rally Championship.

Hoosein died on 12 May 2019 after a prolonged illness. He was 78.
