= Sundaram Karivaradhan =

Indian rally driver

Karivardhan
- Born: Sundaram Karivaradhan; 20 June 1954; Coimbatore, Tamil Nadu
- Died: 24 August 1995 (aged 41); Coimbatore, Tamil Nadu
- Occupations: Race driver Business executive
- Father: G.K.Sundaram

Sundaram Karivaradhan Naidu or Kari (20 June 1954 – 24 August 1995) was an Indian formula racing driver, designer and a business executive. He was one of the pioneers of Indian motorsports. He designed the Formula Maruti open wheeled race car and supported Indian racers, notably Narain Karthikeyan, Karun Chandhok, and Armaan Ebrahim, in their entry into motorsports. He was later killed in an air crash, aged 41.

== Early days ==
Sundaram Karivaradhan was born on 20 June 1954 in Coimbatore to G.K.Sundaram Naidu of the Lakshmi Mills textile family.

== Motor racing ==
He attended the Jim Russell racing school. Later, he returned to India and started participating in the races held at Sholavaram, Chennai and Barrackpore, Kolkata. His first race was 1973 Sholavaram Grand Prix meet. Cars he raced ranged from Premier Padmini, Datsun 510, Sipani Dolphin, Formula Atlantic, several cars of his own design and in the final years Formula 3 cars. His last race was in a Formula Ford in Chennai's MMSC track. One of his early complete in-house designs was the Formula Monoposto based on the Formula Atlantic Chevron B40. During the early 1990s he purchased rights from a British-based kit car manufacturer to build replica models of the Ford GT40, using a Ford Cosworth, Lotus 7, and AC Cobra.

In an effort to make racing more affordable in India and improve grassroots level racing he designed and tested a small single seater, dubbed as India's Formula Ford, with a Maruti 800 engine, and adapting easily available parts, sometimes made in-house. His second design was a two-seater car named McDowell 1000 using a Maruti Gypsy 1.0 liter engine. FISSME (Formula India Single Seater Maruti Engine) widely known as formula Maruti was launched in 1988. The class was discontinued from the mainstream championship in 2006.

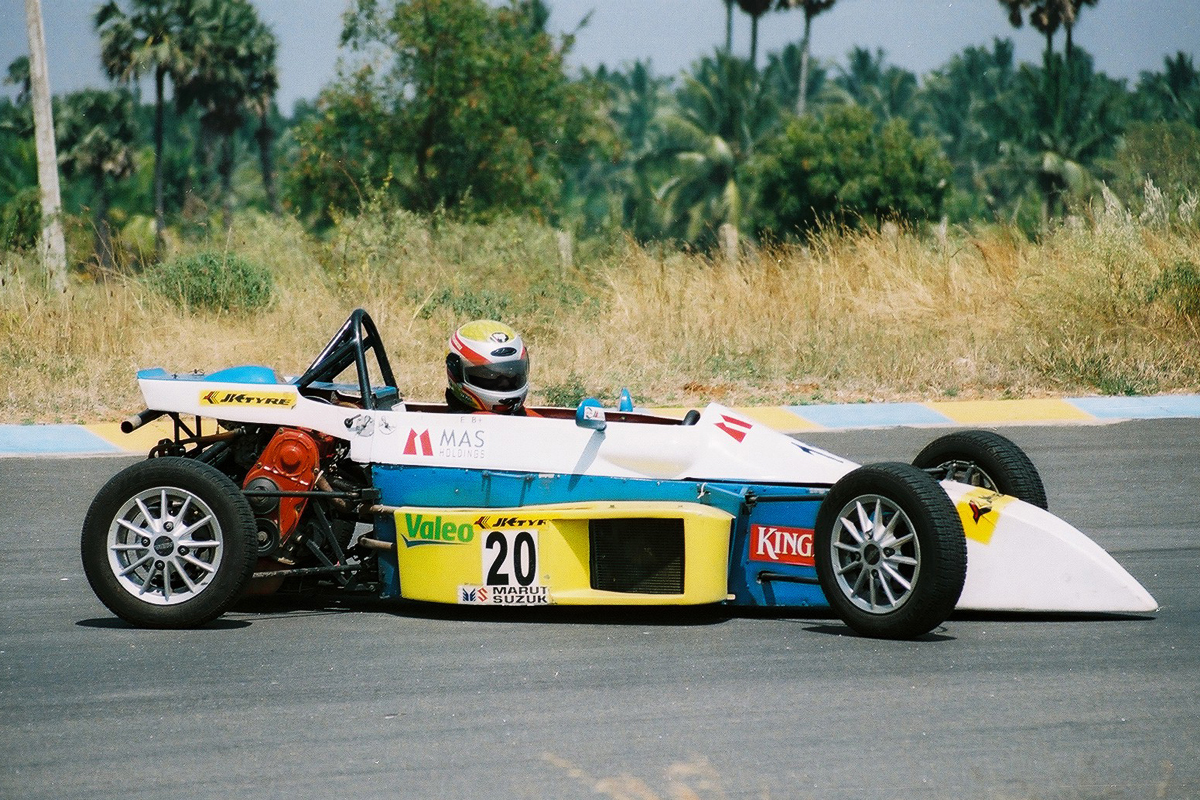
A FISSME or Formula Maruti Single Seater racing Car

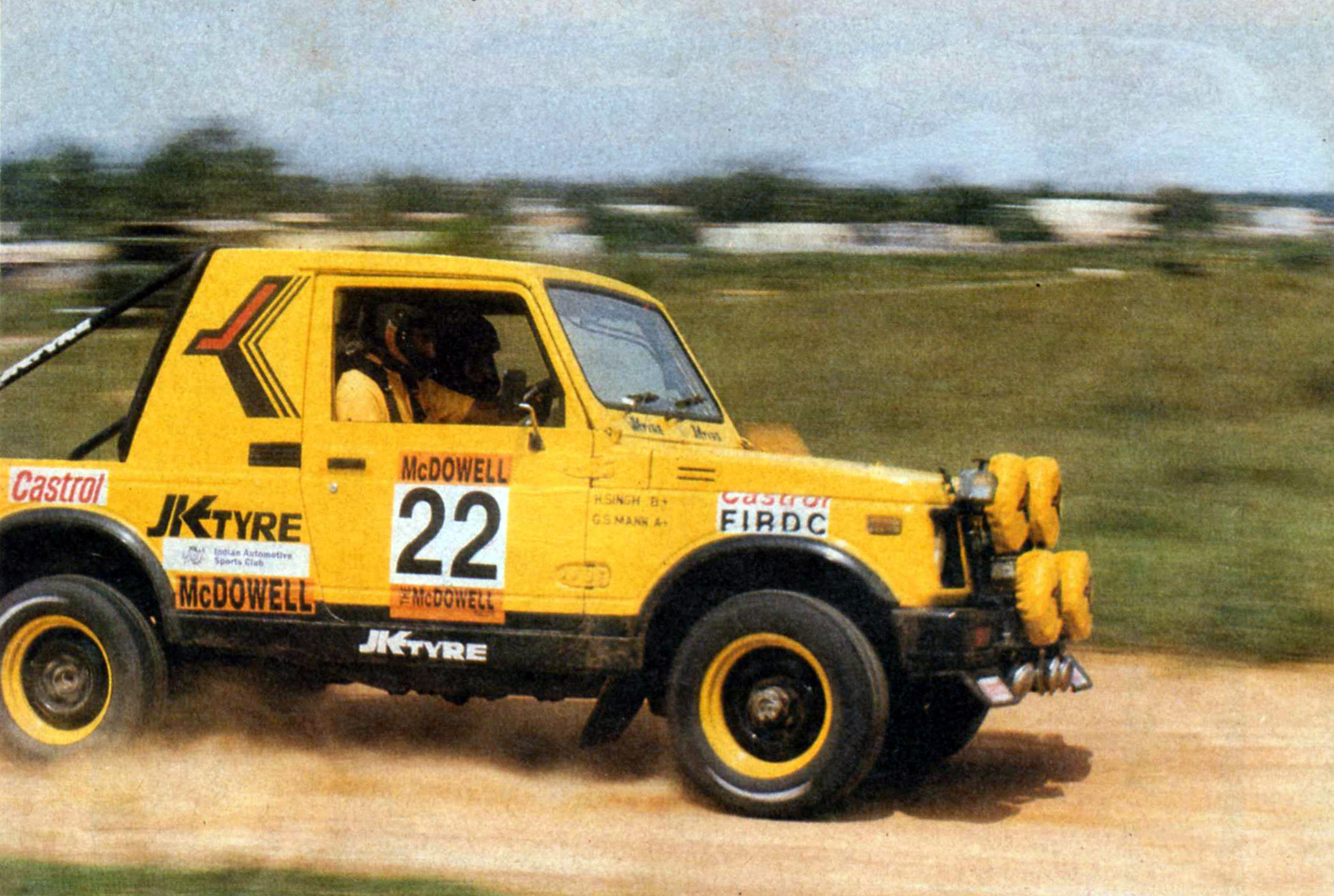
Karivaradhan's rally tuned Team JK tyre Group A2(IND) Rally Gypsy driven by Hari Singh in the 1992 Rally D'Endurance

Kari entered in a few rallies. He later launched the JK Rally team in 1992. Kari's racing team was known as Super Speeds, and the main sponsor was Lakshmi Mills. The early cars had a white and blue body shell which was later switched to black and gold. The company that built his cars was P&B Engineering.

Kari was interested in many areas of mechanics, and that included his interest in aviation as his family owned a Cessna airplane. In 1989 he started a small manufacturing plant near Coimbatore to manufacture Power Gliders using a Yezdi 250cc motorcycle engine, later a Rotax engine. He would often test his gliders flying to the Ooty Mountains, Dindigul, Kovilpatti, or Kayattar near Tirunelveli. The small airstrip in Coimbatore later became the Kari Motor Speedway. In 1989, he also won the McDowell Grand Prix at Sholavaram.

== Death ==
Karivaradhan died on 24 August 1995 while flying a HAL Pushpak trainer aircraft.

== Popular culture ==
The race track in Coimbatore is named after Karivaradhan (Kari Motor Speedway). In June 2019, the GeeDee Car Museum in Coimbatore added a section for Karivardhan as a tribute on his 65th birth anniversary.

== Sources and links ==
- Revisiting Kari, Overdrive Magazine and Forbes India Magazine
- Indian Motorsport and Kari
