= K1000 rally =

Motorsport rally in India

K1000 or Karnataka 1000 Rally is the longest-running motorsports rally in India. It is the third oldest rally in the world. K1000 is the flagship annual event organised by Karnataka Motor Sports Club (KMSC), one of the founder members of FMSCI, the Federation of Motor Sports Clubs of India.

Started in 1975, K1000 is run over 1000 miles over a span of two or more days running across multiple states. Originally run as a Time, Speed Distance (TSD) rally, currently K1000 is run as a Special Stage Rally and is part of the Indian National Rally Championship (INRC).

The 47th edition of the K1000 rally to be held at Tumakuru has attracted 59 entries and will be run over six Special Stages on Saturday and Sunday, the 22 and 23 December 2023.
