= Suzuki Baleno =

The Suzuki Baleno (Japanese: スズキ・バレーノ, Hepburn: Suzuki Barēno) nameplate has been used by the Japanese manufacturer Suzuki to denote several different subcompact cars since 1996.

- From 1996 to 2002, the Baleno that was sold in Europe and Asia-Pacific was a rebadged Cultus Crescent. It was also produced and sold in India as the Maruti Suzuki Baleno until 2007.
- After the introduction of the Aerio in 2001, the Baleno nameplate was discontinued in Europe and Asia Pacific, and remained in use only in Indonesia. This Baleno was a rebadged Aerio sedan, marketed as the Baleno Next-G, and sold from 2003 to 2007.
- From 2008 to 2010, the Indonesian market received a rebadged SX4 sedan, marketed as the Neo Baleno.
- Baleno – A five-door hatchback introduced in 2015.
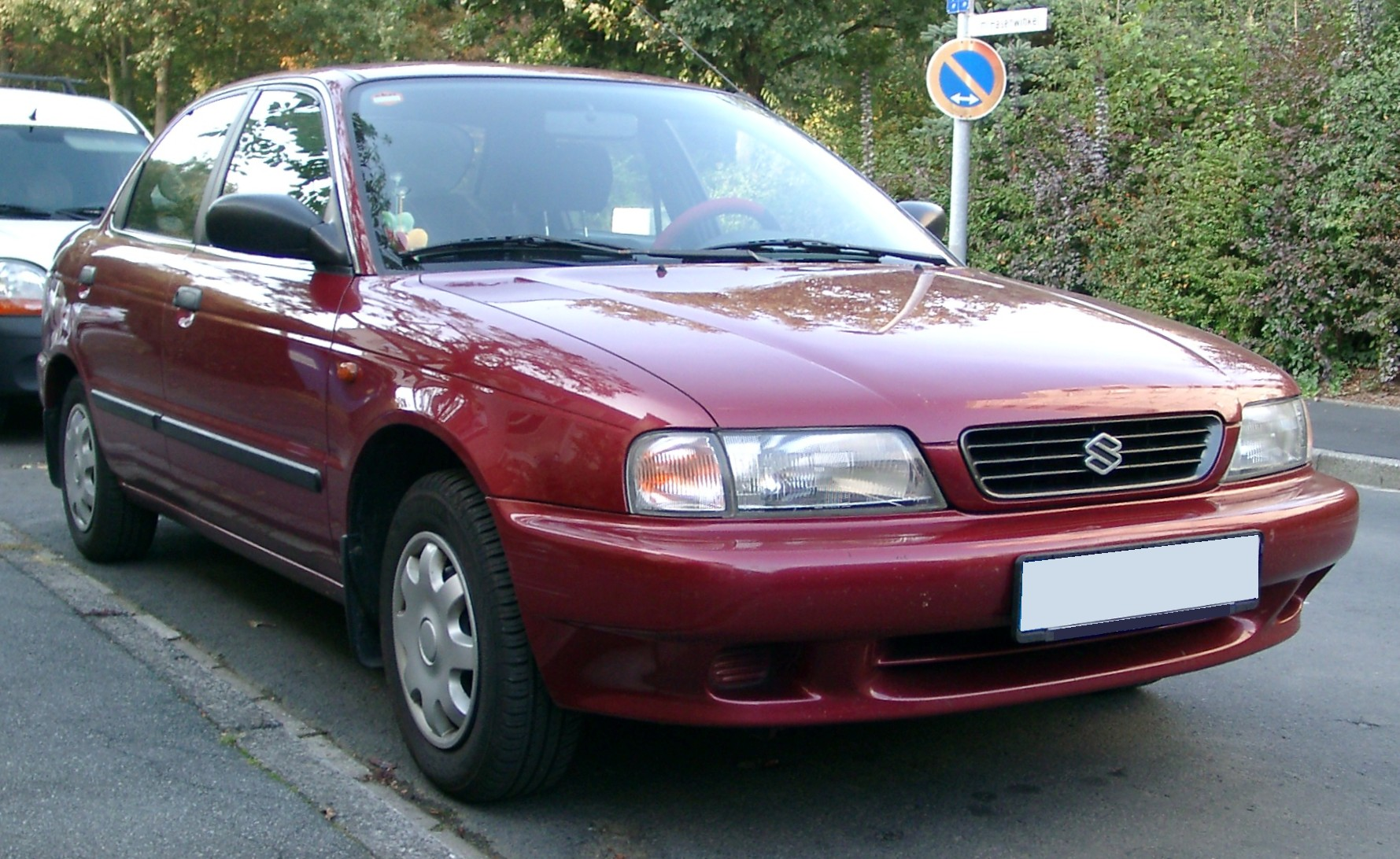
Suzuki Baleno sedan (1996–2002)

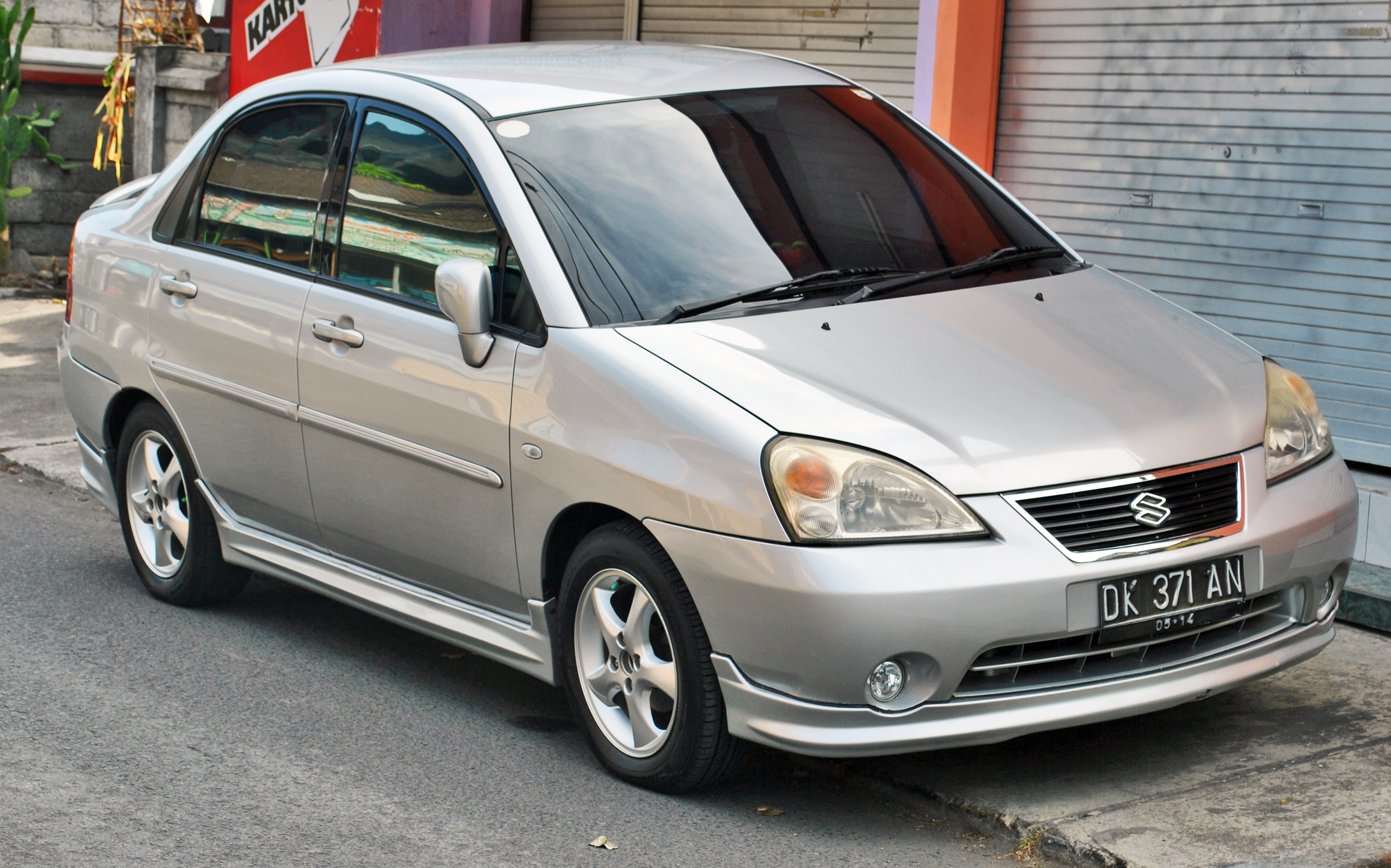
Baleno Next-G sedan (Indonesia, 2003–2007)

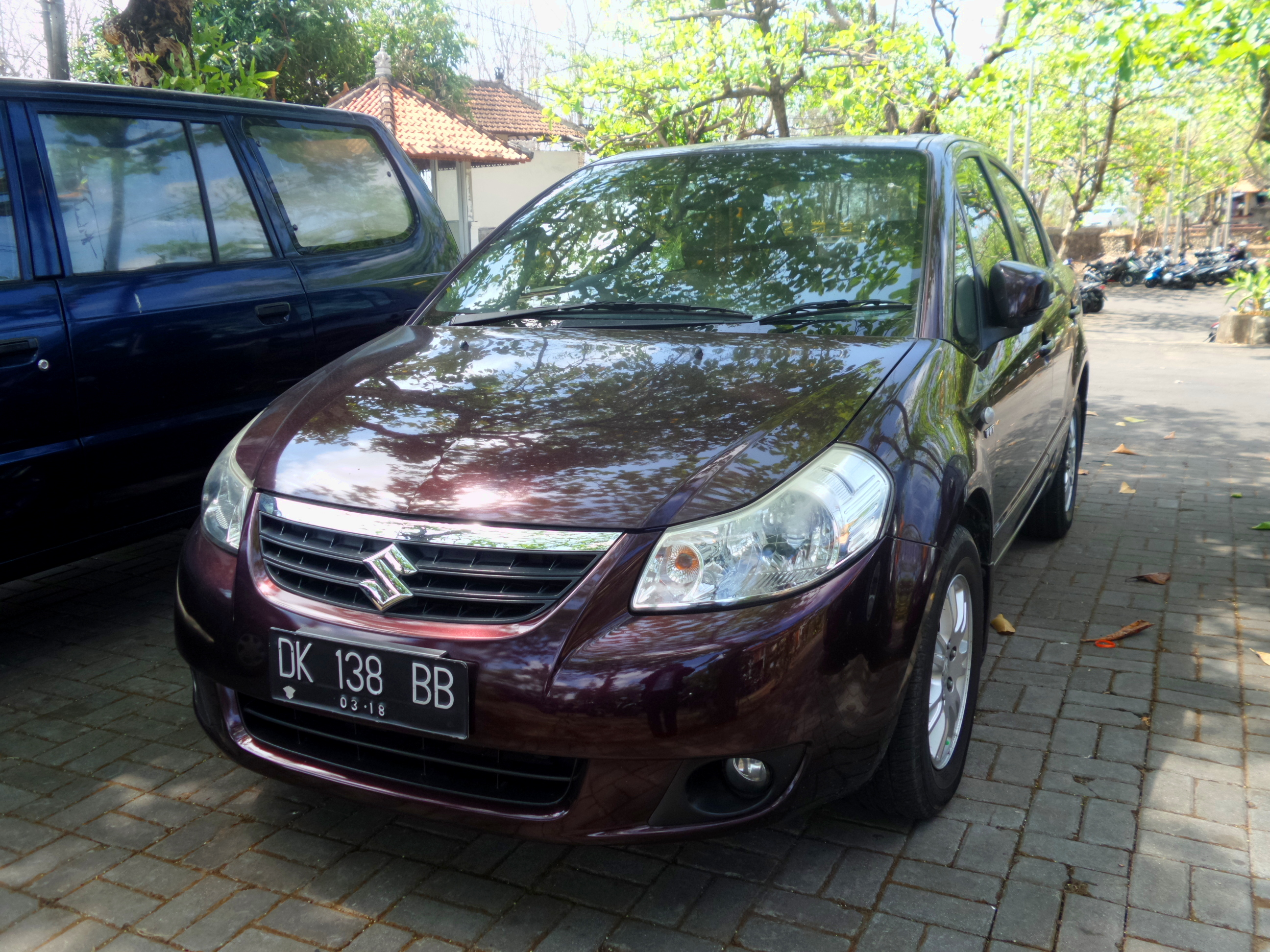
Neo Baleno sedan (Indonesia, 2008–2010)

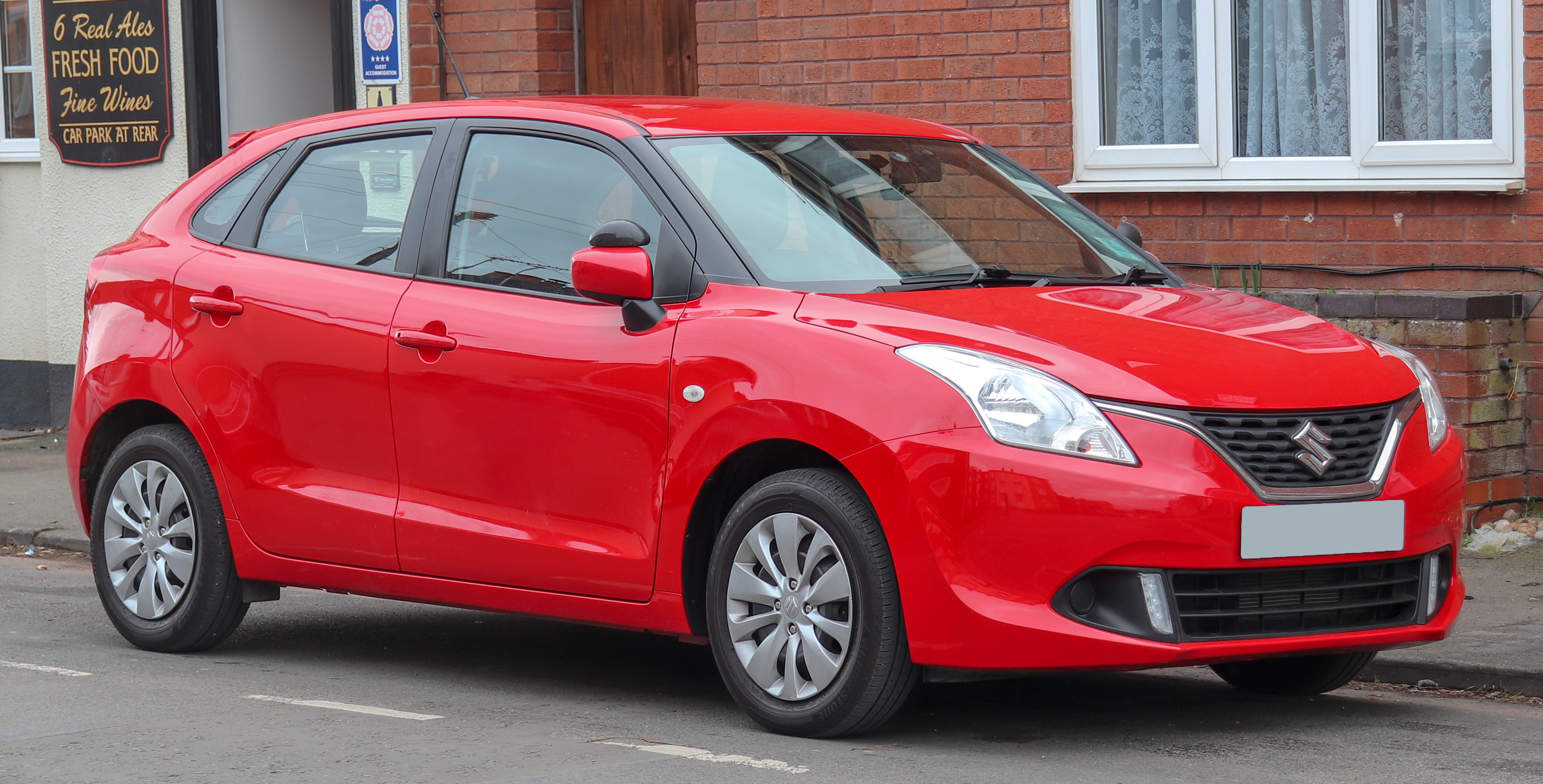
Baleno hatchback (2015–2022)

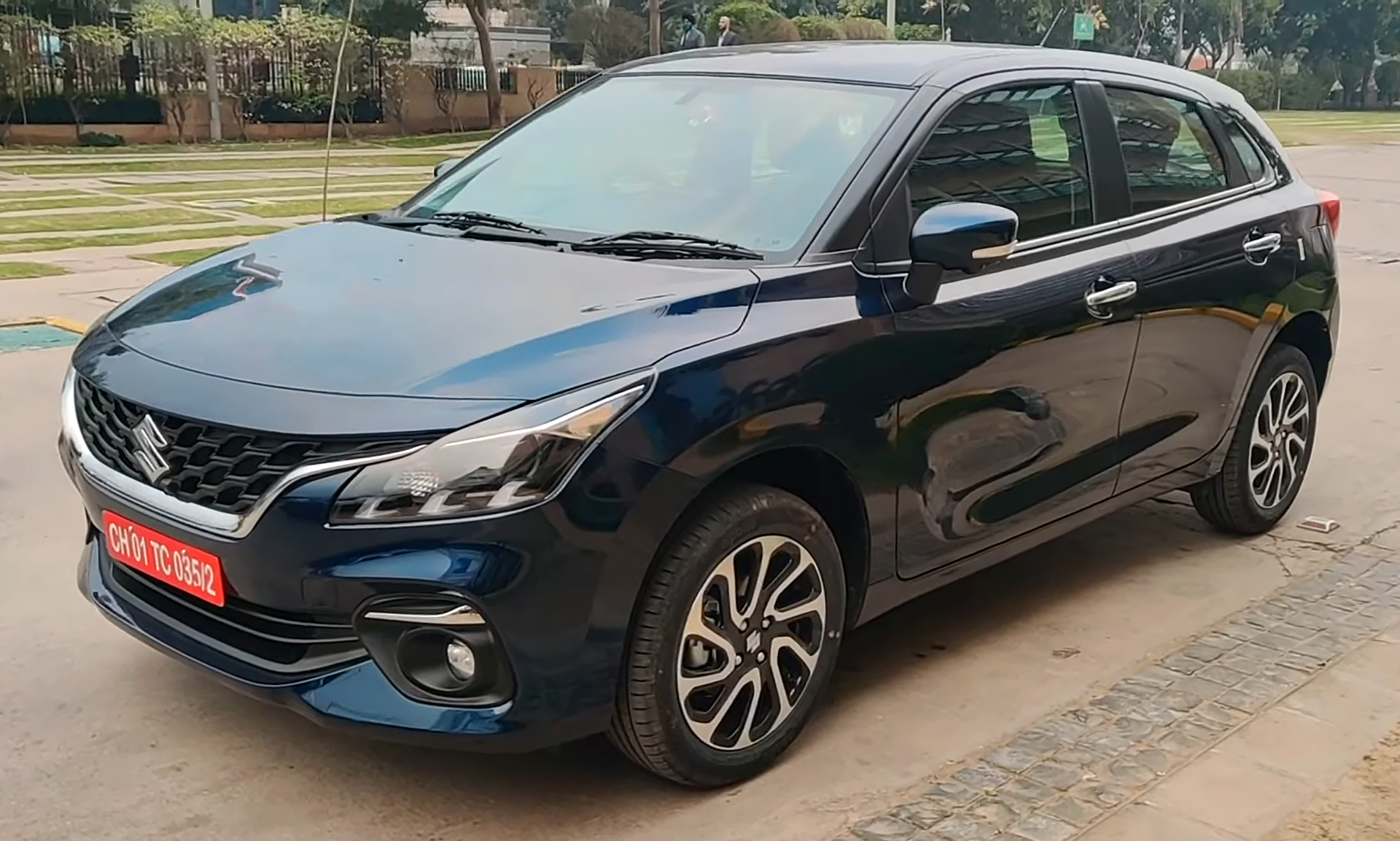
Baleno hatchback (2022–2025) (Indonesia)
