= Federation of Motor Sports Clubs of India =

Governing body for motorsports in India

- Jurisdiction: India
- Founded: 1971; 55 years ago
- Affiliation: Asian Motorcycle Union; Commission Internationale de Karting; Fédération Internationale de l'Automobile; Fédération Internationale de Motocyclisme; Ministry of Youth Affairs and Sports – Government of India
- Headquarters: Chennai, Tamil Nadu, India
- President: Arindam Ghosh
- Vice president: Farooq Ahmed

Official website
- www.fmsci.co.in

The Federation of Motor Sports Clubs of India, abbreviated as FMSCI, is the governing body for motor sports in India and was founded in 1971. It is a long-standing member of the Fédération Internationale de Motocyclisme (FIM) and Fédération Internationale de l'Automobile (FIA), the world bodies for 2/3 and 4 wheeler motor sport respectively.

FMSCI is the only national motor sport federation recognised by the Government of India for promotion and control of motorsport in India, and is affiliated to the Indian Olympic Association. The FMSCI is affiliated to the Asian Motorcycle Union (UAM), the Continental Asian wing of the FIM in 1986. FMSCI has been the FMN of the FIM uninterrupted for the last three decades.

FMSCI was the Indian ASN in FIA from 1979 to 1999 but lost the status for eight years to Motorsports Association of India (MAI) which was formed by founding member Nazir Hoosein, who engineered the split. During this period the FSCI has also violated the National sports policies as communicated by the Sports Authority of India by electing the same president for more than the stipulated terms/years. On 6 April 2000, FIA dismissed FMSCI as the Indian ASN and transferred the ASN status to newly founded MAI. FMSCI was given back the ASN status in April 2008 but MAI briefly won an appeal to retain its power. Finally, FMSCI regained the power in April 2009 to conduct and oversee motor sports activities in the country. However, MAI remained an ordinary member in the FIA till April 2013 when its membership was scrapped on the recommendation of WMSC.

== Founding members ==
In 1971, the Madras Motor Sports Club, Bangalore Motor Sports Club (currently renamed as the Karnataka Motor Sports Club), the Calcutta Motor Sports Club, the Coimbatore Auto Sports Club and the Indian Automotive Racing Club came together to form the National Federation and became the founding members.

FMSCI is registered as a private limited non-profit company under Section 25 of the Companies Act, 1956 in 1973. It is recognized by the Ministry of Youth Affairs and Sports of the Government of India as the only National Sports Federation (NSF) for governing motor sports in the country.

== Activities ==
The main activities of the National Federation are to promote motor sports at the grass-root level all over the country and to raise the standard of the sport by allocating and conducting various events, it trains and deputes technical officials including stewards to conduct events in a safe and fair manner, it formulated the rules and regulations, both sporting and technical, it issues licenses for clubs to conduct the events and for participants to take part in the events.

FMSCI conducts National championships in over 10 different disciplines of motor sports like racing, rallying, karting, autocross, motocross & supercross, gymkhana, and drag. Two of the flagship National events are the Indian National Rally Championship (INRC) and National Racing Championship (NRC) both for two-wheelers and four-wheelers. Nationals with multiple rounds are also conducted by different affiliated clubs which are granted the hosting rights through promoters in karting, supercross and drag. Many club events are also conducted throughout the year. K1000 Rally, South India Rally and the Rally of Coimbatore are some of the regular rallies which are part of the National Championship calendar.

FMSCI also collaborates in the organisation of racing leagues like Indian Racing League and Ceat Indian Supercross Racing League (ISRL).

MRF Tyres and JK Tyres are two of the tyre companies that have taken active part in Indian motor sports since its early days. Other corporates like Indian Oil Corporation, Bharat Petroleum, ITC Limited, United Breweries Group, McDowell's No.1, Birla Tyres, Popular Automobiles, CEAT Tyres, AVT, Goodyear, Maruti were also associated with Indian motor sports as sponsors. TVS has been one of the very active members both in racing and motocross/super cross activities. Volkswagen has also taken part in the national racing and rally championships regularly in the last decade. Other manufacturers Yamaha, Hero Honda and Suzuki have also been conducting one-make races in the National Racing Championships. FMSCI regularly "homologates" the vehicles that take part in the National Championships, with regard to the technical registration of the vehicle, gearbox, and suspension to ensure a level-playing field.

Old logo of FMSCI

The FMSCI has developed over the years a dedicated pool of 98 Stewards, 20 Technical Delegates and a thousand-odd Marshals in addition to the following infrastructure/facilities for motor sport in India: The international race track at Chennai by the Madras Motors Sports Club with international quality transponder/automatic timing equipment implanted at the start/finish line of the track. Go-kart tracks by member clubs at Chennai, Bangalore, Mumbai, Hyderabad, Kolkata, Ahmedabad, Baroda, Ludhiana, New Delhi.

The Federation also provides to the clubs and organisers Calibrated Scrutiny Kits for vehicle inspection, automatic rally-timing devices with printers, HAMS and other communication equipment.

Many of the member clubs and teams run driver and rider academies and schools, to train aspiring racing drivers and riders under the permission and aegis of FMSCI.

The FMSCI runs its activities through a central secretariat located in Chennai, headed by Deputy Secretary General V. S. Shriakant, who is assisted by office-staff, P. Narendran, John Chittaranjan and C. Sivaguru.

== See also ==
- Motorsport in India
- Indian National Rally Championship
- Madras Motor Sports Club
- Kari Motor Speedway
- Force India
- Buddh International Circuit
