= 2025 Dubai 24 Hour =

Motorsport endurance race in Dubai

The layout of the Dubai Autodrome.

The 2025 Michelin Dubai 24 Hour was the 20th running of the Dubai 24 Hour, a motorsport endurance race at the Dubai Autodrome. The race was held from 10–12 January 2025. It was the first round of the 2025 Middle East Trophy.

== Schedule ==
Date	Time (local: GST)	Event	Distance
Friday, 10 January	10:15–11:25	Free practice	90 mins
Friday, 10 January	14:25–15:20	Qualifying sessions – classes TCE, GT4 & GTX	3 × 15 mins
Friday, 10 January	16:00–16:55	Qualifying sessions – class 992	3 × 15 mins
Friday, 10 January	17:05–18:00	Qualifying sessions – class GT3	3 × 15 mins
Friday, 10 January	19:30–21:00	Night practice – All cars	90 mins
Saturday, 11 January	13:00	Race	24 hours
Sunday, 12 January	13:00	Race	24 hours

== Entries ==
No.	Entrant	Car	Class	Driver 1	Driver 2	Driver 3	Driver 4	Driver 5
GT3 (31 entries)
1	(United Arab Emirates) Manamauri Energy by Ebimotors	Porsche 911 GT3 R (992)	P	(Italy) Fabrizio Broggi	(Italy) Sabino de Castro	(Romania) Sergiu Nicolae	(Switzerland) Patric Niederhauser	
4	(Germany) Haupt Racing Team	Mercedes-AMG GT3 Evo	Am	(France) Romain Andriolo	(Germany) Hubert Haupt	(Saudi Arabia) Reema Juffali	(Germany) Salman Owega	
5	(Germany) Team Motopark	Mercedes-AMG GT3 Evo	PA	(Mexico) Sebastián Álvarez	(France) Frédéric Jousset	(Netherlands) Lin Hodenius	(Hungary) Levente Révész	(Netherlands) Thierry Vermeulen
7	(Germany) SMP Racing (Note: SMP Racing is a Russian team, but they compete under a German flag as Russian national emblems were banned by the FIA following the Russian invasion of Ukraine.)	Mercedes-AMG GT3 Evo	P	Vitaly Petrov (Note: Agafonov, Denisov, Gubaydullin, Gutak, Konstantin, Levin, Loboda, Mazepin, Nesov, Petrov, Plekhanov, Pogosyan, Rusinov, Saitov, Salikhov, Shaytar, Sirotkin and Stolyarov are Russian, but they compete as neutral competitors as Russian national emblems were banned by the FIA following the Russian invasion of Ukraine.)	Dennis Remenyako	Sergey Sirotkin	(Kyrgyzstan) Kirill Smal (Note: All following drivers are Russian, but Bukhantsov competes under an Emirati licence, Ekelchik and Mavlanov under an Armenian license, Geshev under a Montenegrin license, Kireev under a Cypriot license and Minsky, Smal and Solukovtsev under a Kyrgyz license as Russian national emblems were banned by the FIA following the Russian invasion of Ukraine.)	Alexander Smolyar
8	(South Africa) Into Africa Racing by Dragon Racing	Ferrari 296 GT3	PA	(United Kingdom) Jason Ambrose	(Republic of Ireland) Matt Griffin	(India) Zaamin Jaffer	(Zimbabwe) Axcil Jefferies	(South Africa) "XO"
11	(Switzerland) Kroll Racing	Mercedes-AMG GT3	Am	(Switzerland) Michael Kroll	(Switzerland) Alexander Prinz	(Switzerland) Chantal Prinz	(Germany) Timo Rumpfkeil	(Germany) Carsten Tilke
16	(Germany) Winward Racing	Mercedes-AMG GT3 Evo	PA	(Italy) Gabriele Piana	Rinat Salikhov	Viktor Shaytar	Sergey Stolyarov	
19	(Netherlands) MP Motorsport	Mercedes-AMG GT3 Evo	PA	(Netherlands) Bert de Heus	(Netherlands) Daniël de Jong	(Netherlands) Henk de Jong	(Netherlands) Jaap van Lagen	
20	(Germany) Huber Motorsport	Porsche 911 GT3 R (992)	Am	(China) Liang Jiatong	(United States) Robert Mau	(United States) Jon Miller	(Germany) Hans Wehrmann	
21	(Antigua and Barbuda) HAAS RT	Audi R8 LMS Evo II	Am	(United Arab Emirates) Alexander Bukhantsov	(Belgium) Peter Guelinckx	(Belgium) Bert Longin	(United Kingdom) James Winslow	
24	(Italy) Dinamic GT	Porsche 911 GT3 R (992)	Am	(Austria) Klaus Bachler	(Denmark) Anders Fjordbach	(Netherlands) Loek Hartog	(Germany) Thomas Kiefer	(Kyrgyzstan) Stanislav Minsky
27	(United States) Heart of Racing by SPS	Mercedes-AMG GT3 Evo	Am	(United States) Hannah Grisham	(United Kingdom) Ian James	(United States) Gray Newell	(Canada) Zacharie Robichon	
30	(Germany) Car Collection Motorsport	Porsche 911 GT3 R (992)	PA	(Switzerland) Alex Fontana	(Slovenia) Matej Knez	(Armenia) Roman Mavlanov	Victor Plekhanov	Damir Saitov
31	(United Kingdom) Team Parker Racing	Bentley Continental GT3	PA	(United Kingdom) Robert Huff	(United Kingdom) Max Lynn	(United Kingdom) Shaun Lynn	(United Kingdom) Scott Malvern	
33	(United Kingdom) Optimum Motorsport	McLaren 720S GT3 Evo	P	(Denmark) Benjamin Goethe	(United Kingdom) Tom Ikin	(United Kingdom) Mikey Porter	(United Kingdom) Morgan Tillbrook	
40	(Belgium) Comtoyou Racing	Aston Martin Vantage AMR GT3 Evo	PA	(United Arab Emirates) Jamie Day	(Belgium) Matisse Lismont	(Belgium) Kobe Pauwels	(Belgium) Tom Van Rompuy	
41	(Belgium) Comtoyou Racing	Aston Martin Vantage AMR GT3 Evo	P	(Belgium) Nicolas Baert	Viacheslav Gutak	(Netherlands) Mex Jansen	(Netherlands) Dante Rappange	
56	(Czech Republic) Scuderia Praha	Ferrari 296 GT3	PA	(Czech Republic) Josef Král	(Slovakia) Matúš Výboh	(Slovakia) Miroslav Výboh	(Czech Republic) Dennis Waszek	
69	(United Arab Emirates) Continental Racing with Simpson Motorsport	Audi R8 LMS Evo II	Am	(Montenegro) Alim Geshev	Mikhail Loboda	David Pogosyan	(Kyrgyzstan) Andrey Solukovtsev	(Cyprus) Vasily Vladykin
77	(New Zealand) Earl Bamber Motorsport	Aston Martin Vantage AMR GT3 Evo	PA	(New Zealand) Earl Bamber	(Indonesia) Setiawan Santoso	(Thailand) Munkong Sathienthirakul	(Thailand) Tanart Sathienthirakul	
80	(Germany) Herberth Motorsport	Porsche 911 GT3 R (992)	Am	(Hong Kong) Antares Au	(Hong Kong) Jonathan Hui	(Macau) Kevin Tse	(Hong Kong) Frank Yu	
81	(United States) Era Motorsport	Ferrari 296 GT3	PA	(United Kingdom) Oliver Bryant	(United Kingdom) Ryan Dalziel	(United Kingdom) Jake Hill	(United States) Dwight Merriman	(United Kingdom) Kyle Tilley
88	(United Arab Emirates) Dragon Racing	Ferrari 296 GT3	PA	(United States) Matt Bell	(United States) Dustin Blattner	(United States) Patrick Liddy	(United States) Blake McDonald	
91	(Germany) Herberth Motorsport	Porsche 911 GT3 R (992)	PA	(Netherlands) Kay van Berlo	(Germany) Ralf Bohn	(United States) Jake Pedersen	(Germany) Alfred Renauer	(Germany) Robert Renauer
92	(Lithuania) Pure Rxcing	Porsche 911 GT3 R (992)	P	(United Kingdom) Harry King	(United Kingdom) Alex Malykhin (Note: Malykhin is Belarusian, but he competes under a British licence as Belarusian national emblems were banned by the FIA following the Russian invasion of Ukraine.)	Alexey Nesov	(Austria) Thomas Preining	
96	GWR Australia	Mercedes-AMG GT3 Evo	Am	(Australia) Brett Hobson	(Australia) Justin Mcmillan	(Australia) Michael Sheargold	(Australia) Garth Walden	(Australia) Glen Wood
99	(Germany) Tresor Attempto Racing	Audi R8 LMS Evo II	P	(Germany) Alex Aka	(China) Yi Deng	(Germany) Dennis Marschall	(Italy) Lorenzo Patrese	(China) Mike Zhou
269	(Germany) Herberth Motorsport	Porsche 911 GT3 R (992)	Am	(Germany) Christoph Breuer	(Germany) Vincent Kolb	(Germany) Max Moritz	(Germany) Florian Spengler	
777	(Belgium) Al Manar Racing by Team WRT	BMW M4 GT3 Evo	P	(Oman) Al Faisal Al Zubair	(United Kingdom) Dan Harper	(Germany) Max Hesse	(United Kingdom) Darren Leung	(United Kingdom) Ben Tuck
969	(Germany) Proton Huber Competition	Porsche 911 GT3 R (992)	PA	(Finland) Jukka Honkavuori	(Finland) Jani Käkelä	(United Arab Emirates) Bashar Mardini	(Dominican Republic) Joel Monegro	(Finland) Kalle Rovanperä
991	(United Kingdom) Paradine Competition	BMW M4 GT3 Evo	Am	(Oman) Ahmad Al Harthy	(United Kingdom) Darren Leung	(United Kingdom) Toby Sowery	(United Kingdom) Simon Traves	
GTX (5 entries)
111	(Australia) 111 Racing	IRC GT		(Australia) Jake Camilleri	(Australia) Darren Currie	(Australia) Grant Donaldson	(Australia) Mark Griffith	
701	(France) Vortex V8	Vortex 2.0		(France) Lionel Amrouche	(France) Solenn Amrouche	(France) Philippe Bonnel	(France) Gilles Courtois	
710	(Germany) Leipert Motorsport	Lamborghini Huracán Super Trofeo Evo 2		(Switzerland) "Takis"	(New Zealand) Brendon Leitch	(China) JJ Song	(United States) Gerhard Watzinger	(United States) Don Yount
795	(France) Team CMR	Ginetta G56 GTX		(France) Erwin Creed	(France) Ethan Gialdini	(Belgium) Rodolphe Gillion	(France) Hugo Mogica	(France) Eric Mouez
797	(France) Graff Racing	Rossa LM GT		(Cyprus) Evgeny Kireev	Nikita Mazepin	(United Kingdom) Harrison Newey	Roman Rusinov	
992 (19 entries)
888	(France) SebLajoux Racing	Porsche 992 GT3 Cup	Am	(France) Mathys Jaubert	(France) Sebastien Lajoux	(Belgium) Alexandre Leroy	(France) Stephane Perrin	(France) Louis Perrot
901	(India) Ajith Kumar Racing by Bas Koeten Racing	Porsche 992 GT3 Cup	P	(Belgium) Fabian Duffieux	(Belgium) Mathieu Detry	(India) Ajith Kumar	(Australia) Cameron McLeod	
909	(Netherlands) Red Camel-Jordans.nl	Porsche 992 GT3 Cup	P	(Netherlands) Ivo Breukers	(Netherlands) Luc Breukers	(Netherlands) Rik Breukers	(Switzerland) Fabian Danz	
911	(France) TFT Racing	Porsche 992 GT3 Cup	Am	(France) Jordan Boisson	(France) Jérôme Boullery	(France) Patrick Charlaix	(Belgium) Benjamin Paque	
912	(Netherlands) Tierra Outdoor Racing by Hans Weijs Motorsport	Porsche 992 GT3 Cup	P	(Netherlands) Huub van Eijndhoven	(Netherlands) Lucas van Eijndhoven	(Netherlands) Jop Rappange	(Netherlands) Ralph Poppelaars	
914	(Austria) Razoon – More Than Racing	Porsche 992 GT3 Cup	P	(Poland) Artur Chwist	(Denmark) Simon Birch	(Austria) Daniel Drexel	(Armenia) Ivan Ekelchik	
917	(Italy) Fulgenzi Racing	Porsche 992 GT3 Cup	P	(Italy) Enrico Fulgenzi	(United Arab Emirates) Alessandro Giannone	(Italy) Andrea Girondi	(Netherlands) Sam Jongejan	
918	(Belgium) Mühlner Motorsport	Porsche 992 GT3 Cup	Am	(Germany) Ben Bünnagel	Alexey Denisov	(Estonia) Martin Rump	(United States) Bryan Sircely	
928	(Germany) HRT Performance	Porsche 992 GT3 Cup	Am	(France) Stéphane Adler	(France) Michael Blanchemain	(France) Jérôme da Costa	(France) Franck Eburderie	(France) Franck Lavergne
929	(Germany) HRT Performance	Porsche 992 GT3 Cup	Am	(France) Sylvain Caroff	(France) Julien Jacquel	(France) Jean Michel Marie	(Germany) Alex Renner	(France) Vincent Roche
930	(Germany) HRT Performance	Porsche 992 GT3 Cup	Am	(Germany) Holger Harmsen	(United States) Gregg Gorski	(Germany) Marlon Menden	(Switzerland) Silvain Pastoris	
938	(France) GP Racing Team	Porsche 992 GT3 Cup	P	(France) Victor Bernier	(France) Enzo Joulié	(France) Gabriel Pemeant	(France) Loïc Teire	
950	(United Arab Emirates) Duel Racing by Huber	Porsche 992 GT3 Cup	P	(United Kingdom) Phil Keen	(United Arab Emirates) Nabil Moutran	(United Arab Emirates) Ramzi Moutran	(United Arab Emirates) Sami Moutran	(Germany) Theo Oeverhaus
971	(United Arab Emirates) RABDAN by Fulgenzi Racing	Porsche 992 GT3 Cup	Am	(United Arab Emirates) Saif Alameri	(United Arab Emirates) Salem Alketbi	(United Arab Emirates) Fahad Alzaabi	(Austria) Christopher Zöchling	
974	(Qatar) QMMF by HRT	Porsche 992 GT3 Cup	Am	(Qatar) Ibrahim Al-Abdulghani	(Qatar) Abdulla Ali Al-Khelaifi	(Qatar) Ghanim Ali Al Maadheed	(Germany) Julian Hanses	
978	(Belgium) Speed Lover	Porsche 992 GT3 Cup	Am	(Belgium) Stienes Longin	(Belgium) Wim Meulders	(Belgium) Gilles Renmans	(Belgium) Rik Renmans	(Belgium) John de Wilde
989	(Japan) Seven × Seven Racing	Porsche 992 GT3 Cup	P	(Japan) "Bankcy"	(Japan) Kiyoto Fujinami	(Japan) Tsubasa Kondo	(Japan) Taichi Watarai	
990	(Japan) JBR	Porsche 992 GT3 Cup	Am	(Japan) Yasutaka Ando	(Japan) Taku Bamba	(Japan) Kiwamu Katayama	(Japan) Norikazu Shibata	(United Kingdom) David Tan
992	(France) SebLajoux Racing	Porsche 992 GT3 Cup	Am	(Kazakhstan) Alexandr Artemyev	(Netherlands) Paul Meijer	(France) Lauris Nauroy	(France) Louis Perrot	(France) Lucas Sugliano
GT4 (6 entries)
414	(Austria) Razoon – More Than Racing	Porsche 718 Cayman GT4 RS Clubsport		(India) Ajith Kumar	(Austria) Leo Pichler	(Austria) Dominik Olbert		
427	(Germany) SRS Team Sorg Rennsport	Porsche 718 Cayman GT4 RS Clubsport		(Switzerland) Gero Bauknecht	(Sweden) Tommy Gråberg	(United Kingdom) Harley Haughton	(United States) Arthur Simondet	
438	(United Kingdom) AGMC Racing by Simpson Motorsport	BMW M4 GT4 Gen II		(Canada) Ramez Azzam	(United Kingdom) Tim Docker	(United States) Tiger Tari	(Ghana) William Tewiah	(Romania) Tudor Tudurachi
470	(Germany) WS Racing	BMW M4 GT4 Gen II		(Netherlands) Jeroen Bleekemolen	(Netherlands) Emely de Heus	(United States) Keith Gatehouse	(United Kingdom) George King	(United States) Tim Pappas
495	(France) Team CMR	Ginetta G56 GT4 Evo		(France) Nico Prost	(United Kingdom) Mike Simpson	(United Kingdom) Freddie Tomlinson	(United Kingdom) Lawrence Tomlinson	
496	(United Arab Emirates) Continental TTR Racing	Toyota GR Supra GT4 Evo		Viktor Agafonov	Marat Gubaydullin	Dimitry Levin	Konstantin Mandrikov	
TCX (3 entries)
101	(Germany) asBest Racing	SEAT León Cup Racer		(Switzerland) Thomas Alpiger	(United Arab Emirates) Mohammed Al Owais	(Germany) Christian Ladurner	(Germany) Pia Ohlsson	(United Arab Emirates) Nadir Zuhour
102	(Germany) asBest Racing	Cupra León TCR		(India) Akshay Gupta	(Germany) Lutz Obermann	(Sweden) Henrik Sandell	(Japan) Junichi Umemoto	(United Arab Emirates) Nadir Zuhour
127	(Germany) SRS Team Sorg Rennsport	Porsche 718 Cayman GT4 Clubsport		(France) Thierry Chkondali	(Japan) Yasuhiro Misashi	(Japan) Yutaka Seki	(Mexico) Benito Tagle	

GT3 entries
Icon	Class
P	GT3-Pro
PA	GT3-Pro Am
Am	GT3-Am
992 entries
Icon	Class
P	992-Pro
Am	992-Am

== Results ==
=== Qualifying ===
Pole positions in each class are denoted in bold.

==== GT3 ====
Fastest in class in **bold**.

Pos.	Class	No.	Team	Time	Grid
1	**GT3-Pro**	**92**	**(Lithuania) Pure Rxcing**	**1:58.353**	**1**
2	**GT3-Pro Am**	**16**	**(Germany) Winward Racing**	**1:58.857**	**2**
3	GT3-Pro	24	(Italy) Dinamic GT	1:58.900	3
4	GT3-Pro	777	(Belgium) Al Manar Racing by Team WRT	1:59.039	4
5	GT3-Pro Am	88	(United Arab Emirates) Dragon Racing	1:59.368	5
6	GT3-Pro Am	91	(Germany) Herberth Motorsport	1:59.425	6
7	GT3-Pro	7	(Germany) SMP Racing	1:59.425	7
8	**GT3-Am**	**991**	**(United Kingdom) Paradine Competition**	**1:59.439**	**8**
9	GT3-Am	4	(Germany) Haupt Racing Team	1:59.624	9
10	GT3-Pro Am	19	(Netherlands) MP Motorsport	1:59.630	10
11	GT3-Pro	33	(United Kingdom) Optimum Motorsport	1:59.703	11
12	GT3-Pro	1	(United Arab Emirates) Manamauri Energy by Ebimotors	1:59.979	12
13	GT3-Am	21	(Antigua and Barbuda) HAAS RT	2:00.026	13
14	GT3-Am	269	(Germany) Herberth Motorsport	2:00.028	14
15	GT3-Am	27	(United States) Heart of Racing by SPS	2:00.116	15
16	GT3-Pro Am	40	(Belgium) Comtoyou Racing	2:00.138	16
17	GT3-Pro Am	8	(South Africa) Into Africa Racing by Dragon Racing	2:00.179	17
18	GT3-Pro Am	969	(Germany) Proton Huber Competition	2:00.293	18
19	GT3-Am	11	(Switzerland) Hofor Racing	2:00.358	19
20	GT3-Am	20	(Germany) Huber Motorsport	2:00.498	20
21	GT3-Pro Am	77	(New Zealand) Earl Bamber Motorsport	2:00.293	21
22	GT3-Pro Am	56	(Czech Republic) Scuderia Praha	2:00.549	22
23	GT3-Am	80	(Germany) Herberth Motorsport	2:00.687	23
24	GT3-Pro Am	81	(United States) Era Motorsport	2:00.771	24
25	GT3-Pro	41	(Belgium) Comtoyou Racing	2:00.953	25
26	GT3-Pro Am	31	(United Kingdom) Team Parker Racing	2:00.971	28^{1}
27	GT3-Pro Am	5	(Germany) Team Motopark	2:01.058	26
28	GT3-Am	96	GWR Australia	2:01.062	27
29	GT3-Pro Am	30	(Germany) Car Collection Motorsport	2:01.086	29
30	GT3-Am	69	(Australia) Continental Racing with Simpson Motorsport	2:01.945	30
31	GT3-Pro	99	(Germany) Tresor Attempto Racing	No time	-

==== 992 ====
Fastest in class in **bold**.

Pos.	Class	No.	Team	Time	Grid
1	**992**	**909**	**(Netherlands) Red Camel-Jordans.nl**	**2:02.508**	**33^{2}**
2	**992-Am**	**888**	**(France) SebLajoux Racing**	**2:02.695**	**35^{3}**
3	992	992	(France) SebLajoux Racing	2:03.084	32
4	992	950	(United Arab Emirates) Duel Racing by Huber	2:03.148	34
5	992	917	(Italy) Fulgenzi Racing	2:03.202	36
6	992-Am	974	(Qatar) QMMF by HRT	2:03.337	38
7	992	901	(India) Ajith Kumar Racing by Bas Koeten Racing	2:03.476	39
8	992	912	(Netherlands) Tierra Outdoor Racing by Hans Weijs Motorsport	2:03.589	40
9	992-Am	911	(Switzerland) TFT Racing	2:03.649	41
10	992	938	(France) GP Racing Team	2:03.649	42
11	992	989	(Japan) Seven × Seven Racing	2:03.727	43
12	992-Am	978	(Belgium) Speed Lover	2:04.768	44
13	992-Am	971	(United Arab Emirates) RABDAN by Fulgenzi Racing	2:04.775	45
14	992-Am	914	(Austria) Razoon – More Than Racing	2:05.284	48
15	992-Am	930	(Germany) HRT Performance	2:05.346	49
16	992-Am	990	(Japan) JBR	2:05.684	50
17	992-Am	918	(Belgium) Mühlner Motorsport	2:06.460	51
18	992-Am	928	(Germany) HRT Performance	2:06.564	52
19	992-Am	929	(Germany) HRT Performance	2:07.316	53

==== GTX, GT4 & TCX ====
Fastest in class in **bold**.

Pos.	Class	No.	Team	Time	Grid
1	**GTX**	**710**	**(Germany) Leipert Motorsport**	**2:02.377**	**31**
2	GTX	795	(France) Team CMR	2:03.273	37
3	GTX	111	(Australia) 111 Racing	2:03.921	46^{4}
4	GTX	701	(France) Vortex V8	2:04.908	47
5	**GT4**	**495**	**(France) Team CMR**	**2:09.618**	**54**
6	GT4	470	(Germany) WS Racing	2:10.898	55
7	GT4	438	(United Kingdom) AGMC Racing by Simpson Motorsport	2:11.297	56
8	GT4	427	(Germany) SRS Team Sorg Rennsport	2:11.545	57
9	GT4	414	(Austria) razoon – more than racing	2:13.016	58
10	GT4	496	(United Arab Emirates) Continental TTR Racing	2:13.016	59
11	**TCX**	**102**	**(Germany) asBest Racing**	**2:18.093**	**60**
12	TCX	101	(Germany) asBest Racing	2:19.064	61
13	GTX	797	(France) Graff Racing	No time	62^{5}
14	TCX	127	(Germany) SRS Team Sorg Rennsport	No time	63

Notes
The following cars received a drop of start grid positions as a result of Race Director decisions:

- **^1** Car 31 – 2 position grid drop
- **^2** Car 992 – 2 position grid drop
- **^3** Car 888 – 2 position grid drop
- **^4** Car 111 – 2 position grid drop
- **^5** Car 797 – All qualifying times deleted

== Race ==
=== Half distance ===
Class winner in bold.

Pos	Class	No.	Team	Drivers	Chassis	Time/Reason	Laps	Points
Pos	Class	No.	Team	Drivers	Engine	Time/Reason	Laps	Points
1	**GT3-Pro**	**24**	**(Italy) Dinamic GT**	**(Austria) Klaus Bachler (Denmark) Anders Fjordbach (Netherlands) Loek Hartog (Germany) Thomas Kiefer (Kyrgyzstan) Stanislav Minsky**	**Porsche 911 GT3 R (992)**	**11:58:04.817**	**295**	**20**
1	**GT3-Pro**	**24**	**(Italy) Dinamic GT**	**(Austria) Klaus Bachler (Denmark) Anders Fjordbach (Netherlands) Loek Hartog (Germany) Thomas Kiefer (Kyrgyzstan) Stanislav Minsky**	**Porsche M97/80 4.2 L Flat-6**	**11:58:04.817**	**295**	**20**
2	GT3-Pro	777	(Belgium) AlManar Racing by Team WRT	(Oman) Al Faisal Al Zubair (United Kingdom) Dan Harper (Germany) Max Hesse (United Kingdom) Darren Leung (United Kingdom) Ben Tuck	BMW M4 GT3 Evo	+1:35.239	295	18
2	GT3-Pro	777	(Belgium) AlManar Racing by Team WRT	(Oman) Al Faisal Al Zubair (United Kingdom) Dan Harper (Germany) Max Hesse (United Kingdom) Darren Leung (United Kingdom) Ben Tuck	BMW S58B30T0 3.0 L Turbo I6	+1:35.239	295	18
3	GT3-Pro	92	(Lithuania) Pure Rxcing	(United Kingdom) Harry King (United Kingdom) Alex Malykhin; Alexey Nesov (Austria) Thomas Preining	Porsche 911 GT3 R (992)	+1 Lap	294	16
3	GT3-Pro	92	(Lithuania) Pure Rxcing	(United Kingdom) Harry King (United Kingdom) Alex Malykhin; Alexey Nesov (Austria) Thomas Preining	Porsche M97/80 4.2 L Flat-6	+1 Lap	294	16
4	**GT3-Am**	**991**	**(United Kingdom) Paradine Competition**	**(Oman) Ahmad Al Harthy (United Kingdom) Darren Leung (United Kingdom) Toby Sowery (United Kingdom) Simon Traves**	**BMW M4 GT3 Evo**	**+1 Lap**	**294**	**14 (20)**
4	**GT3-Am**	**991**	**(United Kingdom) Paradine Competition**	**(Oman) Ahmad Al Harthy (United Kingdom) Darren Leung (United Kingdom) Toby Sowery (United Kingdom) Simon Traves**	**BMW S58B30T0 3.0 L Turbo I6**	**+1 Lap**	**294**	**14 (20)**
5	**GT3-Pro Am**	**16**	**(Germany) Winward Racing**	**(Italy) Gabriele Piana; Rinat Salikhov; Viktor Shaytar; Sergey Stolyarov**	**Mercedes-AMG GT3 Evo**	**+2 Laps**	**293**	**12 (20)**
5	**GT3-Pro Am**	**16**	**(Germany) Winward Racing**	**(Italy) Gabriele Piana; Rinat Salikhov; Viktor Shaytar; Sergey Stolyarov**	**Mercedes-AMG M159 6.2 L V8**	**+2 Laps**	**293**	**12 (20)**
6	GT3-Am	80	(Germany) Herberth Motorsport	(Hong Kong) Antares Au (Hong Kong) Jonathan Hui (Macau) Kevin Tse (Hong Kong) Frank Yu	Porsche 911 GT3 R (992)	+2 Laps	293	10 (18)
6	GT3-Am	80	(Germany) Herberth Motorsport	(Hong Kong) Antares Au (Hong Kong) Jonathan Hui (Macau) Kevin Tse (Hong Kong) Frank Yu	Porsche M97/80 4.2 L Flat-6	+2 Laps	293	10 (18)
7	GT3-Pro	7	(Germany) SMP Racing	Vitaly Petrov; Dennis Remenyako; Sergey Sirotkin (Kyrgyzstan) Kirill Smal; Alexander Smolyar	Mercedes-AMG GT3 Evo	+2 Laps	293	9
7	GT3-Pro	7	(Germany) SMP Racing	Vitaly Petrov; Dennis Remenyako; Sergey Sirotkin (Kyrgyzstan) Kirill Smal; Alexander Smolyar	Mercedes-AMG M159 6.2 L V8	+2 Laps	293	9
8	GT3-Pro	1	(United Arab Emirates) Manamauri Energy by Ebimotors	(Italy) Fabrizio Broggi (Italy) Sabino de Castro (Romania) Sergiu Nicolae (Switzerland) Patric Niederhauser	Porsche 911 GT3 R (992)	+3 Laps	292	8
8	GT3-Pro	1	(United Arab Emirates) Manamauri Energy by Ebimotors	(Italy) Fabrizio Broggi (Italy) Sabino de Castro (Romania) Sergiu Nicolae (Switzerland) Patric Niederhauser	Porsche M97/80 4.2 L Flat-6	+3 Laps	292	8
9	GT3-Pro Am	91	(Germany) Herberth Motorsport	(Netherlands) Kay van Berlo (Germany) Ralf Bohn (United States) Jake Pedersen (Germany) Alfred Renauer (Germany) Robert Renauer	Porsche 911 GT3 R (992)	+3 Laps	292	7 (18)
9	GT3-Pro Am	91	(Germany) Herberth Motorsport	(Netherlands) Kay van Berlo (Germany) Ralf Bohn (United States) Jake Pedersen (Germany) Alfred Renauer (Germany) Robert Renauer	Porsche M97/80 4.2 L Flat-6	+3 Laps	292	7 (18)
10	GT3-Am	4	(Germany) Haupt Racing Team	(France) Romain Andriolo (Germany) Hubert Haupt (Saudi Arabia) Reema Juffali (Germany) Salman Owega	Mercedes-AMG GT3 Evo	+3 Laps	292	6 (16)
10	GT3-Am	4	(Germany) Haupt Racing Team	(France) Romain Andriolo (Germany) Hubert Haupt (Saudi Arabia) Reema Juffali (Germany) Salman Owega	Mercedes-AMG M159 6.2 L V8	+3 Laps	292	6 (16)
11	GT3-Pro	33	(United Kingdom) Optimum Motorsport	(Denmark) Benjamin Goethe (United Kingdom) Tom Ikin (United Kingdom) Mikey Porter (United Kingdom) Morgan Tillbrook	McLaren 720S GT3 Evo	+3 Laps	292	5
11	GT3-Pro	33	(United Kingdom) Optimum Motorsport	(Denmark) Benjamin Goethe (United Kingdom) Tom Ikin (United Kingdom) Mikey Porter (United Kingdom) Morgan Tillbrook	McLaren M840T 4.0 L Turbo V8	+3 Laps	292	5
12	GT3-Am	21	(Antigua and Barbuda) HAAS RT	(United Arab Emirates) Alexander Bukhantsov (Belgium) Peter Guelinckx (Belgium) Bert Longin (United Kingdom) James Winslow	Audi R8 LMS Evo II	+4 Laps	291	4 (14)
12	GT3-Am	21	(Antigua and Barbuda) HAAS RT	(United Arab Emirates) Alexander Bukhantsov (Belgium) Peter Guelinckx (Belgium) Bert Longin (United Kingdom) James Winslow	Audi DAR 5.2 L V10	+4 Laps	291	4 (14)
13	GT3-Pro Am	40	(Belgium) Comtoyou Racing	(United Arab Emirates) Jamie Day (Belgium) Matisse Lismont (Belgium) Kobe Pauwels (Belgium) Tom Van Rompuy	Aston Martin Vantage AMR GT3 Evo	+4 Laps	291	3 (16)
13	GT3-Pro Am	40	(Belgium) Comtoyou Racing	(United Arab Emirates) Jamie Day (Belgium) Matisse Lismont (Belgium) Kobe Pauwels (Belgium) Tom Van Rompuy	Aston Martin M177 4.0 L Twin-Turbo V8	+4 Laps	291	3 (16)
14	GT3-Am	269	(Germany) Herberth Motorsport	(Germany) Christoph Breuer (Germany) Vincent Kolb (Germany) Max Moritz (Germany) Florian Spengler	Porsche 911 GT3 R (992)	+5 Laps	290	2 (12)
14	GT3-Am	269	(Germany) Herberth Motorsport	(Germany) Christoph Breuer (Germany) Vincent Kolb (Germany) Max Moritz (Germany) Florian Spengler	Porsche M97/80 4.2 L Flat-6	+5 Laps	290	2 (12)
15	GT3-Pro Am	8	(South Africa) Into Africa Racing by Dragon Racing	(United Kingdom) Jason Ambrose (Republic of Ireland) Matt Griffin (India) Zaamin Jaffer (Zimbabwe) Axcil Jefferies (South Africa) Xollie Letlaka	Ferrari 296 GT3	+5 Laps	290	1 (14)
15	GT3-Pro Am	8	(South Africa) Into Africa Racing by Dragon Racing	(United Kingdom) Jason Ambrose (Republic of Ireland) Matt Griffin (India) Zaamin Jaffer (Zimbabwe) Axcil Jefferies (South Africa) Xollie Letlaka	Ferrari F163 3.0 L Turbo V6	+5 Laps	290	1 (14)
16	GT3-Am	11	(Switzerland) Hofor Racing	(Switzerland) Michael Kroll (Switzerland) Alexander Prinz (Switzerland) Chantal Prinz (Germany) Timo Rumpfkeil (Germany) Carsten Tilke	Mercedes-AMG GT3	+5 Laps	290	0 (10)
16	GT3-Am	11	(Switzerland) Hofor Racing	(Switzerland) Michael Kroll (Switzerland) Alexander Prinz (Switzerland) Chantal Prinz (Germany) Timo Rumpfkeil (Germany) Carsten Tilke	Mercedes-AMG M159 6.2 L V8	+5 Laps	290	0 (10)
17	GT3-Am	27	(United States) Heart of Racing by SPS	(United States) Hannah Grisham (United Kingdom) Ian James (United States) Gray Newell (Canada) Zacharie Robichon	Mercedes-AMG GT3 Evo	+5 Laps	290	0 (9)
17	GT3-Am	27	(United States) Heart of Racing by SPS	(United States) Hannah Grisham (United Kingdom) Ian James (United States) Gray Newell (Canada) Zacharie Robichon	Mercedes-AMG M159 6.2 L V8	+5 Laps	290	0 (9)
18	GT3-Pro Am	81	(United States) Era Motorsport	(United Kingdom) Oliver Bryant (United Kingdom) Ryan Dalziel (United Kingdom) Jake Hill (United States) Dwight Merriman (United Kingdom) Kyle Tilley	Ferrari 296 GT3	+7 Laps	288	0 (12)
18	GT3-Pro Am	81	(United States) Era Motorsport	(United Kingdom) Oliver Bryant (United Kingdom) Ryan Dalziel (United Kingdom) Jake Hill (United States) Dwight Merriman (United Kingdom) Kyle Tilley	Ferrari F163 3.0 L Turbo V6	+7 Laps	288	0 (12)
19	GT3-Pro Am	19	(Netherlands) MP Motorsport	(Netherlands) Bert de Heus (Netherlands) Daniël de Jong (Netherlands) Henk de Jong (Netherlands) Jaap van Lagen	Mercedes-AMG GT3 Evo	+8 Laps	287	0 (10)
19	GT3-Pro Am	19	(Netherlands) MP Motorsport	(Netherlands) Bert de Heus (Netherlands) Daniël de Jong (Netherlands) Henk de Jong (Netherlands) Jaap van Lagen	Mercedes-AMG M159 6.2 L V8	+8 Laps	287	0 (10)
20	GT3-Pro Am	88	(United Arab Emirates) Dragon Racing	(United States) Matt Bell (United States) Dustin Blattner (United States) Patrick Liddy (United States) Blake McDonald	Ferrari 296 GT3	+8 Laps	287	0 (9)
20	GT3-Pro Am	88	(United Arab Emirates) Dragon Racing	(United States) Matt Bell (United States) Dustin Blattner (United States) Patrick Liddy (United States) Blake McDonald	Ferrari F163 3.0 L Turbo V6	+8 Laps	287	0 (9)
21	GT3-Pro Am	969	(Germany) Proton Huber Competition	(Finland) Jukka Honkavuori (Finland) Jani Käkelä (United Arab Emirates) Bashar Mardini (Dominican Republic) Joel Monegro (Finland) Kalle Rovanperä	Porsche 911 GT3 R (992)	+8 Laps	287	0 (8)
21	GT3-Pro Am	969	(Germany) Proton Huber Competition	(Finland) Jukka Honkavuori (Finland) Jani Käkelä (United Arab Emirates) Bashar Mardini (Dominican Republic) Joel Monegro (Finland) Kalle Rovanperä	Porsche M97/80 4.2 L Flat-6	+8 Laps	287	0 (8)
22	GT3-Pro Am	77	(Australia) Earl Bamber Motorsport	(New Zealand) Earl Bamber (Indonesia) Setiawan Santoso (Thailand) Munkong Sathienthirakul (Thailand) Tanart Sathienthirakul	Aston Martin Vantage AMR GT3 Evo	+9 Laps	286	0 (7)
22	GT3-Pro Am	77	(Australia) Earl Bamber Motorsport	(New Zealand) Earl Bamber (Indonesia) Setiawan Santoso (Thailand) Munkong Sathienthirakul (Thailand) Tanart Sathienthirakul	Aston Martin M177 4.0 L Twin-Turbo V8	+9 Laps	286	0 (7)
23	**992**	**909**	**(Netherlands) Red Camel-Jordans.nl**	**(Netherlands) Ivo Breukers (Netherlands) Luc Breukers (Netherlands) Rik Breukers (Switzerland) Fabian Danz**	**Porsche 992 GT3 Cup**	**+9 Laps**	**286**	**20**
23	**992**	**909**	**(Netherlands) Red Camel-Jordans.nl**	**(Netherlands) Ivo Breukers (Netherlands) Luc Breukers (Netherlands) Rik Breukers (Switzerland) Fabian Danz**	**Porsche 4.0 L Flat-6**	**+9 Laps**	**286**	**20**
24	GT3-Am	20	(Germany) Huber Motorsport	(China) Liang Jiatong (United States) Robert Mau (United States) Jon Miller (Germany) Hans Wehrmann	Porsche 911 GT3 R (992)	+9 Laps	286	0 (8)
24	GT3-Am	20	(Germany) Huber Motorsport	(China) Liang Jiatong (United States) Robert Mau (United States) Jon Miller (Germany) Hans Wehrmann	Porsche M97/80 4.2 L Flat-6	+9 Laps	286	0 (8)
25	992	912	(Netherlands) Tierra Outdoor Racing by Hans Weijs Motorsport	(Netherlands) Huub van Eijndhoven (Netherlands) Lucas van Eijndhoven (Netherlands) Jop Rappange (Netherlands) Ralph Poppelaars	Porsche 992 GT3 Cup	+10 Laps	285	18
25	992	912	(Netherlands) Tierra Outdoor Racing by Hans Weijs Motorsport	(Netherlands) Huub van Eijndhoven (Netherlands) Lucas van Eijndhoven (Netherlands) Jop Rappange (Netherlands) Ralph Poppelaars	Porsche 4.0 L Flat-6	+10 Laps	285	18
26	992	901	(India) Ajith Kumar Racing by Bas Koeten Racing	(Belgium) Fabian Duffieux (Belgium) Mathieu Detry (India) Ajith Kumar (Australia) Cameron McLeod	Porsche 992 GT3 Cup	+11 Laps	284	16
26	992	901	(India) Ajith Kumar Racing by Bas Koeten Racing	(Belgium) Fabian Duffieux (Belgium) Mathieu Detry (India) Ajith Kumar (Australia) Cameron McLeod	Porsche 4.0 L Flat-6	+11 Laps	284	16
27	GT3-Pro Am	56	(Czech Republic) Scuderia Praha	(Czech Republic) Josef Král (Slovakia) Matúš Výboh (Slovakia) Miroslav Výboh (Czech Republic) Dennis Waszek	Ferrari 296 GT3	+12 Laps	283	0 (6)
27	GT3-Pro Am	56	(Czech Republic) Scuderia Praha	(Czech Republic) Josef Král (Slovakia) Matúš Výboh (Slovakia) Miroslav Výboh (Czech Republic) Dennis Waszek	Ferrari F163 3.0 L Turbo V6	+12 Laps	283	0 (6)
28	**992-Am**	**974**	**(Qatar) QMMF by HRT**	**(Qatar) Ibrahim Al-Abdulghani (Qatar) Abdulla Ali Al-Khelaifi (Qatar) Ghanim Ali Al Maadheed (Germany) Julian Hanses**	**Porsche 992 GT3 Cup**	**+13 Laps**	**282**	**14 (20)**
28	**992-Am**	**974**	**(Qatar) QMMF by HRT**	**(Qatar) Ibrahim Al-Abdulghani (Qatar) Abdulla Ali Al-Khelaifi (Qatar) Ghanim Ali Al Maadheed (Germany) Julian Hanses**	**Porsche 4.0 L Flat-6**	**+13 Laps**	**282**	**14 (20)**
29	992-Am	888	(France) SebLajoux Racing	(France) Mathys Jaubert (France) Sebastien Lajoux (Belgium) Alexandre Leroy (France) Stephane Perrin (France) Louis Perrot	Porsche 992 GT3 Cup	+13 Laps	282	12 (18)
29	992-Am	888	(France) SebLajoux Racing	(France) Mathys Jaubert (France) Sebastien Lajoux (Belgium) Alexandre Leroy (France) Stephane Perrin (France) Louis Perrot	Porsche 4.0 L Flat-6	+13 Laps	282	12 (18)
30	992-Am	911	(France) TFT Racing	(France) Jordan Boisson (France) Jérôme Boullery (France) Patrick Charlaix (Belgium) Benjamin Paque	Porsche 992 GT3 Cup	+14 Laps	281	10 (16)
30	992-Am	911	(France) TFT Racing	(France) Jordan Boisson (France) Jérôme Boullery (France) Patrick Charlaix (Belgium) Benjamin Paque	Porsche 4.0 L Flat-6	+14 Laps	281	10 (16)
31	GT3-Am	96	GWR Australia	(Australia) Brett Hobson (Australia) Justin Mcmillan (Australia) Michael Sheargold (Australia) Garth Walden (Australia) Glen Wood	Mercedes-AMG GT3 Evo	+15 Laps	280	0 (7)
31	GT3-Am	96	GWR Australia	(Australia) Brett Hobson (Australia) Justin Mcmillan (Australia) Michael Sheargold (Australia) Garth Walden (Australia) Glen Wood	Mercedes-AMG M159 6.2 L V8	+15 Laps	280	0 (7)
32	992	917	(Italy) Fulgenzi Racing	(Italy) Enrico Fulgenzi (United Arab Emirates) Alessandro Giannone (Italy) Andrea Girondi (Netherlands) Sam Jongejan	Porsche 992 GT3 Cup	+15 Laps	280	9
32	992	917	(Italy) Fulgenzi Racing	(Italy) Enrico Fulgenzi (United Arab Emirates) Alessandro Giannone (Italy) Andrea Girondi (Netherlands) Sam Jongejan	Porsche 4.0 L Flat-6	+15 Laps	280	9
33	992	938	(France) GP Racing Team	(France) Victor Bernier (France) Enzo Joulié (France) Gabriel Pemeant (France) Loïc Teire	Porsche 992 GT3 Cup	+16 Laps	279	8
33	992	938	(France) GP Racing Team	(France) Victor Bernier (France) Enzo Joulié (France) Gabriel Pemeant (France) Loïc Teire	Porsche 4.0 L Flat-6	+16 Laps	279	8
34	992-Am	918	(Belgium) Mühlner Motorsport	(Germany) Ben Bünnagel; Alexey Denisov (Estonia) Martin Rump (United States) Bryan Sircely	Porsche 992 GT3 Cup	+16 Laps	279	7 (14)
34	992-Am	918	(Belgium) Mühlner Motorsport	(Germany) Ben Bünnagel; Alexey Denisov (Estonia) Martin Rump (United States) Bryan Sircely	Porsche 4.0 L Flat-6	+16 Laps	279	7 (14)
35	**GTX**	**710**	**(Germany) Leipert Motorsport**	**(Switzerland) "Takis" (New Zealand) Brendon Leitch (China) JJ Song (United States) Gerhard Watzinger (United States) Don Yount**	**Lamborghini Huracán Super Trofeo Evo 2**	**+17 Laps**	**278**	**20**
35	**GTX**	**710**	**(Germany) Leipert Motorsport**	**(Switzerland) "Takis" (New Zealand) Brendon Leitch (China) JJ Song (United States) Gerhard Watzinger (United States) Don Yount**	**Lamborghini 5.2 L V10**	**+17 Laps**	**278**	**20**
36	992	989	(Japan) Seven × Seven Racing	(Japan) "Bankcy" (Japan) Kiyoto Fujinami (Japan) Tsubasa Kondo (Japan) Taichi Watarai	Porsche 992 GT3 Cup	+17 Laps	278	6
36	992	989	(Japan) Seven × Seven Racing	(Japan) "Bankcy" (Japan) Kiyoto Fujinami (Japan) Tsubasa Kondo (Japan) Taichi Watarai	Porsche 4.0 L Flat-6	+17 Laps	278	6
37	992-Am	971	(United Arab Emirates) RABDAN by Fulgenzi Racing	(United Arab Emirates) Saif Alameri (United Arab Emirates) Salem Alketbi (United Arab Emirates) Fahad Alzaabi (Austria) Christopher Zöchling	Porsche 992 GT3 Cup	+17 Laps	278	5 (12)
37	992-Am	971	(United Arab Emirates) RABDAN by Fulgenzi Racing	(United Arab Emirates) Saif Alameri (United Arab Emirates) Salem Alketbi (United Arab Emirates) Fahad Alzaabi (Austria) Christopher Zöchling	Porsche 4.0 L Flat-6	+17 Laps	278	5 (12)
38	992	950	(United Arab Emirates) Duel Racing by Huber	(United Kingdom) Phil Keen (United Arab Emirates) Nabil Moutran (United Arab Emirates) Ramzi Moutran (United Arab Emirates) Sami Moutran (Germany) Theo Oeverhaus	Porsche 992 GT3 Cup	+17 Laps	278	4
38	992	950	(United Arab Emirates) Duel Racing by Huber	(United Kingdom) Phil Keen (United Arab Emirates) Nabil Moutran (United Arab Emirates) Ramzi Moutran (United Arab Emirates) Sami Moutran (Germany) Theo Oeverhaus	Porsche 4.0 L Flat-6	+17 Laps	278	4
39	992-Am	928	(Germany) HRT Performance	(France) Stéphane Adler (France) Michael Blanchemain (France) Jérôme da Costa (France) Franck Eburderie (France) Franck Lavergne	Porsche 992 GT3 Cup	+18 Laps	277	3 (10)
39	992-Am	928	(Germany) HRT Performance	(France) Stéphane Adler (France) Michael Blanchemain (France) Jérôme da Costa (France) Franck Eburderie (France) Franck Lavergne	Porsche 4.0 L Flat-6	+18 Laps	277	3 (10)
40	992-Am	929	(Germany) HRT Performance	(France) Sylvain Caroff (France) Julien Jacquel (France) Jean Michel Marie (Germany) Alex Renner (France) Vincent Roche	Porsche 992 GT3 Cup	+18 Laps	277	2 (9)
40	992-Am	929	(Germany) HRT Performance	(France) Sylvain Caroff (France) Julien Jacquel (France) Jean Michel Marie (Germany) Alex Renner (France) Vincent Roche	Porsche 4.0 L Flat-6	+18 Laps	277	2 (9)
41	GT3-Am	69	(United Arab Emirates) Continental Racing with Simpson Motorsport	(Montenegro) Alim Geshev; Mikhail Loboda; David Pogosyan (Kyrgyzstan) Andrey Solukovtsev (Cyprus) Vasily Vladykin	Audi R8 LMS Evo II	+18 Laps	277	0 (6)
41	GT3-Am	69	(United Arab Emirates) Continental Racing with Simpson Motorsport	(Montenegro) Alim Geshev; Mikhail Loboda; David Pogosyan (Kyrgyzstan) Andrey Solukovtsev (Cyprus) Vasily Vladykin	Audi DAR 5.2 L V10	+18 Laps	277	0 (6)
42	992-Am	930	(Germany) HRT Performance	(Germany) Holger Harmsen (United States) Gregg Gorski (Germany) Marlon Menden (Switzerland) Silvain Pastoris	Porsche 992 GT3 Cup	+19 Laps	276	1 (8)
42	992-Am	930	(Germany) HRT Performance	(Germany) Holger Harmsen (United States) Gregg Gorski (Germany) Marlon Menden (Switzerland) Silvain Pastoris	Porsche 4.0 L Flat-6	+19 Laps	276	1 (8)
43	992-Am	992	(France) SebLajoux Racing	(Kazakhstan) Alexandr Artemyev (Netherlands) Paul Meijer (France) Lauris Nauroy (France) Louis Perrot (France) Lucas Sugliano	Porsche 992 GT3 Cup	+21 Laps	274	0 (7)
43	992-Am	992	(France) SebLajoux Racing	(Kazakhstan) Alexandr Artemyev (Netherlands) Paul Meijer (France) Lauris Nauroy (France) Louis Perrot (France) Lucas Sugliano	Porsche 4.0 L Flat-6	+21 Laps	274	0 (7)
44	GT3-Pro Am	30	(Germany) Car Collection Motorsport	(Switzerland) Alex Fontana (Slovenia) Matej Knez (Armenia) Roman Mavlanov; Victor Plekhanov; Damir Saitov	Porsche 911 GT3 R (992)	+22 Laps	273	0 (5)
44	GT3-Pro Am	30	(Germany) Car Collection Motorsport	(Switzerland) Alex Fontana (Slovenia) Matej Knez (Armenia) Roman Mavlanov; Victor Plekhanov; Damir Saitov	Porsche M97/80 4.2 L Flat-6	+22 Laps	273	0 (5)
45	**GT4**	**495**	**(France) Team CMR**	**(France) Nico Prost (United Kingdom) Mike Simpson (United Kingdom) Freddie Tomlinson (United Kingdom) Lawrence Tomlinson**	**Ginetta G56 GT4 Evo**	**+27 Laps**	**268**	**12**
45	**GT4**	**495**	**(France) Team CMR**	**(France) Nico Prost (United Kingdom) Mike Simpson (United Kingdom) Freddie Tomlinson (United Kingdom) Lawrence Tomlinson**	**GM LS3 6.2 L V8**	**+27 Laps**	**268**	**12**
46	GTX	701	(France) Vortex V8	(France) Lionel Amrouche (France) Solenn Amrouche (France) Philippe Bonnel (France) Gilles Courtois	Vortex 2.0	+27 Laps	268	18
46	GTX	701	(France) Vortex V8	(France) Lionel Amrouche (France) Solenn Amrouche (France) Philippe Bonnel (France) Gilles Courtois	Chevrolet LS3 6.2 L V8	+27 Laps	268	18
47	GTX	111	(Australia) 111 Racing	(Australia) Jake Camilleri (Australia) Darren Currie (Australia) Grant Donaldson (Australia) Mark Griffith	IRC GT	+28 Laps	267	16
47	GTX	111	(Australia) 111 Racing	(Australia) Jake Camilleri (Australia) Darren Currie (Australia) Grant Donaldson (Australia) Mark Griffith	GM LS3 6.2 L V8	+28 Laps	267	16
48	992	914	(Austria) Razoon – More Than Racing	(Poland) Artur Chwist (Denmark) Simon Birch (Austria) Daniel Drexel (Armenia) Ivan Ekelchik	Porsche 992 GT3 Cup	+34 Laps	261	0
48	992	914	(Austria) Razoon – More Than Racing	(Poland) Artur Chwist (Denmark) Simon Birch (Austria) Daniel Drexel (Armenia) Ivan Ekelchik	Porsche 4.0 L Flat-6	+34 Laps	261	0
49	GT4	438	(United Kingdom) AGMC Racing by Simpson Motorsport	(Canada) Ramez Azzam (United Kingdom) Tim Docker (United States) Tiger Tari (Ghana) William Tewiah (Romania) Tudor Tudurachi	BMW M4 GT4 Gen II	+34 Laps	261	18
49	GT4	438	(United Kingdom) AGMC Racing by Simpson Motorsport	(Canada) Ramez Azzam (United Kingdom) Tim Docker (United States) Tiger Tari (Ghana) William Tewiah (Romania) Tudor Tudurachi	BMW S58B30T0 3.0 L Twin Turbo I6	+34 Laps	261	18
50	GT4	427	(Germany) SRS Team Sorg Rennsport	(Switzerland) Gero Bauknecht (Sweden) Tommy Gråberg (United Kingdom) Harley Haughton (United States) Arthur Simondet	Porsche 718 Cayman GT4 RS Clubsport	+37 Laps	258	16
50	GT4	427	(Germany) SRS Team Sorg Rennsport	(Switzerland) Gero Bauknecht (Sweden) Tommy Gråberg (United Kingdom) Harley Haughton (United States) Arthur Simondet	Porsche MDG 4.0 L Flat-6	+37 Laps	258	16
51	GT4	496	(United Arab Emirates) Continental TTR Racing	Viktor Agafonov; Marat Gubaydullin; Dimitry Levin; Konstantin Mandrikov	Toyota GR Supra GT4 Evo	+37 Laps	258	14
51	GT4	496	(United Arab Emirates) Continental TTR Racing	Viktor Agafonov; Marat Gubaydullin; Dimitry Levin; Konstantin Mandrikov	BMW B58B30 3.0 L Twin-Turbo I6	+37 Laps	258	14
52	992-Am	978	(Belgium) Speed Lover	(Belgium) Stienes Longin (Belgium) Wim Meulders (Belgium) Gilles Renmans (Belgium) Rik Renmans (Belgium) John de Wilde	Porsche 992 GT3 Cup	+44 Laps	251	0 (6)
52	992-Am	978	(Belgium) Speed Lover	(Belgium) Stienes Longin (Belgium) Wim Meulders (Belgium) Gilles Renmans (Belgium) Rik Renmans (Belgium) John de Wilde	Porsche 4.0 L Flat-6	+44 Laps	251	0 (6)
53	**TCX**	**101**	**(Germany) asBest Racing**	**(Switzerland) Thomas Alpiger (United Arab Emirates) Mohammed Al Owais (Germany) Christian Ladurner (Germany) Pia Ohlsson (United Arab Emirates) Nadir Zuhour**	**SEAT León Cup Racer**	**+144 Laps**	**251**	**20**
53	**TCX**	**101**	**(Germany) asBest Racing**	**(Switzerland) Thomas Alpiger (United Arab Emirates) Mohammed Al Owais (Germany) Christian Ladurner (Germany) Pia Ohlsson (United Arab Emirates) Nadir Zuhour**	**Volkswagen EA888 2.0 L I4**	**+144 Laps**	**251**	**20**
54	GTX	795	(France) Team CMR	(France) Erwin Creed (France) Ethan Gialdini (Belgium) Rodolphe Gillion (France) Hugo Mogica (France) Eric Mouez	Ginetta G56 GTX	+65 Laps	230	10
54	GTX	795	(France) Team CMR	(France) Erwin Creed (France) Ethan Gialdini (Belgium) Rodolphe Gillion (France) Hugo Mogica (France) Eric Mouez	GM LS3 6.2 L V8	+65 Laps	230	10
55 DNF	TCX	102	(Germany) asBest Racing	(India) Akshay Gupta (Germany) Lutz Obermann (Sweden) Henrik Sandell (Japan) Junichi Umemoto (United Arab Emirates) Nadir Zuhour	Cupra León TCR	+66 Laps	229	18
55 DNF	TCX	102	(Germany) asBest Racing	(India) Akshay Gupta (Germany) Lutz Obermann (Sweden) Henrik Sandell (Japan) Junichi Umemoto (United Arab Emirates) Nadir Zuhour	Volkswagen EA888 2.0 L I4	+66 Laps	229	18
56 DNF	TCX	127	(Germany) SRS Team Sorg Rennsport	(France) Thierry Chkondali (Japan) Yasuhiro Misashi (Japan) Yutaka Seki (Mexico) Benito Tagle	Porsche 718 Cayman GT4 Clubsport	Crash	211	16
56 DNF	TCX	127	(Germany) SRS Team Sorg Rennsport	(France) Thierry Chkondali (Japan) Yasuhiro Misashi (Japan) Yutaka Seki (Mexico) Benito Tagle	Porsche 4.0 L Flat-6	Crash	211	16
57 DNF	GT4	470	(Germany) WS Racing	(Netherlands) Jeroen Bleekemolen (Netherlands) Emely de Heus (United States) Keith Gatehouse (United Kingdom) George King (United States) Tim Pappas	BMW M4 GT4 Gen II	Fire	178	12
57 DNF	GT4	470	(Germany) WS Racing	(Netherlands) Jeroen Bleekemolen (Netherlands) Emely de Heus (United States) Keith Gatehouse (United Kingdom) George King (United States) Tim Pappas	BMW S58B30T0 3.0 L Twin Turbo I6	Fire	178	12
58	GT4	414	(Austria) Razoon – More Than Racing	(India) Ajith Kumar (Austria) Leo Pichler (Austria) Dominik Olbert	Porsche 718 Cayman GT4 RS Clubsport	+137 Laps	158	10
58	GT4	414	(Austria) Razoon – More Than Racing	(India) Ajith Kumar (Austria) Leo Pichler (Austria) Dominik Olbert	Porsche MDG 4.0 L Flat-6	+137 Laps	158	10
DNF	GT3-Am	31	(United Kingdom) Team Parker Racing	(United Kingdom) Robert Huff (United Kingdom) Max Lynn (United Kingdom) Shaun Lynn (United Kingdom) Scott Malvern	Bentley Continental GT3	Mechanical	131	0 (0)
DNF	GT3-Am	31	(United Kingdom) Team Parker Racing	(United Kingdom) Robert Huff (United Kingdom) Max Lynn (United Kingdom) Shaun Lynn (United Kingdom) Scott Malvern	Bentley 4.0 L Turbo V8	Mechanical	131	0 (0)
NC	GTX	797	(Switzerland) Graff Racing	(Cyprus) Evgeny Kireev; Nikita Mazepin (United Kingdom) Harrison Newey; Roman Rusinov	Rossa LM GT	Not Classified	52	0
NC	GTX	797	(Switzerland) Graff Racing	(Cyprus) Evgeny Kireev; Nikita Mazepin (United Kingdom) Harrison Newey; Roman Rusinov	Audi DAR 5.2 L V10	Not Classified	52	0
DNF	GT3-Am	5	(Germany) Team Motopark	(Mexico) Sebastián Álvarez (France) Frédéric Jousset (Netherlands) Lin Hodenius (Hungary) Levente Révész (Netherlands) Thierry Vermeulen	Mercedes-AMG GT3 Evo	Crash	48	0 (0)
DNF	GT3-Am	5	(Germany) Team Motopark	(Mexico) Sebastián Álvarez (France) Frédéric Jousset (Netherlands) Lin Hodenius (Hungary) Levente Révész (Netherlands) Thierry Vermeulen	Mercedes-AMG M159 6.2 L V8	Crash	48	0 (0)
DNF	992-Am	990	(Japan) JBR	(Japan) Yasutaka Ando (Japan) Taku Bamba (Japan) Kiwamu Katayama (Japan) Norikazu Shibata (United Kingdom) David Tan	Porsche 992 GT3 Cup	Crash	40	0 (0)
DNF	992-Am	990	(Japan) JBR	(Japan) Yasutaka Ando (Japan) Taku Bamba (Japan) Kiwamu Katayama (Japan) Norikazu Shibata (United Kingdom) David Tan	Porsche 4.0 L Flat-6	Crash	40	0 (0)
DNS	GT3-Pro	41	(Belgium) Comtoyou Racing	(Belgium) Nicolas Baert; Viacheslav Gutak (Netherlands) Mex Jansen (Netherlands) Dante Rappange	Aston Martin Vantage AMR GT3 Evo	Did Not Start	0	0
DNS	GT3-Pro	41	(Belgium) Comtoyou Racing	(Belgium) Nicolas Baert; Viacheslav Gutak (Netherlands) Mex Jansen (Netherlands) Dante Rappange	Aston Martin M177 4.0 L Twin-Turbo V8	Did Not Start	0	0
DNS	GT3-Pro	99	(Germany) Tresor Attempto Racing	(Germany) Alex Aka (China) Yi Deng (Germany) Dennis Marschall (Italy) Lorenzo Patrese (China) Mike Zhou	Audi R8 LMS Evo II	Crash in Qualifying	0	0
DNS	GT3-Pro	99	(Germany) Tresor Attempto Racing	(Germany) Alex Aka (China) Yi Deng (Germany) Dennis Marschall (Italy) Lorenzo Patrese (China) Mike Zhou	Audi DAR 5.2 L V10	Crash in Qualifying	0	0

=== Final result ===
Class winner in bold.

Pos	Class	No.	Team	Drivers	Chassis	Time/Reason	Laps	Points
Pos	Class	No.	Team	Drivers	Engine	Time/Reason	Laps	Points
1	**GT3-Pro**	**777**	**(Belgium) AlManar Racing by Team WRT**	**(Oman) Al Faisal Al Zubair (United Kingdom) Dan Harper (Germany) Max Hesse (United Kingdom) Darren Leung (United Kingdom) Ben Tuck**	**BMW M4 GT3 Evo**	**24:00:41.664**	**589**	**20**
1	**GT3-Pro**	**777**	**(Belgium) AlManar Racing by Team WRT**	**(Oman) Al Faisal Al Zubair (United Kingdom) Dan Harper (Germany) Max Hesse (United Kingdom) Darren Leung (United Kingdom) Ben Tuck**	**BMW S58B30T0 3.0 L Turbo I6**	**24:00:41.664**	**589**	**20**
2	GT3-Pro	92	(Lithuania) Pure Rxcing	(United Kingdom) Harry King (United Kingdom) Alex Malykhin; Alexey Nesov (Austria) Thomas Preining	Porsche 911 GT3 R (992)	+1 Lap	588	18
2	GT3-Pro	92	(Lithuania) Pure Rxcing	(United Kingdom) Harry King (United Kingdom) Alex Malykhin; Alexey Nesov (Austria) Thomas Preining	Porsche M97/80 4.2 L Flat-6	+1 Lap	588	18
3	GT3-Pro	24	(Italy) Dinamic GT	(Austria) Klaus Bachler (Denmark) Anders Fjordbach (Netherlands) Loek Hartog (Germany) Thomas Kiefer (Kyrgyzstan) Stanislav Minsky	Porsche 911 GT3 R (992)	+1 Lap	588	16
3	GT3-Pro	24	(Italy) Dinamic GT	(Austria) Klaus Bachler (Denmark) Anders Fjordbach (Netherlands) Loek Hartog (Germany) Thomas Kiefer (Kyrgyzstan) Stanislav Minsky	Porsche M97/80 4.2 L Flat-6	+1 Lap	588	16
4	GT3-Pro	7	(Germany) SMP Racing	Vitaly Petrov; Dennis Remenyako; Sergey Sirotkin (Kyrgyzstan) Kirill Smal; Alexander Smolyar	Mercedes-AMG GT3 Evo	+3 Laps	586	14
4	GT3-Pro	7	(Germany) SMP Racing	Vitaly Petrov; Dennis Remenyako; Sergey Sirotkin (Kyrgyzstan) Kirill Smal; Alexander Smolyar	Mercedes-AMG M159 6.2 L V8	+3 Laps	586	14
5	**GT3-Am**	**991**	**(United Kingdom) Paradine Competition**	**(Oman) Ahmad Al Harthy (United Kingdom) Darren Leung (United Kingdom) Toby Sowery (United Kingdom) Simon Traves**	**BMW M4 GT3 Evo**	**+3 Laps**	**586**	**12 (20)**
5	**GT3-Am**	**991**	**(United Kingdom) Paradine Competition**	**(Oman) Ahmad Al Harthy (United Kingdom) Darren Leung (United Kingdom) Toby Sowery (United Kingdom) Simon Traves**	**BMW S58B30T0 3.0 L Turbo I6**	**+3 Laps**	**586**	**12 (20)**
6	GT3-Am	80	(Germany) Herberth Motorsport	(Hong Kong) Antares Au (Hong Kong) Jonathan Hui (Macau) Kevin Tse (Hong Kong) Frank Yu	Porsche 911 GT3 R (992)	+5 Laps	584	10 (18)
6	GT3-Am	80	(Germany) Herberth Motorsport	(Hong Kong) Antares Au (Hong Kong) Jonathan Hui (Macau) Kevin Tse (Hong Kong) Frank Yu	Porsche M97/80 4.2 L Flat-6	+5 Laps	584	10 (18)
7	**GT3-Pro Am**	**91**	**(Germany) Herberth Motorsport**	**(Netherlands) Kay van Berlo (Germany) Ralf Bohn (United States) Jake Pedersen (Germany) Alfred Renauer (Germany) Robert Renauer**	**Porsche 911 GT3 R (992)**	**+6 Laps**	**583**	**9 (20)**
7	**GT3-Pro Am**	**91**	**(Germany) Herberth Motorsport**	**(Netherlands) Kay van Berlo (Germany) Ralf Bohn (United States) Jake Pedersen (Germany) Alfred Renauer (Germany) Robert Renauer**	**Porsche M97/80 4.2 L Flat-6**	**+6 Laps**	**583**	**9 (20)**
8	GT3-Am	21	(Antigua and Barbuda) HAAS RT	(United Arab Emirates) Alexander Bukhantsov (Belgium) Peter Guelinckx (Belgium) Bert Longin (United Kingdom) James Winslow	Audi R8 LMS Evo II	+6 Laps	583	8 (16)
8	GT3-Am	21	(Antigua and Barbuda) HAAS RT	(United Arab Emirates) Alexander Bukhantsov (Belgium) Peter Guelinckx (Belgium) Bert Longin (United Kingdom) James Winslow	Audi DAR 5.2 L V10	+6 Laps	583	8 (16)
9	GT3-Pro	1	(United Arab Emirates) Manamauri Energy by Ebimotors	(Italy) Fabrizio Broggi (Italy) Sabino de Castro (Romania) Sergiu Nicolae (Switzerland) Patric Niederhauser	Porsche 911 GT3 R (992)	+6 Laps	583	7
9	GT3-Pro	1	(United Arab Emirates) Manamauri Energy by Ebimotors	(Italy) Fabrizio Broggi (Italy) Sabino de Castro (Romania) Sergiu Nicolae (Switzerland) Patric Niederhauser	Porsche M97/80 4.2 L Flat-6	+6 Laps	583	7
10	GT3-Am	27	(United States) Heart of Racing by SPS	(United States) Hannah Grisham (United Kingdom) Ian James (United States) Gray Newell (Canada) Zacharie Robichon	Mercedes-AMG GT3 Evo	+6 Laps	583	6 (14)
10	GT3-Am	27	(United States) Heart of Racing by SPS	(United States) Hannah Grisham (United Kingdom) Ian James (United States) Gray Newell (Canada) Zacharie Robichon	Mercedes-AMG M159 6.2 L V8	+6 Laps	583	6 (14)
11	GT3-Pro Am	16	(Germany) Winward Racing	(Italy) Gabriele Piana; Rinat Salikhov; Viktor Shaytar; Sergey Stolyarov	Mercedes-AMG GT3 Evo	+6 Laps	583	5 (18)
11	GT3-Pro Am	16	(Germany) Winward Racing	(Italy) Gabriele Piana; Rinat Salikhov; Viktor Shaytar; Sergey Stolyarov	Mercedes-AMG M159 6.2 L V8	+6 Laps	583	5 (18)
12	GT3-Am	269	(Germany) Herberth Motorsport	(Germany) Christoph Breuer (Germany) Vincent Kolb (Germany) Max Moritz (Germany) Florian Spengler	Porsche 911 GT3 R (992)	+9 Laps	580	4 (12)
12	GT3-Am	269	(Germany) Herberth Motorsport	(Germany) Christoph Breuer (Germany) Vincent Kolb (Germany) Max Moritz (Germany) Florian Spengler	Porsche M97/80 4.2 L Flat-6	+9 Laps	580	4 (12)
13	GT3-Pro Am	88	(United Arab Emirates) Dragon Racing	(United States) Matt Bell (United States) Dustin Blattner (United States) Patrick Liddy (United States) Blake McDonald	Ferrari 296 GT3	+12 Laps	577	3 (16)
13	GT3-Pro Am	88	(United Arab Emirates) Dragon Racing	(United States) Matt Bell (United States) Dustin Blattner (United States) Patrick Liddy (United States) Blake McDonald	Ferrari F163 3.0 L Turbo V6	+12 Laps	577	3 (16)
14	GT3-Pro Am	8	(South Africa) Into Africa Racing by Dragon Racing	(United Kingdom) Jason Ambrose (Republic of Ireland) Matt Griffin (India) Zaamin Jaffer (Zimbabwe) Axcil Jefferies (South Africa) Xollie Letlaka	Ferrari 296 GT3	+12 Laps	577	2 (14)
14	GT3-Pro Am	8	(South Africa) Into Africa Racing by Dragon Racing	(United Kingdom) Jason Ambrose (Republic of Ireland) Matt Griffin (India) Zaamin Jaffer (Zimbabwe) Axcil Jefferies (South Africa) Xollie Letlaka	Ferrari F163 3.0 L Turbo V6	+12 Laps	577	2 (14)
15	GT3-Am	4	(Germany) Haupt Racing Team	(France) Romain Andriolo (Germany) Hubert Haupt (Saudi Arabia) Reema Juffali (Germany) Salman Owega	Mercedes-AMG GT3 Evo	+14 Laps	575	1 (10)
15	GT3-Am	4	(Germany) Haupt Racing Team	(France) Romain Andriolo (Germany) Hubert Haupt (Saudi Arabia) Reema Juffali (Germany) Salman Owega	Mercedes-AMG M159 6.2 L V8	+14 Laps	575	1 (10)
16	GT3-Am	20	(Germany) Huber Motorsport	(China) Liang Jiatong (United States) Robert Mau (United States) Jon Miller (Germany) Hans Wehrmann	Porsche 911 GT3 R (992)	+14 Laps	575	0 (9)
16	GT3-Am	20	(Germany) Huber Motorsport	(China) Liang Jiatong (United States) Robert Mau (United States) Jon Miller (Germany) Hans Wehrmann	Porsche M97/80 4.2 L Flat-6	+14 Laps	575	0 (9)
17	GT3-Pro Am	969	(Germany) Proton Huber Competition	(Finland) Jukka Honkavuori (Finland) Jani Käkelä (United Arab Emirates) Bashar Mardini (Dominican Republic) Joel Monegro (Finland) Kalle Rovanperä	Porsche 911 GT3 R (992)	+15 Laps	574	0 (12)
17	GT3-Pro Am	969	(Germany) Proton Huber Competition	(Finland) Jukka Honkavuori (Finland) Jani Käkelä (United Arab Emirates) Bashar Mardini (Dominican Republic) Joel Monegro (Finland) Kalle Rovanperä	Porsche M97/80 4.2 L Flat-6	+15 Laps	574	0 (12)
18	GT3-Pro Am	77	(Australia) Earl Bamber Motorsport	(New Zealand) Earl Bamber (Indonesia) Setiawan Santoso (Thailand) Munkong Sathienthirakul (Thailand) Tanart Sathienthirakul	Aston Martin Vantage AMR GT3 Evo	+16 Laps	573	0 (10)
18	GT3-Pro Am	77	(Australia) Earl Bamber Motorsport	(New Zealand) Earl Bamber (Indonesia) Setiawan Santoso (Thailand) Munkong Sathienthirakul (Thailand) Tanart Sathienthirakul	Aston Martin M177 4.0 L Twin-Turbo V8	+16 Laps	573	0 (10)
19	GT3-Pro Am	19	(Netherlands) MP Motorsport	(Netherlands) Bert de Heus (Netherlands) Daniël de Jong (Netherlands) Henk de Jong (Netherlands) Jaap van Lagen	Mercedes-AMG GT3 Evo	+16 Laps	573	0 (9)
19	GT3-Pro Am	19	(Netherlands) MP Motorsport	(Netherlands) Bert de Heus (Netherlands) Daniël de Jong (Netherlands) Henk de Jong (Netherlands) Jaap van Lagen	Mercedes-AMG M159 6.2 L V8	+16 Laps	573	0 (9)
20	**992**	**909**	**(Netherlands) Red Camel-Jordans.nl**	**(Netherlands) Ivo Breukers (Netherlands) Luc Breukers (Netherlands) Rik Breukers (Switzerland) Fabian Danz**	**Porsche 992 GT3 Cup**	**+18 Laps**	**571**	**20**
20	**992**	**909**	**(Netherlands) Red Camel-Jordans.nl**	**(Netherlands) Ivo Breukers (Netherlands) Luc Breukers (Netherlands) Rik Breukers (Switzerland) Fabian Danz**	**Porsche 4.0 L Flat-6**	**+18 Laps**	**571**	**20**
21	GT3-Pro Am	40	(Belgium) Comtoyou Racing	(United Arab Emirates) Jamie Day (Belgium) Matisse Lismont (Belgium) Kobe Pauwels (Belgium) Tom Van Rompuy	Aston Martin Vantage AMR GT3 Evo	+18 Laps	571	0 (8)
21	GT3-Pro Am	40	(Belgium) Comtoyou Racing	(United Arab Emirates) Jamie Day (Belgium) Matisse Lismont (Belgium) Kobe Pauwels (Belgium) Tom Van Rompuy	Aston Martin M177 4.0 L Twin-Turbo V8	+18 Laps	571	0 (8)
22	992	912	(Netherlands) Tierra Outdoor Racing by Hans Weijs Motorsport	(Netherlands) Huub van Eijndhoven (Netherlands) Lucas van Eijndhoven (Netherlands) Jop Rappange (Netherlands) Ralph Poppelaars	Porsche 992 GT3 Cup	+18 Laps	571	18
22	992	912	(Netherlands) Tierra Outdoor Racing by Hans Weijs Motorsport	(Netherlands) Huub van Eijndhoven (Netherlands) Lucas van Eijndhoven (Netherlands) Jop Rappange (Netherlands) Ralph Poppelaars	Porsche 4.0 L Flat-6	+18 Laps	571	18
23	992	901	(India) Ajith Kumar Racing by Bas Koeten Racing	(Belgium) Fabian Duffieux (Belgium) Mathieu Detry (India) Ajith Kumar (Australia) Cameron McLeod	Porsche 992 GT3 Cup	+21 Laps	568	16
23	992	901	(India) Ajith Kumar Racing by Bas Koeten Racing	(Belgium) Fabian Duffieux (Belgium) Mathieu Detry (India) Ajith Kumar (Australia) Cameron McLeod	Porsche 4.0 L Flat-6	+21 Laps	568	16
24	**992-Am**	**974**	**(Qatar) QMMF by HRT**	**(Qatar) Ibrahim Al-Abdulghani (Qatar) Abdulla Ali Al-Khelaifi (Qatar) Ghanim Ali Al Maadheed (Germany) Julian Hanses**	**Porsche 992 GT3 Cup**	**+22 Laps**	**567**	**14 (20)**
24	**992-Am**	**974**	**(Qatar) QMMF by HRT**	**(Qatar) Ibrahim Al-Abdulghani (Qatar) Abdulla Ali Al-Khelaifi (Qatar) Ghanim Ali Al Maadheed (Germany) Julian Hanses**	**Porsche 4.0 L Flat-6**	**+22 Laps**	**567**	**14 (20)**
25	992-Am	911	(France) TFT Racing	(France) Jordan Boisson (France) Jérôme Boullery (France) Patrick Charlaix (Belgium) Benjamin Paque	Porsche 992 GT3 Cup	+22 Laps	567	12 (18)
25	992-Am	911	(France) TFT Racing	(France) Jordan Boisson (France) Jérôme Boullery (France) Patrick Charlaix (Belgium) Benjamin Paque	Porsche 4.0 L Flat-6	+22 Laps	567	12 (18)
26	992	938	(France) GP Racing Team	(France) Victor Bernier (France) Enzo Joulié (France) Gabriel Pemeant (France) Loïc Teire	Porsche 992 GT3 Cup	+26 Laps	563	10
26	992	938	(France) GP Racing Team	(France) Victor Bernier (France) Enzo Joulié (France) Gabriel Pemeant (France) Loïc Teire	Porsche 4.0 L Flat-6	+26 Laps	563	10
27	992-Am	971	(United Arab Emirates) RABDAN by Fulgenzi Racing	(United Arab Emirates) Saif Alameri (United Arab Emirates) Salem Alketbi (United Arab Emirates) Fahad Alzaabi (Austria) Christopher Zöchling	Porsche 992 GT3 Cup	+28 Laps	561	9 (16)
27	992-Am	971	(United Arab Emirates) RABDAN by Fulgenzi Racing	(United Arab Emirates) Saif Alameri (United Arab Emirates) Salem Alketbi (United Arab Emirates) Fahad Alzaabi (Austria) Christopher Zöchling	Porsche 4.0 L Flat-6	+28 Laps	561	9 (16)
28	992	950	(United Arab Emirates) Duel Racing by Huber	(United Kingdom) Phil Keen (United Arab Emirates) Nabil Moutran (United Arab Emirates) Ramzi Moutran (United Arab Emirates) Sami Moutran (Germany) Theo Oeverhaus	Porsche 992 GT3 Cup	+31 Laps	558	8
28	992	950	(United Arab Emirates) Duel Racing by Huber	(United Kingdom) Phil Keen (United Arab Emirates) Nabil Moutran (United Arab Emirates) Ramzi Moutran (United Arab Emirates) Sami Moutran (Germany) Theo Oeverhaus	Porsche 4.0 L Flat-6	+31 Laps	558	8
29	992-Am	929	(Germany) HRT Performance	(France) Sylvain Caroff (France) Julien Jacquel (France) Jean Michel Marie (Germany) Alex Renner (France) Vincent Roche	Porsche 992 GT3 Cup	+35 Laps	554	7 (14)
29	992-Am	929	(Germany) HRT Performance	(France) Sylvain Caroff (France) Julien Jacquel (France) Jean Michel Marie (Germany) Alex Renner (France) Vincent Roche	Porsche 4.0 L Flat-6	+35 Laps	554	7 (14)
30	GT3-Am	96	GWR Australia	(Australia) Brett Hobson (Australia) Justin Mcmillan (Australia) Michael Sheargold (Australia) Garth Walden (Australia) Glen Wood	Mercedes-AMG GT3 Evo	+36 Laps	553	0 (8)
30	GT3-Am	96	GWR Australia	(Australia) Brett Hobson (Australia) Justin Mcmillan (Australia) Michael Sheargold (Australia) Garth Walden (Australia) Glen Wood	Mercedes-AMG M159 6.2 L V8	+36 Laps	553	0 (8)
31	992-Am	928	(Germany) HRT Performance	(France) Stéphane Adler (France) Michael Blanchemain (France) Jérôme da Costa (France) Franck Eburderie (France) Franck Lavergne	Porsche 992 GT3 Cup	+38 Laps	551	6 (12)
31	992-Am	928	(Germany) HRT Performance	(France) Stéphane Adler (France) Michael Blanchemain (France) Jérôme da Costa (France) Franck Eburderie (France) Franck Lavergne	Porsche 4.0 L Flat-6	+38 Laps	551	6 (12)
32	992	917	(Italy) Fulgenzi Racing	(Italy) Enrico Fulgenzi (United Arab Emirates) Alessandro Giannone (Italy) Andrea Girondi (Netherlands) Sam Jongejan	Porsche 992 GT3 Cup	+38 Laps	551	5
32	992	917	(Italy) Fulgenzi Racing	(Italy) Enrico Fulgenzi (United Arab Emirates) Alessandro Giannone (Italy) Andrea Girondi (Netherlands) Sam Jongejan	Porsche 4.0 L Flat-6	+38 Laps	551	5
33	**GTX**	**710**	**(Germany) Leipert Motorsport**	**(Switzerland) "Takis" (New Zealand) Brendon Leitch (China) JJ Song (United States) Gerhard Watzinger (United States) Don Yount**	**Lamborghini Huracán Super Trofeo Evo 2**	**+47 Laps**	**542**	**20**
33	**GTX**	**710**	**(Germany) Leipert Motorsport**	**(Switzerland) "Takis" (New Zealand) Brendon Leitch (China) JJ Song (United States) Gerhard Watzinger (United States) Don Yount**	**Lamborghini 5.2 L V10**	**+47 Laps**	**542**	**20**
34	992	989	(Japan) Seven × Seven Racing	(Japan) "Bankcy" (Japan) Kiyoto Fujinami (Japan) Tsubasa Kondo (Japan) Taichi Watarai	Porsche 992 GT3 Cup	+53 Laps	536	4
34	992	989	(Japan) Seven × Seven Racing	(Japan) "Bankcy" (Japan) Kiyoto Fujinami (Japan) Tsubasa Kondo (Japan) Taichi Watarai	Porsche 4.0 L Flat-6	+53 Laps	536	4
35	992-Am	930	(Germany) HRT Performance	(Germany) Holger Harmsen (United States) Gregg Gorski (Germany) Marlon Menden (Switzerland) Silvain Pastoris	Porsche 992 GT3 Cup	+60 Laps	529	3 (10)
35	992-Am	930	(Germany) HRT Performance	(Germany) Holger Harmsen (United States) Gregg Gorski (Germany) Marlon Menden (Switzerland) Silvain Pastoris	Porsche 4.0 L Flat-6	+60 Laps	529	3 (10)
36	992-Am	918	(Belgium) Mühlner Motorsport	(Germany) Ben Bünnagel; Alexey Denisov (Estonia) Martin Rump (United States) Bryan Sircely	Porsche 992 GT3 Cup	+61 Laps	528	2 (9)
36	992-Am	918	(Belgium) Mühlner Motorsport	(Germany) Ben Bünnagel; Alexey Denisov (Estonia) Martin Rump (United States) Bryan Sircely	Porsche 4.0 L Flat-6	+61 Laps	528	2 (9)
37	**GT4**	**438**	**(United Kingdom) AGMC Racing by Simpson Motorsport**	**(Canada) Ramez Azzam (United Kingdom) Tim Docker (United States) Tiger Tari (Ghana) William Tewiah (Romania) Tudor Tudurachi**	**BMW M4 GT4 Gen II**	**+66 Laps**	**523**	**20**
37	**GT4**	**438**	**(United Kingdom) AGMC Racing by Simpson Motorsport**	**(Canada) Ramez Azzam (United Kingdom) Tim Docker (United States) Tiger Tari (Ghana) William Tewiah (Romania) Tudor Tudurachi**	**BMW S58B30T0 3.0 L Twin Turbo I6**	**+66 Laps**	**523**	**20**
38	GT3-Pro Am	56	(Czech Republic) Scuderia Praha	(Czech Republic) Josef Král (Slovakia) Matúš Výboh (Slovakia) Miroslav Výboh (Czech Republic) Dennis Waszek	Ferrari 296 GT3	+68 Laps	521	0 (7)
38	GT3-Pro Am	56	(Czech Republic) Scuderia Praha	(Czech Republic) Josef Král (Slovakia) Matúš Výboh (Slovakia) Miroslav Výboh (Czech Republic) Dennis Waszek	Ferrari F163 3.0 L Turbo V6	+68 Laps	521	0 (7)
39	GT4	427	(Germany) SRS Team Sorg Rennsport	(Switzerland) Gero Bauknecht (Sweden) Tommy Gråberg (United Kingdom) Harley Haughton (United States) Arthur Simondet	Porsche 718 Cayman GT4 RS Clubsport	+71 Laps	518	18
39	GT4	427	(Germany) SRS Team Sorg Rennsport	(Switzerland) Gero Bauknecht (Sweden) Tommy Gråberg (United Kingdom) Harley Haughton (United States) Arthur Simondet	Porsche MDG 4.0 L Flat-6	+71 Laps	518	18
40	992-Am	992	(France) SebLajoux Racing	(Kazakhstan) Alexandr Artemyev (Netherlands) Paul Meijer (France) Lauris Nauroy (France) Louis Perrot (France) Lucas Sugliano	Porsche 992 GT3 Cup	Crash	551	1 (8)
40	992-Am	992	(France) SebLajoux Racing	(Kazakhstan) Alexandr Artemyev (Netherlands) Paul Meijer (France) Lauris Nauroy (France) Louis Perrot (France) Lucas Sugliano	Porsche 4.0 L Flat-6	Crash	551	1 (8)
41	GT4	496	(United Arab Emirates) Continental TTR Racing	Viktor Agafonov; Marat Gubaydullin; Dimitry Levin; Konstantin Mandrikov	Toyota GR Supra GT4 Evo	+78 Laps	511	16
41	GT4	496	(United Arab Emirates) Continental TTR Racing	Viktor Agafonov; Marat Gubaydullin; Dimitry Levin; Konstantin Mandrikov	BMW B58B30 3.0 L Twin-Turbo I6	+78 Laps	511	16
42	GTX	111	(Australia) 111 Racing	(Australia) Jake Camilleri (Australia) Darren Currie (Australia) Grant Donaldson (Australia) Mark Griffith	IRC GT	+84 Laps	505	18
42	GTX	111	(Australia) 111 Racing	(Australia) Jake Camilleri (Australia) Darren Currie (Australia) Grant Donaldson (Australia) Mark Griffith	GM LS3 6.2 L V8	+84 Laps	505	18
43 DNF	GT3-Pro Am	30	(Germany) Car Collection Motorsport	(Switzerland) Alex Fontana (Slovenia) Matej Knez (Armenia) Roman Mavlanov; Victor Plekhanov; Damir Saitov	Porsche 911 GT3 R (992)	Crash	495	0 (6)
43 DNF	GT3-Pro Am	30	(Germany) Car Collection Motorsport	(Switzerland) Alex Fontana (Slovenia) Matej Knez (Armenia) Roman Mavlanov; Victor Plekhanov; Damir Saitov	Porsche M97/80 4.2 L Flat-6	Crash	495	0 (6)
44 DNF	GT3-Pro Am	81	(United States) Era Motorsport	(United Kingdom) Oliver Bryant (United Kingdom) Ryan Dalziel (United Kingdom) Jake Hill (United States) Dwight Merriman (United Kingdom) Kyle Tilley	Ferrari 296 GT3	Crash	487	0 (5)
44 DNF	GT3-Pro Am	81	(United States) Era Motorsport	(United Kingdom) Oliver Bryant (United Kingdom) Ryan Dalziel (United Kingdom) Jake Hill (United States) Dwight Merriman (United Kingdom) Kyle Tilley	Ferrari F163 3.0 L Turbo V6	Crash	487	0 (5)
45	GT3-Pro	33	(United Kingdom) Optimum Motorsport	(Denmark) Benjamin Goethe (United Kingdom) Tom Ikin (United Kingdom) Mikey Porter (United Kingdom) Morgan Tillbrook	McLaren 720S GT3 Evo	+107 Laps	482	0
45	GT3-Pro	33	(United Kingdom) Optimum Motorsport	(Denmark) Benjamin Goethe (United Kingdom) Tom Ikin (United Kingdom) Mikey Porter (United Kingdom) Morgan Tillbrook	McLaren M840T 4.0 L Turbo V8	+107 Laps	482	0
46	992-Am	978	(Belgium) Speed Lover	(Belgium) Stienes Longin (Belgium) Wim Meulders (Belgium) Gilles Renmans (Belgium) Rik Renmans (Belgium) John de Wilde	Porsche 992 GT3 Cup	Retired	480	0 (7)
46	992-Am	978	(Belgium) Speed Lover	(Belgium) Stienes Longin (Belgium) Wim Meulders (Belgium) Gilles Renmans (Belgium) Rik Renmans (Belgium) John de Wilde	Porsche 4.0 L Flat-6	Retired	480	0 (7)
47	**TCX**	**101**	**(Germany) asBest Racing**	**(Switzerland) Thomas Alpiger (United Arab Emirates) Mohammed Al Owais (Germany) Christian Ladurner (Germany) Pia Ohlsson (United Arab Emirates) Nadir Zuhour**	**SEAT León Cup Racer**	**+135 Laps**	**454**	**20**
47	**TCX**	**101**	**(Germany) asBest Racing**	**(Switzerland) Thomas Alpiger (United Arab Emirates) Mohammed Al Owais (Germany) Christian Ladurner (Germany) Pia Ohlsson (United Arab Emirates) Nadir Zuhour**	**Volkswagen EA888 2.0 L I4**	**+135 Laps**	**454**	**20**
48	992	914	(Austria) Razoon – More Than Racing	(Poland) Artur Chwist (Denmark) Simon Birch (Austria) Daniel Drexel (Armenia) Ivan Ekelchik	Porsche 992 GT3 Cup	+145 Laps	444	0
48	992	914	(Austria) Razoon – More Than Racing	(Poland) Artur Chwist (Denmark) Simon Birch (Austria) Daniel Drexel (Armenia) Ivan Ekelchik	Porsche 4.0 L Flat-6	+145 Laps	444	0
49 DNF	GT3-Am	69	(United Arab Emirates) Continental Racing with Simpson Motorsport	(Montenegro) Alim Geshev; Mikhail Loboda; David Pogosyan (Kyrgyzstan) Andrey Solukovtsev (Cyprus) Vasily Vladykin	Audi R8 LMS Evo II	Transmission	417	0 (7)
49 DNF	GT3-Am	69	(United Arab Emirates) Continental Racing with Simpson Motorsport	(Montenegro) Alim Geshev; Mikhail Loboda; David Pogosyan (Kyrgyzstan) Andrey Solukovtsev (Cyprus) Vasily Vladykin	Audi DAR 5.2 L V10	Transmission	417	0 (7)
50	GT4	414	(Austria) Razoon – More Than Racing	(India) Ajith Kumar (Austria) Leo Pichler (Austria) Dominik Olbert	Porsche 718 Cayman GT4 RS Clubsport	+187 Laps	402	14
50	GT4	414	(Austria) Razoon – More Than Racing	(India) Ajith Kumar (Austria) Leo Pichler (Austria) Dominik Olbert	Porsche MDG 4.0 L Flat-6	+187 Laps	402	14
51 DNF	GTX	701	(France) Vortex V8	(France) Lionel Amrouche (France) Solenn Amrouche (France) Philippe Bonnel (France) Gilles Courtois	Vortex 2.0	Gearbox	391	16
51 DNF	GTX	701	(France) Vortex V8	(France) Lionel Amrouche (France) Solenn Amrouche (France) Philippe Bonnel (France) Gilles Courtois	Chevrolet LS3 6.2 L V8	Gearbox	391	16
52 DNF	GT3-Am	11	(Switzerland) Hofor Racing	(Switzerland) Michael Kroll (Switzerland) Alexander Prinz (Switzerland) Chantal Prinz (Germany) Timo Rumpfkeil (Germany) Carsten Tilke	Mercedes-AMG GT3	Crash	382	0 (6)
52 DNF	GT3-Am	11	(Switzerland) Hofor Racing	(Switzerland) Michael Kroll (Switzerland) Alexander Prinz (Switzerland) Chantal Prinz (Germany) Timo Rumpfkeil (Germany) Carsten Tilke	Mercedes-AMG M159 6.2 L V8	Crash	382	0 (6)
53	TCX	102	(Germany) asBest Racing	(India) Akshay Gupta (Germany) Lutz Obermann (Sweden) Henrik Sandell (Japan) Junichi Umemoto (United Arab Emirates) Nadir Zuhour	Cupra León TCR	+212 Laps	377	18
53	TCX	102	(Germany) asBest Racing	(India) Akshay Gupta (Germany) Lutz Obermann (Sweden) Henrik Sandell (Japan) Junichi Umemoto (United Arab Emirates) Nadir Zuhour	Volkswagen EA888 2.0 L I4	+212 Laps	377	18
54 DNF	992-Am	888	(France) SebLajoux Racing	(France) Mathys Jaubert (France) Sebastien Lajoux (Belgium) Alexandre Leroy (France) Stephane Perrin (France) Louis Perrot	Porsche 992 GT3 Cup	Gearbox	374	0 (6)
54 DNF	992-Am	888	(France) SebLajoux Racing	(France) Mathys Jaubert (France) Sebastien Lajoux (Belgium) Alexandre Leroy (France) Stephane Perrin (France) Louis Perrot	Porsche 4.0 L Flat-6	Gearbox	374	0 (6)
55 DNF	GT4	495	(France) Team CMR	(France) Nico Prost (United Kingdom) Mike Simpson (United Kingdom) Freddie Tomlinson (United Kingdom) Lawrence Tomlinson	Ginetta G56 GT4 Evo	Fire	309	12
55 DNF	GT4	495	(France) Team CMR	(France) Nico Prost (United Kingdom) Mike Simpson (United Kingdom) Freddie Tomlinson (United Kingdom) Lawrence Tomlinson	GM LS3 6.2 L V8	Fire	309	12
56 DNF	GTX	795	(France) Team CMR	(France) Erwin Creed (France) Ethan Gialdini (Belgium) Rodolphe Gillion (France) Hugo Mogica (France) Eric Mouez	Ginetta G56 GTX	Electrics	281	14
56 DNF	GTX	795	(France) Team CMR	(France) Erwin Creed (France) Ethan Gialdini (Belgium) Rodolphe Gillion (France) Hugo Mogica (France) Eric Mouez	GM LS3 6.2 L V8	Electrics	281	14
DNF	TCX	127	(Germany) SRS Team Sorg Rennsport	(France) Thierry Chkondali (Japan) Yasuhiro Misashi (Japan) Yutaka Seki (Mexico) Benito Tagle	Porsche 718 Cayman GT4 Clubsport	Crash	211	0
DNF	TCX	127	(Germany) SRS Team Sorg Rennsport	(France) Thierry Chkondali (Japan) Yasuhiro Misashi (Japan) Yutaka Seki (Mexico) Benito Tagle	Porsche 4.0 L Flat-6	Crash	211	0
DNF	GT4	470	(Germany) WS Racing	(Netherlands) Jeroen Bleekemolen (Netherlands) Emely de Heus (United States) Keith Gatehouse (United Kingdom) George King (United States) Tim Pappas	BMW M4 GT4 Gen II	Fire	178	0
DNF	GT4	470	(Germany) WS Racing	(Netherlands) Jeroen Bleekemolen (Netherlands) Emely de Heus (United States) Keith Gatehouse (United Kingdom) George King (United States) Tim Pappas	BMW S58B30T0 3.0 L Twin Turbo I6	Fire	178	0
DNF	GT3-Am	31	(United Kingdom) Team Parker Racing	(United Kingdom) Robert Huff (United Kingdom) Max Lynn (United Kingdom) Shaun Lynn (United Kingdom) Scott Malvern	Bentley Continental GT3	Mechanical	131	0 (0)
DNF	GT3-Am	31	(United Kingdom) Team Parker Racing	(United Kingdom) Robert Huff (United Kingdom) Max Lynn (United Kingdom) Shaun Lynn (United Kingdom) Scott Malvern	Bentley 4.0 L Turbo V8	Mechanical	131	0 (0)
NC	GTX	797	(Switzerland) Graff Racing	(Cyprus) Evgeny Kireev; Nikita Mazepin (United Kingdom) Harrison Newey; Roman Rusinov	Rossa LM GT	Not Classified	75	0
NC	GTX	797	(Switzerland) Graff Racing	(Cyprus) Evgeny Kireev; Nikita Mazepin (United Kingdom) Harrison Newey; Roman Rusinov	Audi DAR 5.2 L V10	Not Classified	75	0
DNF	GT3-Am	5	(Germany) Team Motopark	(Mexico) Sebastián Álvarez (France) Frédéric Jousset (Netherlands) Lin Hodenius (Hungary) Levente Révész (Netherlands) Thierry Vermeulen	Mercedes-AMG GT3 Evo	Crash	48	0 (0)
DNF	GT3-Am	5	(Germany) Team Motopark	(Mexico) Sebastián Álvarez (France) Frédéric Jousset (Netherlands) Lin Hodenius (Hungary) Levente Révész (Netherlands) Thierry Vermeulen	Mercedes-AMG M159 6.2 L V8	Crash	48	0 (0)
DNF	992-Am	990	(Japan) JBR	(Japan) Yasutaka Ando (Japan) Taku Bamba (Japan) Kiwamu Katayama (Japan) Norikazu Shibata (United Kingdom) David Tan	Porsche 992 GT3 Cup	Crash	40	0 (0)
DNF	992-Am	990	(Japan) JBR	(Japan) Yasutaka Ando (Japan) Taku Bamba (Japan) Kiwamu Katayama (Japan) Norikazu Shibata (United Kingdom) David Tan	Porsche 4.0 L Flat-6	Crash	40	0 (0)
DNS	GT3-Pro	41	(Belgium) Comtoyou Racing	(Belgium) Nicolas Baert; Viacheslav Gutak (Netherlands) Mex Jansen (Netherlands) Dante Rappange	Aston Martin Vantage AMR GT3 Evo	Did Not Start	0	0
DNS	GT3-Pro	41	(Belgium) Comtoyou Racing	(Belgium) Nicolas Baert; Viacheslav Gutak (Netherlands) Mex Jansen (Netherlands) Dante Rappange	Aston Martin M177 4.0 L Twin-Turbo V8	Did Not Start	0	0
DNS	GT3-Pro	99	(Germany) Tresor Attempto Racing	(Germany) Alex Aka (China) Yi Deng (Germany) Dennis Marschall (Italy) Lorenzo Patrese (China) Mike Zhou	Audi R8 LMS Evo II	Crash in Qualifying	0	0
DNS	GT3-Pro	99	(Germany) Tresor Attempto Racing	(Germany) Alex Aka (China) Yi Deng (Germany) Dennis Marschall (Italy) Lorenzo Patrese (China) Mike Zhou	Audi DAR 5.2 L V10	Crash in Qualifying	0	0

== Notes ==
Middle East Trophy
Previous race: none	2025 season	Next race: 6 Hours of Abu Dhabi
