= 2025–26 Porsche Carrera Cup Middle East =

Motorsport series

The 2025–26 Porsche Carrera Cup Middle East was the 3rd season of the Porsche Carrera Cup Middle East. The season began at Bahrain International Circuit on 7 November and finished at Yas Marina Circuit on 1 February.

== Teams and drivers ==
Team	No.	Driver	Class	Rounds
(Bulgaria) Splendid Racing	1	(Bulgaria) Alexandra Vateva	P R	All
(Saudi Arabia) Saudi Racing	3	(Saudi Arabia) Saud Al Saud	P	All
(Saudi Arabia) Saudi Racing	23	(Saudi Arabia) Khaled Alahmadi	P	All
(Australia) BeMe Racing	7	(Australia) Joshua Berry	P R	3–4
(Sweden) Mtech Competition	9	(Norway) Alexander Hagen Berg	P R	1
(Sweden) Mtech Competition	9	(Sweden) Kjelle Lejonkrans	PA	2
(Sweden) Mtech Competition	9	(United Kingdom) James Wallis	P R	3–4
(Sweden) Mtech Competition	10	(Sweden) Krister Andero	M	All
(Netherlands) Team GP Elite	13	(Australia) Sam Shahin	PA	1–3
(Netherlands) Team GP Elite	33	(Netherlands) Niels Koolen	P	2
(Netherlands) Team GP Elite	42	(France) Cedric Chassang	PA	All
(Bahrain) DHL-Team	14	(Australia) Caleb Sumich	P R	All
(Italy) Intercable Racing	16	(Germany) Max Mutschlechner	P R	All
(Canada) M3L Team	17	(Canada) Mark J. Thomas	M	All
(United Arab Emirates) Baron Motorsport	37	(Lebanon) Rawad Sarieddine	M	4
(Japan) Seven x Seven Racing	66	(Japan) "Bankcy"	PA	1–3
(Japan) Seven x Seven Racing	66	(Netherlands) Robert de Haan	P	4
(Japan) Seven x Seven Racing	77	(Japan) Taichi Watarai	P R	All
(Serbia) Flaner Racing	74	(Serbia) Nikola Petrović	M	3–4
(Czech Republic) GT Sports Technology	85	(Czech Republic) Petr Brecka	M	All
(Qatar) QMMF	96	(Qatar) Abdulla Al-Khelaifi	P	2

Icon	Class
P	Pro Cup
PA	Pro-Am Cup
M	Masters Cup
R	Rookie
	Guest Starter

== Calendar ==
Round	Circuit	Date	Supporting	Map of circuit locations
2025				2025–26 Porsche Carrera Cup Middle East is located in Middle East
1	Bahrain International Circuit, Sakhir, Bahrain	8–9 November	FIA World Endurance Championship	2025–26 Porsche Carrera Cup Middle East is located in Middle East
2	Lusail International Circuit, Lusail, Qatar	28–30 November	Formula One World Championship; Formula 2 Championship	2025–26 Porsche Carrera Cup Middle East is located in Middle East
2026				2025–26 Porsche Carrera Cup Middle East is located in Middle East
3	Dubai Autodrome, Dubai, United Arab Emirates	24–25 January	None	2025–26 Porsche Carrera Cup Middle East is located in Middle East
4	Yas Marina Circuit, Abu Dhabi, United Arab Emirates	31 January–1 February	None	2025–26 Porsche Carrera Cup Middle East is located in Middle East
C (Note: Cancelled due to the Iran War.)	~~Bahrain International Circuit, Sakhir, Bahrain~~	~~10–12 April~~	~~Formula One World Championship~~; ~~FIA Formula 2 Championship~~; ~~FIA Formula 3 Championship~~	2025–26 Porsche Carrera Cup Middle East is located in Middle East
C	~~Jeddah Corniche Circuit, Jeddah, Saudi Arabia~~	~~17–19 April~~	~~Formula One World Championship~~; ~~FIA Formula 2 Championship~~; ~~F1 Academy~~	2025–26 Porsche Carrera Cup Middle East is located in Middle East

== Results ==
Round		Circuit	Pole position	Overall winner	Pro-Am winner	Masters winner
1	R1	Bahrain International Circuit	(Japan) Taichi Watarai	(Japan) Taichi Watarai	(Japan) "Bankcy"	(Czech Republic) Petr Brecka
1	R2	Bahrain International Circuit	(Japan) Taichi Watarai	(Japan) Taichi Watarai	(France) Cedric Chassang	(Sweden) Krister Andero
2	R3	(Qatar) Lusail International Circuit	(Japan) Taichi Watarai	(Australia) Caleb Sumich	(France) Cedric Chassang	(Czech Republic) Petr Brecka
2	R4	(Qatar) Lusail International Circuit	(Japan) Taichi Watarai	(Japan) Taichi Watarai	(France) Cedric Chassang	(Sweden) Krister Andero
3	R5	(United Arab Emirates) Dubai Autodrome	(Japan) Taichi Watarai	(United Kingdom) James Wallis	(France) Cedric Chassang	(Sweden) Krister Andero
3	R6	(United Arab Emirates) Dubai Autodrome	(Australia) Caleb Sumich	(Australia) Caleb Sumich (Note: James Wallis was the first driver to cross the finish line, but received two time penalties amounting to a total of 10 seconds for separate infringements. Caleb Sumich, who was the second driver to cross the finish line, thus inherited the win.)	(France) Cedric Chassang	(Canada) Mark J. Thomas
4	R7	(United Arab Emirates) Yas Marina Circuit	(Netherlands) Robert de Haan	(Netherlands) Robert de Haan	(France) Cedric Chassang	(Czech Republic) Petr Brecka
4	R8	(United Arab Emirates) Yas Marina Circuit	(Netherlands) Robert de Haan	(Netherlands) Robert de Haan	(France) Cedric Chassang	(Sweden) Krister Andero

== Championship standings ==
=== Scoring system ===
Position	**1st**	**2nd**	**3rd**	**4th**	**5th**	**6th**	**7th**	**8th**	**9th**	**10th**	**11th**	**12th**	**13th**	**14th**	**15th**
Points	25	20	17	14	12	10	9	8	7	6	5	4	3	2	1

=== Overall ===
Pos	Driver	Team	BHR1 (Bahrain)		LUS (Note: Half points were awarded in the second race of round two as huge crash saw the race stopped after just two laps.) (Qatar)		DUB (United Arab Emirates)		YAS (United Arab Emirates)		Pts
Pos	Driver	Team	R1	R2	R3	R4	R5	R6	R7	R8	Pts
1	(Japan) Taichi Watarai	(Japan) Seven x Seven Racing	**1**	**1**	**2**	**1**	**7**	10	2	2	138.5
2	(Australia) Caleb Sumich	(Bahrain) DHL-Team	4	Ret	1	2	2	**1**	4	3	125
3	(Saudi Arabia) Khaled Alahmadi	(Saudi Arabia) Saudi Racing	5	3	4	3	3	2	3	5	117.5
4	(Saudi Arabia) Saud Al Saud	(Saudi Arabia) Saudi Racing	6	8	5	6	4	3	5	6	88
5	(France) Cedric Chassang	(Netherlands) Team GP Elite	7	2	8	8	6	6	7	8	79.5
6	(Bulgaria) Alexandra Vateva	(Bulgaria) Splendid Racing	Ret	4	6	5	5	7	6	4	75
7	(Germany) Max Mutschlechner	(Italy) Intercable Racing	8	6	10	9	8	4	8	7	68
8	(Netherlands) Robert de Haan	(Japan) Seven x Seven Racing							**1**	**1**	50
9	(Japan) "Bankcy"	(Japan) Seven x Seven Racing	2	9	11	11	9	11			49
10	(Australia) Sam Shahin	(Netherlands) Team GP Elite	3	5	9	10	WD	WD			40.5
11	(Sweden) Krister Andero	(Sweden) Mtech Competition	11	10	14	13	10	13	11	10	37
12	(Canada) Mark J. Thomas	(Canada) M3L Team	12	12	15	14	13	8	12	11	31.5
13	(Australia) Joshua Berry	(Australia) BeMe Racing					11	5	9	9	31
14	(Czech Republic) Petr Brecka	(Czech Republic) GT Sports Technology	9	11	13	15	12	Ret	10	12	31
15	(United Kingdom) James Wallis	(Sweden) Mtech Competition					1	12	DNS	DNS	30
16	(Qatar) Abdulla Al-Khelaifi	(Qatar) QMMF			3	4					24
17	(Norway) Alexander Hagen Berg	(Sweden) Mtech Competition	10	7							15
18	(Sweden) Kjelle Lejonkrans	(Sweden) Mtech Competition			12	12					7.5
Guest drivers ineligible to score points
—	(Netherlands) Niels Koolen	(Netherlands) Team GP Elite			7	7					–
—	(Serbia) Nikola Petrović	(Serbia) Flaner Racing					14	9	14	Ret	–
—	(Lebanon) Rawad Sarieddine	(United Arab Emirates) Baron Motorsport							13	DNS	–
Pos	Driver	Team	BHR1 (Bahrain)		LUS (Qatar)		DUB (United Arab Emirates)		YAS (United Arab Emirates)		Pts

Colour	Result
Gold	Winner
Silver	Second place
Bronze	Third place
Green	Points classification
Blue	Non-points classification
Blue	Non-classified finish (NC)
Purple	Retired, not classified (Ret)
Red	Did not qualify (DNQ)
Red	Did not pre-qualify (DNPQ)
Black	Disqualified (DSQ)
White	Did not start (DNS)
White	Withdrew (WD)
White	Race cancelled (C)
Blank	Did not practice (DNP)
Blank	Did not arrive (DNA)
Blank	Excluded (EX)

**Bold** – Pole

Italics – Fastest Lap

Rookie

=== Pro Am ===
Pos	Driver	Team	BHR1 (Bahrain)		LUS (Qatar)		DUB (United Arab Emirates)		YAS (United Arab Emirates)		Pts
Pos	Driver	Team	R1	R2	R3	R4	R5	R6	R7	R8	Pts
1	(France) Cedric Chassang	(Netherlands) Team GP Elite	3	1	1	1	1	1	1	1	179.5
2	(Japan) "Bankcy"	(Japan) Seven x Seven Racing	1	3	3	3	2	2			107.5
3	(Australia) Sam Shahin	(Netherlands) Team GP Elite	2	2	2	2	WD	WD			70
4	(Sweden) Kjelle Lejonkrans	(Sweden) Mtech Competition			4	4					21
Pos	Driver	Team	BHR1 (Bahrain)		LUS (Qatar)		DUB (United Arab Emirates)		YAS (United Arab Emirates)		Pts

=== Masters ===
Pos	Driver	Team	BHR1 (Bahrain)		LUS (Qatar)		DUB (United Arab Emirates)		YAS (United Arab Emirates)		Pts
Pos	Driver	Team	R1	R2	R3	R4	R5	R6	R7	R8	Pts
1	(Sweden) Krister Andero	(Sweden) Mtech Competition	2	1	2	1	1	3	2	1	167.5
2	(Czech Republic) Petr Brecka	(Czech Republic) GT Sports Technology	1	2	1	3	2	Ret	1	3	140.5
3	(Canada) Mark J. Thomas	(Canada) M3L Team	3	3	3	2	3	1	3	2	140
Guest drivers ineligible to score points
—	(Serbia) Nikola Petrović	(Serbia) Flaner Racing					4	2	5	Ret	–
—	(Lebanon) Rawad Sarieddine	(United Arab Emirates) Baron Motorsport							4	DNS	–
Pos	Driver	Team	BHR1 (Bahrain)		LUS (Qatar)		DUB (United Arab Emirates)		YAS (United Arab Emirates)		Pts

=== Dealer Trophy ===
Pos	Team	Pts
1	(Japan) Seven x Seven Racing	237.5
2	(Saudi Arabia) Saudi Racing	205.5
3	(Netherlands) Team GP Elite	118
4	(Sweden) Mtech Competition	89.5
