= 2025 Porsche Carrera Cup Japan =

One-make motor racing season in Japan

The 2025 Porsche Carrera Cup Japan was the twenty-fourth season of the Porsche Carrera Cup Japan. The season commenced on 6 April at the Suzuka Circuit, and will concluded at Fuji Speedway on 27 September.

== Calendar ==
Round		Circuit	Date	Supporting	Circuit locations
1	R1	(Mie Prefecture) Suzuka Circuit, Suzuka	5–6 April	Formula One World Championship (Japanese Grand Prix); Ferrari Challenge Japan	2025 Porsche Carrera Cup Japan is located in Japan
1	R2	(Mie Prefecture) Suzuka Circuit, Suzuka	5–6 April	Formula One World Championship (Japanese Grand Prix); Ferrari Challenge Japan	2025 Porsche Carrera Cup Japan is located in Japan
2	R1	(Okayama Prefecture) Okayama International Circuit, Mimasaka	24–25 May	Formula Regional Japanese Championship; Okayama Challenge Cup Race	2025 Porsche Carrera Cup Japan is located in Japan
2	R2	(Okayama Prefecture) Okayama International Circuit, Mimasaka	24–25 May	Formula Regional Japanese Championship; Okayama Challenge Cup Race	2025 Porsche Carrera Cup Japan is located in Japan
2	R3	(Okayama Prefecture) Okayama International Circuit, Mimasaka	24–25 May	Formula Regional Japanese Championship; Okayama Challenge Cup Race	2025 Porsche Carrera Cup Japan is located in Japan
3	R1	(Shizuoka Prefecture) Fuji Speedway, Oyama	19–20 July	Super Formula Championship; Kyojo Cup	2025 Porsche Carrera Cup Japan is located in Japan
3	R2	(Shizuoka Prefecture) Fuji Speedway, Oyama	19–20 July	Super Formula Championship; Kyojo Cup	2025 Porsche Carrera Cup Japan is located in Japan
4	R1	(Miyagi Prefecture) Sportsland Sugo, Murata	9–10 August	Super Formula Championship; Honda N-One Owner's Cup	2025 Porsche Carrera Cup Japan is located in Japan
4	R2	(Miyagi Prefecture) Sportsland Sugo, Murata	9–10 August	Super Formula Championship; Honda N-One Owner's Cup	2025 Porsche Carrera Cup Japan is located in Japan
5	R1	(Shizuoka Prefecture) Fuji Speedway, Oyama	26–27 September	FIA World Endurance Championship (6 Hours of Fuji); Formula Regional Japanese Championship	2025 Porsche Carrera Cup Japan is located in Japan
5	R2	(Shizuoka Prefecture) Fuji Speedway, Oyama	26–27 September	FIA World Endurance Championship (6 Hours of Fuji); Formula Regional Japanese Championship	2025 Porsche Carrera Cup Japan is located in Japan

== Entry list ==
Team	No.	Driver	Class	Rounds
(Japan) Hyper Water Racing	7	(Japan) Kazuhisa Urabe	P	All
(Japan) Hyper Water Racing	17	(Japan) "Ikeda"	Am	All
(Japan) / Bingo Racing (Note: Car No. 9 & No. 88 entered as Bingo Racing, and No. 60 entered as Showa Auto with Bingo Racing); (Japan) / Showa Auto with Bingo Racing	9	(Japan) Shinji Takei	PA	1
(Japan) / Bingo Racing; (Japan) / Showa Auto with Bingo Racing	60	(Japan) Reimei Ito	P	All
(Japan) / Bingo Racing; (Japan) / Showa Auto with Bingo Racing	88	(Chinese Taipei) Tiger Wu Chi-hsuan	PA	All
(Japan) Rn-sport	10	(Japan) "Motoki"	PA	All
(Japan) Rn-sport	23	(Japan) "Hirobon"	PA	1
(Japan) Rn-sport	23	(Japan) "Kensuke"	Am	2
(Japan) NGR	16	(Japan) "Hiro"	Am	All
(Japan) AWD Racing	27	(Canada) Jesse Swinimer	Am	3
(China) Sky Motorsports	36	(China) Sky Chen	Am	All
(Japan) Seven x Seven Racing	66	(Japan) "Bankcy"	PA	All
(Japan) Seven x Seven Racing	99	(Japan) Taichi Watarai	P	All
(Japan) Sky Group	78	(Japan) Iori Kimura	P	All
(Japan) CREF Girodisc Miraitaga	84	(Japan) Masa Taga	Am	3–4
Porsche Japan	91	(Japan) Itsuki Sato	P	All
(Japan) Bionic Jack Racing	98	(Japan) "Ikari"	PA	All
Privateer	77	(Japan) Masaru Hamasaki	PA	1–3, 5

Icon	Class
P	Pro Cup
PA	Pro-Am Cup
Am	Am Cup
	Guest drivers ineligible to score points

== Results ==
Round		Circuit	Pole position	Overall winner	Pro-Am Winner	Am Winner
1	R1	(Mie Prefecture) Suzuka Circuit	(Japan) Reimei Ito	(Japan) Kazuhisa Urabe	(Japan) "Hirobon"	(Japan) "Hiro"
1	R2	(Mie Prefecture) Suzuka Circuit	(Japan) Kazuhisa Urabe	(Japan) Iori Kimura	(Japan) "Bankcy"	(Japan) "Hiro"
2	R1	(Okayama Prefecture) Okayama International Circuit	(Japan) Kazuhisa Urabe	(Japan) Iori Kimura	(Japan) "Bankcy"	(China) Sky Chen
2	R2	(Okayama Prefecture) Okayama International Circuit	(Japan) Kazuhisa Urabe	(Japan) Taichi Watarai	(Japan) "Bankcy"	(Japan) "Hiro"
2	R3	(Okayama Prefecture) Okayama International Circuit		(Japan) Reimei Ito	(Japan) "Bankcy"	(Japan) "Hiro"
3	R1	(Shizuoka Prefecture) Fuji Speedway	(Japan) Kazuhisa Urabe	(Japan) Kazuhisa Urabe	(Japan) "Bankcy"	(Canada) Jesse Swinimer
3	R2	(Shizuoka Prefecture) Fuji Speedway	(Japan) Kazuhisa Urabe	(Japan) Kazuhisa Urabe	(Japan) "Bankcy"	(Japan) "Hiro"
4	R1	(Miyagi Prefecture) Sportsland Sugo	(Japan) Reimei Ito	(Japan) Reimei Ito	(Japan) "Bankcy"	(Japan) Masa Taga
4	R2	(Miyagi Prefecture) Sportsland Sugo	(Japan) Iori Kimura	(Japan) Taichi Watarai	(Chinese Taipei) Tiger Wu Chi-hsuan	(Japan) Masa Taga
5	R1	(Shizuoka Prefecture) Fuji Speedway	(Japan) Taichi Watarai	(Japan) Taichi Watarai	(Japan) "Bankcy"	(Japan) "Hiro"
5	R2	(Shizuoka Prefecture) Fuji Speedway	(Japan) Iori Kimura	(Japan) Iori Kimura	(Japan) "Bankcy"	(Japan) "Hiro"

== Championship standings ==
=== Scoring system ===
Points were awarded to the top fifteen classified drivers in every race, using the following system:

Position	1st	2nd	3rd	4th	5th	6th	7th	8th	9th	10th	11th	12th	13th	14th	15th
Points	25	20	17	14	12	10	9	8	7	6	5	4	3	2	1

=== Overall ===
Pos.	Driver	Team	SUZ		OKA			FUJ1		SUG		FUJ2		Points
Pos.	Driver	Team	R1	R2	R1	R2	R3	R1	R2	R1	R2	R1	R2	Points
1	(Japan) Iori Kimura	(Japan) Sky Racing	4	1	1	2	2	3	2	2	3	3	1	220
2	(Japan) Reimei Ito	(Japan) Bingo Racing	2	3	3	5	1	4	3	1	2	2	3	204
3	(Japan) Kazuhisa Urabe	(Japan) Hyper Water Racing	1	2	2	3	3	1	1	4	4	8	4	199
4	(Japan) Taichi Watarai	(Japan) Seven x Seven Racing	3	14	4	1	4	2	8	3	1	1	2	187
5	(Japan) "Bankcy"	(Japan) Seven x Seven Racing	7	4	6	4	6	6	4	6	6	4	6	125
6	(Japan) Itsuki Sato	Porsche Japan	8	6	5	6	5	5	7	5	8	5	5	117
7	(Japan) "Motoki"	(Japan) Rn-sport	Ret	7	8	11	7	7	5	7	11	6	8	85
8	(Japan) "Hiro"	(Japan) NGR	5	5	12	7	9	Ret	6	11	10	10	7	82
9	(Japan) "Ikari"	(Japan) Bionic Jack Racing	11	12	10	10	11	9	12	9	7	9	11	67
10	(Japan) Masaru Hamasaki	Privateer	9	9	7	9	8	11	9			7	9	66
11	(Chinese Taipei) Tiger Wu Chi-hsuan	(Japan) Bingo Racing	10	10	9	8	Ret	Ret	10	9	5	13	NC	55
12	(China) Sky Chen	(China) Sky Motorsports	13	11	11	13	10	12	14	12	13	12	10	48
13	(Japan) "Ikeda"	(Japan) Hyper Water Racing	12	13	WD	WD	WD	10	13	13	12	11	12	39
14	(Japan) "Hirobon"	(Japan) Rn-sport	6	8										18
17	(Japan) "Kensuke"	(Japan) Rn-sport			13	12	Ret							7
—	(Japan) Shinji Takei	(Japan) Bingo Racing	Ret	DNS										0
Guest drivers ineligible to score points
—	(Canada) Jesse Swinimer	(Japan) AWD Racing						8	11					0
—	(Japan) Masa Taga	(Japan) CREF Motor Sport						13	15	10	9			0
Pos.	Driver	Team	R1	R2	R1	R2	R3	R1	R2	R1	R2	R1	R2	Points
Pos.	Driver	Team	SUZ		OKA			FUJ1		SUG		FUJ2		Points

=== Pro-Am ===
Pos.	Driver	SUZ		OKA			FUJ1		SUG		FUJ2		Points
Pos.	Driver	R1	R2	R1	R2	R3	R1	R2	R1	R2	R1	R2	Points
1	(Japan) "Bankcy"	2	1	1	1	1	1	1	1	2	1	1	265
2	(Japan) "Motoki"	Ret	2	3	5	2	2	2	2	4	2	2	183
3	(Japan) "Ikari"	5	6	5	4	4	3	5	3	3	4	4	153
4	(Japan) Masaru Hamasaki	3	4	2	3	3	4	3			3	3	150
5	(Chinese Taipei) Tiger Wu Chi-hsuan	4	5	4	2	Ret	Ret	4	4	1	5	NC	126
6	(Japan) "Hirobon"	1	3										42
—	(Japan) Shinji Takei	Ret	WD										0
Pos.	Driver	R1	R2	R1	R2	R3	R1	R2	R1	R2	R1	R2	Points
Pos.	Driver	SUZ		OKA			FUJ1		SUG		FUJ2		Points

=== Am ===
Pos.	Driver	SUZ		OKA			FUJ1		SUG		FUJ2		Points
Pos.	Driver	R1	R2	R1	R2	R3	R1	R2	R1	R2	R1	R2	Points
1	(Japan) "Hiro"	1	1	2	1	1	Ret	1	2	2	1	1	245
2	(China) Sky Chen	3	2	1	3	2	3	4	3	4	3	2	210
3	(Japan) "Ikeda"	2	3	WD	WD	WD	2	3	4	3	2	3	156
6	(Japan) "Kensuke"			3	2	Ret							37
Guest drivers ineligible to score points
—	(Japan) Masa Taga						4	5	1	1			0
—	(Canada) Jesse Swinimer						1	2					0
Pos.	Driver	R1	R2	R1	R2	R3	R1	R2	R1	R2	R1	R2	Points
Pos.	Driver	SUZ		OKA			FUJ1		SUG		FUJ2		Points

=== Team ranking ===
Pos.	Team	Pts
1	Seven x Seven Racing	243
2	Bingo Racing	219
3	Hyper Water Racing	204
4	Rn-sports	92

== See also ==
- 2025 Porsche Supercup
- 2025 Porsche Carrera Cup France
- 2025 Porsche Carrera Cup Germany
- 2025 Porsche Carrera Cup North America
- 2025 Porsche Carrera Cup Asia
- 2025 Porsche Carrera Cup Australia
