= Taichi Watarai =

Japanese racing driver (born 2004)

- Nationality: (Japan) Japanese
- Born: 8 February 2004 (age 22) Saitama, Japan

Porsche Carrera Cup Japan career
- Debut season: 2025
- Current team: Seven x Seven Racing
- Car number: 99
- Starts: 11
- Wins: 3
- Podiums: 7
- Poles: 1
- Fastest laps: 3

Taichi Watarai (渡会太一, Watarai Taichi; born 8 February 2004) is a Japanese racing driver. He is currently competing in Porsche Carrera Cup Japan with Seven x Seven Racing.

== Career ==
Watarai was first involved in GT racing for the first time in 2024, where he made a one off appearance in Super Taikyū - ST-X with GTNET MotorSports. He did won in Mobility Resort Motegi.

Watarai then joined Seven x Seven Racing under Kiyoto Fujinami. He made his debut with the team in Middle East Trophy - 992 in 2025, where he competed in the Dubai 24 Hours. Watarai then competed in Super Taikyū - ST-X with Fujinami, Tsubasa Kondo, and team owner Hiroyuki Ogawa or "Bankcy". Watarai made his debut in SRO Japan Cup - GT3 with Seven x Seven as well, where he replaced Fujinami. He won in his first race debut in the series.

== Racing record ==
=== Career summary ===
Season	Series	Team	Races	Wins	Poles	FLaps	Podiums	Points	Position
2024	Super Taikyū - ST-X	GTNET MotorSports	2	1	2	N/A	1	107.5‡	5th‡
2024	F110 Cup	KF Motorsport	0	0	0	0	0	0	NC
2025	Porsche Carrera Cup Japan	Seven x Seven Racing	11	3	1	5	7	187	4th
2025	SRO Japan Cup - GT3	Seven x Seven Racing	6	1	1	0	2	79	6th
2025	Super Taikyū - ST-X	Seven x Seven Racing	5	4	2	N/A	5	129‡	**1st‡**
2025	Middle East Trophy - 992	Seven x Seven Racing							
2025	992 Endurance Cup	Team Parker Racing							
2025-26	Porsche Carrera Cup Middle East	Seven x Seven Racing	8	3	5	3	6	138.5	**1st**
2026	Porsche Carrera Cup Japan	Seven x Seven Racing	11	2	0	1	9	189	**1st**
2026	Super GT - GT300	Seven x Seven Racing	5	0	0	0	2	55	10th
2026	Super Taikyu - ST-X	Bankcy x Racing							
2026	Porsche Supercup	Looping by CarTech	1	0	0	0	0	0	NC†

‡ Teams' standings.

=== Complete Super GT results ===
(key) (Races in bold indicate pole position) (Races in italics indicate fastest lap)

Year	Team	Car	Class	1	2	3	4	5	6	7	8	Pos.	Points
2026	Seven x Seven Racing	Porsche 911 GT3 R (992.2)	GT300	OKA	FUJ	FUJ	SUZ; 14	SUG; 4	AUT; DSQ	MOT; 2	MOT; 2	10th	55
