= Tsubasa Kondo =

Japanese racing driver (born 1989)

- Nationality: (Japan) Japanese
- Born: 30 April 1989 (age 37) Nagaoka, Niigata, Japan

Super GT - GT300 career
- Debut season: 2016
- Current team: Seven x Seven Racing
- Car number: 666
- Former teams: Team Taisan SARD, Tsuchiya Engineering, Audi Team Hitotsuyama, Team Studie
- Starts: 18
- Wins: 2
- Podiums: 2
- Poles: 1

Previous series
- 2023-24 2019 2013-16, 18-22: GT World Challenge Asia; Porsche Carrera Cup Asia; Porsche Carrera Cup Japan

Championship titles
- 2009 2016, 2018, 2020, 2021: JAF Formula 4 East Series; Porsche Carrera Cup Japan

Tsubasa Kondo (近藤翼, Kondō Tsubasa; born 30 April 1989) is a Japanese racing driver who currently competes in the GT World Challenge Asia for Porsche Center Okazaki. He is a three-time Porsche Carrera Cup Japan champion.

== Career ==
=== Super GT ===
Kondo made his first appearance in Super GT in 2016, racing for Team Taisan SARD alongside Yuya Motojima. Kondo then made his full season debut in 2020 in the GT300, as he joined Audi Team Hitotsuyama alongside Shintaro Kawabata. Kondo clinched his first win with Kawabata in Suzuka Circuit. In 2022, Kondo was signed as third driver for Team Studie, and would replace Augusto Farfus for half of the season's rounds due to Farfus' commitment outside Japan. Kondo won alongside Seiji Ara in the third round at Suzuka. For 2025, Kondo contested his second full year in the series as he joined the newly founded Seven x Seven Racing alongside Kiyoto Fujinami in the Porsche 911 GT3 R (992).

=== GT World Challenge Asia ===
Since 2023, Kondo has raced in GT World Challenge Asia for Porsche Center Okazaki alongside Kiyoshi Uchiyama.

== Racing record ==
=== Career summary ===
Season	Series	Team	Races	Wins	Poles	FLaps	Podiums	Points	Position
2009	JAF Formula 4 - East Series	ZAP SPEED	6	3			4	76	**1st**
2009	JAF Formula 4 - All-Japan Final	ZAP SPEED	1	0	0	0	1	N/A	**3rd**
2010	Formula Challenge Japan	NDDP Maruso FCJ	12	0	0	0	1	6	10th
2011	Formula Challenge Japan	NDDP Maruso FCJ	13	1	1	0	2	36	5th
2013	Porsche Carrera Cup Japan	Improve Racing	11	4	3	2	7	155	**2nd**
2013	Porsche Carrera Cup Asia	Improve Racing	1	0	0	0	0	0	NC
2014	Porsche Carrera Cup Japan	SKY Racing							**3rd**
2014	Super Taikyu Series - ST-4	TC CORSE							
2015	Porsche Carrera Cup Japan	SKY Racing	10	0	2	0	10	172	**2nd**
2015	Super Taikyu Series - ST-4	TC CORSE							
2016	Porsche Carrera Cup Japan	SKY Racing	8	6	4	2	7		**1st**
2016	Super GT - GT300	Team Taisan SARD	3	0	0	0	0	9	18th
2016	Super Taikyu Series - ST-4	TC CORSE							
2017	Super Taikyu Series - ST-X	D'station Racing	6	1	1	1	2	79.5‡	**3rd‡**
2017	Super GT - GT300	VivaC Team Tsuchiya	2	0	1	0	0	1	24th
2018	Porsche Carrera Cup Japan	SKY Racing							**1st**
2018	Super Taikyu Series - ST-X	D'station Racing	4	1	1	1	2	46.5‡	7th‡
2018	24H GT Series - A6	D'station Racing							
2018	Super GT - GT300	Tsuchiya Engineering	2	0	1	0	0	1	24th
2019	Super Taikyu Series - ST-X	D'station Racing	5	1	2	3	5	109.5‡	**2nd‡**
2019	Porsche Carrera Cup Asia	EBM	2	0	0	0	1	24	18th
2019	Porsche Carrera Cup Japan	Nihon Kizai							
2020	Porsche Carrera Cup Japan	Nihon Kizai	8	2			8	148	**1st**
2020	Super Taikyu Series - ST-X	D'station Racing	5	2	4	0	2	81‡	4th‡
2020	Super GT - GT300	Audi Team Hitotsuyama	8	1	0	0	1	29	11th
2021	Super Taikyu Series - ST-X	D'station Racing	5	2	0	0	5	132.5‡	**1st‡**
2021	Porsche Carrera Cup Japan	Nihon Kizai	11	5			11	208	**1st**
2022	Super Taikyu Series - ST-1	D'station Racing	1	0	0	0	1	151.5‡	**2nd‡**
2022	Super Taikyu Series - ST-X	D'station Racing	4	0	0	0	2	49.5‡	7th‡
2022	Super GT - GT300	BMW Team Studie × CSL	4	1	1	0	1	21	17th
2022	Porsche Carrera Cup Japan	Nihon Kizai	9	4			9	197	**2nd**
2023	Super Taikyu Series - ST-1	D'station Racing	1	0	0	0	1	151.5‡	**2nd‡**
2023	Super Taikyu Series - ST-X	D'station Racing	1	0	0	0	0	6‡	8th‡
2023	GT World Challenge Asia	NK Racing	12	0	0	0	0	4	39th
2024	GT World Challenge Asia	Porsche Centre Okazaki	10	0	0	0	0	6	37th
2024	TGR GR86/BRZ Cup	Recaro Racing Team	6	0	0	0	1	16	13th
2024	Super Taikyu Series - ST-X	Porsche Team EBI	1	0	0	0	0	82‡	**3rd‡**
2025	Super GT - GT300	Seven x Seven Racing	7	1	0	1	2	38.5	16th
2025	Super Taikyū - ST-X	Seven x Seven Racing	3	2	1	0	3	87‡	**1st‡**
2025	Middle East Trophy - 992	Seven x Seven Racing							
2025	GT World Challenge Asia	Porsche Centre Okazaki	10	0	0	0	0	1	47th
2025	TGR GR86/BRZ Cup	Recaro Racing Team	3	0	0	1	0	4	22nd
2026	Porsche Carrera Cup Japan	Kyousei Racing	1	0	0	0	0	7	18th
2026	GT World Challenge Asia	Porsche Centre Okazaki	6	0	0	0	0	14	32nd
2026	TGR GR86/BRZ Cup	Recaro Racing Team							
2026	Super GT - GT300	D'station Racing							

‡ Teams' standings.

=== Complete Super GT results ===
(key) (Races in bold indicate pole position) (Races in italics indicate fastest lap)

Year	Team	Car	Class	1	2	3	4	5	6	7	8	9	DC	Points
2016	Team Taisan SARD	Audi R8 LMS	GT300	OKA	FSW	SUG; 19	FSW	SUZ	CHA	MOT; 6	MOT; 7		18th	9
2017	VivaC Team Tsuchiya	Toyota 86 MC	GT300	OKA	FUJ	AUT	SUG	FUJ	**SUZ**; 18	CHA	MOT		24th	1
2018	Tsuchiya Engineering	Toyota 86 MC	GT300	OKA	FUJ; Ret	SUZ	CHA	**FUJ**; 5	SUG	AUT	MOT		24th	1
2020	Audi Sport Team Hitotsuyama	Audi R8 LMS Evo	GT300	FUJ; 17	FUJ; 8	SUZ; 25	MOT; 5	FUJ; 14	SUZ; 1	MOT; 13	FUJ; 12		11th	29
2022	BMW Team Studie × CSL	BMW M4 GT3	GT300	OKA	FUJ; Ret	**SUZ**; 1	FUJ	SUZ; 12	SUG	AUT; 12	MOT		17th	21
2025	Seven x Seven Racing	Porsche 911 GT3 R (992)	GT300	OKA; 8	FUJ; 24	SEP	FS1; 9	FS2 (8)	SUZ; 9	SUG; 3	AUT; 1	MOT	16th	38.5

^{‡} Half points awarded as less than 75% of race distance was completed.
^{†} did not run during the race as a third driver and was ineligible for championship points.
^{(Number)} Driver did not take part in this sprint race, points are still awarded for the teammate's result.
^{*} Season still in progress.
