= KF Motorsport =

Japanese racing team

- Founded: 2022
- Team principal(s): Kiyoto Fujinami
- Founder(s): Kiyoto Fujinami
- Current series: Super GT GT300; SRO Japan Cup; Super Taikyu
- Current drivers: Super GT GT300: Kiyoto Fujinami; Tsubasa Kondo; SRO Japan Cup: "Bankcy"; Kiyoto Fujinami; Super GT GT300: "Bankcy"; Kiyoto Fujinami; Tsubasa Kondo; Taichi Watarai

KF Motorsport is a Japanese racing team and competes in Super GT GT300, SRO Japan Cup, and Super Taikyu ST-X under the guise of Seven x Seven Racing (read as 'seven by seven').

== History ==
The team was founded by two-time Super GT GT300 champion Kiyoto Fujinami. The team started racing in the Vita series cup. Then also were involved in Kyojo Cup.

=== SRO Japan Cup ===
The team made its first GT3 race in the SRO Japan Cup as Fujinami and seven x seven owner "Bankcy" competed in the final round in Okayama. The team competed with Porsche 911 GT3 R (992). Both won the race in their first race. Fujinami & "Bankcy" returns to the series and make their full season.

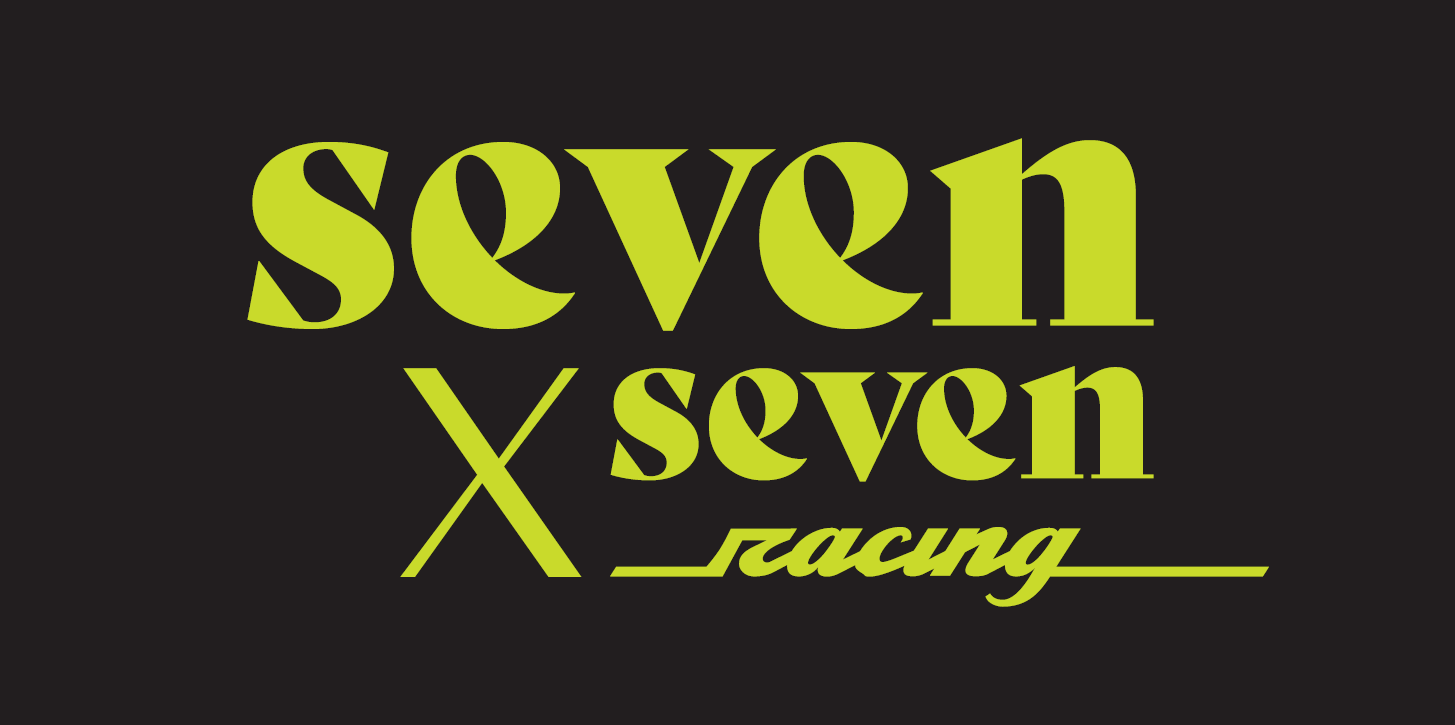
Seven × Seven Racing logo

=== Super GT GT300 ===
The team then ventured to their first Super GT season in 2025. The team will run Porsche 911 GT3 R (992) as well with Fujinami, and Super GT race winner Tsubasa Kondo. They also will run the Yokohama tires.

=== Super Taikyu ===
The team also venture into Super Taikyu as well for 2025. With the same car from other series, the team will race with all the Super GT & Japan Cup drivers, and Taichi Watarai.

=== Other Series ===
The team started competing in the Porsche Carrera Cup Japan in 2024. The team also ventured into international competition, racing in Porsche Carrera Cup Middle East with "Bankcy" on the Master Class. The team also entered the Dubai 24 Hour where they competed in the 992 class.

== Racing record ==
=== 24 Hours of Le Mans results ===
Year	Entrant	No.	Car	Drivers	Class	Laps	Pos.	Class Pos.
2026	(Germany) Proton Competition	9	Oreca 07-Gibson	(United Kingdom) Harry King (Japan) Kakunoshin Ohta (Germany) Jonas Ried	LMP2	356	25th	11th
