= 2025–26 Indian Racing League =

Indian motor racing championship

The 2025–26 Indian Racing League was a single seater motor racing championship held across India. 2025–26 was the fourth season of the championship. It started on 15 August 2025 at Kari Motor Speedway and ran over four race weekends until February of 2026.

After the cancellation of the fifth and final race weekend, Raoul Hyman and Fabienne Wohlwend won the Entrant Championship driving the No. 5 Goa Aces JA Racing car. Hyman and the Goa Aces defended their title for the third year running while Wohlwend claimed a maiden championship. The Goa Aces also defended their Teams' Championship title after first winning it in 2024.

== Teams and drivers ==
All teams were Indian-registered. Drivers were selected via a draft held on 15 July 2025. The three race weekends held in 2025 saw all drivers compete with single-seater Wolf GB08 Thunder cars, fitted with a 215 bhp (160 kW) Aprilia engine. The final round saw the series switch to the Alpine-powered Mygale M21-F4 cars used in the F4 Indian Championship.

Team	No.	Driver	Rounds
Goa Aces JA Racing	5	(South Africa) Raoul Hyman	NC, All
Goa Aces JA Racing	5	(Liechtenstein) Fabienne Wohlwend	NC, All
Goa Aces JA Racing	6	(India) Akash Gowda	NC, All
Goa Aces JA Racing	6	(India) Chetan Surineni	NC, All
Speed Demons Delhi	11	(India) Shahan Ali Mohsin	NC, All
Speed Demons Delhi	11	(India) Sai Sanjay	NC, 1–2
Speed Demons Delhi	11	(India) Ishaan Madesh	3
Speed Demons Delhi	22	(Australia) Caitlin Wood	NC, All
Speed Demons Delhi	22	(Malaysia) Alister Yoong	NC, All
Chennai Turbo Riders	14	(South Africa) Aqil Alibhai	NC, All
Chennai Turbo Riders	14	(India) Tijil Rao	NC, All
Chennai Turbo Riders	25	(Spain) Laura Camps Torras	NC, All
Chennai Turbo Riders	25	(India) Shibin Yousaf	NC, 1
Chennai Turbo Riders	25	(India) Viswas Vijayraj	2–3
Kolkata Royal Tigers	18	(France) Alexandra Hervé	NC, 1–2
Kolkata Royal Tigers	18	(United Kingdom) Jemma Moore	3
Kolkata Royal Tigers	18	(India) Sandeep Kumar	NC, All
Kolkata Royal Tigers	24	(United Kingdom) Tom Canning	NC, 1, 3
Kolkata Royal Tigers	24	(Denmark) Julius Dinesen	2
Kolkata Royal Tigers	24	(India) Sohil Shah	NC, All
Hyderabad Blackbirds	23	(United Kingdom) Jon Lancaster	NC, All
Hyderabad Blackbirds	23	(India) Mohamed Ryan	NC, All
Hyderabad Blackbirds	31	(India) Akshay Bohra	NC, 1
Hyderabad Blackbirds	31	(India) Akhil Rabindra	2
Hyderabad Blackbirds	31	(India) Divy Nandan	3
Hyderabad Blackbirds	31	(Czech Republic) Gabriela Jílková	NC, All
Kichcha's Kings Bengaluru	27	(India) Ruhaan Alva	NC, 2–3
Kichcha's Kings Bengaluru	27	(Switzerland) Neel Jani	NC, 2
Kichcha's Kings Bengaluru	27	(Spain) Dani Clos	1
Kichcha's Kings Bengaluru	27	(India) Akhil Rabindra	1
Kichcha's Kings Bengaluru	27	(France) Sachel Rotgé	3
Kichcha's Kings Bengaluru	70	(United Kingdom) Jem Hepworth	NC, All
Kichcha's Kings Bengaluru	70	(India) Kyle Kumaran	NC, All

=== Team changes ===
A new team joined the grid in Kichcha's Kings Bengaluru, led by actor Kiccha Sudeepa. In turn, the Bangalore Speedsters left the championship after entering every season since 2022. The Rarh Bengal Tigers meanwhile changed their name to Kolkata Royal Tigers, thereby returning to the guise under which the team was officially launched in 2024.

=== Driver changes ===
The reigning champions, Goa Aces JA Racing, saw Gabriela Jílková join the Hyderabad Blackbirds, while Shahan Ali Mohsin moved over to the Speed Demons Delhi and Sohil Shah was drafted by the Kolkata Royal Tigers. To replace them, the team took on Akash Gowda, who leaves the Delhi-branded team after three seasons, as well as Fabienne Wohlwend, who previously competed for the departing Rarh Bengal Tigers, and Indian F4 graduate Chetan Surineni.

The renamed Kolkata Royal Tigers entered the 2025 season with an all-new lineup after Nikhil Bohra left the championship, Alister Yoong moved to the Speed Demons Delhi, Ruhaan Alva joined the new Kichcha's Kings Bengaluru outfit and Fabienne Wohlwend was signed by the Goa Aces. The team drafted in reining champion Sohil Shah, Chennai Turbo Riders driver Sandeep Kumar, Hyderabad's 2024 substitute driver Tom Canning and debutant Alexandra Hervé, who last competed in the TTE Formula Renault series in 2022.

The Chennai Turbo Riders also have four new drivers after neither Mira Erda nor Emily Duggan returned to the series, Sandeep Kumar moved to the Kolkata Royal Tigers and both Jon Lancaster and Mohamed Ryan joined the Hyderabad Blackbirds. Ex-Hyderabad driver Laura Camps Torras will be the team's only entrant with previous championship experience, as it took on three debutants: reigning Indian Formula 4 champion Aqil Alibhai, radical driver Shibin Yousaf and Formula LGB competitor Tijil Rao.

Two of the departing Bangalore Speedsters' drivers found new berths: Caitlin Wood joined the Speed Demons Delhi and Kyle Kumaran moved to Kichcha's Kings Bengaluru. Both Rishon Rajeev and Julius Dinesen did not return to the championship.

The Speed Demons Delhi drafted three returning drivers to its team after both Álvaro Parente and Angélique Detavernier left the series and Akash Gowda joined the Goa Aces. Alister Yoong moved over from the Kolkata Royal Tigers, Shahan Ali Mohsin left the Goa Aces to join Delhi and Caitlin Wood joined from the departing Bangalore Speedsters.

The Hyderabad Blackbirds also renewed their whole roster as series mainstays Anindith Reddy and Akhil Rabindra both left after entering every season since 2022, Neel Jani joined Bengaluru and Laura Camps Torras moved to the Chennai Turbo Riders. The team took on a debutant in Formula Regional driver Akshay Bohra, as well as three returnees: Jon Lancaster and Mohamed Ryan moved over from the Chennai Turbo Riders, while Gabriela Jílková left the Goa Aces to join the team.

Debuting team Kichcha's Kings Bengaluru also drafted in three returning drivers and a debutant: Neel Jani, Ruhaan Alva and Kyle Kumaran joined the team after previously competing for the Hyderabad Blackbirds, the Kolkata Royal Tigers and the Bangalore Speedsters, respectively, while sportscar driver Jem Hepworth completed the team's lineup.

==== Mid-season ====
Kichcha's Kings Bengaluru changed both drivers of their No. 27 entry after the non-championship opener, with Jani and Alva being replaced by former Formula One test driver Dani Clos and 2022 drivers' champion Akhil Rabindra.

Alva and Jani returned for round two, and Rabindra moved over to the Hyderabad Blackbirds, where he replaced Akshay Bohra. The Chennai Turbo Riders meanwhile replaced Shibin Yousaf with series debutant Viswas Vijayraj, and at the Kolkata Royal Tigers, Tom Canning was absent and replaced by series returnee Julius Dinesen.

Round three saw several driver changes after its postponement by multiple months. Sai Sanjay was replaced by reigning MRF F2000 champion Ishaan Madesh at the Speed Demons Delhi, while Kolkata Royal Tigers' Alexandra Hervé and Julius Dinesen were replaced by GT driver Jemma Moore and returnee Tom Canning. GB3 driver Divy Nandan replaced Akhil Rabindra at the Hyderabad Blackbirds, while Neel Jani's seat at the Kichcha's Kings Bengaluru was filled by Indian F4 runner-up Sachel Rotgé.

== Race calendar ==
The provisional calendar, comprising five race weekends, was announced in July of 2025, with the venues of the final two rounds yet to be confirmed. In February 2025, the series confirmed plans to host a street race in the state of Goa as part of the 2025 season – this was later added as the third round of the series. In September 2025, the championship announced plans for another new venue, the Mumbai Street Circuit, for the season finale. The final two rounds were pushed back multiple times before the penultimate round was held in February of 2026, using an overhauled weekend format that added a third race featuring a mid-race driver swap. The season final at Mumbai was later announced to instead be part of the planned 2026 season, thereby making the Goa round the season final.

No.		Circuit	Date	Map of circuit locations
2025				2025–26 Indian Racing League is located in India
NC	R1	Kari Motor Speedway, Chettipalayam	16 August	2025–26 Indian Racing League is located in India
NC	R2	Kari Motor Speedway, Chettipalayam	17 August	2025–26 Indian Racing League is located in India
1	R1	Madras International Circuit, Irungattukottai	23 August	2025–26 Indian Racing League is located in India
1	R2	Madras International Circuit, Irungattukottai	24 August	2025–26 Indian Racing League is located in India
2	R1	Kari Motor Speedway, Chettipalayam	4 October	2025–26 Indian Racing League is located in India
2	R2	Kari Motor Speedway, Chettipalayam	5 October	2025–26 Indian Racing League is located in India
2026				2025–26 Indian Racing League is located in India
3	R1	Goa Street Circuit, Mopa	14 February	2025–26 Indian Racing League is located in India
3	R2	Goa Street Circuit, Mopa	14 February	2025–26 Indian Racing League is located in India
3	R3	Goa Street Circuit, Mopa	15 February	2025–26 Indian Racing League is located in India

== Race results ==
No.		Circuit	Pole position	Fastest lap	Winning driver	Winning team
NC	R1	Kari Motor Speedway	(South Africa) Raoul Hyman	(South Africa) Raoul Hyman	(South Africa) Raoul Hyman	Goa Aces JA Racing
NC	R2	Kari Motor Speedway	(India) Akshay Bohra	(India) Sai Sanjay	(India) Sai Sanjay	Speed Demons Delhi
1	R1	Madras International Circuit	(India) Shahan Ali Mohsin	(India) Shahan Ali Mohsin	(India) Shahan Ali Mohsin	Speed Demons Delhi
1	R2	Madras International Circuit	(India) Sohil Shah	(India) Sohil Shah	(India) Sohil Shah	Kolkata Royal Tigers
2	R1	Kari Motor Speedway	(India) Kyle Kumaran	(India) Kyle Kumaran	(India) Kyle Kumaran	Kichcha's Kings Bengaluru
2	R2	Kari Motor Speedway	(South Africa) Raoul Hyman	(South Africa) Raoul Hyman	(South Africa) Raoul Hyman	Goa Aces JA Racing
3	R1	Goa Street Circuit	(South Africa) Aqil Alibhai	(South Africa) Raoul Hyman	(South Africa) Raoul Hyman	Goa Aces JA Racing
3	R2	Goa Street Circuit	(Czech Republic) Gabriela Jílková	(India) Sohil Shah	(Malaysia) Alister Yoong	Speed Demons Delhi
3	R3	Goa Street Circuit	No. 24 Kolkata Royal Tigers	(South Africa) Raoul Hyman	No. 5 Goa Aces JA Racing	Goa Aces JA Racing
3	R3	Goa Street Circuit	(United Kingdom) Tom Canning (India) Sohil Shah	(South Africa) Raoul Hyman	(South Africa) Raoul Hyman (Liechtenstein) Fabienne Wohlwend	Goa Aces JA Racing

== Season report ==
The 2025–26 Indian Racing League began at Kari Motor Speedway with Raoul Hyman taking pole position for Goa Aces JA Racing after Kichcha's Kings Bengaluru driver Kyle Kumaran had his fastest qualifying laptimes deleted. He led lights-to-flag, fending off Hyderabad Blackbirds driver Jon Lancaster before the latter suffered a technical issue. Kumaran took second, ahead of Goa's Chetan Surineni. Pole position for the second race went to Hyderabad's Akshay Bohra, but car issues saw him retire. That handed the lead to Delhi's Sai Sanjay. He held on to win as Goa's Fabienne Wohlwend beat Bengaluru's Neel Jani to second. This first round would later be changed to a non-scoring round.

The first points-scoring round was held at Madras International Circuit, where Delhi's Shahan Ali Mohsin dominated the opening day of competition. He took pole position by nearly half a second before gapping the field to take victory. Behind him, teammate Alister Yoong looked set to take second place before Chennai's Aqil Alibhai overtook him in the final corner. Kolkata Royal Tigers' Sohil Shah claimed the second pole position of the weekend. He led Bohra throughout a disrupted race that was punctured by multiple interruptions. Shah remained faultless despite pressure from Bohra to secure victory and the championship lead, with Bohra taking second and Lancaster finishing third.

The series returned to Kari Motor Speedway for its third weekend, and Kumaran went fastest in qualifying once again. This time, his laptime would stand, and he converted his grid spot into a lead that he would not relinquish until the race ended. Hyderabad's Akhil Rabindra came second as Jani rose from seventh on the grid to take the final podium spot. Day two brought a similarly dominant performance, this time for Hyman, who returned to the top step of the podium after taking pole position in qualifying and leading every lap of the race. Mohsin finished second and Bengaluru's Ruhaan Alva took third. Gabriela Jílková finished fourth to place her No. 31 Hyderabad machine atop the points standings.

The season final brought a new track in the Goa Street Circuit, as well as new Formula 4 machinery and a new weekend format with a third race that included a mid-race driver swap. First came the two normal races, however, and Alibhai took pole position for the first one. He was overtaken by Hyman early on, who led the rest of the race to take victory as series debutant Ishaan Madesh took third for Delhi. Jílková started race two on pole position, but ran off track to hand the lead to Yoong, who won ahead of Shah and Alva. Qualifying for the third race saw Shah and his teammate Tom Canning claim pole position, but Hyman once again claimed the lead immediately before Canning retired. Hyman built a gap and handed the car to Wohlwend, who endured multiple safety cars to take a home victory for Goa and clinch both the Entrant and the Teams' Championship title.

== Championship standings ==
=== Scoring system ===
Points were awarded to the top ten classified finishers as follows:

Race Position	**1st**	**2nd**	**3rd**	**4th**	**5th**	**6th**	**7th**	**8th**	**9th**	**10th**	**Pole**	**FL**
Points	25	18	15	12	10	8	6	4	2	1	1	1

Drivers sharing a car added the points they earned in their respective races to a shared total.

=== Entrant championship ===
Pos	Entrant	Drivers	KAR1		CHE		KAR2		GOA			Pts
Pos	Entrant	Drivers	R1	R2	R1	R2	R1	R2	R1	R2	R3	Pts
1	No. 5 Goa Aces JA Racing	(South Africa) Raoul Hyman	**1**			4		**1**	1		1	107
1	No. 5 Goa Aces JA Racing	(Liechtenstein) Fabienne Wohlwend		2	7		Ret			5	1	107
2	No. 22 Speed Demons Delhi	(Australia) Caitlin Wood		Ret		6	5		5		3	87
2	No. 22 Speed Demons Delhi	(Malaysia) Alister Yoong	Ret		3			8		1	3	87
3	No. 24 Kolkata Royal Tigers	(United Kingdom) Tom Canning	Ret		4				4		**Ret**	81
3	No. 24 Kolkata Royal Tigers	(India) Sohil Shah		Ret		**1**	DNS			2	**Ret**	81
3	No. 24 Kolkata Royal Tigers	(Denmark) Julius Dinesen						5				81
4	No. 14 Chennai Turbo Riders	(South Africa) Aqil Alibhai	4		2		4		**2**		4	75
4	No. 14 Chennai Turbo Riders	(India) Tijil Rao		5		Ret		6		7	4	75
5	No. 27 Kichcha's Kings Bengaluru	(India) Ruhaan Alva	Ret					3		3	2	64
5	No. 27 Kichcha's Kings Bengaluru	(France) Sachel Rotgé							DNS		2	64
5	No. 27 Kichcha's Kings Bengaluru	(Spain) Dani Clos			10							64
5	No. 27 Kichcha's Kings Bengaluru	(Switzerland) Neel Jani		3			3					64
5	No. 27 Kichcha's Kings Bengaluru	(India) Akhil Rabindra				Ret						64
6	No. 31 Hyderabad Blackbirds	(India) Akshay Bohra		**Ret**		2						61
6	No. 31 Hyderabad Blackbirds	(Czech Republic) Gabriela Jílková	Ret		6			4		**Ret**	Ret	61
6	No. 31 Hyderabad Blackbirds	(India) Divy Nandan							8		Ret	61
6	No. 31 Hyderabad Blackbirds	(India) Akhil Rabindra					2					61
7	No. 11 Speed Demons Delhi	(India) Shahan Ali Mohsin	Ret		**1**			2		DNS	Ret	60
7	No. 11 Speed Demons Delhi	(India) Ishaan Madesh							3		Ret	60
7	No. 11 Speed Demons Delhi	(India) Sai Sanjay		1		Ret	Ret					60
8	No. 70 Kichcha's Kings Bengaluru	(United Kingdom) Jem Hepworth		Ret		7		7		8	6	53
8	No. 70 Kichcha's Kings Bengaluru	(India) Kyle Kumaran	2		9		**1**		Ret		6	53
9	No. 6 Goa Aces JA Racing	(India) Akash Gowda		4	8		6		7		5	40
9	No. 6 Goa Aces JA Racing	(India) Chetan Surineni	3			Ret		Ret		4	5	40
10	No. 18 Kolkata Royal Tigers	(France) Alexandra Hervé	5		Ret		DNS					26
10	No. 18 Kolkata Royal Tigers	(United Kingdom) Jemma Moore								6	Ret	26
10	No. 18 Kolkata Royal Tigers	(India) Sandeep Kumar		6		5		DNS	6		Ret	26
11	No. 23 Hyderabad Blackbirds	(United Kingdom) Jon Lancaster	Ret			3	DNS			Ret	Ret	25
11	No. 23 Hyderabad Blackbirds	(India) Mohamed Ryan		7	5			DNS	Ret		Ret	25
12	No. 25 Chennai Turbo Riders	(Spain) Laura Camps Torras		Ret		8		DNS	9		Ret	6
12	No. 25 Chennai Turbo Riders	(India) Viswas Vijayraj					DNS			DNS	Ret	6
12	No. 25 Chennai Turbo Riders	(India) Shibin Yousaf	6		Ret							6
Pos	Entrant	Drivers	R1	R2	R1	R2	R1	R2	R1	R2	R3	Pts
Pos	Entrant	Drivers	KAR1		CHE		KAR2		GOA			Pts

Colour	Result
Gold	Winner
Silver	Second place
Bronze	Third place
Green	Points classification
Blue	Non-points classification
Blue	Non-classified finish (NC)
Purple	Retired, not classified (Ret)
Red	Did not qualify (DNQ)
Red	Did not pre-qualify (DNPQ)
Black	Disqualified (DSQ)
White	Did not start (DNS)
White	Withdrew (WD)
White	Race cancelled (C)
Blank	Did not practice (DNP)
Blank	Did not arrive (DNA)
Blank	Excluded (EX)

**Bold** – Pole

Italics – Fastest Lap

=== Teams' championship ===
Pos	Team	KAR1		CHE		KAR2		GOA			Pts
Pos	Team	R1	R2	R1	R2	R1	R2	R1	R2	R3	Pts
1	Goa Aces JA Racing	**1**	2	7	4	6	**1**	1	4	1	147
1	Goa Aces JA Racing	3	4	8	Ret	Ret	Ret	7	5	5	147
2	Speed Demons Delhi	Ret	1	**1**	6	5	2	3	1	3	147
2	Speed Demons Delhi	Ret	Ret	3	Ret	Ret	8	5	DNS	Ret	147
3	Kichcha's Kings Bengaluru	2	3	9	7	**1**	3	Ret	3	2	117
3	Kichcha's Kings Bengaluru	Ret	Ret	10	Ret	3	7	DNS	8	6	117
4	Kolkata Royal Tigers	5	6	4	**1**	DNS	5	4	2	Ret	106
4	Kolkata Royal Tigers	Ret	Ret	Ret	5	DNS	DNS	6	6	Ret	106
5	Hyderabad Blackbirds	Ret	7	5	2	2	4	8	**Ret**	Ret	85
5	Hyderabad Blackbirds	Ret	**Ret**	6	3	DNS	DNS	Ret	Ret	Ret	85
6	Chennai Turbo Riders	4	5	2	8	4	6	**2**	7	4	81
6	Chennai Turbo Riders	6	Ret	Ret	Ret	DNS	DNS	9	DNS	Ret	81
Pos	Team	R1	R2	R1	R2	R1	R2	R1	R2	R3	Pts
Pos	Team	KAR1		CHE		KAR2		GOA			Pts
