= 2022 Indian Racing League =

Motor racing championship

The 2022 Indian Racing League was a single seater motor racing championship held across India. The series served as a revised reboot of the X1 Racing League and was originally planned to be run alongside the Formula Regional Indian Championship and F4 Indian Championship. These two championships were delayed to 2023, but the Indian Racing League still went ahead.

Akhil Rabindra (Hyderabad Blackbirds) won the drivers' title, while Godspeed Kochi won the teams' championship.

== Teams and drivers ==
All drivers competed with single-seater Wolf GB08 Thunder cars, fitted with a 215 bhp (160 kW) Aprilia engine. The teams were based on Indian cities, like they were in the X1 Racing League.

Team	No.	Driver	Rounds
Godspeed Kochi	1	(India) Ruhaan Alva	All
Godspeed Kochi	1	(Liechtenstein) Fabienne Wohlwend	All
Godspeed Kochi	2	(United Kingdom) Jordan Albert	1
Godspeed Kochi	2	(Malaysia) Alister Yoong	2–4
Godspeed Kochi	2	(India) Nikhil Bohra	All
Bangalore Speedsters	3	(Philippines) Bianca Bustamante	All
Bangalore Speedsters	3	(India) Rishon Rajeev	All
Bangalore Speedsters	4	(India) Anshul Gandhi	All
Bangalore Speedsters	4	(United Kingdom) Oliver Webb	1, 3–4
Bangalore Speedsters	4	(India) Yash Aradhya	2
Chennai Turbo Riders	5	(India) Parth Ghorpade	All
Chennai Turbo Riders	5	(Canada) Nicole Havrda	All
Chennai Turbo Riders	6	(United Kingdom) Jon Lancaster	All
Chennai Turbo Riders	6	(India) Vishnu Prasad	1
Chennai Turbo Riders	6	(India) Sandeep Kumar	2–4
Goa Aces	7	(South Africa) Raoul Hyman	1–2
Goa Aces	7	(Poland) Kevin Mirocha	3–4
Goa Aces	7	(Czech Republic) Gabriela Jílková	All
Goa Aces	8	(India) Amir Sayed	All
Goa Aces	8	(India) Sohil Shah	All
Hyderabad Blackbirds	9	(Switzerland) Neel Jani	1–3
Hyderabad Blackbirds	9	(United Kingdom) Tom Canning	4
Hyderabad Blackbirds	9	(India) Akhil Rabindra	All
Hyderabad Blackbirds	10	(France) Lola Lovinfosse	All
Hyderabad Blackbirds	10	(India) Anindith Reddy	All
Speed Demons Delhi	11	(India) Akash Gowda	All
Speed Demons Delhi	11	(India) Shahan Ali Mohsin	All
Speed Demons Delhi	12	(Malaysia) Mitchell Gilbert	All
Speed Demons Delhi	12	(France) Célia Martin	All

== Calendar and results ==
As the series was planned to be run alongside the two FIA-certified Indian junior series, its calendar followed the two series, so it was originally planned to consist of five rounds in February 2022, before being moved to November and December. When the two other series were cancelled, the IRL calendar was revised and then included four rounds at two circuits, as well as a pre-season test to be held on November 14 at Madras Motor Race Track.

Round		Circuit	Date	Pole position	Fastest lap	Winning driver/s	Winning team
1	R1	(India) Hyderabad Street Circuit, Hyderabad	20 November	Event cancelled after practice on safety grounds			
1	R2	(India) Hyderabad Street Circuit, Hyderabad	20 November	Event cancelled after practice on safety grounds			
1	R3	(India) Hyderabad Street Circuit, Hyderabad	20 November	Event cancelled after practice on safety grounds			
2	R1	(India) Madras Motor Race Track, Chennai	26 November	(Switzerland) Neel Jani (India) Akhil Rabindra	(Switzerland) Neel Jani	(Switzerland) Neel Jani	Hyderabad Blackbirds
2	R2	(India) Madras Motor Race Track, Chennai	27 November	(Switzerland) Neel Jani (India) Akhil Rabindra	(India) Akhil Rabindra	(India) Akhil Rabindra	Hyderabad Blackbirds
2	R3	(India) Madras Motor Race Track, Chennai	27 November		(Switzerland) Neel Jani	(Switzerland) Neel Jani (India) Akhil Rabindra	Hyderabad Blackbirds
3	R1	(India) Madras Motor Race Track, Chennai	3 December	(India) Nikhil Bohra (Malaysia) Alister Yoong	(India) Rishon Rajeev	(Malaysia) Alister Yoong	Godspeed Kochi
3	R2	(India) Madras Motor Race Track, Chennai	4 December	(India) Akash Gowda (India) Shahan Ali Mohsin	(Switzerland) Neel Jani	(India) Shahan Ali Mohsin	Speed Demons Delhi
3	R3	(India) Madras Motor Race Track, Chennai	4 December		(India) Rishon Rajeev	(Switzerland) Neel Jani (India) Akhil Rabindra	Hyderabad Blackbirds
4	R1	(India) Hyderabad Street Circuit, Hyderabad	11 December	(India) Nikhil Bohra (Malaysia) Alister Yoong	(India) Sohil Shah	(Malaysia) Alister Yoong	Godspeed Kochi
4	R2	(India) Hyderabad Street Circuit, Hyderabad	11 December	(India) Nikhil Bohra (Malaysia) Alister Yoong	(India) Nikhil Bohra	(India) Nikhil Bohra	Godspeed Kochi
4	R3	(India) Hyderabad Street Circuit, Hyderabad	11 December		(United Kingdom) Jon Lancaster	(India) Nikhil Bohra (Malaysia) Alister Yoong	Godspeed Kochi

== Season summary ==
The season was plagued by miscommunication, organisational challenges and extreme reliability issues for the cars. Running at the first round in Hyderabad was cancelled following the opening practice session after Vishnu Prasad broke his leg in a crash, but this was not communicated to patrons or the outside world until after the event was scheduled to conclude. The season-opener was also marred by a tree branch falling onto one of the cars and an injury for a marshal.

Action got underway in Round 2 at the Madras International Circuit. Wheel nut failures dominated the sprint races, as Akash Gowda stopped on circuit in the opening race and Raoul Hyman suffered a rollover in Race 2 induced by one whilst running second. Célia Martin also crashed heavily in the second race. Alister Yoong and Jon Lancaster crashed on the opening lap of the feature race, whilst Sohil Shah clashed with Lola Lovinfosse on the last lap in the battle for the last step of the podium. The event was swept by the Hyderabad Blackbirds partnership of Neel Jani and Akhil Rabindra, with Fabienne Wohlwend third in the standings after she and co-driver Ruhaan Alva drove from second-last to second in the feature race.

Round 3 was held in Chennai once again, and Race 1 was curtailed by a sudden storm. Yoong claimed the first win for Godspeed Kochi as Rabindra slid off at the final corner from second. As less than 75% of the race was completed, half-points were awarded. Qualifying for Race 2 was also heavily influenced by changeable weather conditions, with Akash Gowda taking a surprise pole for Speed Demons Delhi on behalf of co-driver Shahan Ali Mohsin. Mohsin took a lights-to-flag win as the bigger names were disadvantaged by the lower starting positions, as demonstrated by Jani who spun out Wohlwend. Bianca Bustamante was demoted from the podium for a jump-start penalty; said penalties also affected Alva and Gabriela Jílková in Race 1. The feature race was dominated by Safety Car mismanagement – Lovinfosse stopped on track in the middle of the pit-stop cycle, with only Rabindra, Mohsin and Lancaster left to complete their mandatory driver changes. Due to the minimum stop time, those three cars came out a lap up on the rest of the field, with no way to communicate this to the rest of the field. The Safety Car was deployed in the closing stages of the race to clean up the issues, but Sandeep Kumar stopped on track from second on the penultimate lap and the race finished under yellow. Bustamante and co-driver Rishon Rajeev took the last podium place, but were again penalised – this time for not meeting the minimum pit-stop time.

The championship concluded in a wet Hyderabad. With the departure of Jani and Lovinfosse falling ill, series leaders Hyderabad Blackbirds were on the back foot – and even more so after nearest rivals Godspeed Kochi completed a front-row lockout of all three races. Oliver Webb and Anshul Gandhi's car was withdrawn from the weekend after a hole was found in the tub, and the other Bangalore Speedsters entry was also withdrawn after Rajeev crashed on the opening lap of Race 1. Yoong dominated the opening race, but Wohlwend retired with mechanical dramas from a comfortable second-place. Martin also retired with gearbox problems, resulting in co-driver Mitchell Gilbert not starting Race 2. Despite a brief engine shutdown for Alva, he finished second to team-mate Nikhil Bohra in Race 2 after Hyderabad's Anindith Reddy was disqualified for receiving outside assistance.

Hyderabad needed to win the final race with Rabindra and Tom Canning (Jani's replacement) to stand a chance of taking the teams' championship but, after three aborted starts due to technical issues with the cars, they were spun at the opening corner by Lancaster. The Chennai Turbo Riders car of Lancaster and Kumar then jumped the Kochi cars in the stop cycle and won the race, but were later demoted to fourth for the opening-lap contact. Yoong and Bohra inherited the win, but despite Wohlwend and Alva receiving a penalty for making their pit-stop outside the designated window the Godspeed Kochi team comfortably claimed the title in the final race. The Blackbirds consolation prize was a 1–2 in the drivers' standings for Rabindra and Jani despite confirmation mid-season that a drivers' championship would not be awarded; This was not the only administrative issue, as the point-scoring system supplied by the series did not mathematically align with the final points tally.

== Championship standings ==
Three races were held per round – two 20-minute sprint races and a 35-minute feature race. As there were two drivers per car, for Race 1 Driver A qualified and Driver B started and for Race 2 Driver B qualified and Driver A started. The feature race saw the grid determined by combined qualifying times, with both drivers competing by way of a mandatory driver change.

=== Scoring system ===
Points were awarded to the top ten classified finishers as follows:

Race Position	1st	2nd	3rd	4th	5th	6th	7th	8th	9th	10th	Pole	FL
Sprint races	25	18	15	12	10	8	6	4	2	1	1	1
Feature race	50	36	30	24	20	16	12	8	4	2	1	1

=== Drivers' standings ===
Pos.	Driver	HYD1 (India)			CHE1 (India)			CHE2 (Note: Half-points were awarded in Race 1 as less than 75% of the race distance was completed.) (India)			HYD2 (India)			Points
1	(India) Akhil Rabindra	C	C	C	P	1	1	5		1		5	Ret	143
2	(Switzerland) Neel Jani	C	C	C	1	P	1		6	1				137
3	(Malaysia) Alister Yoong				2		Ret	1		4	1	P	1	131.5
4	(India) Nikhil Bohra	C	C	C		Ret	Ret	P	3	4	P	1	1	118
5	(India) Ruhaan Alva	C	C	C	4		2	6		5		2	6	106
6	(Liechtenstein) Fabienne Wohlwend	C	C	C		2	2		9	5	Ret		6	92
7	(India) Amir Sayed	C	C	C		6	3		5	3		6	Ret	86
8	(India) Sohil Shah	C	C	C	Ret		3	Ret		3	3		Ret	76
9	(United Kingdom) Jon Lancaster	C	C	C		3	Ret		2	Ret		4	4	70
10	(Czech Republic) Gabriela Jílková	C	C	C	Ret		DNS	7		7	2		2	69
11	(Canada) Nicole Havrda	C	C	C	6		5	9		8	6		5	65
12	(Poland) Kevin Mirocha								11	7		3	2	63
13	(India) Shahan Ali Mohsin	C	C	C		Ret	Ret		1	2		Ret	DNS	62
14	(India) Parth Ghorpade	C	C	C		Ret	5		10	8		7	5	55
15	(India) Akash Gowda	C	C	C	Ret		Ret	4	P	2	5		DNS	54
16	(India) Anindith Reddy	C	C	C		4	Ret		7	Ret	DNS (Note: As Lola Lovinfosse fell ill during the last round, her teammate Anindith Reddy was entered into both sprint races and drove the whole feature race.)	DSQ	3	48
17	(Philippines) Bianca Bustamante	C	C	C		5	6		8	6		DNS	Ret	46
18	(India) Rishon Rajeev	C	C	C	Ret		6	2		6	Ret		Ret	43
19	(India) Sandeep Kumar				8		Ret	8		Ret	7		4	36
20	(India) Anshul Gandhi	C	C	C	5		4	10		Ret		DNS	DNS	34.5
21	(Malaysia) Mitchell Gilbert	C	C	C	3		DNS		4	Ret		Ret	DNS	27
22	(India) Yash Aradhya					Ret	4							24
23	(France) Lola Lovinfosse	C	C	C	7		Ret	3		Ret	WD		WD	13.5
24	(United Kingdom) Tom Canning										4		Ret	12
—	(France) Célia Martin	C	C	C		Ret	DNS	Ret		Ret	Ret		DNS	—
—	(United Kingdom) Oliver Webb	C	C	C					DNS	Ret	DNS		DNS	—
—	(South Africa) Raoul Hyman	C	C	C		Ret	DNS							—
—	(United Kingdom) Jordan Albert	C	C	C										—
—	(India) Vishnu Prasad	C	C	C										—
Pos.	Driver	HYD1 (India)			CHE1 (India)			CHE2 (India)			HYD2 (India)			Points

=== Teams' standings ===
In the feature race, points were awarded to both drivers and were therefore doubled for the entry (e.g. a winning entry will receive 50+50 points) in addition to any extra points for pole position or fastest lap, which were only awarded to one driver.

Pos.	Team	No.	HYD1 (India)			CHE1 (India)			CHE2 (Note: Half-points were awarded in Race 1 as less than 75% of the race distance was completed.) (India)			HYD2 (India)			Points
1	Godspeed Kochi	1	C	C	C	4	2	2	6	9	5	Ret	2	6	445.5
1	Godspeed Kochi	2	C	C	C	2	Ret	Ret	1	3	4	1	1	1	445.5
2	Hyderabad Blackbirds	9	C	C	C	1	1	1	5	6	1	4	5	Ret	367
2	Hyderabad Blackbirds	10	C	C	C	7	4	Ret	3	7	Ret	DNS	DSQ	3	367
3	Goa Aces	7	C	C	C	Ret	Ret	DNS	7	11	7	2	3	2	294
3	Goa Aces	8	C	C	C	Ret	6	3	Ret	5	3	3	6	Ret	294
4	Chennai Turbo Riders	5	C	C	C	6	Ret	5	9	10	8	6	7	5	227
4	Chennai Turbo Riders	6	C	C	C	8	3	Ret	8	2	Ret	7	4	4	227
5	Bangalore Speedsters	3	C	C	C	Ret	5	6	2	8	6	Ret	DNS	Ret	147.5
5	Bangalore Speedsters	4	C	C	C	5	Ret	4	10	DNS	Ret	DNS	DNS	DNS	147.5
6	Speed Demons Delhi	11	C	C	C	Ret	Ret	Ret	4	1	2	5	Ret	DNS	141
6	Speed Demons Delhi	12	C	C	C	3	Ret	DNS	Ret	4	Ret	Ret	Ret	DNS	141
Pos.	Team	No.	HYD1 (India)			CHE1 (India)			CHE2 (India)			HYD2 (India)			Points

† – Drivers did not finish the race, but were classified having completed 90% of the race distance.
