= 2023 Indian Racing League =

Indian motor racing championship

The 2023 Indian Racing League was a single seater motor racing championship held across India. The season was heavily disrupted by Cyclone Michaung making landfall at the Indian east coast.

After three of the planned four rounds were held, the season was concluded early, with the No. 24 Goa Aces car piloted by Raoul Hyman and Sohil Shah winning the Entrant Championship and the Bangalore Speedsters victorious in the Teams' Championship

== Teams and drivers ==
All drivers competed with single-seater Wolf GB08 Thunder cars, fitted with a 215 bhp (160 kW) Aprilia engine.

Team	No.	Driver	Rounds
Hyderabad Blackbirds	1	(India) Akhil Rabindra	All
Hyderabad Blackbirds	1	(Portugal) Álvaro Parente	1
Hyderabad Blackbirds	1	(Switzerland) Neel Jani	2–3
Hyderabad Blackbirds	9	(Spain) Laura Camps Torras	All
Hyderabad Blackbirds	9	(India) Anindith Reddy	All
Godspeed Kochi	2	(India) Nikhil Bohra	All
Godspeed Kochi	2	(Malaysia) Alister Yoong	All
Godspeed Kochi	5	(India) Ruhaan Alva	All
Godspeed Kochi	5	(Liechtenstein) Fabienne Wohlwend	All
Chennai Turbo Riders	6	(Canada) Nicole Havrda	1–2
Chennai Turbo Riders	6	(India) Mohamed Ryan	All
Chennai Turbo Riders	33	(United Kingdom) Jon Lancaster	All
Chennai Turbo Riders	33	(India) Sai Sanjay	All
Goa Aces	7	(Czech Republic) Gabriela Jílková	All
Goa Aces	7	(India) Amir Sayed	All
Goa Aces	24	(South Africa) Raoul Hyman	All
Goa Aces	24	(India) Sohil Shah	All
Bangalore Speedsters	16	(India) Ashwin Datta	All
Bangalore Speedsters	16	(United Kingdom) Oliver Webb	All
Bangalore Speedsters	70	(India) Kyle Kumaran	All
Bangalore Speedsters	70	(United Kingdom) Sarah Moore	All
Speed Demons Delhi	18	(Malaysia) Mitchell Gilbert	All
Speed Demons Delhi	18	(India) Sandeep Kumar	All
Speed Demons Delhi	22	(India) Akash Gowda	All
Speed Demons Delhi	22	(United Kingdom) Chloe Chong	2–3

=== Team changes ===
Chennai Turbo Riders were initially confirmed to be renamed "Chennai Supersonics", but the "Turbo Riders" moniker was later reinstated.

=== Driver changes ===
Oliver Webb was the only returning driver at Bangalore Speedsters. Bianca Bustamante, Rishon Rajeev, Anshul Gandhi and Webb's substitute driver Yash Aradhya all left the team. The team signed W Series driver Sarah Moore and MRF F2000 drivers Kyle Kumaran and Ashwin Datta to replace them.

Chennai Turbo Riders replaced their Indian drivers. Parth Ghorpade, Vishnu Prasad and his injury substitute Sandeep Kumar were replaced by 2022–23 MRF F2000 champion and runner-up Sai Sanjay and Mohamed Ryan. Kumar moved to Speed Demons Delhi as a last-minute replacement for Shahan Ali Mohsin, who moved to the F4 Indian Championship, whilst F1 Academy driver Chloe Chong replaced Célia Martin as original signing Belén García did not compete.

Raoul Hyman rejoined Goa Aces after having to sit out the second half of the 2022 season to conduct Super Formula testing. This saw his replacement, Kevin Mirocha, leave the series.

British GT driver Jordan Albert, who was entered for reigning Teams' Champion Godspeed Kochi for the cancelled opening round of the 2022 season, did not return to the series.

Hyderabad Blackbirds announced GT driver Álvaro Parente for the first half of the season, replacing Thomas Canning. Neel Jani is expected to return to the team in the second half having contested most of the 2022 season. Lola Lovinfosse was originally confirmed to be competing for the team, but was replaced with Laura Camps Torras the day before the season started.

== Calendar ==
All events were held in India and were run in tandem with the F4 Indian Championship.

No.		Circuit	Date	Map of circuit locations
1	R1	Madras International Circuit, Irungattukottai (Full layout)	4 November	2023 Indian Racing League is located in India
1	R2	Madras International Circuit, Irungattukottai (Full layout)	5 November	2023 Indian Racing League is located in India
2	R1	Madras International Circuit, Irungattukottai (Full layout)	1 December	2023 Indian Racing League is located in India
2	R2	Madras International Circuit, Irungattukottai (Full layout)	2 December	2023 Indian Racing League is located in India
3	R1	Madras International Circuit, Irungattukottai (Short layout)	9 December	2023 Indian Racing League is located in India
3	R2	Madras International Circuit, Irungattukottai (Short layout)	10 December	2023 Indian Racing League is located in India

=== Calendar changes ===
Duplicate rounds in Hyderabad and Irungattukottai were initially dropped in favour of new races at the Buddh International Circuit and a new street circuit around Island Grounds in Chennai. An updated calendar was released later on that dropped the planned round at Buddh International Circuit in favor of a second round at Irungattukottai. In the week leading up to the opening round, the first round was announced to also be moved to Irungattukottai because of the code of conduct surrounding elections in Telangana. Because of concerns regarding the arrival of Cyclone Michaung in the area, the penultimate round at Irungattukottai was postponed on short notice, with two more races to be added over the weekend at Chennai to compensate for it. This event did not come about, also because of the cyclone, with all races instead held at Madras. After six of the planned eight races were held over three weekends at Madras, the season was concluded early.

=== Format changes ===
Unlike the previous season, two qualifying sessions and two races were held per event – with the "feature race" including driver swaps discontinued. Two drivers were entered in each car, with each driver contesting one of the two event days – consisting of one 20-minute practice session, one 10-minute qualifying session and a 25-minute + 1 lap race per day.

== Season summary ==
The 2023 season began as the 2022 season left off – under a cloud of mismanagement, as the first round had to be relocated from the Hyderabad Street Circuit to the Madras International Circuit less than a week before the start of the season due to the knock-on effects of the 2023 Telangana Legislative Assembly election. The first race of the season was postponed by a day due to torrential rain, with Kochi's Ruhaan Alva claiming a lights-to-flag victory as Hyderabad's reigning champion Akhil Rabindra crashed with Alva's teammate Alister Yoong on the opening lap. Bangalore's Sarah Moore became the series' first female race winner in the wet second race, following both Goa's pole-sitter Sohil Shah and Kochi's Nikhil Bohra spinning out of the lead early in the race before Bohra punted Goa's Gabriela Jílková out of the race lead on the final lap.

The second round was heavily disrupted by bad weather - originally, the weekend was supposed to be a double round with four races, but after multiple delays, only two races were held. Goa's Raoul Hyman dominated the first day, claiming pole position by over 1.3 seconds and leading the first race from start to finish. Bangalore's Oliver Webb was his closest opposition, but did not attack him. Hyderabad's Akhil Rabindra came third. Bohra took pole position for the second race, where the start was aborted when Bangalore's Ashwin Datta stalled. Bohra pulled away at the restart, with only Chennai's Jon Lancaster managing to stay close to him, but the Brit was unable to get into the lead. Rabindra completed the podium, while Moore in fourth was able to consolidate a three-point championship lead over Lancaster and Sai Sanjay.

As Cyclone Michaung then hit India, the third round was relocated from Chennai to Madras. Shah earned pole position for the first race, defended his lead at the start and led until he made a mistake and ran off track. This promoted Bohra into the lead and he did not look back from then on, taking the win. Hyderabad's Anindith Reddy came second, while Lancaster had a brilliant race, starting last and finishing on the podium after overtaking Jílková at the final corner. Webb took pole position for the second race, but Hyman took the lead through the first corner. He held on all throughout the race to win, thereby allowing him and Shah to take the championship lead. Webb had to be content with second, while Hyderabad's Neel Jani came third. As the final two planned races of the season were cancelled, Hyman and Shah took the championship title.

While the season started with little information given by official sources regarding topics like the sporting format, coverage improved throughout the season. The heavy, short-term disruptions posed by the landfall of Cyclone Michaung were handled and communicated well. Still, the reduction from a planned eight-race schedule across three locations down to six races at a single venue hurt the championship, and a champion confirmed away from the track through cancellation of the rest of the rounds is never a good look.

== Results and standings ==
=== Results summary ===
Round		Circuit	Pole position	Fastest lap	Winning driver	Winning team
1	R1	Madras International Circuit	(India) Ruhaan Alva	(South Africa) Raoul Hyman	(India) Ruhaan Alva	Godspeed Kochi
1	R2	Madras International Circuit	(India) Sohil Shah	(India) Nikhil Bohra	(United Kingdom) Sarah Moore	Bangalore Speedsters
2	R1	Madras International Circuit	(South Africa) Raoul Hyman	(South Africa) Raoul Hyman	(South Africa) Raoul Hyman	Goa Aces
2	R2	Madras International Circuit	(India) Nikhil Bohra	(United Kingdom) Jon Lancaster	(India) Nikhil Bohra	Godspeed Kochi
3	R1	Madras International Circuit	(India) Sohil Shah	(India) Sohil Shah	(India) Nikhil Bohra	Godspeed Kochi
3	R2	Madras International Circuit	(United Kingdom) Oliver Webb	(South Africa) Raoul Hyman	(South Africa) Raoul Hyman	Goa Aces

=== Championship standings ===
==== Scoring system ====
Points are awarded to the top ten classified finishers as follows:

Race Position	**1st**	**2nd**	**3rd**	**4th**	**5th**	**6th**	**7th**	**8th**	**9th**	**10th**	**Pole**	**FL**
Points	25	18	15	12	10	8	6	4	2	1	1	1

Drivers sharing a car add the points they get in their respective races to a shared total.

==== Entrant championship ====
Pos	Entrant	Drivers	MIC1		MIC2		MIC3		Pts
Pos	Entrant	Drivers	R1	R2	R1	R2	R1	R2	Pts
1	No. 24 Goa Aces	(South Africa) Raoul Hyman	2		**1**			1	87
1	No. 24 Goa Aces	(India) Sohil Shah		**Ret**		6	**8**		87
2	No. 33 Chennai Turbo Riders	(United Kingdom) Jon Lancaster	3			2	3		83
2	No. 33 Chennai Turbo Riders	(India) Sai Sanjay		3	5			6	83
3	No. 2 Godspeed Kochi	(India) Nikhil Bohra		4		**1**	1		79
3	No. 2 Godspeed Kochi	(Malaysia) Alister Yoong	Ret		8			4	79
4	No. 70 Bangalore Speedsters	(India) Kyle Kumaran	5		3			5	78
4	No. 70 Bangalore Speedsters	(United Kingdom) Sarah Moore		1		4	7		78
5	No. 16 Bangalore Speedsters	(India) Ashwin Datta		6		DNS	10		58
5	No. 16 Bangalore Speedsters	(United Kingdom) Oliver Webb	4		2			**2**	58
6	No. 1 Hyderabad Blackbirds	(India) Akhil Rabindra	Ret	Ret		3	5		56
6	No. 1 Hyderabad Blackbirds	(Portugal) Álvaro Parente	WD^{1}						56
6	No. 1 Hyderabad Blackbirds	(Switzerland) Neel Jani			4			3	56
7	No. 7 Goa Aces	(Czech Republic) Gabriela Jílková		7	6		4		42
7	No. 7 Goa Aces	(India) Amir Sayed	7			8		7	42
8	No. 9 Hyderabad Blackbirds	(Spain) Laura Camps Torras		5	Ret			9	38
8	No. 9 Hyderabad Blackbirds	(India) Anindith Reddy	6			Ret	2		38
9	No. 5 Godspeed Kochi	(India) Ruhaan Alva	**1**			9	Ret		28
9	No. 5 Godspeed Kochi	(Liechtenstein) Fabienne Wohlwend		Ret	Ret			Ret	28
10	No. 18 Speed Demons Delhi	(Malaysia) Mitchell Gilbert		Ret		5		Ret	28
10	No. 18 Speed Demons Delhi	(India) Sandeep Kumar	8		7		6		28
11	No. 22 Speed Demons Delhi	(India) Akash Gowda	Ret	2		7	Ret		25
11	No. 22 Speed Demons Delhi	(United Kingdom) Chloe Chong			Ret			10	25
12	No. 6 Chennai Turbo Riders	(Canada) Nicole Havrda		Ret		10			7
12	No. 6 Chennai Turbo Riders	(India) Mohamed Ryan	Ret		Ret		9	8	7
Pos	Entrant	Drivers	R1	R2	R1	R2	R1	R2	Pts
Pos	Entrant	Drivers	MIC1		MIC2		MIC3		Pts

- **^1** – Parente qualified and Rabindra raced.

==== Teams' championship ====
Pos	Driver	MIC1		MIC2		MIC3		Pts
Pos	Driver	R1	R2	R1	R2	R1	R2	Pts
1	Bangalore Speedsters	4	1	2	5	7	**2**	136
1	Bangalore Speedsters	5	6	3	DNS	10	5	136
2	Goa Aces	2	7	**1**	6	4	1	129
2	Goa Aces	7	**Ret**	6	8	**8**	7	129
3	Godspeed Kochi	**1**	4	8	**1**	1	4	107
3	Godspeed Kochi	Ret	Ret	Ret	9	Ret	Ret	107
4	Chennai Turbo Riders	3	3	5	2	3	6	90
4	Chennai Turbo Riders	Ret	Ret	Ret	10	9	8	90
5	Hyderabad Blackbirds	6	5	4	4	2	3	89
5	Hyderabad Blackbirds	Ret	Ret	Ret	Ret	5	9	89
6	Speed Demons Delhi	8	2	7	3	6	10	58
6	Speed Demons Delhi	Ret	Ret	Ret	7	Ret	Ret	58
Pos	Driver	R1	R2	R1	R2	R1	R2	Pts
Pos	Driver	IRU1		IRU2		MIC3		Pts

Colour	Result
Gold	Winner
Silver	Second place
Bronze	Third place
Green	Points classification
Blue	Non-points classification
Blue	Non-classified finish (NC)
Purple	Retired, not classified (Ret)
Red	Did not qualify (DNQ)
Red	Did not pre-qualify (DNPQ)
Black	Disqualified (DSQ)
White	Did not start (DNS)
White	Withdrew (WD)
White	Race cancelled (C)
Blank	Did not practice (DNP)
Blank	Did not arrive (DNA)
Blank	Excluded (EX)

**Bold** – Pole

Italics – Fastest Lap
