= 2024 Indian Racing League =

Indian motor racing championship

The 2024 Indian Racing League was a single seater motor racing championship held across India. 2024 was the third season of the championship. It started on August 24 at Madras International Circuit and ran over five race weekends.

Raoul Hyman and Sohil Shah, sharing the No. 24 Goa Aces JA Racing car, defended their Entrant Championship at the final race of the season, while also winning the Teams' Championship, with Gabriela Jílková and Shahan Ali Mohsin driving the team's other car.

== Teams and drivers ==
All drivers competed with single-seater Wolf GB08 Thunder cars, fitted with a 215 bhp (160 kW) Aprilia engine.

Team	No.	Driver	Rounds
Rarh Bengal Tigers	2	(India) Nikhil Bohra	1–2, 4–5
Rarh Bengal Tigers	2	(India) Jaden Pariat	3
Rarh Bengal Tigers	2	(Malaysia) Alister Yoong	All
Rarh Bengal Tigers	5	(India) Ruhaan Alva	All
Rarh Bengal Tigers	5	(Liechtenstein) Fabienne Wohlwend	All
Speed Demons Delhi	6	(India) Akash Gowda	All
Speed Demons Delhi	6	(Portugal) Álvaro Parente	1–2, 4–5
Speed Demons Delhi	6	(Malaysia) Adam Khalid	3
Speed Demons Delhi	33	(Belgium) Angélique Detavernier	All
Speed Demons Delhi	33	(India) Sai Sanjay	All
Hyderabad Blackbirds	7	(Spain) Laura Camps Torras	All
Hyderabad Blackbirds	7	(India) Anindith Reddy	All
Hyderabad Blackbirds	9	(Switzerland) Neel Jani	1, 4–5
Hyderabad Blackbirds	9	(United Kingdom) Tom Canning	2–3
Hyderabad Blackbirds	9	(India) Akhil Rabindra	All
Goa Aces JA Racing	11	(Czech Republic) Gabriela Jílková	All
Goa Aces JA Racing	11	(India) Shahan Ali Mohsin	All
Goa Aces JA Racing	24	(South Africa) Raoul Hyman	All
Goa Aces JA Racing	24	(India) Sohil Shah	All
Chennai Turbo Riders	18	(Australia) Emily Duggan	1–2
Chennai Turbo Riders	18	(India) Mira Erda	3–5
Chennai Turbo Riders	18	(India) Sandeep Kumar	All
Chennai Turbo Riders	23	(United Kingdom) Jon Lancaster	All
Chennai Turbo Riders	23	(India) Mohamed Ryan	All
Bangalore Speedsters	25	(India) Rishon Rajeev	All
Bangalore Speedsters	25	(Australia) Caitlin Wood	All
Bangalore Speedsters	95	(Denmark) Julius Dinesen	All
Bangalore Speedsters	95	(India) Kyle Kumaran	All

=== Team changes ===
A new team joined the grid to replace 2022 teams' champions Godspeed Kochi. First announced under the guise of Kolkata Royal Tigers, it was later confirmed to be named Rarh Bengal Tigers. Indian actor and producer John Abraham acquired ownership of the Goa Aces team, renaming it to Goa Aces JA Racing.

=== Driver changes ===
The Bangalore Speedsters only retained a single driver in Kyle Kumaran as Ashwin Datta, Oliver Webb and Sarah Moore left the series. They were replaced by 2022 Danish F4 champion Julius Dinesen, Porsche Sprint Challenge GB driver Caitlin Wood and series returnee Rishon Rajeev, who had already competed for the team in 2022.

Amir Sayed left the Goa Aces team and was replaced by Shahan Ali Mohsin, who returned to the series after last competing in 2022 with the Speed Demons Delhi team.

The Chennai Turbo Riders replaced the departing Nicole Havrda and Delhi-bound Sai Sanjay with ex-Delhi driver Sandeep Kumar and Emily Duggan, who last competed in 2019 in the Australian Toyota 86 Racing and Super3 series.

Speed Demons Delhi welcomed three new drivers to their team as Sandeep Kumar moved to the Chennai Turbo Riders and Mitchell Gilbert and Chloe Chong left the championship. They were replaced by Álvaro Parente, who had entered the opening event in 2023 with the Hyderabad Blackbirds, Sai Sanjay, who swapped teams with Kumar, and Belgian GT4 driver Angélique Detavernier, who made her series debut.

New entry Rarh Bengal Tigers took on all four drivers of Godspeed Kochi, the team it replaced.

==== Mid-season ====
GT driver Tom Canning returned to the championship to sub for Neel Jani, who was absent from rounds 2 and 3 because of his clashing WEC commitments.

Three more driver changes happened for round three: Jaden Pariat subbed for Nikhil Bohra, who prioritized his FRECA campaign, Mira Erda replaced Emily Duggan at Chennai Turbo Riders and Adam Khalid replaced Álvaro Parente at Speed Demons Delhi. Parente and Bohra returned for the final two rounds at Kari Motor Speedway.

== Race calendar ==
The provisional calendar was announced in late February of 2024, albeit without any confirmed venues. The venue of the first three rounds were later confirmed to be the Madras International Circuit in Irungattukottai, the new Chennai Formula Racing Circuit in Chennai and Kari Motor Speedway in Coimbatore. The second round was then relocated to be also held at Madras, with Kari hosting rounds 4 and 5. All events were held in India and were run in tandem with the F4 Indian Championship. The event format remained unchanged from the 2023 season.

No.		Circuit	Date	Map of circuit locations
1	R1	Madras International Circuit, Irungattukottai	24 August	2024 Indian Racing League is located in India
1	R2	Madras International Circuit, Irungattukottai	25 August	2024 Indian Racing League is located in India
2	R1	Chennai Formula Racing Circuit, Chennai	1 September	2024 Indian Racing League is located in India
2	R2	Chennai Formula Racing Circuit, Chennai	1 September	2024 Indian Racing League is located in India
3	R1	Madras International Circuit, Irungattukottai	14 September	2024 Indian Racing League is located in India
3	R2	Madras International Circuit, Irungattukottai	15 September	2024 Indian Racing League is located in India
4	R1	Kari Motor Speedway, Chettipalayam	19 October	2024 Indian Racing League is located in India
4	R2	Kari Motor Speedway, Chettipalayam	20 October	2024 Indian Racing League is located in India
5	R1	Kari Motor Speedway, Chettipalayam	16 November	2024 Indian Racing League is located in India
5	R2	Kari Motor Speedway, Chettipalayam	17 November	2024 Indian Racing League is located in India

== Race results ==
No.		Circuit	Pole position	Fastest lap	Winning driver	Winning team
1	R1	Madras International Circuit	(India) Ruhaan Alva	(India) Ruhaan Alva	(United Kingdom) Jon Lancaster	Chennai Turbo Riders
1	R2	Madras International Circuit	(Malaysia) Alister Yoong	(India) Sohil Shah	(Malaysia) Alister Yoong	Rarh Bengal Tigers
2	R1	Chennai Formula Racing Circuit	(Czech Republic) Gabriela Jílková	(South Africa) Raoul Hyman	(South Africa) Raoul Hyman	Goa Aces JA Racing
2	R2	Chennai Formula Racing Circuit	(Portugal) Álvaro Parente	(Portugal) Álvaro Parente	(Portugal) Álvaro Parente	Speed Demons Delhi
3	R1	Madras International Circuit	(India) Ruhaan Alva	(India) Ruhaan Alva	(United Kingdom) Jon Lancaster	Chennai Turbo Riders
3	R2	Madras International Circuit	(India) Mohamed Ryan	(India) Mohamed Ryan	(India) Mohamed Ryan	Chennai Turbo Riders
4	R1	Kari Motor Speedway	(Switzerland) Neel Jani	(Switzerland) Neel Jani	(United Kingdom) Jon Lancaster	Chennai Turbo Riders
4	R2	Kari Motor Speedway	(South Africa) Raoul Hyman	(South Africa) Raoul Hyman	(South Africa) Raoul Hyman	Goa Aces JA Racing
5	R1	Kari Motor Speedway	(India) Sohil Shah	(India) Sohil Shah	(India) Sohil Shah	Goa Aces JA Racing
5	R2	Kari Motor Speedway	(South Africa) Raoul Hyman	(South Africa) Raoul Hyman	(South Africa) Raoul Hyman	Goa Aces JA Racing

== Season report ==
The 2024 Indian Racing League opened at Madras International Circuit with Rarh Bengal Tigers driver Ruhaan Alva on pole position for the first race. He dropped to fifth after going off at the start of the race, handing Chennai Turbo Riders driver Jon Lancaster the lead before he too ran wide and Hyderabad Blackbirds’ Neel Jani claimed first place. He looked set to win the race before retiring with a car issue on the final lap. That saw Lancaster claim the win ahead of Speed Demons Delhi’s Álvaro Parente and pole sitter Alva. Race two saw Rarh Bengal Tigers’ Alister Yoong lead Hyderabad Blackbirds’ Akhil Rabindra and Goa Aces JA Racing’s Gabriela Jílková to an unchallenged lights-to-flag win.

Round two saw the debut of the Chennai Formula Racing Circuit. After significant delays due to circuit modifications mandated by the FIA, Jílková qualified on pole position for the first race. Goa Aces JA Racing’s Raoul Hyman took the lead, before the race was interrupted by a dog entering the track. Hyman held his lead at the restart to win the race, while Yoong took third. Parente took pole position for the second race and led every lap despite continuous pressure from Goa Aces JA Racing’s Sohil Shah. Parente took the win by 0.9 seconds as Alva claimed third. That result saw the Rarh Bengal Tigers, who had finished on the podium at every race up to that point, cement their championship lead.

The series returned to Madras International Circuit for its third round, and Alva once again claimed pole position in his group. Yoong started second but dropped to fourth at the start, behind Lancaster and Jílková. Alva looked set to win until he suffered a technical issue on the final lap and dropped to third, handing Lancaster the win and Jílková second place. Chennai Turbo Riders driver Mohamed Ryan took pole position for the second race. He led Shah all race and took a comfortable lights-to-flag victory. Bangalore Speedsters driver Rishon Rajeev held off Jaden Pariat, who subbed for Nikhil Bohra at the Rarh Bengal Tigers, for third place. Still, the Tigers continued to lead the championship.

The Indian Racing League debuted at Kari Motor Speedway for round four. Jani claimed pole position for the first race and built a gap of five seconds, before he was hit by gearbox issues. Lancaster closed up and passed him, before Jani got on top of his issues and attacked back. Lancaster was able to hold on to the lead and claim the victory, with Shah finishing in third. The second day of competition was dominated by Hyman, who took pole position, led every lap, claimed the fastest lap and won the race. Alva claimed second, while Parente was handed third when Jílková struggled with a car issue. Round four saw the Goa Aces close up to the Rarh Bengal Tigers in the championship.

The final round, also held at Kari Motor Speedway, began with a pole position for Shah. He followed that up with a lights-to-flag victory ahead of Jani and Parente. Shah also took the fastest lap for the maximum points, allowing his Goa Aces team to claim the lead of the Teams’ Championship by two points heading into the final race. That race was started by Hyman on pole position before Alva collided with Speed Demons Delhi driver Akash Gowda. The Goa Aces pair of Hyman and Jílková flew in formation afterwards to secure a 1-2 finish ahead of Bangalore Speedsters' Julius Dinesen. With that, they claimed both the Teams’ Championship and the Entrant Championship for Hyman's and Shah's No. 24.

== Championship standings ==
=== Scoring system ===
Points were awarded to the top ten classified finishers as follows:

Race Position	**1st**	**2nd**	**3rd**	**4th**	**5th**	**6th**	**7th**	**8th**	**9th**	**10th**	**Pole**	**FL**
Points	25	18	15	12	10	8	6	4	2	1	1	1

Drivers sharing a car added the points they earned in their respective races to a shared total.

=== Entrant championship ===
Pos	Entrant	Drivers	MIC1		CHE		MIC2		KAR1		KAR2		Pts
Pos	Entrant	Drivers	R1	R2	R1^{1}	R2	R1	R2	R1	R2	R1	R2	Pts
1	No. 24 Goa Aces JA Racing	(South Africa) Raoul Hyman	Ret		1		5			**1**		**1**	167
1	No. 24 Goa Aces JA Racing	(India) Sohil Shah		8		4		2	3		**1**		167
2	No. 23 Chennai Turbo Riders	(United Kingdom) Jon Lancaster	1		Ret		1		1		4		147
2	No. 23 Chennai Turbo Riders	(India) Mohamed Ryan		6		7		**1**		10		4	147
3	No. 5 Rarh Bengal Tigers	(India) Ruhaan Alva	**3**			3	**3**			2		Ret	123
3	No. 5 Rarh Bengal Tigers	(Liechtenstein) Fabienne Wohlwend		4	4			5	4		6		123
4	No. 2 Rarh Bengal Tigers	(India) Nikhil Bohra	5			DNS			6		8		97
4	No. 2 Rarh Bengal Tigers	(India) Jaden Pariat						4					97
4	No. 2 Rarh Bengal Tigers	(Malaysia) Alister Yoong		**1**	3		4			DNS		7	97
5	No. 11 Goa Aces JA Racing	(Czech Republic) Gabriela Jílková		3	**2**		2			7		2	94
5	No. 11 Goa Aces JA Racing	(India) Shahan Ali Mohsin	8			Ret		6	Ret		5		94
6	No. 6 Speed Demons Delhi	(India) Akash Gowda		Ret	Ret		7		8			Ret	82
6	No. 6 Speed Demons Delhi	(Portugal) Álvaro Parente	2			**1**				3	3		82
6	No. 6 Speed Demons Delhi	(Malaysia) Adam Khalid						Ret					82
7	No. 25 Bangalore Speedsters	(India) Rishon Rajeev	6			2		3		5		5	79
7	No. 25 Bangalore Speedsters	(Australia) Caitlin Wood		Ret	5		8		9		Ret		79
8	No. 9 Hyderabad Blackbirds	(United Kingdom) Tom Canning			DNS		10						73
8	No. 9 Hyderabad Blackbirds	(Switzerland) Neel Jani	Ret						**2**		2		73
8	No. 9 Hyderabad Blackbirds	(India) Akhil Rabindra		2		6		Ret		6		Ret	73
9	No. 95 Bangalore Speedsters	(Denmark) Julius Dinesen		5		8	6			4		3	46
9	No. 95 Bangalore Speedsters	(India) Kyle Kumaran	Ret		Ret			Ret	Ret		7		46
10	No. 7 Hyderabad Blackbirds	(Spain) Laura Camps Torras	7		6		DNS			9	10		45
10	No. 7 Hyderabad Blackbirds	(India) Anindith Reddy		9		Ret		7	5			6	45
11	No. 33 Speed Demons Delhi	(Belgium) Angélique Detavernier		7	DSQ		11			Ret		9	36
11	No. 33 Speed Demons Delhi	(India) Sai Sanjay	4			5		DNS	7		Ret		36
12	No. 18 Chennai Turbo Riders	(Australia) Emily Duggan		10		9							19
12	No. 18 Chennai Turbo Riders	(India) Mira Erda					9		Ret			8	19
12	No. 18 Chennai Turbo Riders	(India) Sandeep Kumar	Ret		Ret			8		8	9		19
Pos	Entrant	Drivers	R1	R2	R1	R2	R1	R2	R1	R2	R1	R2	Pts
Pos	Entrant	Drivers	MIC1		CHE		MIC2		KAR1		KAR2		Pts

- **^1** – Full race results were not made publicly available.

Colour	Result
Gold	Winner
Silver	Second place
Bronze	Third place
Green	Points classification
Blue	Non-points classification
Blue	Non-classified finish (NC)
Purple	Retired, not classified (Ret)
Red	Did not qualify (DNQ)
Red	Did not pre-qualify (DNPQ)
Black	Disqualified (DSQ)
White	Did not start (DNS)
White	Withdrew (WD)
White	Race cancelled (C)
Blank	Did not practice (DNP)
Blank	Did not arrive (DNA)
Blank	Excluded (EX)

**Bold** – Pole

Italics – Fastest Lap

=== Teams' championship ===
Pos	Team	MIC1		CHE		MIC2		KAR1		KAR2		Pts
Pos	Team	R1	R2	R1	R2	R1	R2	R1	R2	R1	R2	Pts
1	Goa Aces JA Racing	8	3	1	4	2	2	3	**1**	**1**	**1**	261
1	Goa Aces JA Racing	Ret	8	**2**	Ret	5	6	Ret	7	5	2	261
2	Rarh Bengal Tigers	**3**	**1**	3	3	**3**	4	4	2	6	7	220
2	Rarh Bengal Tigers	5	4	4	DNS	4	5	6	DNS	8	Ret	220
3	Chennai Turbo Riders	1	6	Ret	7	1	**1**	1	8	4	4	166
3	Chennai Turbo Riders	Ret	10	Ret	9	9	8	Ret	10	9	8	166
4	Bangalore Speedsters	6	5	5	2	6	3	9	4	7	3	125
4	Bangalore Speedsters	Ret	Ret	Ret	8	8	Ret	Ret	5	Ret	5	125
5	Speed Demons Delhi	2	7	Ret	**1**	7	Ret	7	3	3	9	118
5	Speed Demons Delhi	4	Ret	Ret	5	11	DNS	8	Ret	Ret	Ret	118
6	Hyderabad Blackbirds	7	2	6	6	10	7	**2**	6	2	6	118
6	Hyderabad Blackbirds	Ret	9	DNS	Ret	DNS	Ret	5	9	10	Ret	118
Pos	Team	R1	R2	R1	R2	R1	R2	R1	R2	R1	R2	Pts
Pos	Team	MIC1		CHE		MIC2		KAR1		KAR2		Pts
