= Jem Hepworth =

British racing driver (born 2000)

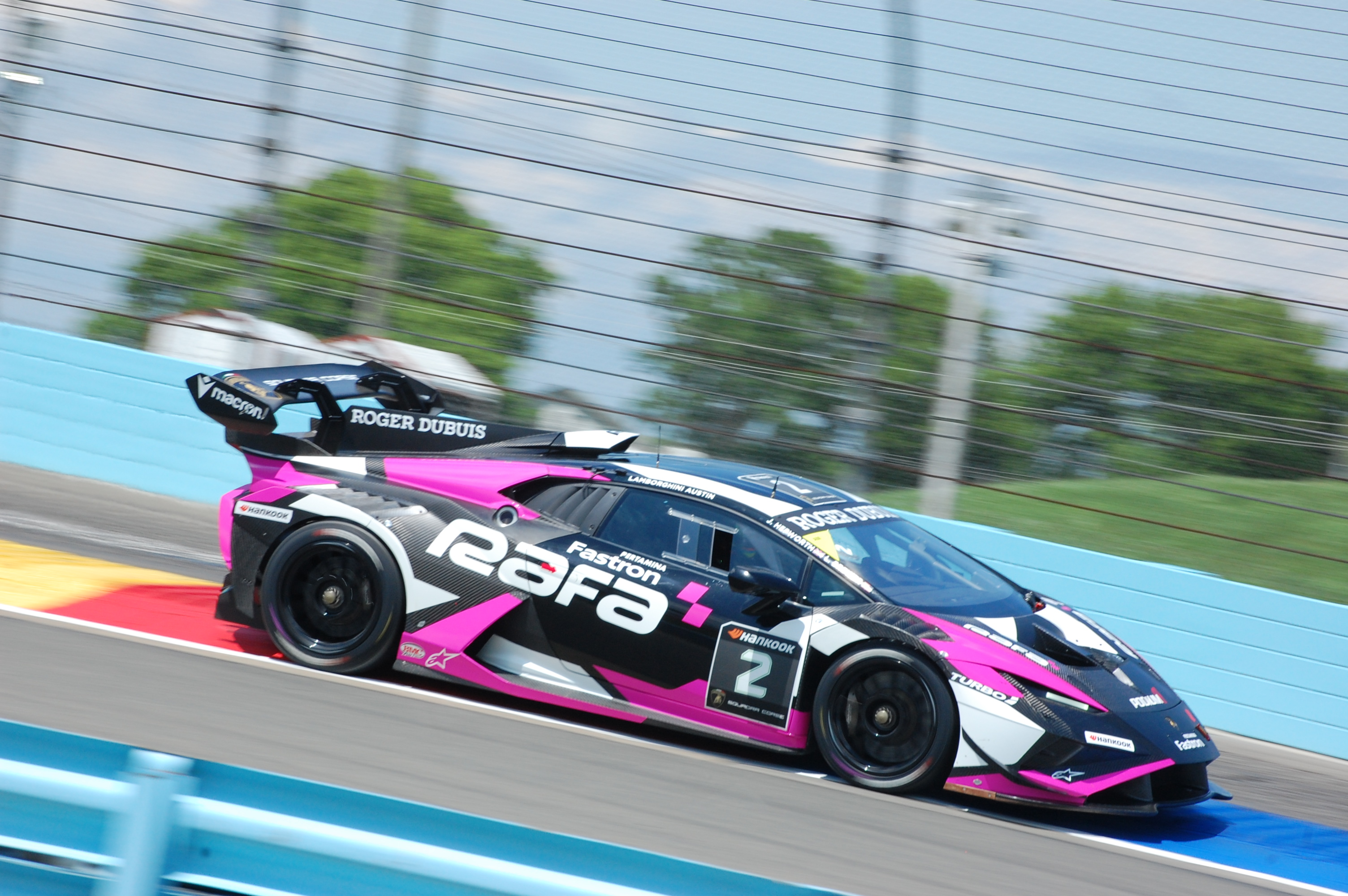
- Hepworth in 2025
- Nationality: (United Kingdom) British
- Born: 10 December 2000 (age 25) Exeter, England
- Categorisation: FIA Silver

Jemima Hepworth (born 10 December 2000) is a British racing driver who competes in the Indian Racing League for Kolkata Royal Tigers.

== Career ==
Hepworth began racing quad bikes at the age of seven, before switching to karts in 2012. During her karting career, Hepworth was awarded the Dunlop Trophy by Mansell Kart Club for her achievements in motorsport in 2019, as well as participating in the FIA's Girls on Track Karting Challenge, also that year.

During 2019, Hepworth made her car racing debut in the Citroën C1 Endurance Challenge at Silverstone, as well as competing in the BRSCC Fiesta Junior Championship. The following year, Hepworth joined VR Motorsport with Fox Transport to compete in the Britcar Endurance Championship, taking four wins and two other podiums to seal the overall and Class 1 titles alongside Danny Harrison. In 2021, Hepworth switched to Team J2 Praga alongside Jimmy Broadbent, before partaking in the W Series pre-season tests and the Heart of Racing Team female shootout the following year.

In 2023, Hepworth joined Greystone GT to race in the newly-formed McLaren Trophy Europe alongside RAFA Racing team owner Rafael Martínez, missing out on the 570 title after the car broke down on the final lap while running third. Joining Martínez's team for 2024, Hepworth switched to the GT4 European Series, sharing a McLaren Artura GT4 with Cameron Lawrence. Competing in the Silver Cup, Hepworth took a best result of fourth in race two at Spa, as well as two other points finishes to end the year 19th in points.

Moving stateside for 2025, Hepworth continued with RAFA Racing to make her debut in Lamborghini Super Trofeo North America. Racing alongside Lindsay Brewer in the Am class, Hepworth won at Road America and Vallelunga and took five other podiums to secure runner-up honours in class. At the end of 2025, Hepworth joined Kichcha's Kings Bengaluru to compete in the 2025–26 Indian Racing League alongside Kyle Kumaran, taking a best result of sixth at the Goa finale to help the team finish eighth in points. For the rest of 2026, Hepworth returned to RAFA Racing Team to step up to the Pro class of the Lamborghini Super Trofeo North America with Tatiana Calderón, but her campaign lasted two rounds before an injury sidelined her for the remainder of the season. Towards the end of the year, Hepworth joined Kolkata Royal Tigers to return to the Indian Racing League.

== Karting record ==
=== Karting career summary ===
Season	Series	Team	Position
2015	Super One Series — Mini Max		26th
2019	British Kart Championship — Rotax Senior		23rd

== Racing record ==
=== Racing career summary ===
Season	Series	Team	Races	Wins	Poles	F/Laps	Podiums	Points	Position
2019	Citroën C1 Endurance Challenge								
2019	BRSCC Fiesta Junior Championship								
2020	Britcar Endurance Championship – Class 1	VR Motorsport with Fox Transport	7	4	0	0	6	213‡	**1st‡**
2021	Britcar Endurance Championship – Praga	Team J2 Praga	7	0	0	0	0	171‡	5th‡
2021	Britcar Endurance Championship – Praga Invitational	VR Motorsport	1	0	0	0	0	0†	NC†
2022	Praga Cup	Arden by Idola	2	0	0	0	0	56	13th
2022	Praga Cup	Idola Motorsport	2	0	0	0	0	56	13th
2023	McLaren Trophy Europe – 570	Greystone GT							**3rd**
2024	GT4 European Series – Silver	RAFA Racing Club	10	0	0	0	0	14	19th
2025	Lamborghini Super Trofeo North America – Am	RAFA Racing Team	12	2	0	0	7	124	**2nd**
2025	Mazda MX-5 Cup	RAFA Racing Team by MMR	2	0	0	0	0	200	49th
2025–26	Indian Racing League	Kichcha's Kings Bengaluru	4	0	0	0	0	53‡	8th‡
2026	Lamborghini Super Trofeo North America – Pro	RAFA Racing Team	4	0	0	0	0	8	21st
2026	Indian Racing League	Kolkata Royal Tigers						‡*	‡*

^{†} As Hepworth was a guest driver, she was ineligible to score points.

^{‡} Team standings.

=== Complete GT4 European Series results ===
(key) (Races in bold indicate pole position) (Races in italics indicate fastest lap)

Year	Team	Car	Class	1	2	3	4	5	6	7	8	9	10	11	12	Pos	Points
2024	RAFA Racing Club	McLaren Artura GT4	Silver	LEC; 1; 31†	LEC; 2; 15	MIS; 1; 17	MIS; 2 Ret	SPA; 1; 11	SPA; 2; 4	HOC; 1; 39†	HOC; 2; 20	MNZ; 1; 10	MNZ; 2; 23	JED; 1	JED; 2	19th	14
