= Kyle Kumaran =

Indian racing driver

Kyle Aditya Kumaran is a racing driver of Indian Origin from the state of Tamil Nadu based in Dubai, UAE. He is the Vice World Champion (DD2 Category) in Rotax Grand Final at Bahrain held on 18 Dec 2021. He is currently the only Indian to have won a trophy at a world karting event. He won the Senior Max title in the Meco FMSCI National Karting Chamship Rotax Max class 2021 at the Meco Kartopia Track in November. Kumaran also won the Middle East and North Africa (MENA) Nations Cup in DD2 class.

== Career ==
=== Karting career summary ===
Season	Series	Position
2018	SWS World Finals – Junior	?
2018	IAME International – Senior	?
2019	British Grand Prix – Senior	?
2019	Rotax International Trophy – DD2	?
2019	Rotax Max Challenge Grand Finals – DD2	?
2021	MENA Karting Championship – DD2	1st
2021	Indian Karting Championships – Rotax Max Senior	1st
2021	RMC Grand Finals – DD2	2nd
2022	RMCIT	4th

=== UAE Championships ===
- Champion – Junior, Sodi World Series (SWS) 2017
- Champion – MAX (Senior), RMC 2017-18
- Champion ( x2 )
- DD2, RMC 2019-20 & 2021-22
- Champion ( x2 ) – Senior, SWS 2020 & 2021
- Champion ( x2 ) – Endurance, SWS 2020 & 2021
- Champion – Senior, IAME Summer Series 2021
- Champion – DD2, Dubai O Plate 2022
- Vice Champion – Junior, IAME X30 2017-18
- Vice Champion – DD2 RMC 2018-19
- 3rd – Senior, IAME X30 2018-19
- 3rd – Senior, IAME X30 2021-22
- 3rd – Senior, IAME X30 Middle East Cup 2021
- 4th – Senior, IAME X30 2019-20
- 5th - 2018 (Junior) & 2019 (Senior), Dubai O Plate

== Racing record ==
=== Racing career summary ===
Season	Series	Team	Races	Wins	Poles	F/Laps	Podiums	Points	Position
2022	Formula 4 UAE Championship	Mumbai Falcons by Xcel	4	0	0	0	0	0	38th
2022-23	MRF Formula 2000	MRF Racing	2	0	0	0	0	2	11th
2023	Indian Racing League	Bangalore Speedsters	3	0	0	0	1	78‡	4th‡
2024	Indian Racing League	Bangalore Speedsters	5	0	0	0	0	46‡	9th‡
2025	Indian Racing League	Kichcha's Kings Bengaluru							

‡ Team standings

=== Complete Formula 4 UAE Championship results ===
(key) (Races in bold indicate pole position) (Races in italics indicate fastest lap)

Year	Team	1	2	3	4	5	6	7	8	9	10	11	12	13	14	15	16	17	18	19	20	DC	Points
2022	Mumbai Falcons by Xcel	YAS1; 1	YAS1; 2	YAS1; 3	YAS1; 4	DUB1; 1	DUB1; 2	DUB1; 3	DUB1; 4	DUB2; 1	DUB2; 2	DUB2; 3	DUB2; 4	DUB3; 1	DUB3; 2	DUB3; 3	DUB3; 4	YAS2; 1; 24	YAS2; 2; 22	YAS2; 3; 23	YAS2; 4; 19	38th	0

=== Complete Indian Racing League results ===
(key) (Races in bold indicate pole position) (Races in italics indicate fastest lap)

Year	Franchise	1	2	3	4	5	6	7	8	9	10	Pos.	Pts
2023‡	Bangalore Speedsters	IRU1; 1; 5	IRU1; 2	IRU2; 1; 3	IRU2; 2	IRU3; 1	IRU3; 2; 5					4th	78
2024‡	Bangalore Speedsters	IRU1; 1 Ret	IRU1; 2	IGR; 1 Ret	IGR; 2	IRU2; 1	IRU2; 2 Ret	KAR1; 1 Ret	KAR1; 2	KAR2; 1; 7	KAR2; 2	9th	46

‡ Standings based on entry points, not individual drivers.

* Season in progress.
