= Nikhil Bohra =

Indian and American racing driver (born 2005)

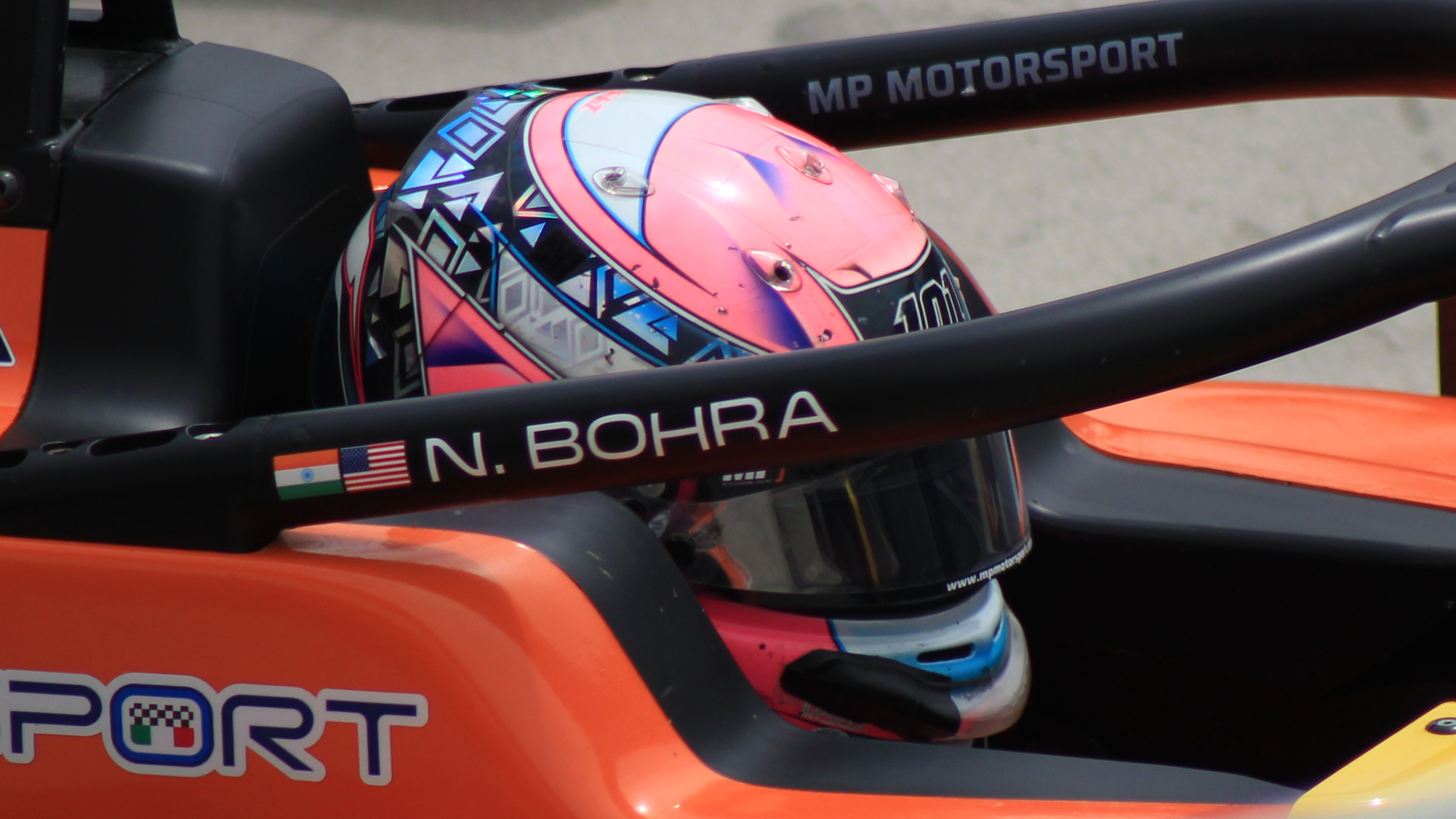
- Bohra in 2024
- Nationality: (India) Indian (United States) American
- Born: 25 January 2005 (age 21) New York City, United States
- Relatives: Akshay Bohra (brother)

Formula Regional European Championship career
- Debut season: 2023
- Current team: MP Motorsport
- Car number: 47
- Former teams: Trident Racing
- Starts: 40 (40 entries)
- Wins: 0
- Podiums: 1
- Poles: 0
- Fastest laps: 0
- Best finish: 22nd in 2023

Previous series
- 2022 2022 2021–2022: Italian F4; Indian Racing League; ADAC Formula 4

Nikhil Bohra (born 25 January 2005) is an Indian and American racing driver who most recently competed in the 2024 Formula Regional European Championship for MP Motorsport.

Bohra is the older brother of Akshay Bohra, who is also a racing driver.

== Career ==
=== Formula 4 ===
==== 2021 ====
Bohra made his single-seater debut at the end of 2021, where he competed in the ADAC F4 season finale at the Nürburgring with R-ace GP.

==== 2022 ====
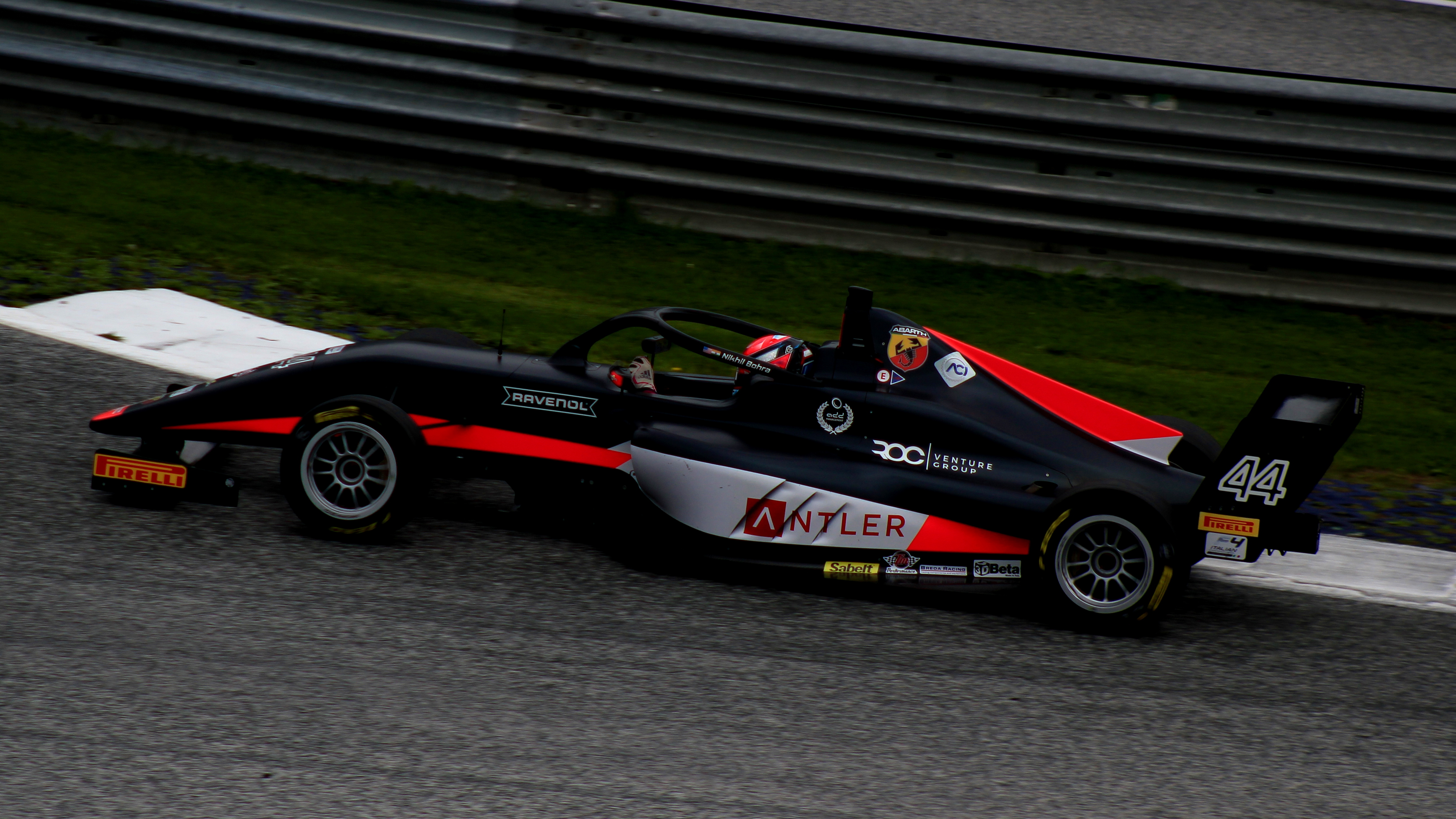
Bohra driving at the Red Bull Ring during the 2022 Italian F4 Championship

Continuing on in 2022, Bohra would plant himself into the Italian F4 Championship on a full-time basis, driving for US Racing alongside Alex Dunne, Kacper Sztuka, Marcus Amand and Pedro Perino. His season began slowly, as the opening two rounds yielded no points. However, the third event at Spa-Francorchamps would prove to be successful, with Bohra taking his first points finishes, which included a sixth place in Race 2. More points followed at Vallelunga, before Bohra scored his season-best result of fourth at the Red Bull Ring, a race in which he would also score his maiden rookie podium. He finished off his season with a pair of seventh places in Mugello, which elevated him to 13th in the main standings.

That year, Bohra also competed in the first two rounds of the ADAC F4 Championship, where he scored ten points.

Bohra also won the Indian Racing League team's championship, alongside Fabienne Wohlwend, Ruhaan Alva, and Alister Yoong, securing two pole positions and two wins for Godspeed Kochi.

=== Formula Regional ===
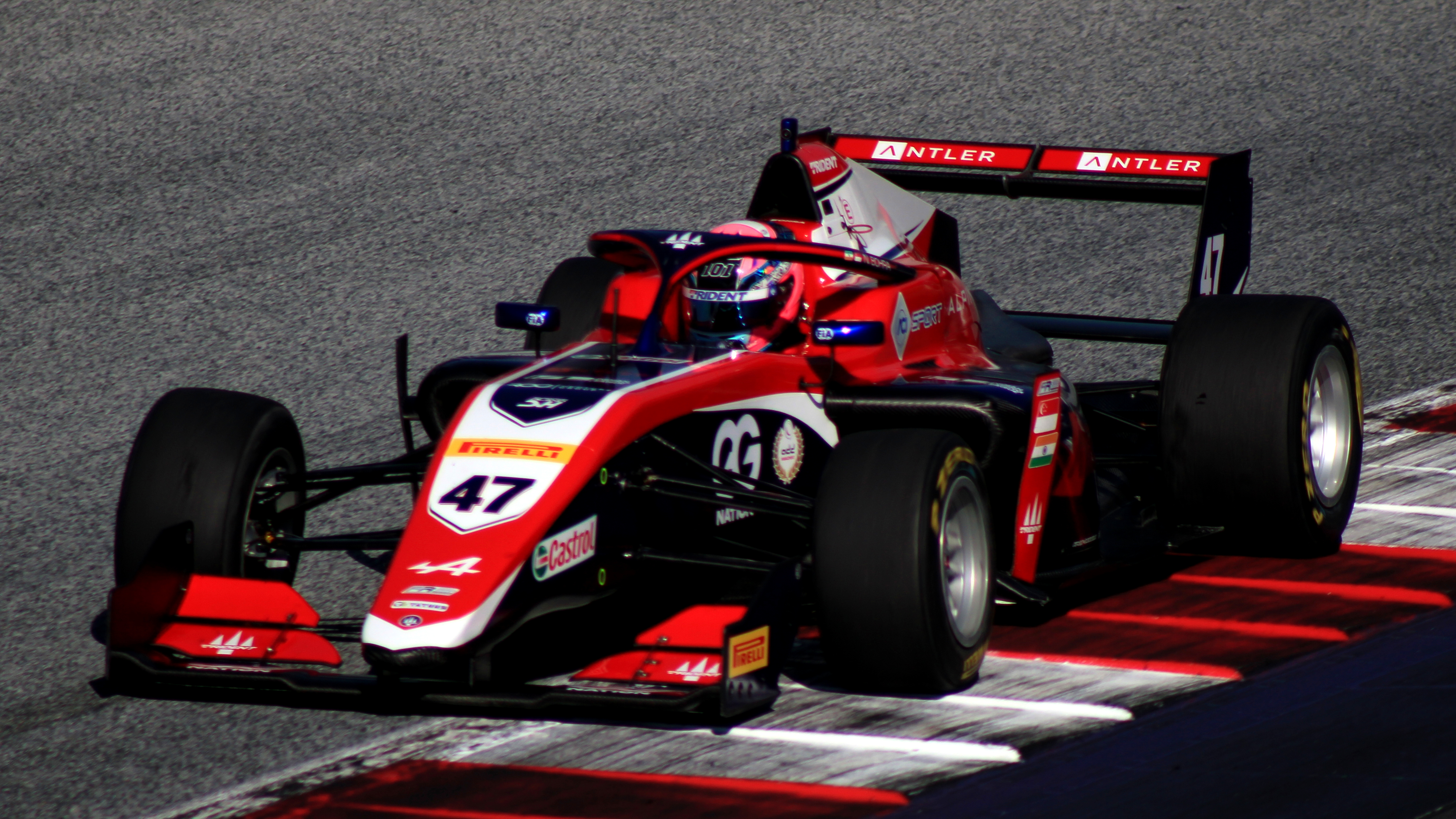
Bohra racing in the 2023 Formula Regional European Championship at the Red Bull Ring.

==== 2023 ====
Bohra made his debut in the 2023 Formula Regional Middle East Championship (FRMEC) with R-ace GP, winning Race 2 in Dubai, and finishing on the podium in Kuwait. He finished ninth in the overall championship, and 4th in the rookie standings.

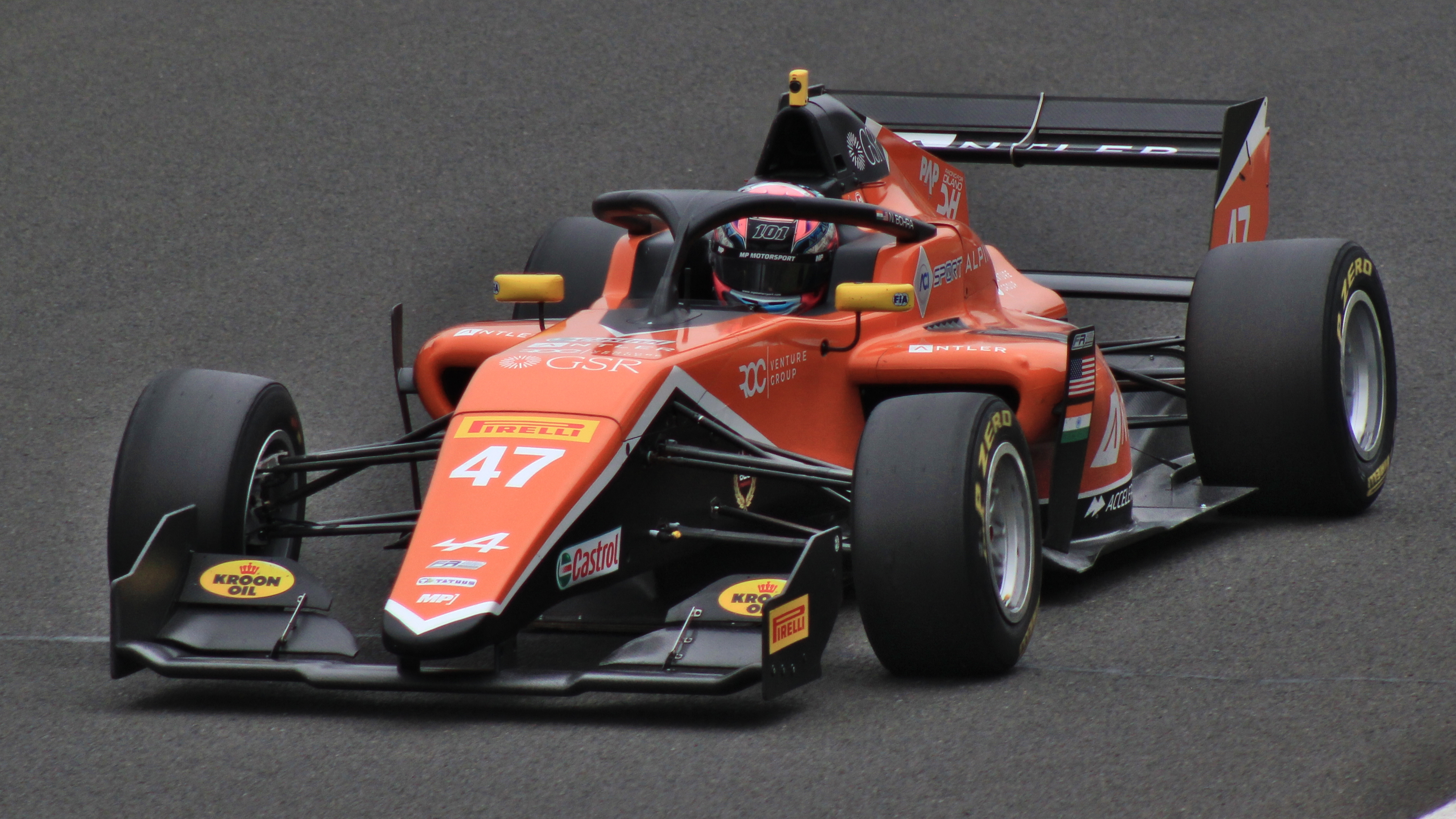
Bohra driving at the Hungaroring during the 2024 Formula Regional European Championship

Bohra then made the jump up to the 2023 Formula Regional European Championship with Trident. He finished on the podium in the first round in Imola.

==== 2024 ====
Bohra returned to the 2024 Formula Regional Middle East Championship with MP Motorsport.

That year, Bohra contested the Formula Regional European Championship with MP Motorsport.

=== Touring cars ===
==== 2025 ====
Bohra pivoted to touring cars, competing in the 2025 season of the revived Malaysian Touring Car Championship.

== Personal life ==
Although born in New York City, Bohra spent his early years in Bengaluru, India before relocating to Singapore. He represented Singapore in motorsport until 2023. Bohra is currently pursuing a mathematics and economics degree at Columbia University.

== Karting record ==
=== Karting career summary ===
Season	Series	Team	Position
2019	IAME Asia Cup - Junior	I.S Racing	1st
2019	IAME Series Asia - Senior	I.S Racing	4th
2019	IAME Asia Final - Junior	I.S Racing	5th
2020	IAME Asia Cup – X30 Senior	I.S Racing	

== Racing record ==
=== Racing career summary ===
Season	Series	Team	Races	Wins	Poles	F/Laps	Podiums	Points	Position
2021	ADAC Formula 4 Championship	R-ace GP	3	0	0	0	0	0	22nd
2022	Formula 4 UAE Championship	3Y by R-ace GP	20	0	0	0	0	17	20th
2022	Italian F4 Championship	US Racing	20	0	0	0	0	47	13th
2022	ADAC Formula 4 Championship	US Racing	6	0	0	0	0	10	16th
2022	Indian Racing League	Godspeed Kochi	6	2	2	1	3	118	4th
2023	Formula Regional Middle East Championship	R-ace GP	15	1	0	1	2	73	9th
2023	Formula Regional European Championship	Trident	20	0	0	0	1	56	12th
2023	Indian Racing League	Godspeed Kochi	3	2	1	1	2	79‡	**3rd‡**
2024	Formula Regional Middle East Championship	MP Motorsport	15	1	0	0	1	49	12th
2024	Formula Regional European Championship	MP Motorsport	20	0	0	0	0	2	22nd
2024	Indian Racing League	Rarh Bengal Tigers	3	0	0	0	0	97‡	4th‡

* Season still in progress.

‡ Team standings.

=== Complete ADAC Formula 4 Championship results ===
(key) (Races in bold indicate pole position) (Races in italics indicate fastest lap)

Year	Team	1	2	3	4	5	6	7	8	9	10	11	12	13	14	15	16	17	18	DC	Points
2021	R-ace GP	RBR; 1	RBR; 2	RBR; 3	ZAN; 1	ZAN; 2	ZAN; 3	HOC1; 1	HOC1; 2	HOC1; 3	SAC; 1	SAC; 2	SAC; 3	HOC2; 1	HOC2; 2	HOC2; 3	NÜR; 1; 14	NÜR; 2; 12	NÜR; 3 Ret	22nd	0
2022	US Racing	SPA; 1; 7	SPA; 2 Ret	SPA; 3; 12	HOC; 1; 12	HOC; 2 Ret	HOC; 3; 14	ZAN; 1	ZAN; 2	ZAN; 3	NÜR1; 1	NÜR1; 2	NÜR1; 3	LAU; 1	LAU; 2	LAU; 3	NÜR2; 1	NÜR2; 2	NÜR2; 3	16th	10

=== Complete Formula 4 UAE Championship results ===
(key) (Races in bold indicate pole position) (Races in italics indicate fastest lap)

Year	Team	1	2	3	4	5	6	7	8	9	10	11	12	13	14	15	16	17	18	19	20	DC	Points
2022	3Y by R-ace GP	YMC1; 1; 15	YMC1; 2 Ret	YMC1; 3 Ret	YMC1; 4; 14	DUB1; 1; 14	DUB1; 2; 17	DUB1; 3; 14	DUB1; 4; 25	DUB2; 1 Ret	DUB2; 2; 7	DUB2; 3; 16	DUB2; 4; 12	DUB3; 1 Ret	DUB3; 2; 26	DUB3; 3; 29	DUB3; 4; 24	YMC2; 1; 14	YMC2; 2; 18	YMC2; 3; 10	YMC2; 4; 5	20th	17

=== Complete Italian F4 Championship results ===
(key) (Races in bold indicate pole position) (Races in italics indicate fastest lap)

Year	Team	1	2	3	4	5	6	7	8	9	10	11	12	13	14	15	16	17	18	19	20	21	22	DC	Points
2022	US Racing	IMO; 1; 13	IMO; 2; 15	IMO; 3 Ret	MIS; 1; 11	MIS; 2; 16	MIS; 3; 21	SPA; 1; 9	SPA; 2; 6	SPA; 3; 10	VLL; 1; 15	VLL; 2 Ret	VLL; 3; 7	RBR; 1; 4	RBR; 2	RBR; 3; 7	RBR; 4; 12	MNZ; 1; 34†	MNZ; 2; 26	MNZ; 3 C	MUG; 1; 7	MUG; 2; 11	MUG; 3; 7	13th	47

=== Complete Indian Racing League results ===
(key) (Races in bold indicate pole position) (Races in italics indicate fastest lap)

Year	Franchise	1	2	3	4	5	6	7	8	9	10	11	12	Pos.	Pts
2022	Godspeed Kochi	HYD1; 1 C	HYD1; 2 C	HYD1; 3 C	IRU1; 1	IRU1; 2 Ret	IRU1; 3 Ret	**IRU2**; **1**	IRU2; 2; 3	IRU2; 3; 4	**HYD2**; **1**	HYD2; 2; 1	**HYD2**; **3**; 1	4th	118
2023‡	Godspeed Kochi	IRU1; 1	IRU1; 2; 4	IRU2; 1	**IRU2**; **2**; 1	IRU3; 1; 1	IRU3; 2							3rd	79
2024‡	Rarh Bengal Tigers	IRU1; 1; 5	IRU1; 2	IGR; 1	IGR; 2 DNS	IRU2; 1	IRU2; 2	KAR1; 1; 6	KAR1; 2	KAR2; 1; 8	KAR2; 2			5th	97

‡ Standings based on entry points, not individual drivers.

* Season in progress.

=== Complete Formula Regional Middle East Championship results ===
(key) (Races in bold indicate pole position) (Races in italics indicate fastest lap)

Year	Entrant	1	2	3	4	5	6	7	8	9	10	11	12	13	14	15	DC	Points
2023	R-ace GP	DUB1; 1; 10	DUB1; 2; 1	DUB1; 3; 10	KUW1; 1; 8	KUW1; 2; 2	KUW1; 3; 11	KUW2; 1; 19	KUW2; 2; 5	KUW2; 3; 11	DUB2; 1; 18	DUB2; 2; 13	DUB2; 3; 8	ABU; 1; 7	ABU; 2; 8	ABU; 3 Ret	9th	73
2024	MP Motorsport	YMC1; 1; 14	YMC1; 2; 16	YMC1; 3; 13	YMC2; 1; 12	YMC2; 2 Ret	YMC2; 3; 8	DUB1; 1; 9	DUB1; 2; 1	DUB1; 3; 7	YMC3; 1; 8	YMC3; 2; 6	YMC3; 3; 22	DUB2; 1 Ret	DUB2; 2; 12	DUB2; 3 Ret	12th	49

=== Complete Formula Regional European Championship results ===
(key) (Races in bold indicate pole position) (Races in italics indicate fastest lap)

Year	Team	1	2	3	4	5	6	7	8	9	10	11	12	13	14	15	16	17	18	19	20	DC	Points
2023	Trident	IMO; 1; 9	IMO; 2; 3	CAT; 1; 8	CAT; 2; 14	HUN; 1 Ret	HUN; 2; 12	SPA; 1; 15	SPA; 2; 32	MUG; 1; 17	MUG; 2; 16	LEC; 1; 14	LEC; 2 Ret	RBR; 1; 12	RBR; 2; 5	MNZ; 1; 4	MNZ; 2; 11	ZAN; 1; 18	ZAN; 2 Ret	HOC; 1; 8	HOC; 2; 7	12th	56
2024	MP Motorsport	HOC; 1; 12	HOC; 2; 22	SPA; 1; 10	SPA; 2; 17	ZAN; 1; 15	ZAN; 2; 19	HUN; 1; 17	HUN; 2; 14	MUG; 1; 21	MUG; 2; 26	LEC; 1; 15	LEC; 2; 11	IMO; 1; 18	IMO; 2 Ret	RBR; 1; 24	RBR; 2; 19	CAT; 1; 19	CAT; 2 Ret	MNZ; 1; 10	MNZ; 2; 13	22nd	2
