= Sai Sanjay =

Indian racing driver

- Nationality: Indian
- Born: Sai Sanjay Thirugnana Sambandam; 3 December 2002 (age 23) Salem, Tamil Nadu, India

GT World Challenge Europe Endurance Cup
- Categorisation: FIA Silver
- Years active: 2025
- Teams: CSA Racing
- Starts: 4
- Wins: 0
- Poles: 0
- Fastest laps: 0

Previous series
- 2022–23 2023–2025 2024: MRF Formula 2000; Indian Racing League; British GT Championship

Championship titles
- 2022–23: MRF Formula 2000

Sai Sanjay Thirugnana Sambandam (born 3 December 2002 in Salem) is a racing driver from India. He currently competes in GT World Challenge Europe with CSA Racing.

== Career ==
In 2022, Sanjay made his car racing debut in MRF Formula 2000, winning three races en route to the title. He remained in domestic competition for 2023, contesting the Indian Racing League alongside former GP2 Series race winner Jon Lancaster – in a season heavily disrupted by Cyclone Michaung, the pairing finished runner-up in the championship having scored four podiums, one of which contributed by Sanjay at the second round.

Sanjay moved to the United Kingdom in 2024 to contest the GT4 class of the British GT Championship; he and co-driver Callum Davies managed a single class podium at Brands Hatch in their McLaren Artura. He stepped up to GT3 racing for 2025 in GT World Challenge Europe with CSA Racing, contesting the full season in a McLaren 720S GT3 Evo. He won his first Indian Racing League race in 2025 at Kari Motor Speedway.

Sanjay studies mechatronics at the Vellore Institute of Technology in Chennai.

== Racing record ==
=== Career summary ===
Season	Series	Team	Races	Wins	Poles	F/Laps	Podiums	Points	Position
2022–23	MRF Formula 2000	MRF Racing	12	3	1	2	8	201	**1st**
2023	Indian Racing League	Chennai Turbo Riders	3	0	0	0	1	83‡	**2nd‡**
2024	British GT Championship - GT4	RaceLab	8	0	0	0	1	27.5	14th
2024	Indian Racing League	Speed Demons Delhi	4	0	0	0	0	36‡	11th‡
2025	GT World Challenge Europe Endurance Cup	CSA Racing	5	0	0	0	0	0	NC
2025	Indian Racing League	Speed Demons Delhi							
2026	Italian GT Championship Endurance Cup - GT3	CSA Racing	3	0	1	0	0	17	13th
2026	GT World Challenge Europe Endurance Cup	CSA Racing	1	0	0	0	0	0	NC

*Season in progress.

‡ Team standings

=== Complete GT World Challenge Europe results ===
==== GT World Challenge Europe Endurance Cup ====
(key) (Races in bold indicate pole position) (Races in italics indicate fastest lap)

Year	Team	Car	Class	1	2	3	4	5	6	7	Pos.	Points
2025	CSA Racing	McLaren 720S GT3 Evo	Silver	LEC; Ret	MNZ; 39	SPA; 6H; 74†	SPA; 12H; 74†	SPA; 24H; Ret	NÜR; 42	CAT; Ret	NC	0
2026	CSA Racing	McLaren 720S GT3 Evo	Silver	LEC	MNZ	SPA; 6H; 45	SPA; 12H; 33	SPA; 24H; 40	NÜR	ALG	34th	3

=== Complete 24 Hours of Spa results ===
Year	Team	Co-Drivers	Car	Class	Laps	Pos.	Class Pos.
2025	(France) CSA Racing	(France) Edgar Maloigne (United Kingdom) Josh Mason (France) Maxime Robin	McLaren 720S GT3 Evo	Silver; Cup	23	DNF	DNF
2026	(France) CSA Racing	(France) Romain Andriolo (Belgium) Lorens Lecertua (Belgium) Baptiste Moulin	McLaren 720S GT3 Evo	Silver; Cup	488	40th	12th
