= Kichcha's Kings Bengaluru =

Indian racing team

Kichcha's Kings Bengaluru is an Indian motorsport franchise that competes in the Indian Racing League and the F4 Indian Championship. IRL and F4 championship are organised by Racing Promotions Private Limited.

The Bengaluru franchise was acquired by Kannada actor Kichcha Sudeep and his wife Priya Sudeep. It was launched by RPPL chairm Akhilesh Reddy in July 2025. Neel Jaani from Switzerland is the lead driver. He is a former Le Mans winner and former Formula One test driver. Multiple Indian National karting champion, Bengaluru's Ruhaan Alva, British endurance and GT racing driver Jem Hepworth and another Karting champion from Bengaluru Kyle Kumaran complete the line-up.

KKB is one of the six city-based teams along with Speed Demons Delhi, Hyderabad Blackbirds, Goa Aces JA Racing, Kolkata Royal Tigers, and Chennai Turbo Riders.

“Racing, like cinema, is pure adrenaline. It’s about timing, control, instinct, and above all, heart. Kichcha’s Kings Bengaluru is my tribute to the spirit of this city, its talent, its grit, and its youth,” said Sudeepa.
