= Hyderabad Street Circuit =

Motorsport track in India

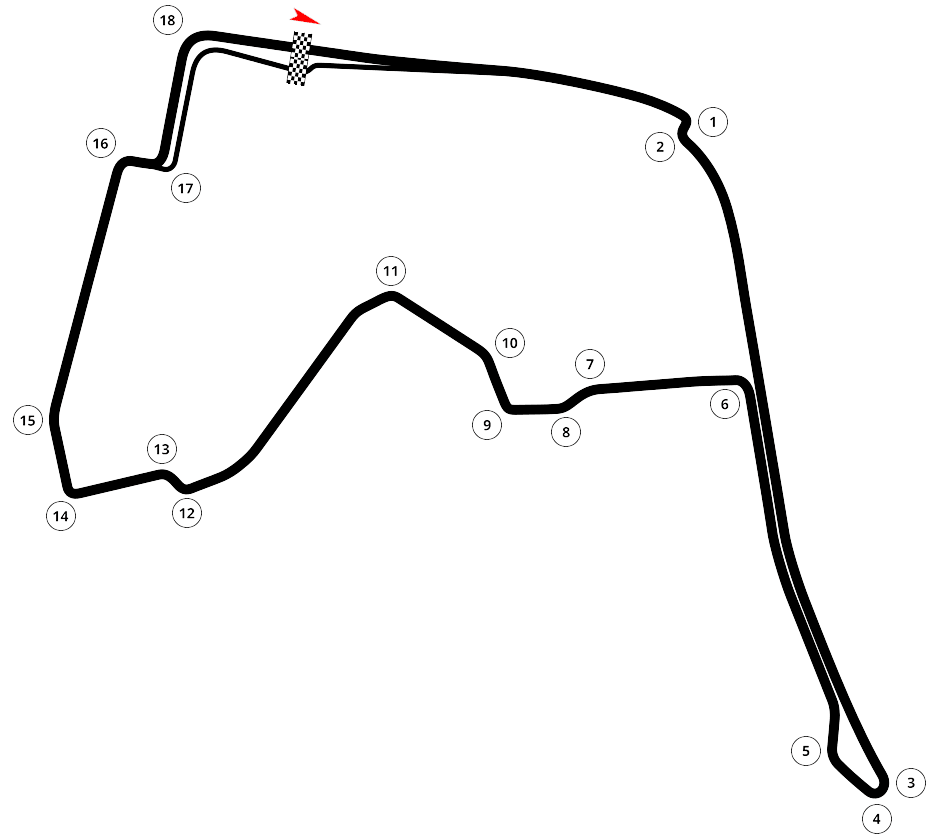
- Formula E Circuit (2023)
- Location: Hyderabad, Telangana
- Coordinates: 17°24′35″N 78°28′18″E
- Capacity: 35,000
- Owner: Hyderabad Motor Racing Pvt Ltd
- Opened: 19 November 2022; 3 years ago
- Closed: 11 February 2023; 3 years ago
- Construction cost: ₹140 crore (US$15 million)
- Architect: Driven International
- Major events: Former: Formula E Hyderabad ePrix (2023); Indian Racing League (2022)

Formula E Circuit (2023)
- Length: 2.835 km (1.762 mi)
- Turns: 18
- Race lap record: 1:14.698 ( (France) Norman Nato, Nissan e-4ORCE 04, 2023, F-E)

Original Circuit (2022)
- Length: 2.830 km (1.758 mi)
- Turns: 17
- Race lap record: 1:16.364 ( (United Kingdom) Jon Lancaster, Wolf GB08 Thunder, 2022, CN)

Hyderabad Street Circuit was a 2.835 km (1.762 mi) street circuit laid out on the streets of Hyderabad, Telangana, India. The track was set up in and around the Secretariat Complex and went through Lumbini Park, situated on the banks of Hussain Sagar Lake. The Hyderabad ePrix was staged on the circuit in 2023. It was held as part of the 2022–23 Formula E World Championship season and was the first Formula E race held in the country.

== History ==
Hyderabad was one of a number of Indian cities bidding to host a round of the FIA Formula E World Championship, although it was only seriously considered after the COVID-19 pandemic had halted the discussions between the FIA and proposed hosts in Delhi and Mumbai. On 17 January 2022, the Government of Telangana signed a "letter of intent" with Formula E to stage the Hyderabad ePrix, with a planned debut as a round of the 2022/23 season, towards the start of the season. The Hyderabad ePrix was subsequently listed on the first provisional calendar for 2022–23 as the fourth round of the season, with an initial date of 11 February 2023.

Besides Formula E, it was also planned for Hyderabad Street Circuit to host races for the Formula Regional Indian Championship and the F4 Indian Championship, however both championships were cancelled in 2022. After the cancellation of those championships, the circuit was scheduled to host two rounds of the new Indian Racing League in 2022 as a test before Formula E's debut. The first of these events was cancelled following the opening practice session after a driver broke their leg in a crash, but this was not communicated to patrons or the outside world until after the event was scheduled to conclude. The Indian Racing League returned for its season finale three weeks later, with Alister Yoong and Nikhil Bohra winning all three races for the Godspeed Kochi franchise.

Ahead of the 2023 Hyderabad ePrix, a chicane was added at the Hussein Sagar corner to reduce speeds as the run-off area could not be extended. Jean-Éric Vergne emerged victorious for DS Penske, holding off a fast-finishing Nick Cassidy as both Jaguar Racing drivers collided at the hairpin. The Indian Racing League was scheduled to return to the circuit as the 2023 season-opener, but was moved to the Madras International Circuit due to local elections.

== Circuit ==
Necklace Road, Hyderabad

Hyderabad Motor Racing Pvt Ltd constructed the first ever street race circuit certified by the FIA in India. The racetrack's starting position was across from the NTR Garden, from where it would pass via NTR Marg and IMAX road before returning to the starting point in a loop. The track is 11 m (36 ft) wide on average. For the competing teams, a total of 12 FIA pit garages are being constructed close to the IMAX turning.

== Lap records ==
The fastest official race lap records at the Hyderabad Street Circuit are listed as:

| Category | Time | Driver | Vehicle | Date |
Formula E Circuit (2023): 2.835 km (1.762 mi)
| Formula E | 1:14.698 | (France) Norman Nato | Nissan e-4ORCE 04 | 11 February 2023 |
Original Circuit (2022): 2.830 km (1.758 mi)
| Group CN | 1:16.364 | (United Kingdom) Jon Lancaster | Wolf GB08 Thunder | 11 December 2022 |

== See also ==
- Buddh International Circuit
- Madras International Circuit
