= Goa Street Circuit =

Street racing circuit in India

- Location: Mopa, Goa
- Coordinates: 15°44′09″N 73°51′42″E
- Opened: 14 February 2026; 4 months ago
- Major events: Current: Indian Racing League (2026)

Street Circuit (2026)
- Length: 2.064 km (1.283 mi)
- Turns: 12

Goa Street Circuit is a street formula racing circuit in Goa. It hosted the Indian Racing League race in February 2026. After the approvals by the Tourism department of Goa, the Racing Promotions Private Limited (RPPL) chairman Akhilesh Reddy announced the street circuit in February 2025.

The Round 4 of the 2025-26 Indian Racing League was held at the custom built temporary racing track at the Manohar International Airport (GOX), on 14 and 15 February 2026. The 2.064 km (1.283 mi) FIA-grade street circuit, was set up within the airport complex for the IRL race and it has 12 turns, and has late braking zones and offered overtaking opportunities. It had limited run-off areas.

The IRL Goa race was the first race at the Goa street circuit which will be dismantled after the Sunday race, just like the F1 street circuit in Singapore. This is the third street circuit in India after the Hyderabad Street Circuit and Chennai Formula Racing Circuit.

The total investment was estimated at Rs 127 crore, with the Goa government contributing Rs.25 crore for the circuit.
