= Chennai Formula Racing Circuit =

Motorsport track in India

- Location: Chennai, Tamil Nadu, India
- Coordinates: 13°4′22.08″N 80°16′50.52″E
- FIA Grade: 3
- Opened: 31 August 2024; 2 years ago
- Closed: 1 September 2024; 2 years ago
- Architect: Driven International
- Major events: Indian Racing League (2024); F4 India (2024)

Street Circuit (2024)
- Length: 3.839 km (2.385 mi)
- Turns: 19
- Race lap record: 1:39.161 ( (Portugal) Álvaro Parente, Wolf GB08, 2024, CN)

Chennai Formula Racing Circuit, also known as the Chennai City Circuit, is a 3.839 km (2.385mi) street circuit in Island Grounds, Chennai, Tamil Nadu, India. It hosted the second round of the F4 Indian Championship and the Indian Racing League 2024 on 31 August 2024.

== History ==
Racing Promotions Private Limited, the organisers of the Indian Racing League and F4 Indian Championship, conceived a street circuit in Chennai in collaboration with the Sports Development Authority of Tamil Nadu, and it was formally launched to the public on 16 August 2023. Funding for the circuit was provided by the Government of Tamil Nadu, with the Greater Chennai Corporation and the Chennai Metropolitan Development Authority undertaking construction. The circuit become the second street circuit in India after the Hyderabad Street Circuit and it was scheduled to host India’s first night street race for the Indian Racing League and Indian F4 on 9 and 10 December 2023; however, the event was canceled due to Cyclone Michaung and delayed to August 2024.

The circuit's debut was rescheduled for 31 August – 1 September 2024, using the same categories and retaining the night race concept. However, the circuit did not receive its FIA homologation in time and an approval was given after the Madras High Court sought an extension of the homologation deadline, leading to just the IRL cars undertaking a brief shakedown late on the Saturday night. The first race held on the circuit was for the domestic entry-level Formula LGB 4 series, and was won by T.S. Diljith. Hugh Barter and Aqil Alibhai were the first Formula 4 winners on the circuit, whilst Raoul Hyman and Álvaro Parente won the first Indian Racing League heats – the first IRL race was red-flagged after a dog made its way onto the circuit.

== Track ==
The circuit – designed by Driven International, the group which built the Hyderabad Formula E circuit – is situated around the Island Grounds, features 19 corners and runs in an anti-clockwise direction. The circuit starts on Kamarajar Promenade, some 450 metres from the Bay of Bengal. A 'bus stop' complex of corners follows around the Victory War Memorial, before running north-west along Flag Staff Road. A left-hander then follows onto a long straight traversing Anna Salai, broken up by a chicane around the Statue of Thomas Munro. A hairpin then follows at the Periyar Statue before heading south-east along Swami Sivananda Salai, with this section broken up by a series of chicanes before the final corner around the Memorial Pillar of the 75th Independence Day – the lap finishes by crossing the Napier Bridge. The pit-lane and paddock facilities lie adjacent to the Victory War Memorial.

Following issues with homologation, turn 10 at the Periyar Statue and turn 19 at the 75th Anniversary Pillar had to be re-profiled – the track was ultimately granted a Grade Three licence.

== Lap records ==
The fastest official race lap records at the Chennai Formula Racing Circuit are listed as:

Category	Time	Driver	Vehicle	Date
Full Circuit (2024): 3.839 km (2.385 mi)
Group CN	1:39.161	(Portugal) Álvaro Parente	Wolf-Aprilia GB08 "Thunder"	1 September 2024
Formula 4	1:41.952	(Australia) Hugh Barter	Mygale M21-F4	1 September 2024
Formula LGB 4	2:02.704	(India) T.S. Diljith	Super Speeds-Maruti	1 September 2024
