= Speed Demons Delhi =

Indian auto racing team

Speed Demons Delhi is an Indian motorsport franchise that competes in the Indian Racing League and the F4 Indian Championship. IRL and F4 championship are organised by Racing Promotions Private Limited.

The Delhi franchise is owned by actor Arjun Kapoor. The team for Round 4 races at the Goa Street Circuit is led by Malaysian racer Alister Yoong. Shahan Ali Mohsin was the Indian driver while Sai Sanjay is replaced by 2025 MRF Formula 2000 champion Ishaan Madesh. Australian GT racer Caitlin Wood was the female driver.

Speed Demons Delhi is one of the six city-based teams along with Kichcha's Kings Bengaluru, Hyderabad Blackbirds, Goa Aces JA Racing, Kolkata Royal Tigers, and Chennai Turbo Riders.

In August 2025, in the Round 1 held at Kari Motor Speedway in Coimbatore, Sai Sanjay logged a victory for Speed Demons in the second race for Driver B.
