= Goa Aces JA Racing =

Indian racing team

Goa Aces JA Racing is an Indian motorsport franchise that competes in the Indian Racing League and the F4 Indian Championship. IRL and F4 championship are organised by Racing Promotions Private Limited.

The team is owned by actor John Abraham. Two-time IRL champion Raoul Hyman is the team's foreign driver while the Indian drivers are Chetan Surineni and Akash Gowda. Fabienne Wohlwend, who competed in the W Series and the Ferrari Challenge is the lady driver. They took part in Round 4 at the Goa Street Circuit in February 2026. In the Goa round, they won two of the three races and took the lead in the championship.

IRL has six city-based teams. They are Kichcha's Kings Bengaluru, Speed Demons Delhi, Hyderabad Blackbirds, Goa Aces JA Racing, Kolkata Royal Tigers, and Chennai Turbo Riders.

In August 2025, in the Round 1 held at Kari Motor Speedway in Coimbatore, Wohlwend gave a tough fight to winner Sai Sanjay of Speed Demons and secured a podium.
