= Hyderabad Blackbirds =

Indian racing team

Hyderabad Blackbirds is an Indian motorsport franchise that competes in the Indian Racing League and the F4 Indian Championship. IRL and F4 championship are organised by Racing Promotions Private Limited.

The franchise is owned by actor Naga Chaitanya. British racing driver Jon Lancaster, a former GP2 winner and Le Mans podium finisher, will be the main foreign driver. Akshay Bohra and Mohamed Ryan, are the Indian drivers and Gabriela Jilkova from Czech Republic, a GT racing expert, will be the lady driver.

IRL has six city-based teams. They are Kichcha's Kings Bengaluru, Speed Demons Delhi, Hyderabad Blackbirds, Goa Aces JA Racing, Kolkata Royal Tigers, and Chennai Turbo Riders.
