= Shahan Ali Mohsin =

Indian racing driver

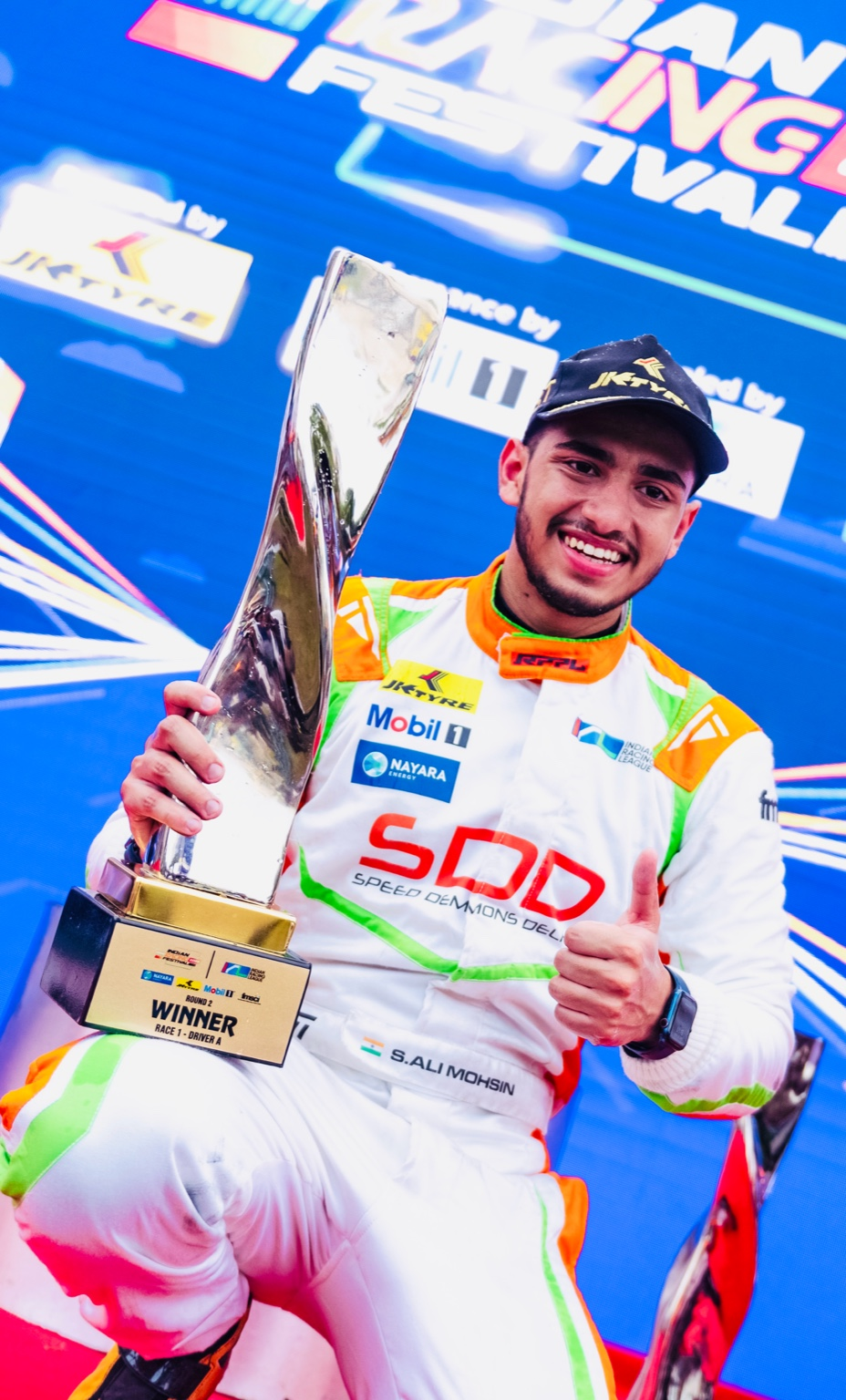
- Shahan Ali Mohsin with the winner’s trophy at the Indian Racing League 2025.
- Born: July 13, 2004 (age 22); Agra, Uttar Pradesh, India
- Teams: Current team-; Speed Demons Delhi (Current series- Indian Racing League); Former teams-; M Sports (India); JA Motorsports (India); Goa Aces JA Racing (India); Serafini Racing (Italy); Stratos Motorsport (Malaysia); Uniq Racing (Poland); KR Sport (UK); Dan Holland Racing (UK)

Championship titles
- Indian National Car Racing Champion (MRF F1600, 2021)
- Debut (single-seaters): 2019, MRF Formula 1600 (age 14); Key results: FIA F4 India (2023) – 3 wins, 7 podiums; IRL race wins (2022, 2025); Karting titles: 7(6× Indian National, Asian Champion 2016); Awards: Driver of the Year – 2015, 2016, 2018, 2019; Arjuna Award nomination (2020, by FMSCI)

Shahan Ali Mohsin (born 13 July 2004, Agra, Uttar Pradesh, India) is an Indian racing driver. He has won seven Indian National titles, and the 2016 Asian Karting Championship - eight notable championships in total. He was awarded the Federation of Motor Sports Clubs of India (FMSCI) "Driver of the Year" in 2015, 2016, 2018, and 2019. He was nominated for the Arjuna Award in 2020, one of India’s highest sporting honours.

== Racing career ==
=== Single-Seater Career (Reverse Chronological) ===
- 2025 – Indian Racing League (IRL): Returned to Speed Demons Delhi, securing a dominant lights-to-flag win in Round 2 at the Madras International Circuit. He continued his strong form in Round 3 at Coimbatore, finishing second and keeping Speed Demons Delhi in the championship fight.
- 2024 – Indian Racing League (IRL): Raced for Goa Aces JA Racing, contributing to the team’s success as they became IRL champions of 2024.
- 2023 – FIA Formula 4 India: Competed in the inaugural FIA F4 Indian Championship. Scored seven podium finishes, including three race wins, becoming the first Indian driver to win a race in the series.
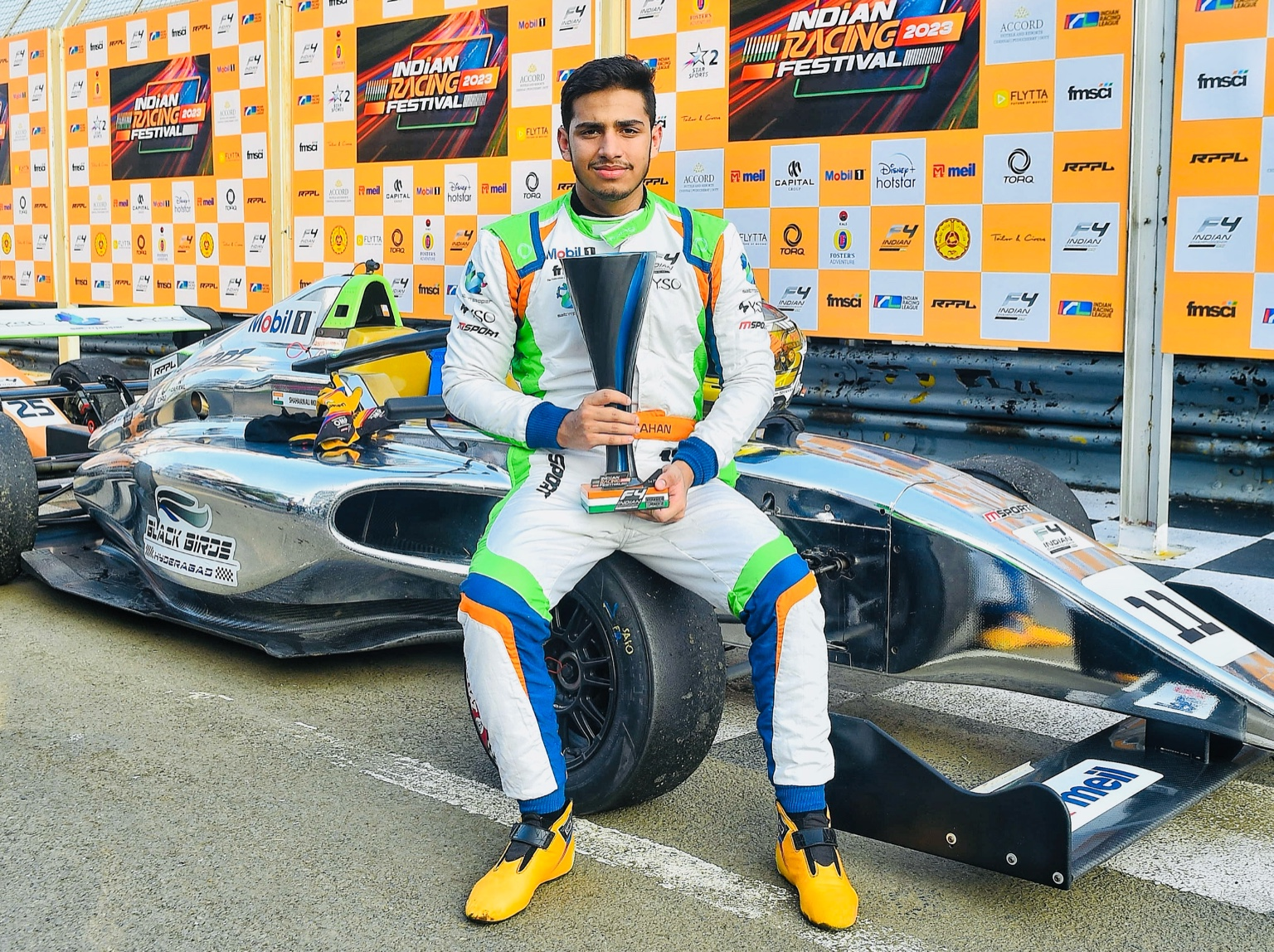
  Shahan Ali Mohsin celebrating an F4 India victory.
- 2022 – Indian Racing League (IRL): In the inaugural season, raced for Speed Demons Delhi, giving the team their maiden victory by winning the sprint race and finishing 2nd in the feature race.
- 2021 – MRF F1600: Crowned Indian National Car Racing Champion (MRF F1600) after a consistent season with multiple race wins.
- 2019 – MRF F1600: At the age of 14, became the youngest ever driver to race in the MRF Formula 1600 single-seater series.

=== Karting Career – Indian National Titles (Reverse Chronological) ===
- 2019 – Indian National Rotax Max Karting Champion (Senior)
- 2018 – Indian National Rotax Max Karting Champion (Junior)
- 2018 – MecoMotorsport X30 India Challenge Champion (Junior)
- 2018 – Dual categories milestone: Competed in both Junior & Senior in the same season; crowned Indian National Junior Champion and Indian National Second Runner-up in Senior
- 2017 – Indian Rookie Cup Champion, Meco Motorsport Rotax Kart Open (Junior)
- 2016 – Indian National Rotax Max Karting Champion (Micro Max)
- 2015 – Indian National Rotax Max Karting Champion (Micro Max)

=== Karting Career – International Titles & Highlights (Reverse Chronological) ===
- 2019 – Rotax Grand Finals (Italy): First Indian to qualify in the top-ten in Senior category.
- 2018 – IAME X30 World Final (Le Mans, France): Represented India.
- 2017 – Rotax Max Central European Championship (Austria, Speedworld round): Finished second overall in the Junior Max category, marking his first European podium.
- 2016 – Asian Karting Championship (Micro Max): First Indian to win an Asian Karting title.

== Personal life ==
Mohsin completed his schooling at Delhi Public School, Agra. He later moved to Dubai for higher studies. His father, Shahroo Mohsin, is a shoe manufacturer and exporter.

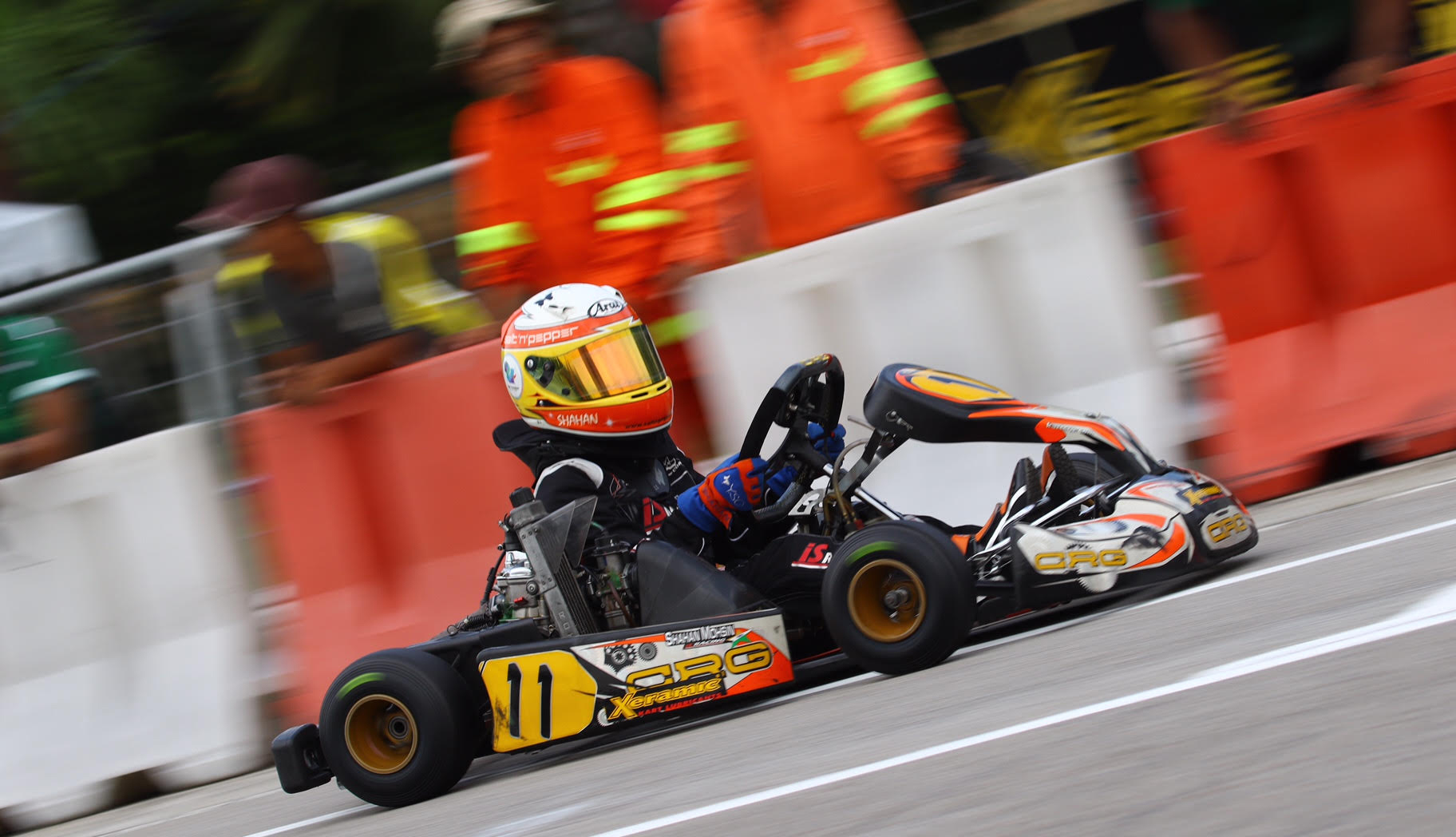
Shahan in action at the Rotax Asia Max Challenge

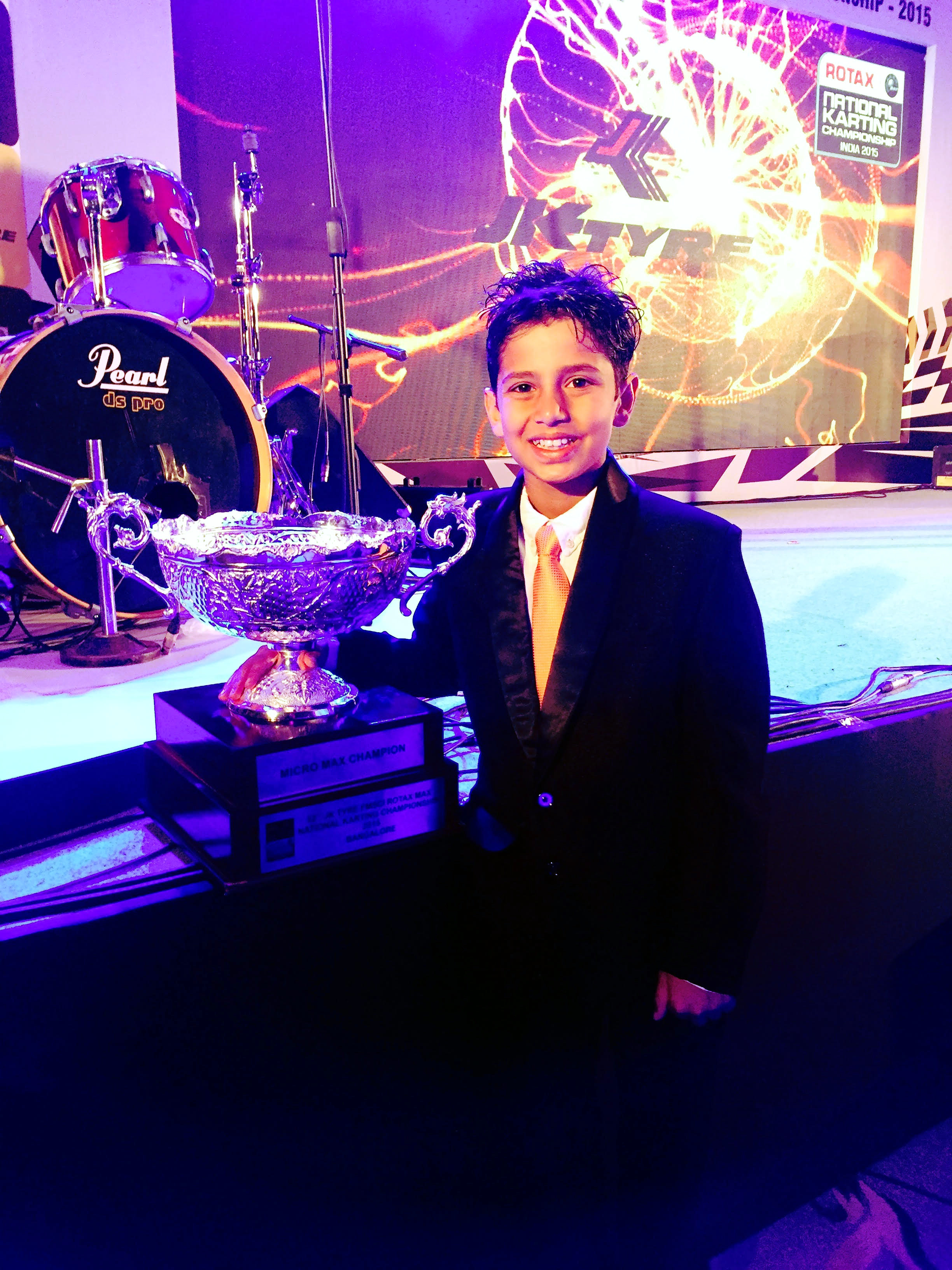
Shahan with his championship trophy after winning the JK Tyre Rotax Max Micro Max title.

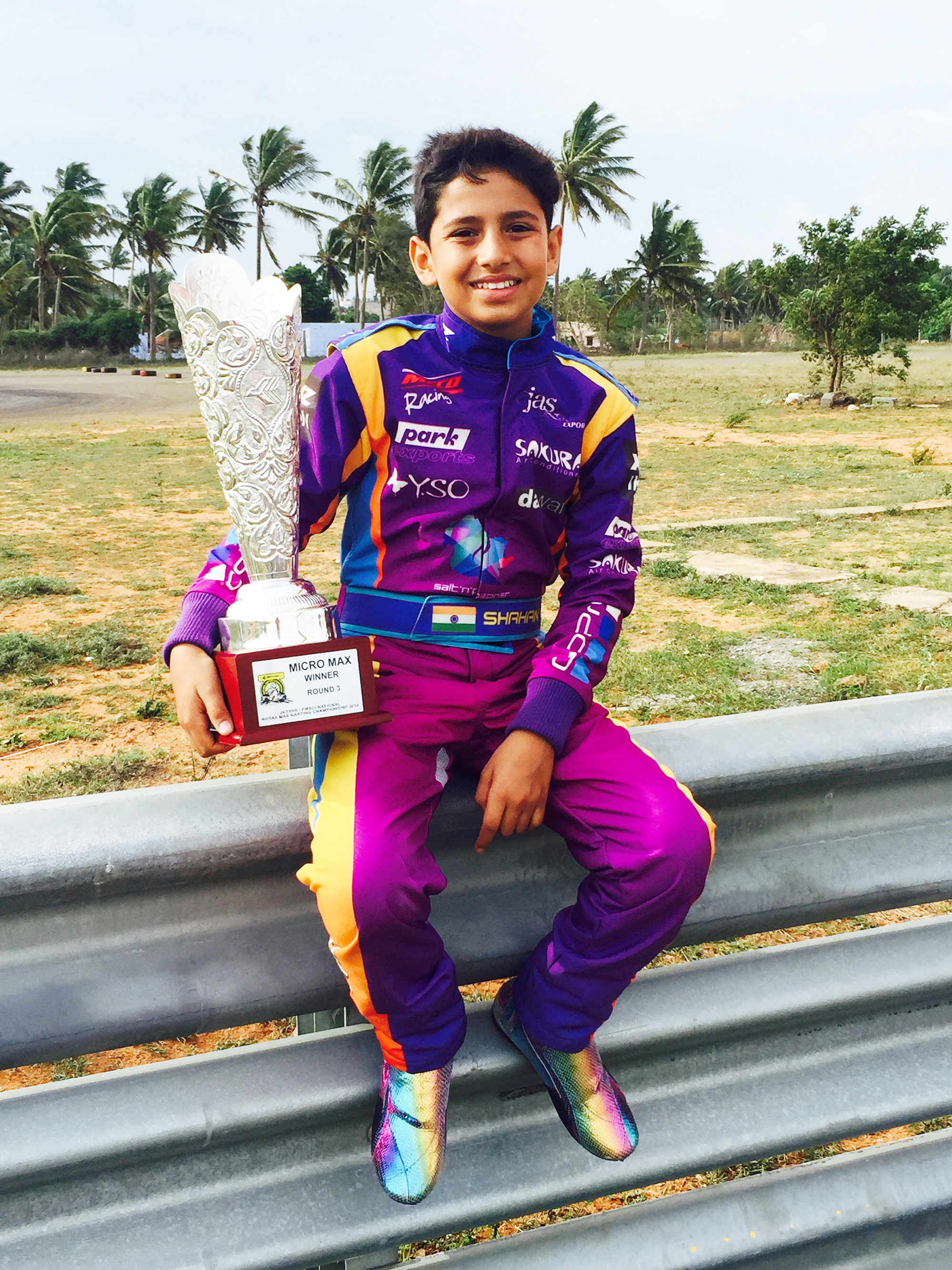
Shahan with his JK Tyre National Karting Championship Trophy.

== Racing record ==
=== Career highlights ===
Year	Series / Championship	Team	Achievement
2025	Indian Racing League	Speed Demons Delhi	Race winner (Madras International Circuit); podium at Coimbatore
2024	Indian Racing League	Goa Aces JA Racing	Member of championship-winning team
2023	FIA Formula 4 India Championship	Hyderabad Blackbirds	7 podiums, including 3 wins
2019	MRF F1600 Championship	MRF Racing	Indian National Car Racing Champion
2018	MecoMotorsport X30 India Challenge (Junior)	—	National Karting Champion
2016	Asian Karting Championship	—	Champion (Micro Max)
2015–2019	Indian National Karting Championship	—	7-time Champion across Micro Max, Junior & Senior categories

Includes selected highlights from national and international competition.

== Awards and recognition ==
- Driver of the Year (FMSCI): 2015, 2016, 2018, 2019
- Rising Star of the Year, Agra (2016)
- Arjuna Award nomination (2020, by FMSCI)

== Career Tally ==
- Indian National titles (Karting + Single-seater): 7(6× Indian National karting, single seater MRF F1600 - 2021)
- Asian title: 1 (2016 Asian Karting Championship, Micro Max)
- Total notable championships: 8
