= Wolf GB08 =

Sports prototype race car

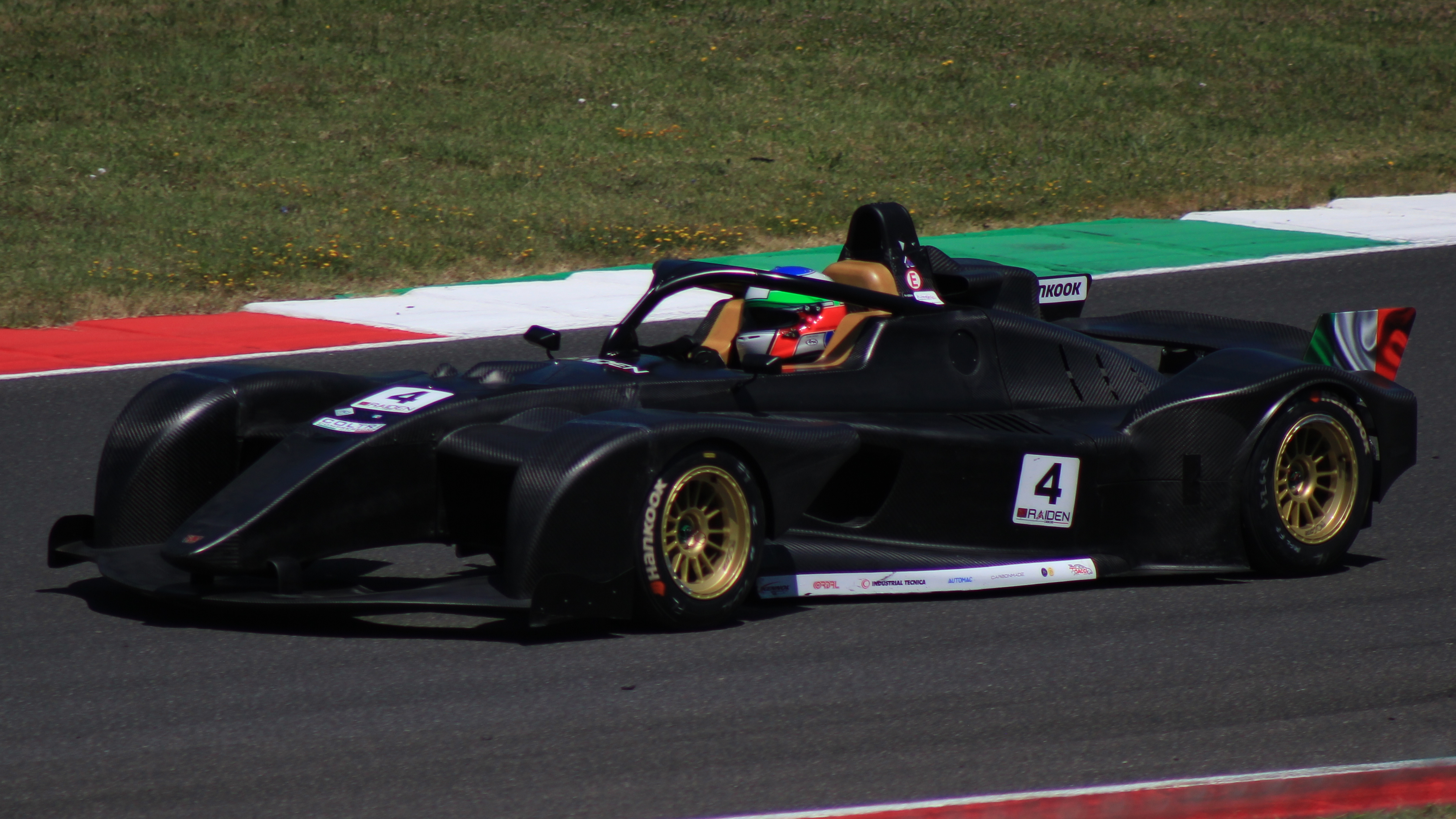
- Category: CN
- Production: 2010–present

Technical specifications
- Chassis: Carbon fiber monocoque, fiberglass body
- Suspension: Double wishbones, pushrod actuated coil springs over shock absorbers, adjustable anti-roll bar
- Length: 4,121–4,787 mm (162.2–188.5 in)
- Width: 1,783–1,920 mm (70.2–75.6 in)
- Wheelbase: 2,527–2,677 mm (99.5–105.4 in)
- Engine: Aprilia RSV4 1.0–1.1 L (61.0–67.1 cu in) 65° DOHC V4 naturally-aspirated mid-engined PSA 1.6 L (97.6 cu in) DOHC I4 turbocharged mid-engined Honda K20 2.0–2.4 L (122.0–146.5 cu in) DOHC I4 turbocharged mid-engined Ford 5.2 L (317.3 cu in) 90° DOHC V8 naturally-aspirated mid-engined Powertec 3.0 L (183.1 cu in) 72° DOHC V8 naturally-aspirated mid-engined Hayabusa 1.7 L (103.7 cu in) DOHC V8 supercharged mid-engined
- Transmission: Sadev SLR82 or Wolf RC184 6-speed paddle-shift sequential
- Power: 201–650 hp (150–485 kW)
- Weight: 378–650 kg (833–1,433 lb)

Competition history

The Wolf GB08 is a series of sports prototype race cars, designed, developed, and built by Italian manufacturer Wolf Racing Cars, for various forms of motorsports, like hillclimbing and sports car racing, produced by the company since 2010.

The GB08 became notable for its record at the Pikes Peak Hill Climb, having won the Super Unlimited class four times, twice with driver Robin Shute. Shute later took his GB08 TCS-FS car to a GRIDLIFE event at Laguna Seca, setting a lap time of 1:10.920, beating every official lap record set at that track, save for Alex Palou's 1:08.4168 IndyCar record and Alex Zanardi's 1:10.148 CART record.
