= 2023 F4 Indian Championship =

Motor racing championship

The 2023 F4 Indian Championship was the inaugural season of the F4 Indian Championship. It was a motor racing championship for open wheel, formula racing cars regulated according to FIA Formula 4 regulations. Initially, the series was planned to launch in 2022, before being postponed multiple times and then finally rescheduled to 2023. The season commenced on 4 November at the Madras International Circuit and concluded on 17 December at the same circuit.

== Drivers ==
All cars were run by MP Motorsport.

Team	No.	Driver	Rounds
Chennai Turbo Riders	5	(India) Dion Gowda	2
Chennai Turbo Riders	17	(Singapore) Rishab Jain	All
Chennai Turbo Riders	37	(Australia) Cooper Webster	All
Hyderabad Blackbirds	11	(India) Shahan Ali Mohsin	All
Hyderabad Blackbirds	12	(Vietnam) Alex Sawer	All
Goa Aces	23	(India) Arjun Chheda	1–2, 4
Goa Aces	50	(Australia) Jack Taylor	All
Speed Demons Delhi	25	(India) Rishon Rajeev	All
Speed Demons Delhi	92	(India) Shriya Lohia	3
Speed Demons Delhi	97	(India) Veer Rajwade	4
Bangalore Speedsters	27	(India) Rohaan Madesh	All
Bangalore Speedsters	28	(Singapore) Nooris Gafoor	1–2
Godspeed Kochi	28	(Singapore) Nooris Gafoor	3–4
Godspeed Kochi	31	(India) Akshay Bohra	All
Godspeed Kochi	97	(India) Salva Marjan	1
Godspeed Kochi	97	(India) Veer Rajwade	2

- Ahren Manhas was announced to compete but withdrew before the start of the championship.

== Calendar ==
All rounds took place in India. Initially, the schedule consisted of 15 races over 5 rounds. The revised version without any round at Buddh International Circuit was published on 26 October. In order to comply with the election code of conduct, the first round was moved from Hyderabad Street Circuit to Madras International Circuit. Further revision was published on 22 November. In the aftermath of Cyclone Michaung, the round 3 scheduled on 5–6 December at Madras International Circuit was cancelled and the round planned to be held on 9–10 December at the street track Chennai Formula Racing Circuit was postponed and eventually cancelled. Instead, Madras International Circuit once again hosted a round on the same date.

Round		Circuit	Date	Pole position	Fastest lap	Winning driver	Winning team
1	R1	Madras International Circuit, Chennai (Full Circuit)	4 November	(India) Akshay Bohra	(India) Akshay Bohra	(India) Akshay Bohra	Godspeed Kochi
1	R2	Madras International Circuit, Chennai (Full Circuit)	5 November		(India) Rishon Rajeev	(Australia) Cooper Webster	Chennai Turbo Riders
1	R3	Madras International Circuit, Chennai (Full Circuit)	5 November	(India) Akshay Bohra	(India) Akshay Bohra	(Australia) Cooper Webster (Note: Akshay Bohra finished first but received a 25 seconds time penalty. Webster inherited the win.)	Chennai Turbo Riders
2	R1	Madras International Circuit, Chennai (Full Circuit)	1 December	(Australia) Cooper Webster	(India) Dion Gowda	(Australia) Cooper Webster	Chennai Turbo Riders
2	R2	Madras International Circuit, Chennai (Full Circuit)	1 December		(India) Rishon Rajeev	(India) Shahan Ali Mohsin	Hyderabad Blackbirds
2	R3	Madras International Circuit, Chennai (Full Circuit)	2 December	(India) Akshay Bohra	(India) Rishon Rajeev	(India) Dion Gowda	Chennai Turbo Riders
–		Madras International Circuit, Chennai	5–6 December	round cancelled due to Cyclone Michaung			
3	R1	Madras International Circuit, Chennai (Short Circuit)	9 December	(Australia) Cooper Webster	(Australia) Cooper Webster	(Australia) Cooper Webster	Chennai Turbo Riders
3	R2	Madras International Circuit, Chennai (Short Circuit)	9 December		(Australia) Cooper Webster	(India) Shahan Ali Mohsin	Hyderabad Blackbirds
3	R3	Madras International Circuit, Chennai (Short Circuit)	10 December	(Australia) Cooper Webster	(Australia) Cooper Webster	(Australia) Cooper Webster	Chennai Turbo Riders
3	R4	Madras International Circuit, Chennai (Short Circuit)	10 December		(India) Akshay Bohra	(Vietnam) Alex Sawer	Hyderabad Blackbirds
3	R5	Madras International Circuit, Chennai (Short Circuit)	10 December		(Australia) Cooper Webster	(Australia) Cooper Webster	Chennai Turbo Riders
4	R1	Madras International Circuit, Chennai (Full Circuit)	16 December	(Australia) Cooper Webster	(Australia) Cooper Webster	(Australia) Cooper Webster	Chennai Turbo Riders
4	R2	Madras International Circuit, Chennai (Full Circuit)	17 December		(India) Rishon Rajeev	(India) Rishon Rajeev	Speed Demons Delhi
4	R3	Madras International Circuit, Chennai (Full Circuit)	17 December	(Australia) Cooper Webster	(Australia) Cooper Webster	(Australia) Cooper Webster	Chennai Turbo Riders
4	R4	Madras International Circuit, Chennai (Full Circuit)	17 December		(Australia) Cooper Webster	(India) Shahan Ali Mohsin	Hyderabad Blackbirds

== Championship standings ==
Points were awarded as follows:

Position	1st	2nd	3rd	4th	5th	6th	7th	8th	9th	10th
Points	25	18	15	12	10	8	6	4	2	1

=== Drivers' Championship ===
Pos	Driver	MIC1			MIC2			MIC3					MIC4				Pts
Pos	Driver	R1	R2	R3	R1	R2	R3 (Note: Half points awarded as race was stopped and not resumed before reaching the required distance for full points due to adverse weather conditions.)	R1	R2	R3	R4	R5	R1	R2	R3	R4	Pts
1	(Australia) Cooper Webster	6	1	1	**1**	2	3	**1**	4	**1**	4	1	**1**	3	**1**	5	282.5
2	(India) Rishon Rajeev	2	4	4	2	5	4	2	2	3	6	2	4	1	3	3	220
3	(India) Akshay Bohra	**1**	2	**7**	3	4	**2**	3	3	2	3	3	2	Ret	2	4	211
4	(India) Shahan Ali Mohsin	3	3	3	6	1	6	6	1	5	2	5	6	6	6	1	202
5	(Vietnam) Alex Sawer	4	10	2	5	3	DNS	4	5	6	1	4	3	2	4	2	186
6	(India) Rohaan Madesh	Ret	6	5	8	7	5	5	6	Ret	9	6	7	4	5	10	90
7	(Singapore) Rishab Jain	5	5	8	WD	WD	WD	7	9†	7	7	9	5	8	7	6	74
8	(Australia) Jack Taylor	8	8	9	Ret	6	9	9	8	4	5	8	8	Ret	9	7	63
9	(Singapore) Nooris Gafoor	7	9	10	7	8	7	8	7	8	8	7	9	7	10	9	57
10	(India) Arjun Chheda	Ret	7	6	9	DNS	8						10	5	8	8	37
11	(India) Dion Gowda				4	Ret	1										24.5
12	(India) Veer Rajwade				WD	WD	WD						Ret	9	11	11	2
13	(India) Shriya Lohia							10	10	WD	WD	WD					2
–	(India) Salva Marjan	DNQ	DNQ	DNQ													–
Pos	Driver	R1	R2	R3	R1	R2	R3	R1	R2	R3	R4	R5	R1	R2	R3	R4	Pts
Pos	Driver	MIC1			MIC2			MIC3					MIC4				Pts

Colour	Result
Gold	Winner
Silver	Second place
Bronze	Third place
Green	Points classification
Blue	Non-points classification
Blue	Non-classified finish (NC)
Purple	Retired, not classified (Ret)
Red	Did not qualify (DNQ)
Red	Did not pre-qualify (DNPQ)
Black	Disqualified (DSQ)
White	Did not start (DNS)
White	Withdrew (WD)
White	Race cancelled (C)
Blank	Did not practice (DNP)
Blank	Did not arrive (DNA)
Blank	Excluded (EX)

**Bold** – Pole
Italics – Fastest Lap
† — Did not finish, but classified
