= Cooper Webster =

Australian racing driver (born 2003)

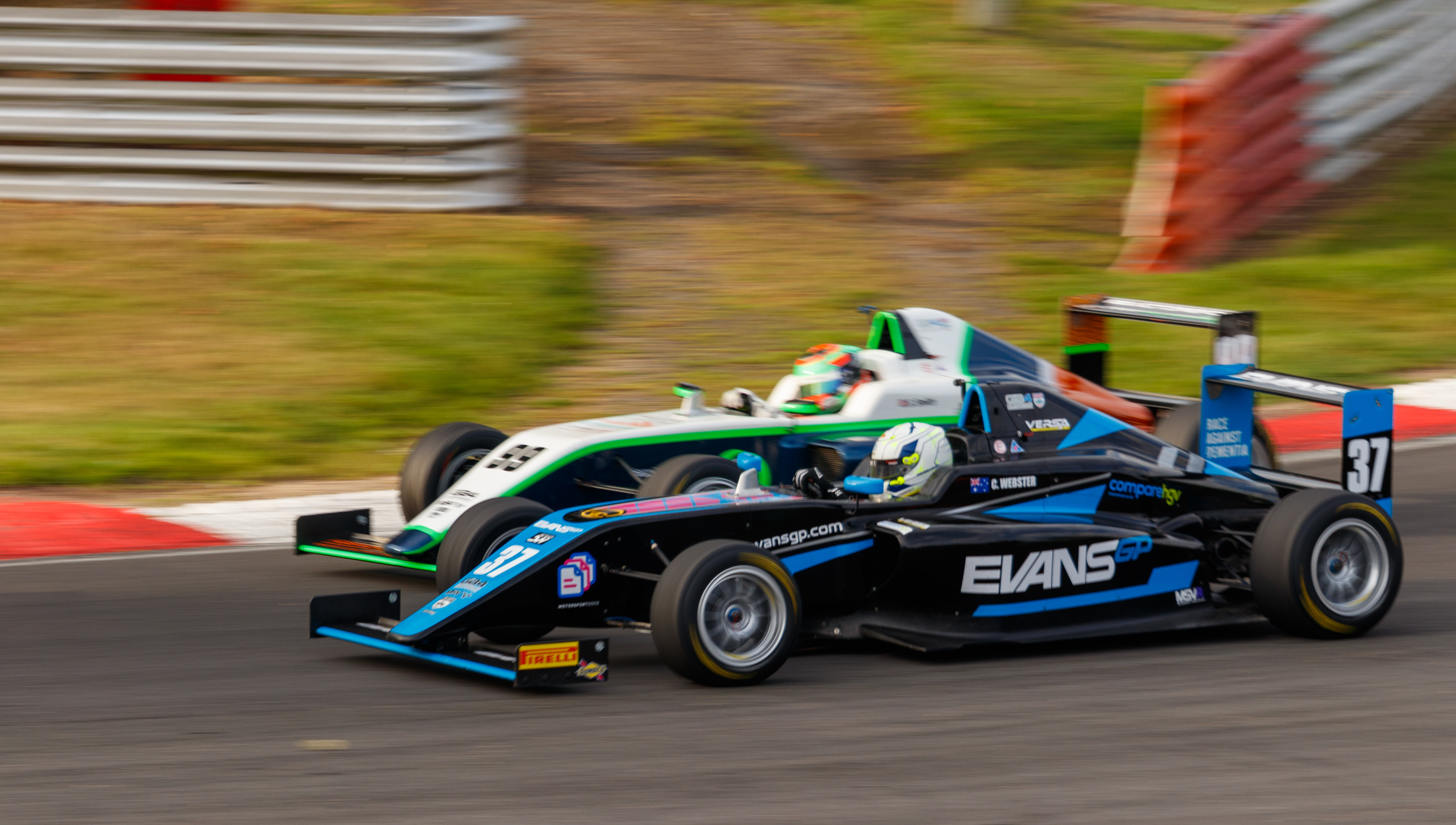
- Webster at Brands Hatch in 2023
- Nationality: (Australia) Australian
- Born: 27 March 2003 (age 23) Kilmore, Victoria, Australia

GB4 Championship career
- Debut season: 2023
- Current team: Evans GP
- Car number: 37
- Starts: 20 (22 entries)
- Wins: 5
- Podiums: 15
- Poles: 4
- Fastest laps: 6
- Best finish: 2nd in 2023

Cooper Webster (born 27 March 2003) is an Australian racing driver who last competed in the 2024 Macau Grand Prix for Evans GP. He is also an esports driver for Oracle Red Bull Racing Esports.

== Career ==
=== Karting ===
Webster started karting at the age of nine after racing BMX since the age of four. In 2016, he became champion in the KA4 Junior category of the Australian Kart Championship. In 2018, he finished third in the KA3 Junior category of the Victorian Kart Championship.

=== Hyundai Excel Championship ===
Webster started car racing in a family-run Hyundai Excel. In 2019, he became vice-champion in his first full season in the Hyundai Excel Championship.

=== S5000 Championship ===
In 2021, Webster joined Australian Racing Enterprise to make his debut in the S5000 Australian Drivers' Championship. He took his first win in the second round at Phillip Island Grand Prix Circuit and finished the season in seventh. He also joined Versa Motorsport for the opening round of the 2021 S5000 Tasman Series.

In 2022, Webster remained in the S5000 Australian Drivers' Championship and S5000 Tasman Series with Versa Motorsport. In the Australian Drivers' Championship, he took two wins en route to third in the standings. In the Tasman Series, he became vice-champion behind Nathan Herne.

In 2023, Webster remained in the S5000 Australian Drivers' Championship with the team.

=== GB4 ===
In 2023, Webster also joined Evans GP to compete in the GB4 Championship. He took his first two wins of the season at Snetterton Circuit before completing a perfect triple-win weekend in the final round at Donington Park. He ultimately became GB4 vice-champion behind Tom Mills.

=== Formula 4 ===
==== F4 Indian Championship ====
In late 2023, Webster also competed in the inaugural F4 Indian Championship. Webster drove for Chennai Turbo Riders, where he dominated the championship, winning eight races, with eleven podiums and five poles, he finished with 282.5 points.

==== Formula 4 Australian Championship ====
After Evans GP pulled out of competing in the 2024 Eurocup-3 season, they made their debut in the final round of the 2024 Formula 4 Australian Championship at the Sepang International Circuit. Webster would be a part of their lineup. He got a podium in all three races, including a win in the second race. Webster finished the championship in seventh with 58 points.

=== Eurocup-3 ===
Webster was scheduled to drive in the 2024 Eurocup-3 season with Versa Evans GP. Evans GP planned to field three cars, but after failing to sign additional drivers, the team abandoned these plans.

=== Formula Regional ===
==== FIA Formula Regional World Cup ====
Webster would make his Formula Regional debut during the 2024 Macau Grand Prix with Evans GP. He would start the race in 15th due to penalties, but would make a successful recovery drive to finish the race in fifth.

== Karting record ==
=== Karting career summary ===
Season	Series	Team	Position
2015	Australian Kart Championship - KA12		2nd
2016	Australian Kart Championship - KA4 Junior		1st
2016	IAME International Final - X30 Junior		21st
2017	Australian Kart Championship - KA4 Junior		1st
2017	Victorian State Cup - KA3 Junior		1st
2018	Victorian Kart Championship - KA3 Junior		3rd

== Racing record ==
=== Racing career summary ===
Season	Series	Team	Races	Wins	Poles	F/Laps	Podiums	Points	Position
2018	Victorian Hyundai Excel Championship		3	0	0	0	0	1	41st
2019	Victorian Hyundai Excel Championship		12	1	0	1	4	247	**2nd**
2019	Motorsport Parts Australia Excel Cup		3	0	0	0	0	115	6th
2021	S5000 Australian Drivers' Championship	Australian Racing Enterprise	12	1	0	1	1	223	7th
2021	S5000 Tasman Series	Versa Motorsport	3	0	0	0	1	48	10th
2022	S5000 Australian Drivers' Championship	Versa Motorsport	15	2	0	2	8	372	**3rd**
2022	S5000 Tasman Series	Versa Motorsport	5	0	0	0	3	166	**2nd**
2023	GB4 Championship	Evans GP	20	5	4	6	15	494	**2nd**
2023	S5000 Australian Drivers' Championship	Versa Motorsport	15	4	1	3	10	446	**3rd**
2023	F4 Indian Championship	Chennai Turbo Riders	15	8	5	7	11	282.5	**1st**
2024	Formula 4 Australian Championship	Evans GP	3	1	0	0	3	58	7th
2024	Macau Grand Prix	Evans GP	1	0	0	0	0	N/A	5th

* Season still in progress.

=== Complete S5000 results ===
Year	Series	Team	1	2	3	4	5	6	7	8	9	10	11	12	13	14	15	16	17	18	Position	Points
2021	Australian	Australian Racing Enterprise	SYM; R1; 8	SYM; R2; 7	SYM; R3; 6	PHI; R4; 8	PHI; R5; 1	PHI; R6; 6	SAN; R7; Ret	SAN; R8; 8	SAN; R9; 7	SMP; R10; 8	SMP; R11; 8	SMP; R12; 6							7th	209
2021	Tasman	Versa Motorsport	SMP; R1; 7	SMP; R2; 3	SMP; R3; 11	BAT; R4	BAT; R5	BAT; R6	BAT; R7; C												10th	48
2022	Australian	Versa Motorsport	SYM; R1; 4	SYM; R2; 5	SYM; R3; 2	PHI; R4; 3	PHI; R5; 2	PHI; R6; 3	MEL; R7; 6	MEL; R8; 3	MEL; R9; 7	SMP; R10; 6	SMP; R11; 1	SMP; R12; Ret	HID; R13; 1	HID; R14; Ret	HID; R15; 2				3rd	372
2022	Tasman	Versa Motorsport	SUR; R1; DNS	SUR; R2; 4	SUR; R3; 5	ADL; R4; 3	ADL; R5; 2	ADL; R6; 2													2nd	166
2023	Australian	Versa Motorsport	SYM; R1; 3	SYM; R2; 2	SYM; R3; 2	**PHI**; **R4**; 2	PHI; R5; 1	PHI; R6; 1	WIN; R7; 2	WIN; R8; Ret	WIN; R9; 4	SMP; R10	SMP; R11	SMP; R12	BEN; R13; 1	BEN; R14; 1	BEN; R15; 2	ADL; R16; 6	ADL; R17; DSQ	ADL; R18; 5	3rd	446

=== Complete GB4 Championship results ===
(key) (Races in bold indicate pole position) (Races in italics indicate fastest lap)

Year	Entrant	1	2	3	4	5	6	7	8	9	10	11	12	13	14	15	16	17	18	19	20	21	22	DC	Points
2023	Evans GP	OUL; 1; 3	OUL; 2; 11	OUL; 3; 9^{2}	SIL1; 1 C	SIL1; 2; 3	SIL1; 3 Ret	DON1; 1; 2	DON1; 2; 2	DON1; 3; 2	DON1; 4; 2^{9}	**SNE**; **1**; 1	**SNE**; **2**; 2	SNE; 3; 1^{10}	SIL2; 1; 4	SIL2; 2; 2	SIL2; 3 C	BRH; 1; 3	BRH; 2; 2	BRH; 3; 4	**DON2**; **1**; 1	**DON2**; **2**; 1	DON2; 3; 1^{10}	2nd	494

=== Complete F4 Indian Championship results ===
(key) (Races in bold indicate pole position) (Races in italics indicate fastest lap)

Year	Entrant	1	2	3	4	5	6	7	8	9	10	11	12	13	14	15	Pos	Points
2023	Chennai Turbo Riders	MIC1; 1; 6	MIC1; 2; 1	MIC1; 3; 1	**MIC2**; **1**; 1	MIC2; 2; 2	MIC2; 3; 3	**MIC3**; **1**; 1	MIC3; 2; 4	**MIC3**; **3**; 1	MIC3; 4; 4	MIC3; 5; 1	**MIC4**; **1**; 1	MIC4; 2; 3	**MIC4**; **3**; 1	MIC4; 4; 5	1st	282.5

=== Complete Formula 4 Australian Championship results ===
(key) (Races in bold indicate pole position; races in italics indicate fastest lap)

Year	Team	1	2	3	4	5	6	7	8	9	10	11	12	DC	Points
2024	Evans GP	BEN1; 1	BEN1; 2	BEN1; 3	BEN2; 1	BEN2; 2	BEN2; 3	SYD; 1	SYD; 2	SYD; 3	SEP; 1; 2	SEP; 2; 1	SEP; 3; 3	7th	58

=== Complete Macau Grand Prix results ===
Year	Team	Car	Qualifying	Quali Race	Main race
2024	(Australia) Evans GP	Tatuus F3 T-318	6th	15th	5th
