= Dion Gowda =

Indian racing driver (born 2007)

- ಡಿಯೋನ್ ಗೌಡ
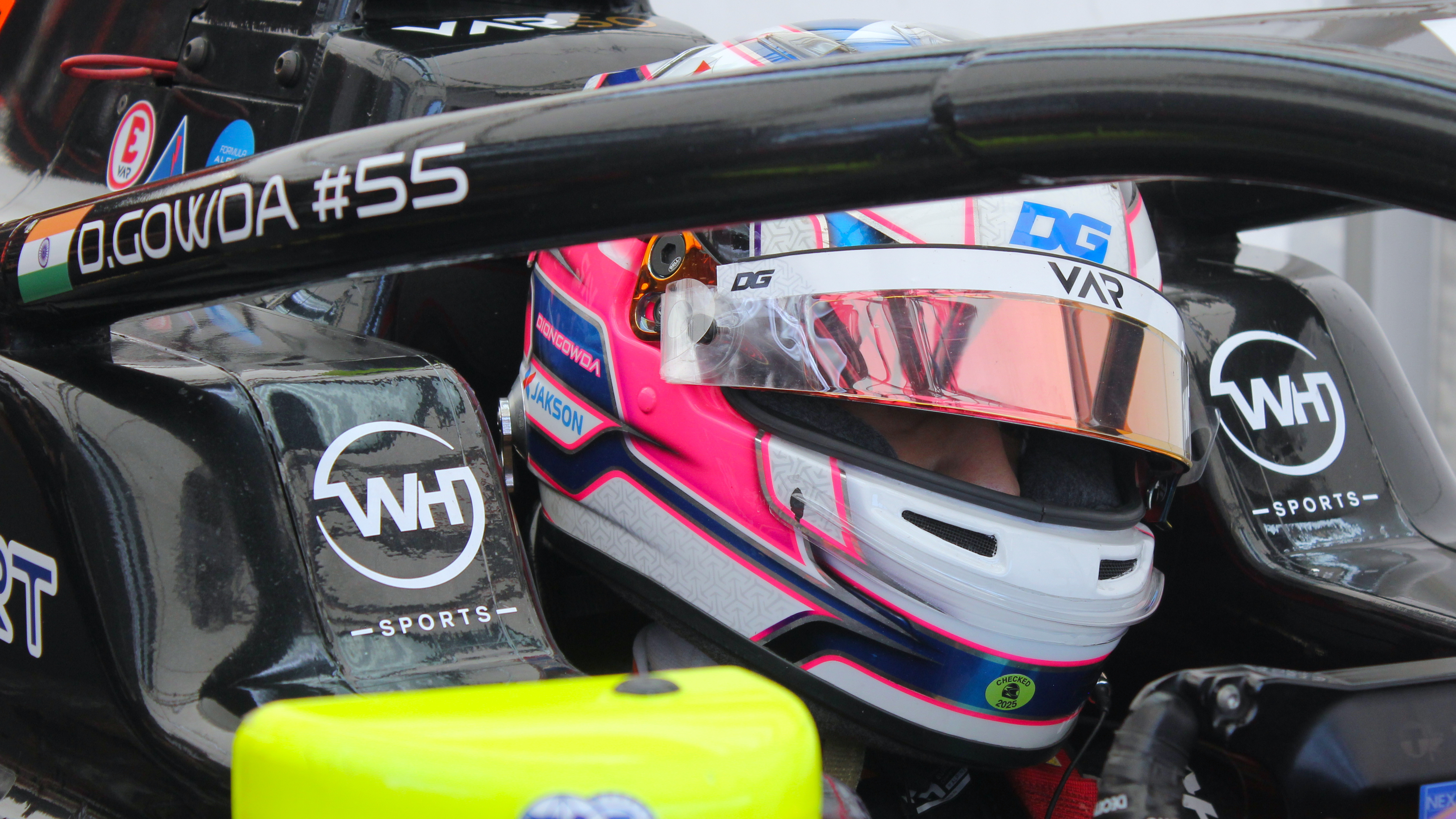
- Gowda in 2025
- Born: 30 November 2007 (age 18); Bangalore, Karnataka, India
- Nationality: (India) Indian; (United Kingdom) British (Note: Gowda is Indian but competes under a British licence.)

Formula Regional European Championship career
- Debut season: 2025
- Former teams: Van Amersfoort Racing
- Starts: 39
- Wins: 0
- Podiums: 0
- Poles: 0
- Fastest laps: 1
- Best finish: 12th in 2025
- Statistics up to date as of 19 October 2026.

Previous series
- 2026; 2025; 2025–2026; 2024; 2024; 2023–2024; 2023; 2023: FR Middle East; GB3; FR European; Euro 4; Italian F4; F4 UAE; F4 British; F4 Indian

Dion Gowda (Kannada: ಡಿಯೋನ್ ಗೌಡ; born 30 November 2007) is an Indian racing driver who is set to compete under the British flag in the FIA Formula 3 Championship for LN4 Fusion.

Born and raised in Bangalore, Gowda has competed in the 2024 Italian F4 Championship with Prema Racing, finishing eleventh. He then raced in Formula Regional Europe with Van Amersfoort Racing for the next two years.

== Career ==
=== Karting (2015–2022) ===
Gowda had a mixed karting career, after starting in the sport at the age of eight. He started karting in Europe in 2018, where he finished 37th in the WSK Final Cup, in the 60 Mini category. He continued in the category for 2019, where he finished seventh in the South Garda Winter Cup. Later in the year, Gowda stepped up to the OKJ category, in which he would compete in for 2020. His best result over the course of 2020 was an eighth place in the WSK Champions Cup at the start of the year. Gowda remained in the category for 2021, as well as taking part in the Karting Academy Trophy, where he finished a career-high fifth in the standings, after taking his first podium at the event in Wackersdorf. For 2022, Gowda stepped up to OK karting, where he struggled and only managed to take a best result of 29th place in the championship, achieved in the WSK Super Master Series.

=== Formula 4 (2023–2024) ===
==== 2023 ====
Gowda was announced to be moving to cars for the 2023 season, by joining the grid for the 2023 Formula 4 UAE Championship. He had a tough season driving for Carlin, but he showed promise by finishing in the points on two occasions and ending the season in 25th in the standings.

For the remainder of the 2023 season, Gowda joined Rodin Carlin for a full season of the 2023 F4 British Championship. He had a strong season in the championship, showing his capabilities as a racing driver by finishing in fourth place in the championship, taking four wins and six podiums on his way to a points tally of 226.

==== 2024 ====
Gowda would rejoin the championship in 2024, as he joined reigning champions Mumbai Falcons. Gowda had a more impressive and consistent season than his previous season, and he scored a podium over the course of the fifteen races. He finished 11th in the standings with 65 points to his name at season's end.

After his encouraging campaign in the F4 British Championship the previous year, Prema Racing signed Gowda for a full Italian F4 and Euro 4 campaign in 2024. He made a decent start to his Italian F4 season, with two podiums at Imola, but ended the championship in 11th place after low scoring rounds for the rest of the season. Gowda also finished 14th in Euro 4 campaign.

=== Formula Regional (2025–2026) ===
==== 2025 ====
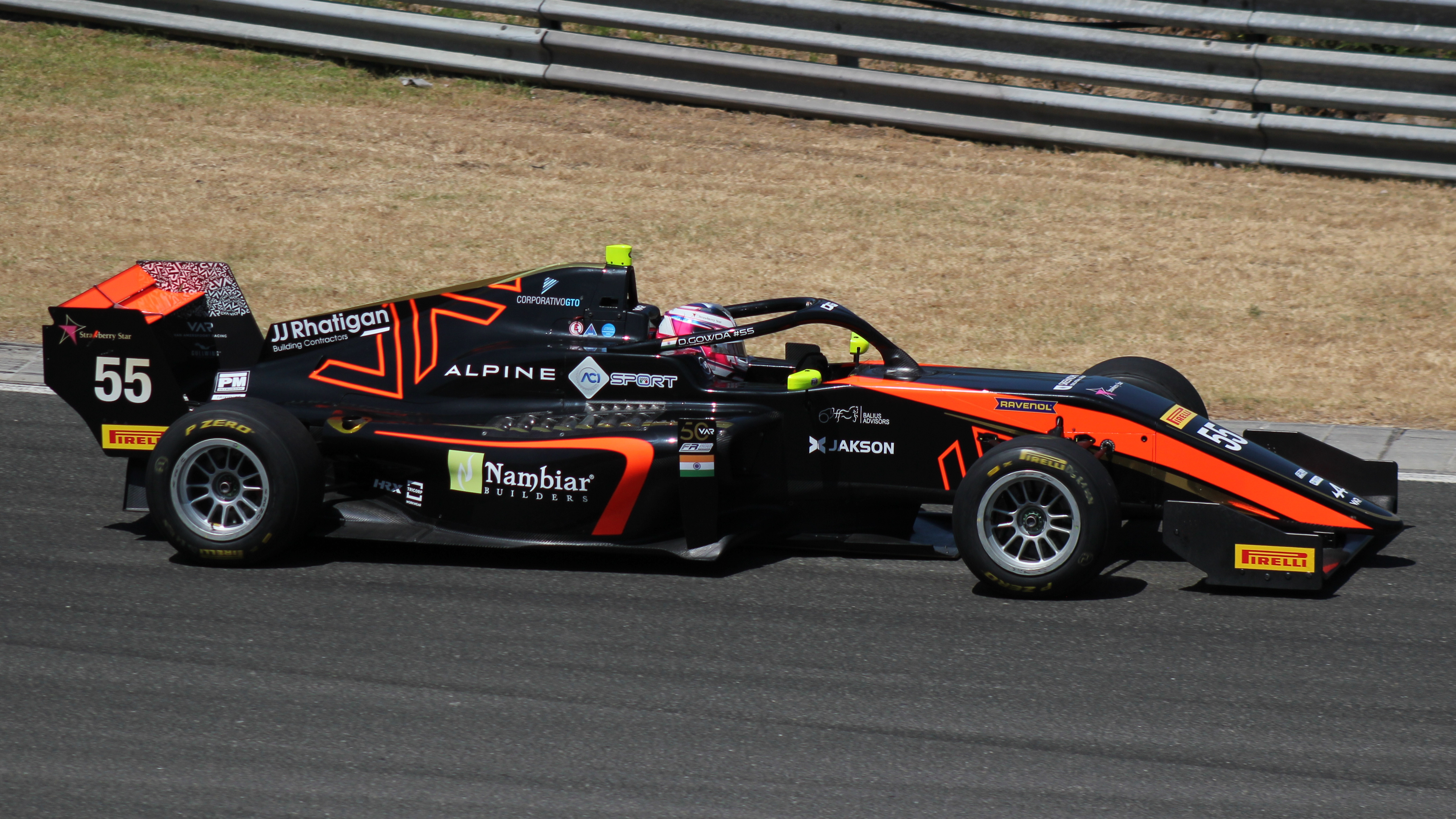
Gowda driving at the Hungaroring during the 2025 Formula Regional European Championship

Gowda stepped up to the Formula Regional European Championship with Van Amersfoort Racing in 2025.

That year, Gowda also competed in the GB3 Championship for Xcel Motorsport alongside his main Formula Regional campaign.

==== 2026 ====
Gowda started the year by competing in the winter Formula Regional Middle East Trophy with Van Amersfoort Racing.

For his main season, Gowda was retained by Van Amersfoort to compete in the Formula Regional European Championship.

=== FIA Formula 3 (2027–) ===
Gowda will move up to FIA Formula 3 in 2027, joining new entrants LN4 Fusion alongside junior formula champions James Egozi and Gabriel Gomez.

== Karting record ==
=== Karting career summary ===
Season	Series	Team	Position
2018	WSK Final Cup - 60 Mini	BabyRace Driver Academy	37th
2018	ROK Cup International Final - Mini ROK	BabyRace Driver Academy	11th
2018	Macau International Kart Grand Prix - Mini ROK	BabyRace Driver Academy	10th
2018	ROK Cup Asia - Mini ROK	Eugene - GP Racing	7th
2019	WSK Champions Cup - 60 Mini	BabyRace Driver Academy	15th
2019	WSK Super Master Series - 60 Mini	BabyRace Driver Academy	48th
2019	South Garda Winter Cup - Mini ROK	BabyRace Driver Academy	7th
2019	WSK Euro Series - 60 Mini	BabyRace Driver Academy	34th
2019	WSK Open Cup - OKJ	Ricky Flynn Motorsport	47th
2019	WSK Final Cup - OKJ	Ricky Flynn Motorsport	NC
2019	Deutsche Kart Meisterschaft - OKJ	Ricky Flynn Motorsport	NC
2019	IAME Asia Cup - Cadet	Eugene Motorsports	12th
2020	WSK Champions Cup - OKJ	Ricky Flynn Motorsport	8th
2020	WSK Super Master Series - OKJ	Ricky Flynn Motorsport	20th
2020	South Garda Winter Cup - OKJ	Ricky Flynn Motorsport	24th
2020	WSK Euro Series - OKJ	Ricky Flynn Motorsport	15th
2020	Champions of the Future - OKJ	Ricky Flynn Motorsport	28th
2020	CIK-FIA European Championship - OKJ	Ricky Flynn Motorsport	24th
2020	CIK-FIA World Championship - OKJ	Ricky Flynn Motorsport	34th
2020	WSK Open Cup - OKJ	Ricky Flynn Motorsport	13th
2021	WSK Champions Cup - OKJ	Ricky Flynn Motorsport	34th
2021	WSK Super Master Series - OKJ	Ricky Flynn Motorsport	21st
2021	WSK Euro Series - OKJ	Ricky Flynn Motorsport	17th
2021	Champions of the Future - OKJ	Ricky Flynn Motorsport	8th
2021	CIK-FIA European Championship - OKJ	Ricky Flynn Motorsport	23rd
2021	CIK-FIA Academy Trophy		5th
2021	WSK Open Cup - OKJ	Ricky Flynn Motorsport	13th
2021	CIK-FIA World Championship - OKJ	Ricky Flynn Motorsport	9th
2021	South Garda Winter Cup - OKJ	Ricky Flynn Motorsport	29th
2021	WSK Final Cup - OKJ	Ricky Flynn Motorsport	21st
2022	WSK Super Master Series - OK	Ricky Flynn Motorsport	29th
2022	Champions of the Future Winter Series - OK	Ricky Flynn Motorsport	NC
2022	Champions of the Future - OK	Ricky Flynn Motorsport	42nd
2022	CIK-FIA European Championship - OK	Ricky Flynn Motorsport	39th

=== Complete Macao International Kart Grand Prix results ===
Year	Series	Team	Class	Pre-Final	Final
2018	Asian Karting Open Championship	Baby Race Driver Academy	Mini ROK	?	16th

== Racing record ==
=== Racing career summary ===
Season	Series	Team	Races	Wins	Poles	F/Laps	Podiums	Points	Position
2023	Formula 4 UAE Championship	Carlin	15	0	0	0	0	5	25th
2023	F4 British Championship	Rodin Carlin	29	4	4	1	6	226	4th
2023	F4 Indian Championship	Chennai Turbo Riders	3	1	0	1	1	24.5	11th
2023	Formula 4 UAE Championship - Trophy Round	Xcel Motorsport	2	0	0	0	0	N/A	NC
2024	Formula 4 UAE Championship	Mumbai Falcons Racing Limited	15	0	0	0	1	65	11th
2024	Italian F4 Championship	Prema Racing	21	0	0	0	2	62	11th
2024	Euro 4 Championship	Prema Racing	9	0	0	1	0	16	14th
2025	Formula Regional European Championship	Van Amersfoort Racing	20	0	0	0	0	38	12th
2025	GB3 Championship	Xcel Motorsport	6	0	0	0	0	40	25th
2026	Formula Regional Middle East Trophy	Van Amersfoort Racing	10	0	0	0	0	1	24th
2026	Formula Regional European Championship	Van Amersfoort Racing	19	0	0	1	0	25	20th
2027	FIA Formula 3 Championship	LN4 Fusion	0	0	0	0	0	0	TBD

=== Complete Formula 4 UAE Championship results ===
(key) (Races in bold indicate pole position) (Races in italics indicate fastest lap)

Year	Team	1	2	3	4	5	6	7	8	9	10	11	12	13	14	15	DC	Points
2023	Carlin	DUB1; 1; 14	DUB1; 2; 10	DUB1; 3; 20	KMT1; 1 Ret	KMT1; 2; 22	KMT1; 3; 12	KMT2; 1; 13	KMT2; 2; 15	KMT2; 3; 8	DUB2; 1; 11	DUB2; 2; 33	DUB2; 3; 13	YMC; 1; 16	YMC; 2; 20	YMC; 3; 26	25th	5
2024	Mumbai Falcons Racing Limited	YMC1; 1; 6	YMC1; 2 Ret	YMC1; 3 Ret	YMC2; 1; 11	YMC2; 2 Ret	YMC2; 3 Ret	DUB1; 1; 3	DUB1; 2; 4	DUB1; 3; 11	YMC3; 1; 6	YMC3; 2; 26†	YMC3; 3; 5	DUB2; 1; 14	DUB2; 2; 12	DUB2; 3; 4	11th	65

=== Complete F4 British Championship results ===
(key) (Races in bold indicate pole position; races in italics indicate fastest lap)

Year	Team	1	2	3	4	5	6	7	8	9	10	11	12	13	14	15	16	17	18	19	20	21	22	23	24	25	26	27	28	29	30	31	DC	Points
2023	Rodin Carlin	DPN; 1; 4	DPN; 2; 8^{10}	DPN; 3; 2	BHI; 1; 9	BHI; 2; 1^{1}	BHI; 3; 10	**SNE**; **1** C	SNE; 2; 10^{10}	**SNE**; **3**; 1	THR; 1; 7	THR; 2; 3^{8}	THR; 3 Ret	OUL; 1; 5	OUL; 2; 18^{2}	OUL; 3; 5	SIL; 1; 11	SIL; 2; 5^{10}	SIL; 3; 5	CRO; 1; 6	CRO; 2; 9^{5}	CRO; 3; 4	KNO; 1; 13	KNO; 2 Ret	**KNO**; **3**; 1	DPGP; 1 Ret	**DPGP**; **2**; 1	DPGP; 3; 9^{5}	DPGP; 4; 17	BHGP; 1 EX	BHGP; 2; 12^{3}	BHGP; 3; 9	4th	226

=== Complete F4 Indian Championship results ===
(key) (Races in bold indicate pole position) (Races in italics indicate fastest lap)

Year	Entrant	1	2	3	4	5	6	7	8	9	10	11	12	13	14	15	Pos	Points
2023	Chennai Turbo Riders	MIC1; 1	MIC1; 2	MIC1; 3	MIC2; 1; 4	MIC2; 2 Ret	MIC2; 3; 1	MIC3; 1	MIC3; 2	MIC3; 3	MIC3; 4	MIC3; 5	MIC4; 1	MIC4; 2	MIC4; 3	MIC4; 4	11th	24.5

=== Complete Italian F4 Championship results ===
(key) (Races in bold indicate pole position; races in italics indicate fastest lap)

Year	Team	1	2	3	4	5	6	7	8	9	10	11	12	13	14	15	16	17	18	19	20	21	DC	Points
2024	Prema Racing	MIS; 1; 11	MIS; 2; 7	MIS; 3; 9	IMO; 1; 3	IMO; 2; 3	IMO; 3; 10	VLL; 1; 20	VLL; 2; 9	VLL; 3; 14	MUG; 1; 15	MUG; 2; 11	MUG; 3; 10	LEC; 1; 8	LEC; 2; 11	LEC; 3; 7	CAT; 1; 7	CAT; 2; 17	CAT; 3; 16	MNZ; 1; 18	MNZ; 2 Ret	MNZ; 3; 8	11th	62

=== Complete Euro 4 Championship results ===
(key) (Races in bold indicate pole position; races in italics indicate fastest lap)

Year	Team	1	2	3	4	5	6	7	8	9	DC	Points
2024	Prema Racing	MUG; 1; 6	MUG; 2; 15	MUG; 3; 7	RBR; 1 Ret	RBR; 2; 16	RBR; 3; 9	MNZ; 1; 15	MNZ; 2; 11	MNZ; 3; 16	14th	16

=== Complete Formula Regional European Championship results ===
(key) (Races in bold indicate pole position) (Races in italics indicate fastest lap)

Year	Team	1	2	3	4	5	6	7	8	9	10	11	12	13	14	15	16	17	18	19	20	DC	Points
2025	Van Amersfoort Racing	MIS; 1; 17	MIS; 2 Ret	SPA; 1; 14	SPA; 2; 5	ZAN; 1; 10	ZAN; 2; 7	HUN; 1; 10	HUN; 2; 15	LEC; 1; 16	LEC; 2; 16	IMO; 1; 8	IMO; 2; 15	RBR; 1; 13	RBR; 2; 13	CAT; 1; 13	CAT; 2; 13	HOC; 1; 17	HOC; 2; 5	MNZ; 1; 7	MNZ; 2 Ret	12th	38
2026	Van Amersfoort Racing	RBR; 1; 13	RBR; 2; 4	RBR; 3; 6	ZAN; 1; 9	ZAN; 2; 10	SPA; 1 Ret	SPA; 2 C	SPA; 3; 28†	MNZ; 1; 15	MNZ; 2; 17	MNZ; 3; 13	HUN; 1; 21	HUN; 2; 27	LEC; 1; 19	LEC; 2; 18	IMO; 1; 16	IMO; 2; 16	IMO; 3; 7	HOC; 1 Ret	HOC; 2; 24	20th	25

^{†} Did not finish, but was classified as he had completed more than 90% of the race distance.

=== Complete GB3 Championship results ===
(key) (Races in bold indicate pole position) (Races in italics indicate fastest lap)

Year	Team	1	2	3	4	5	6	7	8	9	10	11	12	13	14	15	16	17	18	19	20	21	22	23	24	DC	Points
2025	Xcel Motorsport	SIL1; 1; 10	SIL1; 2 Ret	SIL1; 3 Ret	ZAN; 1	ZAN; 2	ZAN; 3	SPA; 1; 14	SPA; 2; 9	SPA; 3; 6	HUN; 1	HUN; 2	HUN; 3	SIL2; 1	SIL2; 2	SIL2; 3	BRH; 1	BRH; 2	BRH; 3	DON; 1	DON; 2	DON; 3	MNZ; 1	MNZ; 2	MNZ; 3	25th	40

=== Complete Formula Regional Middle East Trophy results ===
(key) (Races in bold indicate pole position) (Races in italics indicate fastest lap)

Year	Entrant	1	2	3	4	5	6	7	8	9	10	11	12	DC	Points
2026	Van Amersfoort Racing	YMC1; 1; 23	YMC1; 2; 12	YMC1; 3; 11	YMC2; 1; 22	YMC2; 2; 17	YMC2; 3 Ret	DUB; 1; 15	DUB; 2 DNS	DUB; 3; 10	LUS; 1; 23	LUS; 2 C	LUS; 3; 17	24th	1

=== Complete FIA Formula 3 Championship results ===
(key) (Races in bold indicate pole position) (Races in italics indicate fastest lap)

Year	Entrant	1	2	3	4	5	6	7	8	9	10	11	12	13	14	15	16	17	18	19	20	DC	Points
2027	LN4 Fusion	BHR; SPR	BHR; FEA	JED; SPR	JED; FEA	MEL; SPR	MEL; FEA	MTL; SPR	MTL; FEA	MON; SPR	MON; FEA	SIL; SPR	SIL; FEA	RBR; SPR	RBR; FEA	MNZ; SPR	MNZ; FEA	MAD; SPR	MAD; FEA	IST; SPR	IST; FEA	TBD	TBD
