= 2023 S5000 Australian Drivers' Championship =

Motorsport contest

The 2023 S5000 Australian Drivers' Championship was the third and final season of the S5000 Australian Drivers' Championship. The championship was held under the new unified SpeedSeries banner, promoted and organized jointly by Motorsport Australia and the Australian Racing Group.

Drivers not only competed to win the Australian Drivers' Championship (the MA Gold Star), the last round of the season also doubled as the third edition of the S5000 Tasman Series.

At the first race of this last round, GRM driver Aaron Cameron won the Drivers' Championship. After claiming three victories from three races through the weekend, he also became the Tasman Series Champion.

Through the end of the 2023 season, discussions about the future of the series arose. Particularly the eligibility rules for a Supercar license de facto mandating a stint in the Super2 series were accused to draw interest away from the S5000 championship. After these arguments could not be resolved, the championship was parked indefinitely at the beginning of 2024. On 9 January 2025, category promoter GRM confirmed that the championship would not be revived. The title of Australian Drivers' Championship meanwhile was claimed by the Australian Auto-Sport Alliance (AASA), with the promoter organizing their own championship awarding the title from 2024 onwards.

== Teams and drivers ==
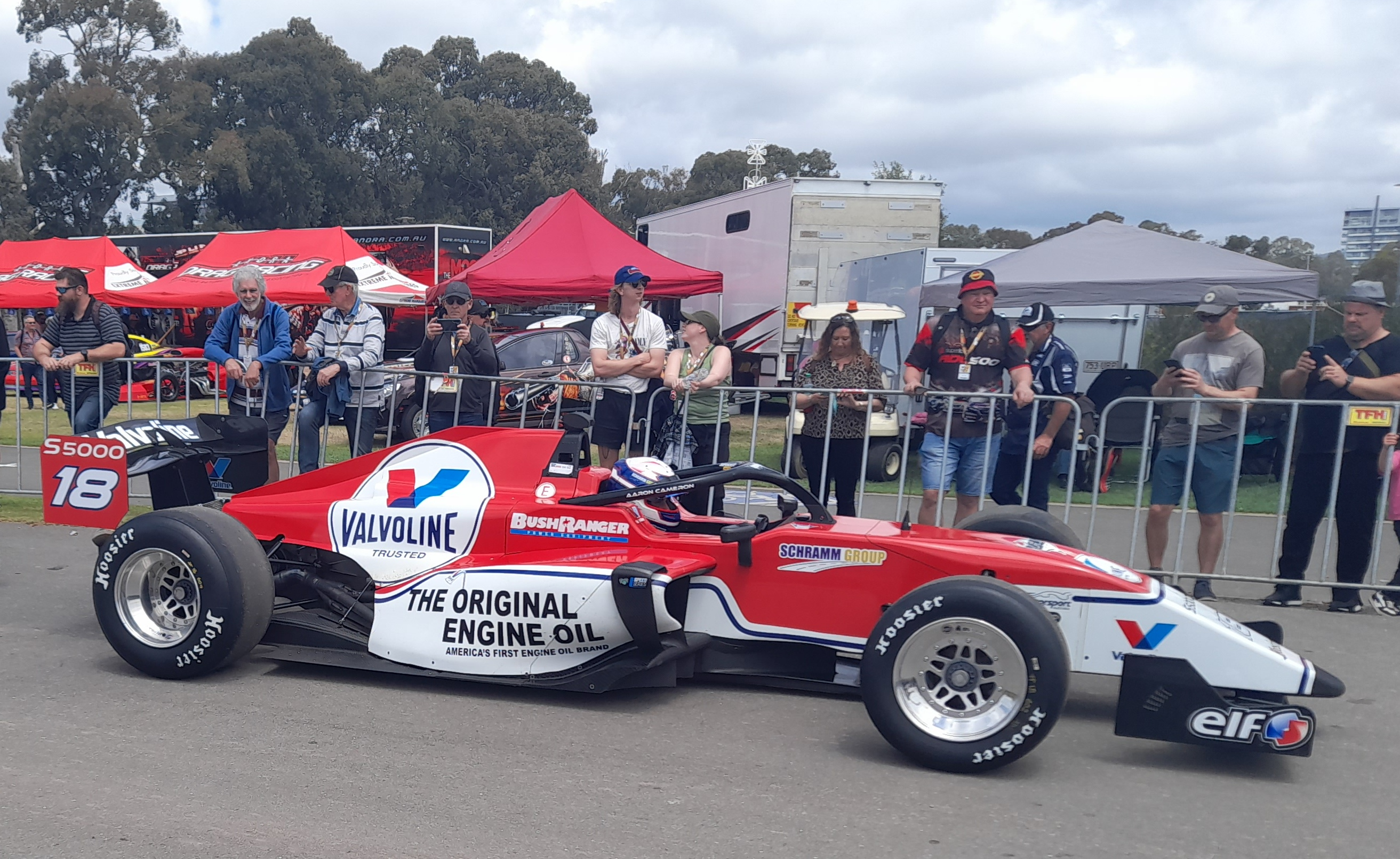
Aaron Cameron won the championship driving for Garry Rogers Motorsport

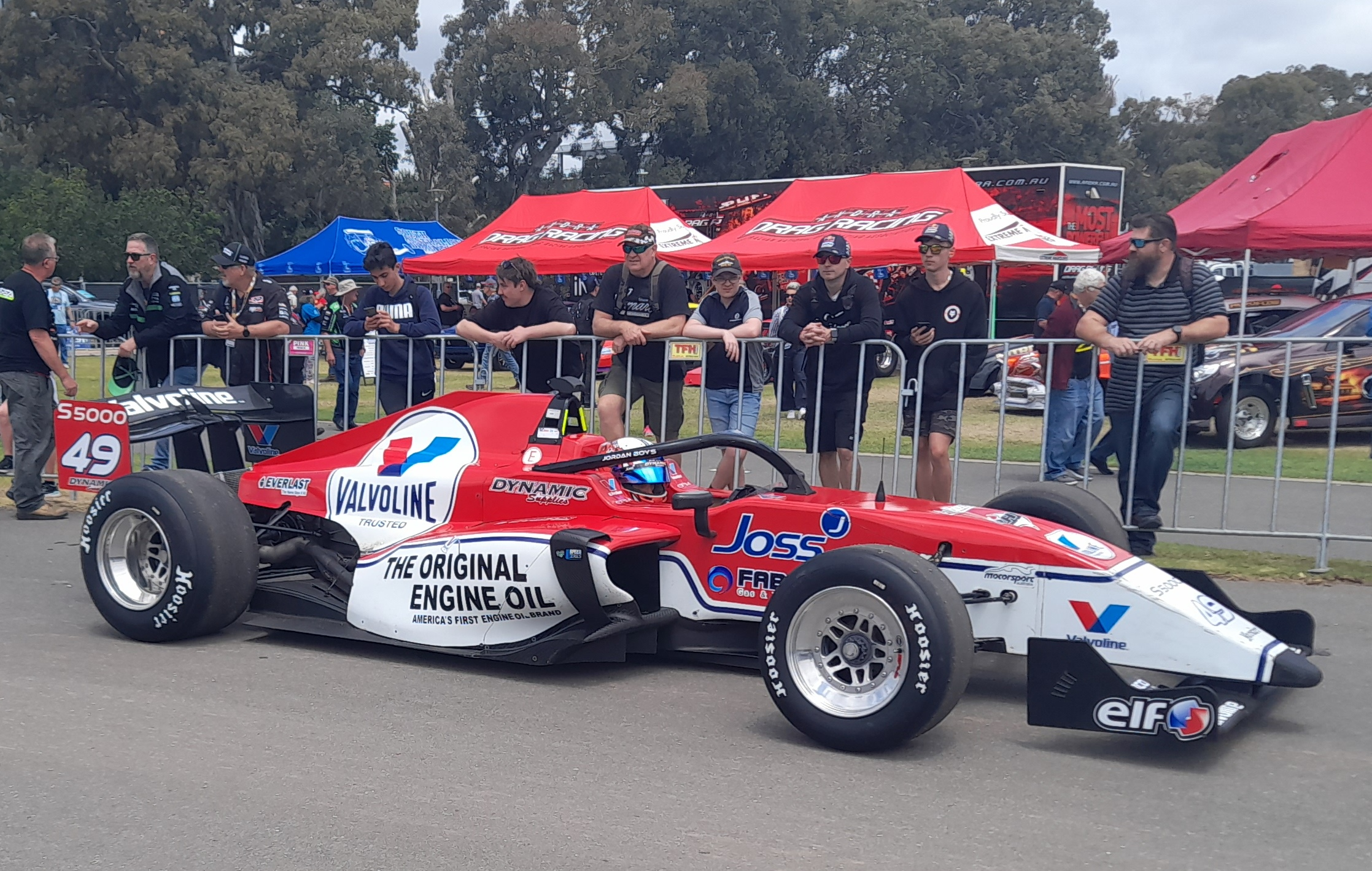
Jordan Boys placed second driving for Garry Rogers Motorsport

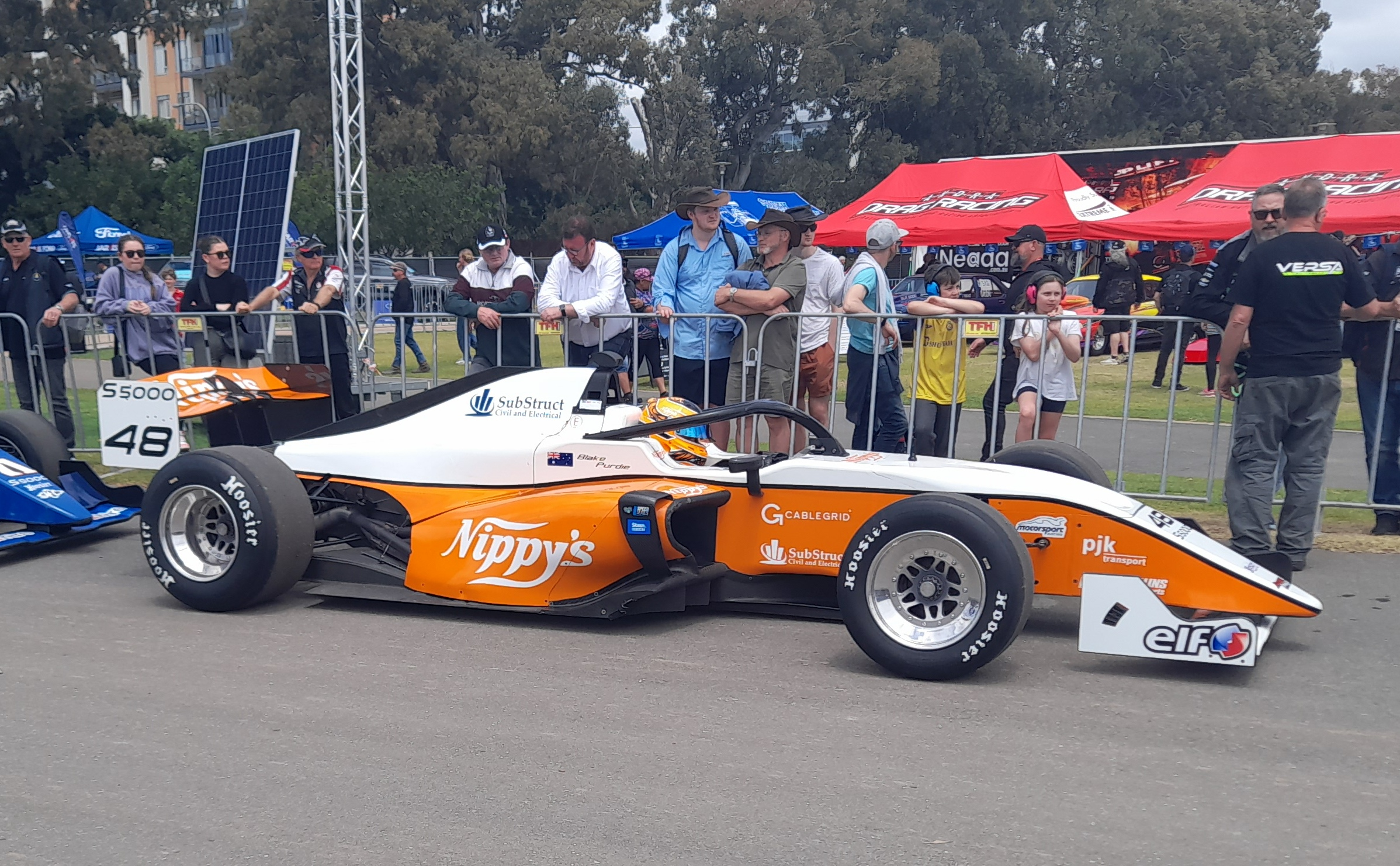
Blake Purdie placed fifth driving for Versa Motorsport

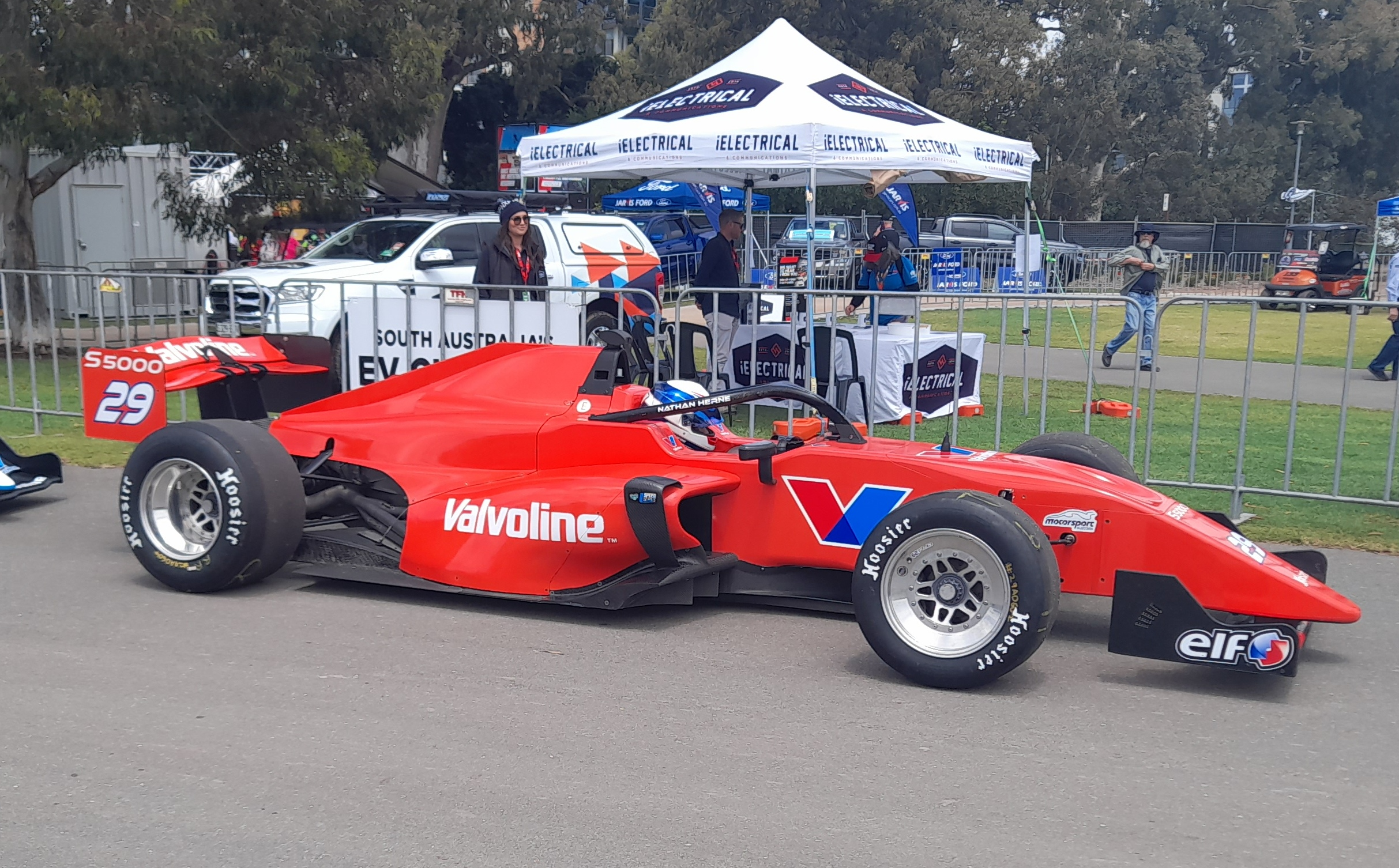
Nathan Herne placed 15th driving for Garry Rogers Motorsport

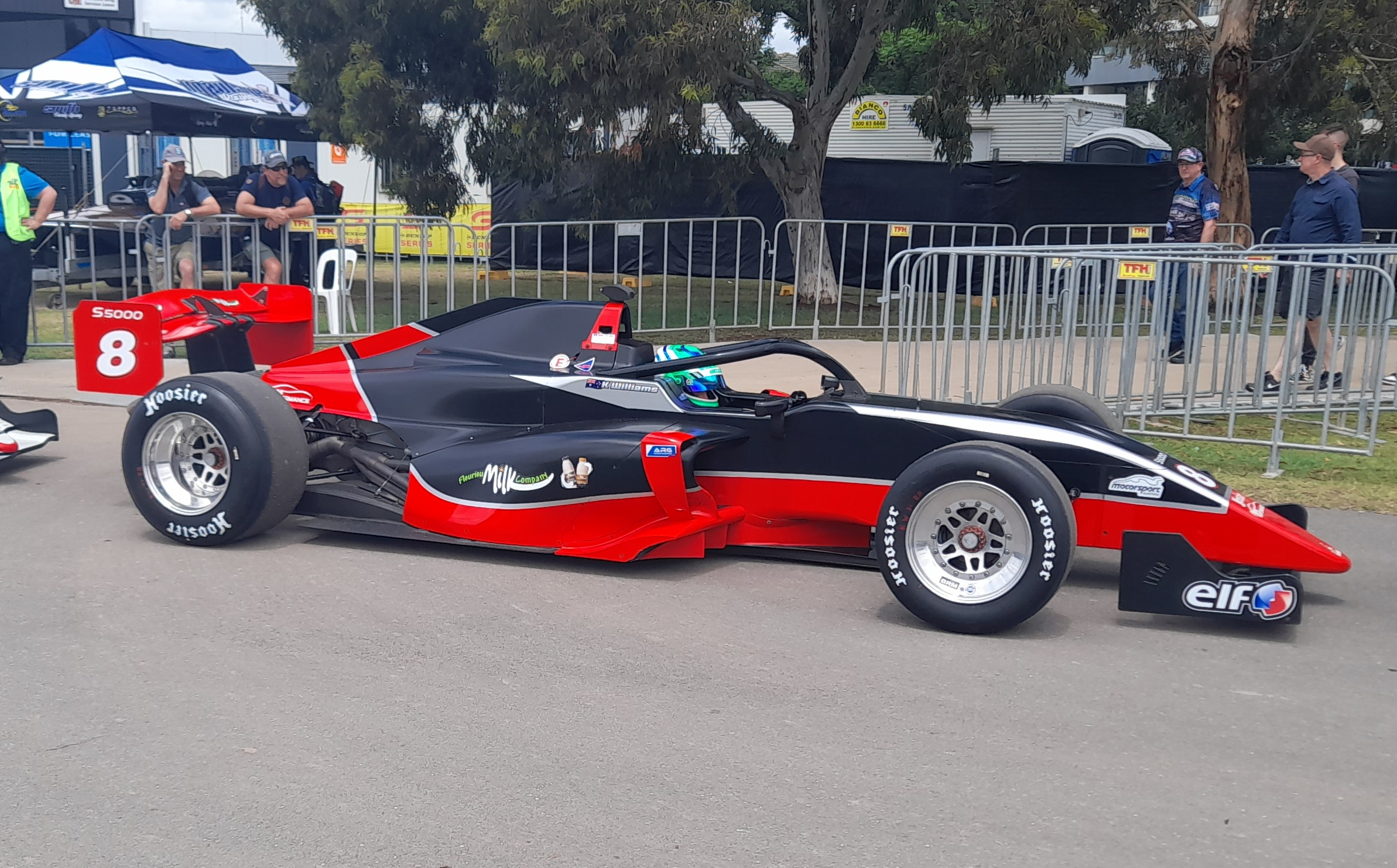
Kobi Williams placed 16th driving for 88Racing

All teams competed with identical Rogers AF01/V8 single-seater racecars, Ligier/Onroak chassis powered by Ford Coyote V8 engines. For the 2023 season, a Pro-Am class was to be introduced, but it received no entries.

Team	No.	Driver	Rounds
88Racing	1	(Australia) Joey Mawson	1–3
88Racing	8	(Australia) Kobi Williams	6
88Racing	88	(Australia) Aaron Love	4–5
88Racing	88	(Spain) Roberto Merhi	6 (Note: Merhi was entered into round 6, but withdrew after falling ill ahead of the event.)
88Racing	88	(New Zealand) Kaleb Ngatoa	6
Team BRM	2	(Australia) Mark Rosser	All
Team BRM	3	(Australia) Zane Goddard	1
Versa Motorsport	12	(Australia) Matt McLean	1
Versa Motorsport	28	(Australia) Winston Smith	2–3
Versa Motorsport	37	(Australia) Cooper Webster	1–3, 5–6
Versa Motorsport	48	(Australia) Blake Purdie	All
Garry Rogers Motorsport	18	(Australia) Aaron Cameron	All
Garry Rogers Motorsport	29	(Australia) Nathan Herne	6
Garry Rogers Motorsport	31	(Australia) James Golding	1–3
Garry Rogers Motorsport	41	(Australia) Kody Garland	4–5
Garry Rogers Motorsport	49	(Australia) Jordan Boys	All
Garry Rogers Motorsport	96	(Australia) Nic Carroll	All
Garry Rogers Motorsport	98	(Spain) Roberto Merhi	1
Amadio Motorsport	22	(Australia) Sebastian Amadio	4, 6
Bargwanna Motorsport	71	(Australia) Ben Bargwanna	4–6

== Race calendar ==
The calendar for the third S5000 season was announced on 7 December 2022. After two years of holding the main S5000 season and the S5000 Tasman series as separate championships over five and two rounds respectively, this changed in 2023. All six rounds now counted towards the main S5000 Australian Drivers' Championship, with the last round also counting towards the S5000 Tasman Series.

The category debuted at Winton Raceway, while rounds at Albert Park and the Hidden Valley Raceway were not part of the calendar. The second round was later confirmed to be held at Phillip Island Grand Prix Circuit, while an originally planned round between the races at Tailem Bend and Adelaide did not come about.

Round		Circuit	Location	Date	Supporting	Map of circuit locations
1	R1	(Tasmania) Symmons Plains Raceway	Launceston, Tasmania	25 February	TCR Australia Touring Car Series; Touring Car Masters; Trans-Am Australia; Tassie Tin Tops	2023 S5000 Australian Drivers' Championship is located in Australia
1	R2	(Tasmania) Symmons Plains Raceway	Launceston, Tasmania	26 February	TCR Australia Touring Car Series; Touring Car Masters; Trans-Am Australia; Tassie Tin Tops	2023 S5000 Australian Drivers' Championship is located in Australia
1	R3	(Tasmania) Symmons Plains Raceway	Launceston, Tasmania	26 February	TCR Australia Touring Car Series; Touring Car Masters; Trans-Am Australia; Tassie Tin Tops	2023 S5000 Australian Drivers' Championship is located in Australia
2	R1	(Victoria (state)) Phillip Island Grand Prix Circuit	Ventnor, Victoria	13 May	TCR Australia Touring Car Series; Trans-Am Australia; V8 Touring Cars; GT World Challenge Australia	2023 S5000 Australian Drivers' Championship is located in Australia
2	R2	(Victoria (state)) Phillip Island Grand Prix Circuit	Ventnor, Victoria	14 May	TCR Australia Touring Car Series; Trans-Am Australia; V8 Touring Cars; GT World Challenge Australia	2023 S5000 Australian Drivers' Championship is located in Australia
2	R3	(Victoria (state)) Phillip Island Grand Prix Circuit	Ventnor, Victoria	14 May	TCR Australia Touring Car Series; Trans-Am Australia; V8 Touring Cars; GT World Challenge Australia	2023 S5000 Australian Drivers' Championship is located in Australia
3	R1	(Victoria (state)) Winton Motor Raceway	Winton, Victoria	10 June	TCR Australia Touring Car Series; Touring Car Masters; Trans-Am Australia; V8 Touring Cars	2023 S5000 Australian Drivers' Championship is located in Australia
3	R2	(Victoria (state)) Winton Motor Raceway	Winton, Victoria	11 June	TCR Australia Touring Car Series; Touring Car Masters; Trans-Am Australia; V8 Touring Cars	2023 S5000 Australian Drivers' Championship is located in Australia
3	R3	(Victoria (state)) Winton Motor Raceway	Winton, Victoria	11 June	TCR Australia Touring Car Series; Touring Car Masters; Trans-Am Australia; V8 Touring Cars	2023 S5000 Australian Drivers' Championship is located in Australia
4	R1	(New South Wales) Sydney Motorsports Park	Eastern Creek, New South Wales	29 July	Supercars Championship; GT World Challenge Australia; Porsche Sprint Challenge Australia; TGR Australia 86 Series	2023 S5000 Australian Drivers' Championship is located in Australia
4	R2	(New South Wales) Sydney Motorsports Park	Eastern Creek, New South Wales	30 July	Supercars Championship; GT World Challenge Australia; Porsche Sprint Challenge Australia; TGR Australia 86 Series	2023 S5000 Australian Drivers' Championship is located in Australia
4	R3	(New South Wales) Sydney Motorsports Park	Eastern Creek, New South Wales	30 July	Supercars Championship; GT World Challenge Australia; Porsche Sprint Challenge Australia; TGR Australia 86 Series	2023 S5000 Australian Drivers' Championship is located in Australia
5	R1	(South Australia) The Bend Motorsports Park	Tailem Bend, South Australia	19 August	Supercars Championship; Porsche Carrera Cup Australia; V8 SuperUte Series; TGR Australia 86 Series	2023 S5000 Australian Drivers' Championship is located in Australia
5	R2	(South Australia) The Bend Motorsports Park	Tailem Bend, South Australia	19 August	Supercars Championship; Porsche Carrera Cup Australia; V8 SuperUte Series; TGR Australia 86 Series	2023 S5000 Australian Drivers' Championship is located in Australia
5	R3	(South Australia) The Bend Motorsports Park	Tailem Bend, South Australia	20 August	Supercars Championship; Porsche Carrera Cup Australia; V8 SuperUte Series; TGR Australia 86 Series	2023 S5000 Australian Drivers' Championship is located in Australia
2023 S5000 Tasman Series						2023 S5000 Australian Drivers' Championship is located in Australia
6	R1	(South Australia) Adelaide Street Circuit	Adelaide, South Australia	24 November	Supercars Championship; GT World Challenge Australia; Porsche Carrera Cup Australia; Super2/Super3 Series	2023 S5000 Australian Drivers' Championship is located in Australia
6	R2	(South Australia) Adelaide Street Circuit	Adelaide, South Australia	25 November	Supercars Championship; GT World Challenge Australia; Porsche Carrera Cup Australia; Super2/Super3 Series	2023 S5000 Australian Drivers' Championship is located in Australia
6	R3	(South Australia) Adelaide Street Circuit	Adelaide, South Australia	26 November	Supercars Championship; GT World Challenge Australia; Porsche Carrera Cup Australia; Super2/Super3 Series	2023 S5000 Australian Drivers' Championship is located in Australia

== Race results ==
Round		Circuit	Pole position	Fastest lap	Winning driver	Winning entrant
1	R1	(Tasmania) Symmons Plains Raceway	(Australia) Joey Mawson	(Australia) Joey Mawson	(Australia) Joey Mawson	88Racing
1	R2	(Tasmania) Symmons Plains Raceway		(Australia) Joey Mawson	(Australia) Joey Mawson	88Racing
1	R3	(Tasmania) Symmons Plains Raceway		(Spain) Roberto Merhi	(Australia) Joey Mawson	88Racing
2	R1	(Victoria (state)) Phillip Island Grand Prix Circuit	(Australia) Cooper Webster	(Australia) Joey Mawson	(Australia) Joey Mawson	88Racing
2	R2	(Victoria (state)) Phillip Island Grand Prix Circuit		(Australia) Joey Mawson	(Australia) Cooper Webster	Versa Motorsport
2	R3	(Victoria (state)) Phillip Island Grand Prix Circuit		(Australia) Cooper Webster	(Australia) Cooper Webster	Versa Motorsport
3	R1	(Victoria (state)) Winton Motor Raceway	(Australia) James Golding	(Australia) James Golding	(Australia) Joey Mawson	88Racing
3	R2	(Victoria (state)) Winton Motor Raceway		(Australia) Joey Mawson	(Australia) Joey Mawson	88Racing
3	R3	(Victoria (state)) Winton Motor Raceway		(Australia) Joey Mawson	(Australia) Joey Mawson	88Racing
4	R1	(New South Wales) Sydney Motorsports Park	(Australia) Aaron Cameron	(Australia) Jordan Boys	(Australia) Aaron Cameron	Garry Rogers Motorsport
4	R2	(New South Wales) Sydney Motorsports Park		(Australia) Aaron Love	(Australia) Aaron Cameron	Garry Rogers Motorsport
4	R3	(New South Wales) Sydney Motorsports Park		(Australia) Aaron Love	(Australia) Aaron Cameron	Garry Rogers Motorsport
5	R1	(South Australia) The Bend Motorsports Park	(Australia) Aaron Cameron	(Australia) Cooper Webster	(Australia) Cooper Webster	Versa Motorsport
5	R2	(South Australia) The Bend Motorsports Park		(Australia) Cooper Webster	(Australia) Cooper Webster	Versa Motorsport
5	R3	(South Australia) The Bend Motorsports Park		(Australia) Aaron Cameron	(Australia) Aaron Cameron	Garry Rogers Motorsport
2023 S5000 Tasman Series						
6	R1	(South Australia) Adelaide Street Circuit	(Australia) Aaron Cameron	(Australia) Aaron Cameron	(Australia) Aaron Cameron	Garry Rogers Motorsport
6	R2	(South Australia) Adelaide Street Circuit		(Australia) Aaron Cameron	(Australia) Aaron Cameron	Garry Rogers Motorsport
6	R3	(South Australia) Adelaide Street Circuit		(Australia) Aaron Cameron	(Australia) Aaron Cameron	Garry Rogers Motorsport

== Season report ==
The 2023 season kicked off in late February at Symmons Plains Raceway with 88Racing's defending champion Joey Mawson on pole position. He converted that into the lead of the first race ahead of GRM's Aaron Cameron and Versa's Cooper Webster, and was never challenged by his rivals to take the fastest lap and the race win. This win then handed him pole position for the second race, where he continued his pace right on to take another victory. GRM's James Golding came second, but a penalty demoted him to fourth and allowed Webster and GRM's Roberto Merhi past him. The main event saw the first time Mawson was beaten at the start, but after 14 laps of following Webster, Mawson made a well-timed move into turn six to take the lead and the win, with Golding clinching a podium this time. Mawson left Tasmania unbeaten and with a 29-point lead.

The field then headed north to Phillip Island, and this time it was Webster who claimed pole position. His advantage was short-lived, however, as Mawson took the lead right at the start of the first race and never looked back from then on to take his fourth straight win. Behind the pair, Golding moved past Cameron to complete the podium. The second race saw the battle between Webster and Mawson continue. Webster led from the start until Mawson passed him on a safety car restart but was penalized for his maneuver to hand Webster the win and Golding second. The third race was comparatively calm, with Webster fending off Mawson at the start and showing superior pace from then on to take the win. Golding continued his podium streak in third as Webster diminished Mawson's championship lead.

Round three was held at Winton Motor Raceway, where Golding became the third different polesitter. Mawson once again had the better start to move into the lead, while Golding dropped to fourth. He worked his way back right behind Mawson, with a safety car then setting up a one-lap final. Mawson made a clinical restart to claim the win, while Golding failed to warm up his tires, running off track to hand podium spots to Webster and his teammate Blake Purdie. The second race was also won by Mawson, while his closest challenger Webster had a bad start that resulted in multiple crashes and ended his race. Only five cars took the chequered flag as Golding and Cameron completed the podium. They also did so as Mawson swept the weekend with another win in race three. Webster was able to slightly soften the blow to his title campaign by coming fourth.

Both Webster and Mawson missed the fourth round, with the latter suspended after failing a routine test for supplement use. Cameron continued the streak of non-repeating polemen, but was jumped by Purdie at the start of race one. He made an unsuccessful comeback attempt right after and then waited until lap ten, where he tried again and this time was able to retake the lead. GRM's Jordan Boys came third, before making it one better in race two and claiming second. Cameron was first again, this time undeterred by anyone behind him, and Purdie came third. Race three saw Cameron sweep the weekend, hugely profiting by the absence of Webster and Mawson to put himself level on points with championship leader Mawson. Purdie and Boys again fought out the podium places among themselves, with the former eventually coming out ahead.

The penultimate round at the Bend saw Cameron became the year's first repeat pole position winner. Championship contender Webster returned to the series and was right back at the front, taking away Cameron's lead into turn one starting the first race. He led from then on until the finish, gapping Cameron and Boys by five seconds. His win saw him start from the front for race two, in which the top four cars of Webster, Cameron, Boys and Purdie all held their position throughout the encounter. Webster's pole position for the main event was challenged by 88Racing's Aaron Love, before Cameron slipped past both of them to take the lead. He went on to win the race, while Webster beat Love for second place. Cameron's win allowed him to build a gap of 84 points ahead of Webster, with the still absent Mawson now in third.

The season finale and the 2023 S5000 Tasman Series were held at Adelaide Street Circuit, and Cameron was on pole again. With his sights set on the championship title, he crushed his opposition through the first race to win lights-to-flag ahead of Boys and Purdie. Race two delivered much of the same, although this time Cameron had to defend his lead through two safety car restarts. He did so, leading Boys and Ben Bargwanna, driving for the team of the same name, home. Webster was disqualified post-race, handing Cameron the championship title and bringing Boys right with him in the standings. The final race saw another controlled lights-to-flag effort by Cameron, who therefore became just the third driver to win both the MA Gold Star and the Tasman Cup in the same season. Boys came second, thereby clinching second in the standings.

The season saw two clear halves: defending champion Mawson dominated the first three rounds, winning seven of the nine races. Following his suspension, Cameron did the exact same through the final three rounds. Webster was the clear second fastest through the first half and swept the weekend at the Bend, but missing the round at Sydney and an anonymous final weekend hurt his campaign. This allowed Boys, who steadily improved his pace throughout the season, to narrowly pip him to the runner-up spot.

== Championship standings ==
=== Scoring system ===
At each meeting, a qualifying session and three races were held. Meeting points were awarded to the fastest three qualifiers in qualifying, where the grid for Race 1 was set. For Race 2, the grid was set by the results of Race 1. The grid for the Main Event was defined by the points earned by the drivers across the weekend.

Position	1st	2nd	3rd	4th	5th	6th	7th	8th	9th	10th	11th	12th	13th	14th	15th	Ret
Qualifying	10	5	1	0												0
Race 1 and 2	30	27	24	22	20	18	16	14	12	10	8	6	4	2	1	0
Main event	60	50	40	32	26	24	22	20	18	16	14	12	10	8	6	0

=== Drivers' standings ===
Pos	Driver	SYM (Tasmania)			PHI (Victoria (state))			WIN (Victoria (state))			SYD (New South Wales)			BEN (South Australia)			ADE (South Australia)			Pts
Pos	Driver	R1	R2	R3	R1	R2	R3	R1	R2	R3	R1	R2	R3	R1	R2	R3	R1	R2	R3	Pts
1	(Australia) Aaron Cameron	2	6	4	4	7	4	5^{3}	3	3	**1**^{1}	1	1	**2**^{1}	2	1	**1**^{1}	1	1	616
2	(Australia) Jordan Boys	4	5	7	Ret	6	7	4	4	5	3	2	3	3^{3}	3	4	2^{2}	2	2	458
3	(Australia) Cooper Webster	3	2	2	**2**^{1}	1	1	2	Ret	4				1^{2}	1	2	6	DSQ	5	446
4	(Australia) Joey Mawson	**1**^{1}	1	1	1^{2}	3	2	1^{2}	1	1										364
5	(Australia) Blake Purdie	6	8	6	5	4	5	3	Ret	6	2^{2}	3	2	7	4	6	3^{3}	4	Ret	364
6	(Australia) Nic Carroll	7	7	9	6	5	6	8	5	8	5	6	7	8	7	8	7	7	6	332
7	(Australia) James Golding	5^{2}	4	3	3^{3}	2	3	**7**^{1}	2	2										282
8	(Australia) Ben Bargwanna										4	4	4	6	6	5	4	3	3	224
9	(Australia) Mark Rosser	10	9	10	Ret	8	9	Ret	Ret	9	7	9	9	9	9	9	9	Ret	9	206
10	(Australia) Aaron Love										8^{3}	5	5	4	5	3				143
11	(Australia) Kody Garland										6	7	6	5	8	7				114
12	(Australia) Winston Smith				7	9	8	6	Ret	7										88
13	(Spain) Roberto Merhi	9^{3}	3	5													WD	WD	WD	63
14	(Australia) Sebastian Amadio										Ret	8	8				8	Ret	7	60
15	(Australia) Nathan Herne																Ret	6	4	50
=16	(Australia) Zane Goddard	8	10	8																44
=16	(Australia) Kobi Williams																10	8	8	44
18	(New Zealand) Kaleb Ngatoa																5	5	Ret	40
—	(Australia) Matt McLean	WD	WD	WD																—
Pos	Driver	R1	R2	R3	R1	R2	R3	R1	R2	R3	R1	R2	R3	R1	R2	R3	R1	R2	R3	Pts
Pos	Driver	SYM (Tasmania)			PHI (Victoria (state))			WIN (Victoria (state))			SYD (New South Wales)			BEN (South Australia)			ADE (South Australia)			Pts

Colour	Result
Gold	Winner
Silver	Second place
Bronze	Third place
Green	Points classification
Blue	Non-points classification
Blue	Non-classified finish (NC)
Purple	Retired, not classified (Ret)
Red	Did not qualify (DNQ)
Red	Did not pre-qualify (DNPQ)
Black	Disqualified (DSQ)
White	Did not start (DNS)
White	Withdrew (WD)
White	Race cancelled (C)
Blank	Did not practice (DNP)
Blank	Did not arrive (DNA)
Blank	Excluded (EX)

**Bold** – Pole

Italics – Fastest Lap

^{1 2 3} – R1 qualifying positions awarding extra points

=== Tasman Series standings ===
Pos	Driver	ADE (South Australia)			Pts
Pos	Driver	R1	R2	R3	Pts
1	(Australia) Aaron Cameron	**1**^{1}	1	1	130
2	(Australia) Jordan Boys	2^{2}	2	2	109
3	(Australia) Ben Bargwanna	4	3	3	86
4	(Australia) Nic Carroll	7	7	6	56
5	(Australia) Nathan Herne	Ret	6	4	50
6	(Australia) Blake Purdie	3^{3}	4	Ret	47
7	(Australia) Cooper Webster	6	DSQ	5	44
8	(Australia) Kobi Williams	10	8	8	44
9	(New Zealand) Kaleb Ngatoa	5	5	Ret	40
10	(Australia) Sebastian Amadio	8	Ret	7	36
11	(Australia) Mark Rosser	9	Ret	9	30
Pos	Driver	R1	R2	R3	Pts
Pos	Driver	ADE (South Australia)			Pts
