= Akshay Bohra =

Indian and American racing driver (born 2007)

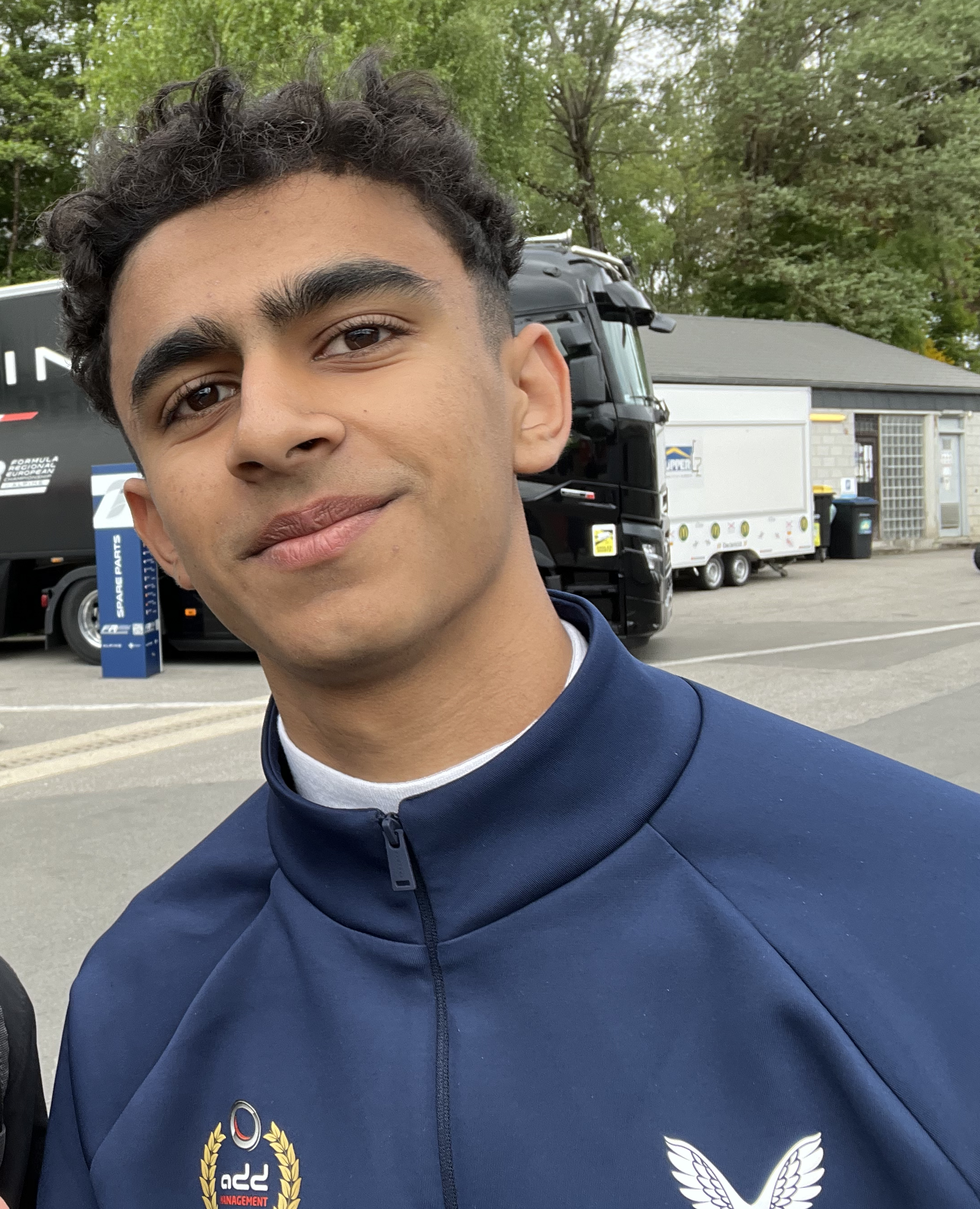
- Bohra in 2025
- Nationality: (India) Indian; (United States) American; via dual nationality
- Born: Akshay Arjun Bohra; February 22, 2007 (age 19) New York City, U.S.
- Relatives: Nikhil Bohra (brother)

Super Formula Lights career
- Debut season: 2026
- Current team: TOM'S
- Car number: 37
- Starts: 18
- Wins: 0
- Podiums: 4
- Poles: 0
- Fastest laps: 0
- Best finish: 6th in 2026

Previous series
- 2025; 2025; 2023–2024; 2023–2024; 2023; 2023; 2023; 2022–2024; 2022: FR European; FR Middle East; Euro 4; Formula Winter Series; F4 Spanish; F4 Indian; F4 UAE; Italian F4; Ginetta Junior

Championship titles
- 2024: Euro 4
- Statistics up to date as of 22 September 2026.

Akshay Arjun Bohra (born February 22, 2007) is an Indian and American racing driver who last competed in the Super Formula Lights for TOM'S.

A protégé of Jordan King, Bohra is a race winner in the Formula Regional European Championship and previously competed in the 2024 Italian F4 Championship, placing fourth overall. He is also the 2024 Euro 4 champion. He is the younger brother of Nikhil Bohra, who is also a racing driver.

== Career ==
=== Karting ===
Bohra began competing in international karting in 2017, racing in the Mini ROK and 60 Mini categories. In 2018, he finished third at the ROK Cup International Final in the Mini ROK category.

In 2019, Bohra started the season in 60 Mini and finished fifth in the WSK series in the Mini category before moving up to Junior competition later in the year. He went on to race in OK Junior and X30 Junior events across Europe and Asia, and won X30 SEA Round 2 in the Junior category at Bira International Circuit in Thailand. He also competed in the IAME Asia Final, where he placed third in the Junior class. He won the IAME Asia Cup in the Junior category in 2020.

In 2021, Bohra won the German Junior Kart Championship in OK Junior. During the season, he also finished fifth in the WSK series in the Junior category and competed in the FIA Karting European Championship and FIA Karting World Championship.

=== Formula 4 ===
==== 2022 ====
Bohra raced in the 2022 Ginetta Junior Championship, finishing 30th in the standings, lowest of all drivers. That year, Bohra made his Formula 4 debut in the Italian F4 Championship with US Racing during the final round in Mugello.

==== 2023 ====
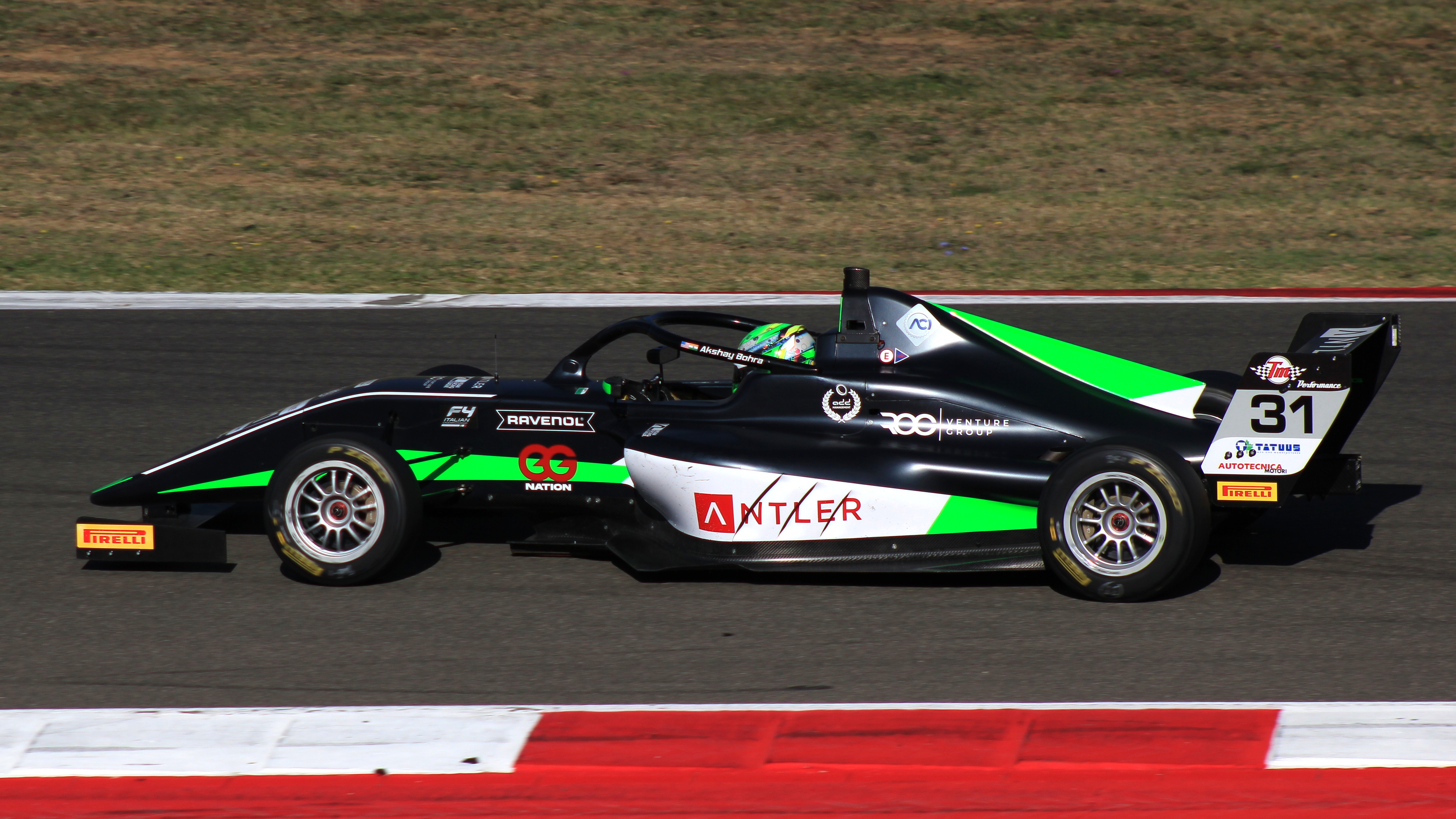
Bohra driving at the Mugello Circuit during the 2023 Italian F4 Championship

Bohra joined PHM Racing to race in the 2023 Formula 4 UAE Championship. Scoring three points finishes that season, with the highest being a seventh place, he was ranked 21st in the standings with eleven points.

Bohra's main campaign lied in the Italian F4 Championship with US Racing. Scoring consistently through the first half of the season, his first podium came during the final race in Monza. Scoring another third-placed podium in Mugello, Bohra eventually placed eighth in the standings with 113 points. In the Euro 4 Championship, Bohra scored a double podium in Mugello, but had his big break by winning his first F4 race in Barcelona after original winner James Wharton was penalised. This allowed him to finish third in the overall standings.

Bohra also took part in the F4 Indian Championship that year, placing third in the standings. He also made a cameo appearance in the F4 Spanish Championship with MP Motorsport, driving for them during the season finale in Barcelona.

==== 2024 ====
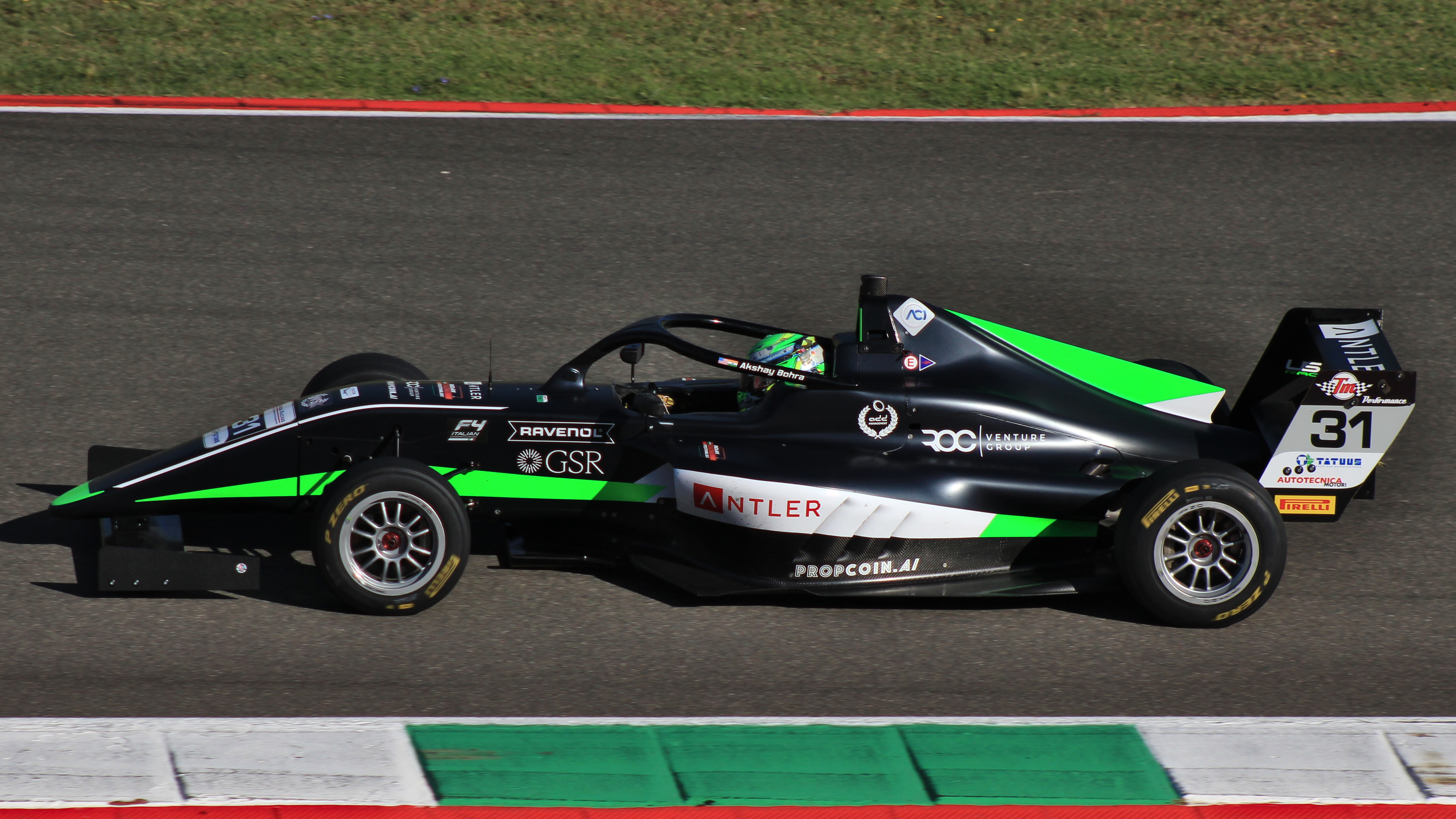
Bohra driving at the Mugello Circuit during the 2024 Italian F4 Championship

During pre-season, Bohra took part in the Formula Winter Series, finishing 11th in the overall standings.

Bohra's main campaign again lied in the Italian F4 Championship where he continued to drive for US Racing. He had a stronger start to the season, scoring three podiums in the opening two rounds, before a first pole came for the first race in Mugello. His first and only win came in the first race in Paul Ricard, leading a lights-to-flag victory. Scoring two more third-place podiums after that, Bohra finished fourth in the standings, having amassed one win and eight total podiums.

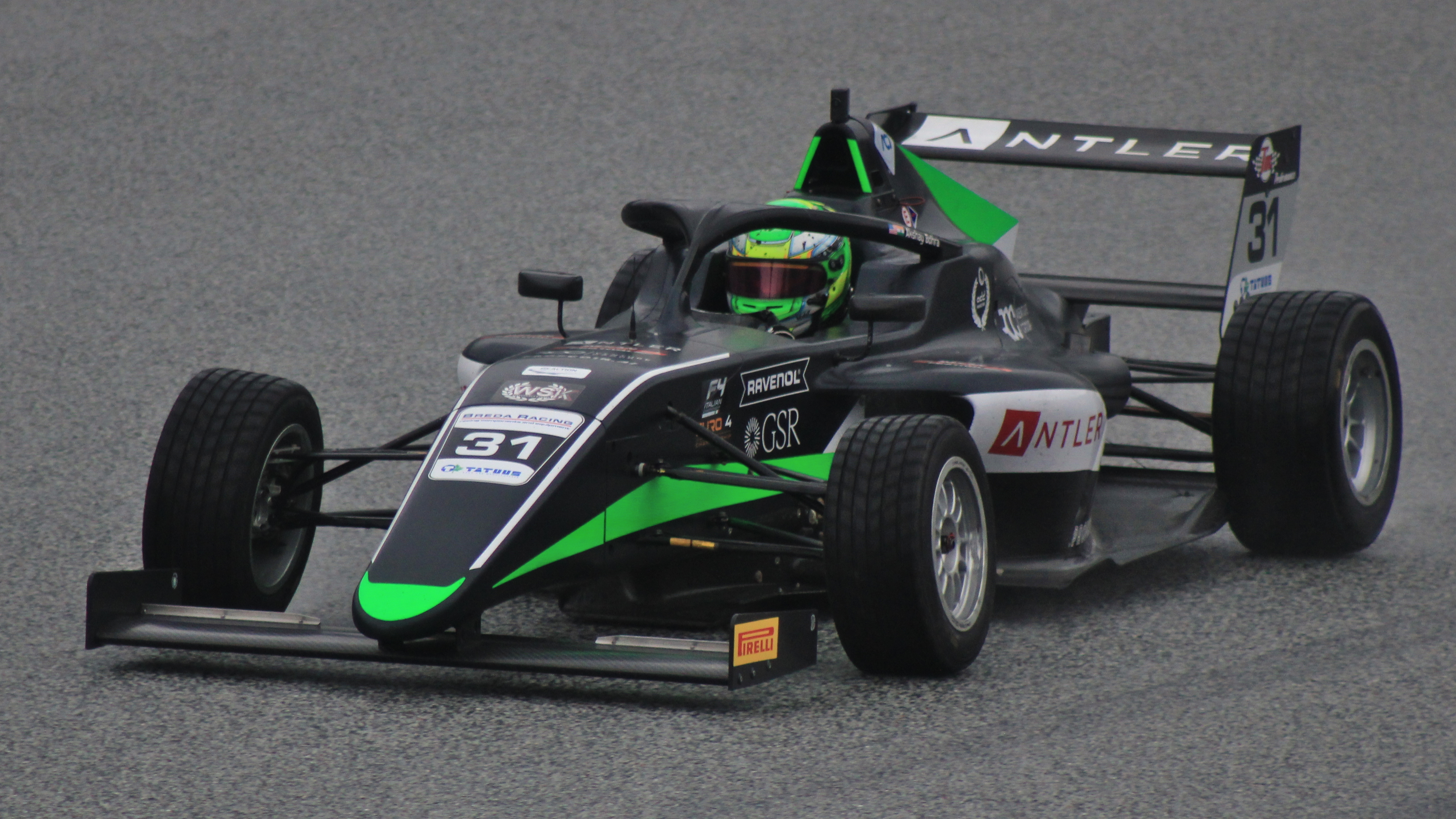
Bohra driving at the Red Bull Ring during the 2024 Euro 4 Championship

In the Euro 4 Championship, Bohra began the campaign with a double victory in Mugello. A difficult qualifying came at the Red Bull Ring where he was forced to make comebacks, rewarded with two fourth-place finishes. Despite two runner-up finishes during the last round in Monza, standings leader Freddie Slater experienced a troubling weekend, allowing Bohra to overhaul him and clinch the Euro 4 title.

=== Formula Regional ===
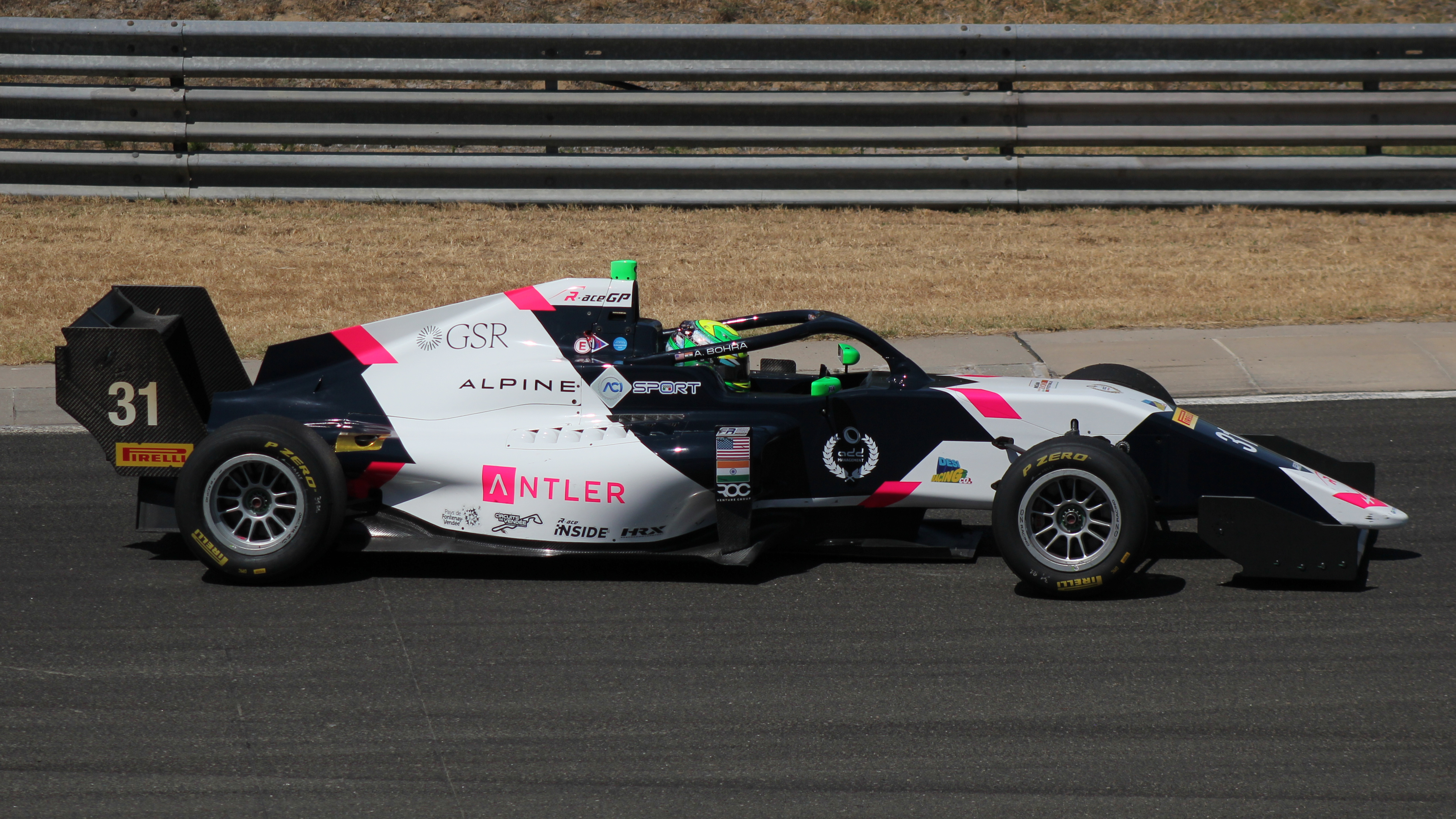
Bohra driving at the Hungaroring during the 2025 Formula Regional European Championship

Bohra competed in the Formula Regional Middle East Championship with R-ace GP. For his main campaign, Bohra remained with R-ace GP to compete in the Formula Regional European Championship.

=== Super Formula Lights ===
Bohra switched to Super Formula Lights for the 2026 season, joining TOM'S.

== Personal life ==
Bohra's older brother, Nikhil is also a racing driver who last competed in the Formula Regional European Championship with MP Motorsport.

== Karting record ==
=== Karting career summary ===
Season	Series	Team	Position
2017	ROK Cup International Final — Mini ROK	Gamoto ASD	22nd
2017	Trofeo Delle Industrie — 60 Mini	Gamoto ASD	9th
2017	WSK Final Cup — 60 Mini	Gamoto ASD	26th
2018	South Garda Winter Cup — Mini ROK	Parolin Racing Kart	23rd
2018	WSK Champions Cup — 60 Mini	Parolin Racing Kart	11th
2018	WSK Master Series — 60 Mini	Parolin Racing Kart	18th
2018	ROK Cup International Final — Mini ROK	Parolin Racing Kart	3rd
2018	WSK Final Cup — 60 Mini	Parolin Racing Kart	25th
2019	South Garda Winter Cup — Mini ROK	KR Motorsport	9th
2019	WSK Open Cup - OKJ	KR Motorsport	35th
2019	WSK Champions Cup — 60 Mini	KR Motorsport	12th
2019	WSK Super Master Series — 60 Mini	KR Motorsport	5th
2019	WSK Euro Series — OKJ	KR Motorsport	13th
2019	CIK-FIA European Championship — OKJ	KR Motorsport	
2019	IAME International Final — X30 Junior		
2019	IAME Series Asia – Junior	I.S Racing	6th
2019	IAME Asia Cup – Cadet	I.S Racing	5th
2019	IAME Asia Final — Junior	I.S Racing	3rd
2019	Trofeo Delle Industrie — OKJ		23rd
2020	South Garda Winter Cup — OKJ	TB Racing Team	5th
2020	WSK Super Master Series — OKJ	TB Racing Team	30th
2020	IAME Asia Cup — Junior	I.S Racing	1st
2021	WSK Champions Cup — OKJ	KR Motorsport	21st
2021	WSK Super Master Series — OKJ	KR Motorsport	5th
2021	WSK Euro Series — OKJ	KR Motorsport	22nd
2021	WSK Open Cup — OKJ	KR Motorsport	19th
2021	CIK-FIA European Championship — OKJ	KR Motorsport	7th
2021	WSK Final Cup — OK	KR Motorsport	21st
2021	German Junior Kart Championship — OKJ	TB Racing Team	1st
2021	Champions of the Future — OKJ		12th
2022	CIK-FIA European Championship — OK	KR Motorsport	45th

=== Complete Macao International Kart Grand Prix results ===
Year	Series	Team	Class	Pre-Final	Final
2016	Asian Karting Open Championship	IS Racing Team	Formula SQ Cadet	?	3rd
2016	Asian Karting Open Championship	IS Racing Team	Mini ROK	?	?
2017	Asian Karting Open Championship	IS Racing Team	Mini ROK	2nd	6th
2018	Asian Karting Open Championship	IS Racing Team	Mini ROK	?	5th
2019	Asian Karting Open Championship	IS Racing Team	Formula 125 Junior Open	1st	3rd

== Racing record ==
=== Racing career summary ===
Season	Series	Team	Races	Wins	Poles	F/Laps	Podiums	Points	Position
2022	Ginetta Junior Championship	R Racing	13	0	0	0	0	-12	30th
2022	Italian F4 Championship	US Racing	3	0	0	0	0	0	36th
2023	Formula 4 UAE Championship	PHM Racing	15	0	0	0	0	11	21st
2023	Formula Winter Series	US Racing	2	0	0	0	1	28	9th
2023	Italian F4 Championship	US Racing	21	0	0	0	2	113	8th
2023	Euro 4 Championship	US Racing	9	1	2	1	4	145	**3rd**
2023	F4 Indian Championship	Godspeed Kochi	15	1	3	3	11	211	**3rd**
2023	F4 Spanish Championship	MP Motorsport	3	0	0	0	0	0	NC†
2024	Formula Winter Series	US Racing	11	0	0	0	0	49	11th
2024	Italian F4 Championship	US Racing	21	1	4	2	8	217	4th
2024	Euro 4 Championship	US Racing	9	2	3	1	4	124	**1st**
2025	Formula Regional Middle East Championship	R-ace GP	15	1	0	1	1	48	14th
2025	Formula Regional European Championship	R-ace GP	20	1	1	1	6	159	6th
2025	Indian Racing League	Hyderabad Blackbirds	1	0	0	0	1	61	6th
2026	Super Formula Lights	TOM'S	18	0	0	0	4	33.5	6th

=== Complete Ginetta Junior Championship results ===
(key) (Races in bold indicate pole position) (Races in italics indicate fastest lap)

Year	Team	1	2	3	4	5	6	7	8	9	10	11	12	13	14	15	16	17	18	19	20	21	22	23	24	25	DC	Points
2022	R Racing	DON; 1; 18	DON; 2; 12	DON; 3 Ret	BHI; 1; 13	BHI; 2; 18	BHI; 3; 15	THR1; 1; 11	THR1; 2; 17	CRO; 1; 9	CRO; 2; 10	KNO; 1	KNO; 2	KNO; 3	SNE; 1	SNE; 2	SNE; 3	THR2; 1; 13	THR2; 2; 14	THR2; 3; 14	SIL; 1 WD	SIL; 2 WD	SIL; 3 WD	BHGP; 1	BHGP; 2	BHGP; 3	30th	-12

=== Complete Italian F4 Championship results ===
(key) (Races in bold indicate pole position) (Races in italics indicate fastest lap)

Year	Team	1	2	3	4	5	6	7	8	9	10	11	12	13	14	15	16	18	19	20	21	22	23	DC	Points
2022	US Racing	IMO; 1	IMO; 2	IMO; 3	MIS; 1	MIS; 2	MIS; 3	SPA; 1	SPA; 2	SPA; 3	VLL; 1	VLL; 2	VLL; 3	RBR; 1	RBR; 2	RBR; 3	RBR; 4	MNZ; 1	MNZ; 2	MNZ; 3	MUG; 1; 13	MUG; 2 Ret	MUG; 3; 13	36th	0
2023	US Racing	IMO; 1; 4	IMO; 2; 19	IMO; 3	IMO; 4; 7	MIS; 1 Ret	MIS; 2; 7	MIS; 3; 10	SPA; 1; 8	SPA; 2; 4	SPA; 3; 6	MNZ; 1; 7	MNZ; 2; 26†	MNZ; 3; 3	LEC; 1 Ret	LEC; 2; 6	LEC; 3; 12	MUG; 1; 6	MUG; 2; 3	MUG; 3; 4	VLL; 1 Ret	VLL; 2 Ret	VLL; 3; 7	8th	113
2024	US Racing	MIS; 1; 4	MIS; 2; 3	MIS; 3; 16	IMO; 1; 2	IMO; 2; 2	IMO; 3; 5	VLL; 1; 7	VLL; 2; 7	VLL; 3; 6	**MUG**; **1**; 3	MUG; 2; 2	MUG; 3; 6	**LEC**; **1**; 1	**LEC**; **2**; 3	LEC; 3; 25	**CAT**; **1** Ret	CAT; 2; 3	CAT; 3 Ret	MNZ; 1; 4	MNZ; 2; 4	MNZ; 3; 5		4th	217

=== Complete Formula 4 UAE Championship results ===
(key) (Races in bold indicate pole position) (Races in italics indicate fastest lap)

Year	Team	1	2	3	4	5	6	7	8	9	10	11	12	13	14	15	DC	Points
2023	PHM Racing	DUB1; 1; 12	DUB1; 2; 13	DUB1; 3; 22	KMT1; 1; 31	KMT1; 2; 12	KMT1; 3; 14	KMT2; 1; 12	KMT2; 2; 35†	KMT2; 3; 10	DUB2; 1; 28	DUB2; 2; 18	DUB2; 3; 7	YMC; 1; 15	YMC; 2; 8	YMC; 3; 12	21st	11

=== Complete Formula Winter Series results ===
(key) (Races in bold indicate pole position; races in italics indicate fastest lap)

Year	Team	1	2	3	4	5	6	7	8	9	10	11	DC	Points
2023	US Racing	JER; 1	JER; 2	CRT; 1	CRT; 2	NAV; 1	NAV; 2	CAT; 2; 5	CAT; 2; 2				9th	28
2024	US Racing	JER; 1; 5	JER; 2; 7	JER; 3; 10	CRT; 1; 5	CRT; 2; 5	CRT; 3; 4	ARA; 1; 32	ARA; 2; 32	CAT; 1 C	CAT; 2; 19	CAT; 3; 13	11th	49

=== Complete Euro 4 Championship results ===
(key) (Races in bold indicate pole position; races in italics indicate fastest lap)

Year	Team	1	2	3	4	5	6	7	8	9	DC	Points
2023	US Racing	MUG; 1; 3	MUG; 2; 2	MUG; 3; 6	MNZ; 1; 5	MNZ; 2; 5	MNZ; 3; 3	**CAT**; **1**; 1	**CAT**; **2**; 6	CAT; 3; 8	3rd	145
2024	US Racing	**MUG**; **1**; 1	**MUG**; **2**; 8	**MUG**; **3**; 1	RBR; 1; 4	RBR; 2; 12	RBR; 3; 4	MNZ; 1; 2	MNZ; 2; 2	MNZ; 3; 5	1st	124

=== Complete F4 Indian Championship results ===
(key) (Races in bold indicate pole position) (Races in italics indicate fastest lap)

Year	Entrant	1	2	3	4	5	6	7	8	9	10	11	12	13	14	15	Pos	Points
2023	Godspeed Kochi	**MIC1**; **1**; 1	MIC1; 2; 2	**MIC1**; **3**; 7	MIC2; 1; 3	MIC2; 2; 4	**MIC2**; **3**; 2	MIC3; 1; 3	MIC3; 2; 3	MIC3; 3; 2	MIC3; 4; 3	MIC3; 5; 3	MIC4; 1; 2	MIC4; 2 Ret	MIC4; 3; 2	MIC4; 4; 4	3rd	211

=== Complete F4 Spanish Championship results ===
(key) (Races in bold indicate pole position) (Races in italics indicate fastest lap)

Year	Team	1	2	3	4	5	6	7	8	9	10	11	12	13	14	15	16	17	18	19	20	21	DC	Points
2023	MP Motorsport	SPA; 1	SPA; 2	SPA; 3	ARA; 1	ARA; 2	ARA; 3	NAV; 1	NAV; 2	NAV; 3	JER; 1	JER; 2	JER; 3	EST; 1	EST; 2	EST; 3	CRT; 1	CRT; 2	CRT; 3	CAT; 1; 21	CAT; 2; 15	CAT; 3; 12	NC†	0

^{†} As Bohra was a guest driver, he was ineligible to score points.

=== Complete Formula Regional Middle East Championship results ===
(key) (Races in bold indicate pole position) (Races in italics indicate fastest lap)

Year	Entrant	1	2	3	4	5	6	7	8	9	10	11	12	13	14	15	DC	Points
2025	R-ace GP	YMC1; 1; 15	YMC1; 2 Ret	YMC1; 3 Ret	YMC2; 1; 16	YMC2; 2; 14	YMC2; 3; 10	DUB; 1; 11	DUB; 2; 6	DUB; 3; 18	YMC3; 1; 10	YMC3; 2; 1	YMC3; 3; 22	LUS; 1; 13	LUS; 2; 14	LUS; 3; 17	14th	48

=== Complete Formula Regional European Championship results ===
(key) (Races in bold indicate pole position) (Races in italics indicate fastest lap)

Year	Team	1	2	3	4	5	6	7	8	9	10	11	12	13	14	15	16	17	18	19	20	DC	Points
2025	R-ace GP	MIS; 1; 9	MIS; 2; 14	SPA; 1; 7	SPA; 2; 15	ZAN; 1; 3	ZAN; 2; 9	HUN; 1; 8	HUN; 2; 4	LEC; 1; 4	LEC; 2; 3	IMO; 1; 3	**IMO**; **2**; 1	RBR; 1; 5	RBR; 2; 12	CAT; 1; 12	CAT; 2; 3	HOC; 1; 2	HOC; 2; 8	MNZ; 1 Ret	MNZ; 2; 10	6th	159

=== Complete Super Formula Lights results ===
(key) (Races in bold indicate pole position) (Races in italics indicate fastest lap)

Year	Entrant	1	2	3	4	5	6	7	8	9	10	11	12	13	14	15	16	17	18	Pos	Points
2026	TOM'S	FUJ; 1; 8	FUJ; 2; 7	FUJ; 3; 10	AUT; 1; 7	AUT; 2 Ret	AUT; 3; 6	SUZ; 1; 4	SUZ; 2; 10	SUZ; 3; 2	OKA; 1; 6	OKA; 2; 7	OKA; 3; 10	SUG; 1; 6	SUG; 2; 2	SUG; 3; 4	MOT; 1; 2	MOT; 2 Ret	MOT; 3; 3	6th	33.5
