= Godspeed Kochi =

Indian racing team

(India) Godspeed Kochi
- Founded: 2022
- Base: Kochi, Kerala
- Current series: F4 Indian Championship
- Former series: Indian Racing League
- Current drivers: F4 India (Australia) Zakariya Mohammed (South Africa) Wian Boshoff (Australia) Aris Kyriakou; Ethan Joy

Godspeed Kochi is an Indian motorsport franchise that competes in the F4 Indian Championship also previously in the Indian Racing League.

== History ==
The franchise was founded in 2022, headed up by Thiruvananthapuram-based businessman and former rally driver Joseph Thomas Pottamkulam, as a last-minute entry into the Indian Racing League. Local drivers Ruhaan Alva and Nikhil Bohra were set to be joined by British GT4 driver Jordan Albert and Brazilian F4 driver Aurelia Nobels, however Nobels was unable to obtain a visa and was replaced with W Series driver Fabienne Wohlwend. Albert left the series after the first round in Hyderabad was cancelled, with Pottamkulam claiming he "ran away", and was replaced with Alister Yoong. At least one of the teams' cars scored a podium finish in all but one of the races that season, including the Yoong/Bohra combination winning all three races in the final weekend of the season, on their way to the teams' championship whilst all four drivers finished inside the top six in the championship.

The four drivers who completed the 2022 IRL season were retained for 2023, whilst the franchise expanded into the new F4 Indian Championship for its inaugural season. The IRL championship format changed to place emphasis on the results of driver combinations over individual achievements, but despite claiming half of the available race wins Kochi were relegated to 3rd behind franchises representing Bangalore and Goa. Bohra's younger brother Akshay was joined by Salva Marjan for the F4 program, however Marjan failed to qualify for the opening round and his replacement Veer Rajwade withdrew from the second, leading to Singaporean Nooris Gafoor moving across from Bangalore for the final two rounds – with all events held at Madras International Circuit, Bohra finished third in the drivers' championship having won the first race of the season.

The franchise exited the Indian Racing League in 2024 and is now operated by RRPL in the F4 Indian Championship

== Results ==
=== Indian Racing League ===
==== Drivers / Entrants championship ====
(key)

Year	Entry	Drivers	1	2	3	4	5	6	7	8	9	10	11	12	Pos.	Pts
2022			HYD1; R1	HYD1; R2	HYD1; R3	IRU1; R1	IRU1; R2	IRU1; R3	IRU2; R1	IRU2; R2	IRU2; R3	HYD2; R1	HYD2; R2	HYD2; R3		
2022	Godspeed Kochi (#2)	(Malaysia) Alister Yoong				2		Ret	1		4	1	P	1	3rd	131.5
2022	Godspeed Kochi (#2)	(United States) Nikhil Bohra	C	C	C		Ret	Ret	P	3	4	P	1	1	4th	118
2022	Godspeed Kochi (#1)	(India) Ruhaan Alva	C	C	C	4		2	6		5		2	6	5th	106
2022	Godspeed Kochi (#1)	(Liechtenstein) Fabienne Wohlwend	C	C	C		2	2		9	5	Ret		6	6th	92
2022	Godspeed Kochi (#2)	(United Kingdom) Jordan Albert	C	C	C										NC	—
2023			IRU1; R1	IRU1; R2	IRU2; R1	IRU2; R2	IRU3; R1	IRU3; R2								
2023	Godspeed Kochi #2	(United States) Nikhil Bohra		4		1	1								3rd	79
2023	Godspeed Kochi #2	(Malaysia) Alister Yoong	Ret		8			4							3rd	79
2023	Godspeed Kochi #5	(India) Ruhaan Alva	1			9	Ret								9th	28
2023	Godspeed Kochi #5	(Liechtenstein) Fabienne Wohlwend		Ret	Ret			Ret							9th	28

==== Teams championship ====
(key)

Year	Entry	No.	1	2	3	4	5	6	7	8	9	10	11	12	Pos.	Pts
2022			HYD1; R1	HYD1; R2	HYD1; R3	IRU1; R1	IRU1; R2	IRU1; R3	IRU2; R1	IRU2; R2	IRU2; R3	HYD2; R1	HYD2; R2	HYD2; R3		
2022	Godspeed Kochi	#1	C	C	C	4	2	2	6	9	5	Ret	2	6	1st	445.5
2022	Godspeed Kochi	#2	C	C	C	2	Ret	Ret	1	3	4	1	1	1	1st	445.5
2023			IRU1; R1	IRU1; R2	IRU2; R1	IRU2; R2	IRU3; R1	IRU3; R2								
2023	Godspeed Kochi	#2	Ret	4	8	1	1	4							3rd	107
2023	Godspeed Kochi	#5	1	Ret	Ret	9	Ret	Ret							3rd	107

=== F4 Indian Championship ===
(key)

Year	Entry	Drivers	1	2	3	4	5	6	7	8	9	10	11	12	13	14	15	Pos.	Pts
2023			IRU1; R1	IRU1; R2	IRU1; R3	IRU2; R1	IRU2; R2	IRU2; R3	IRU3; R1	IRU3; R2	IRU3; R3	IRU3; R4	IRU3; R5	IRU4; R1	IRU4; R2	IRU4; R3	IRU4; R4		
2023	Godspeed Kochi (#31)	(United States) Akshay Bohra	1	2	7	3	4	2	3	3	2	3	3	2	Ret	2	4	3rd	211
2023	Godspeed Kochi (#97, #28)	(Singapore) Nooris Gafoor	different team						8	7	8	8	7	9	7	10	9	9th	57
2023	Godspeed Kochi (#97, #28)	(India) Veer Rajwade				WD	WD	WD						different team				12th	2
2023	Godspeed Kochi (#97, #28)	(India) Salva Marjan	DNQ	DNQ	DNQ													NC	–
2024			IRU1; R1	IRU1; R2	IRU1; R3	IGR; R1	IGR; R2	IRU2; R1	IRU2; R2	IRU2; R3	IRU2; R4	COI1; R1	COI1; R2	COI1; R3	COI2; R1	COI2; R2	COI2; R3		
2024	Godspeed Kochi (#68, #21, #64)	(Australia) Hugh Barter	Ret	1	1	1	5											5th	95
2024	Godspeed Kochi (#68, #21, #64)	(India) Raiden Samervel						different team				Ret	8	7	different team				
2024	Godspeed Kochi (#73, #34)	(Switzerland) Giancarlo Artho	different team			7	10	Ret	11	Ret	7	9	12	10	8	Ret	Ret	15th	20
2024	Godspeed Kochi (#68, #21, #64)	(India) Akhil Agarwal						8	8	9	8				12	12	9	16th	16
2024	Godspeed Kochi (#73, #34)	(India) Aditya Patnaik	14	Ret	DNS													27th	0
