= 2023 Touring Car Masters =

Australian motor racing series

The 2023 Touring Car Masters was an Australian motor racing series for modified Touring Cars manufactured between 01 January 1963 and 31 December 1980, as approved by Motorsport Australia.

The series was won by Steven Johnson driving a Ford Mustang.

== Entries ==
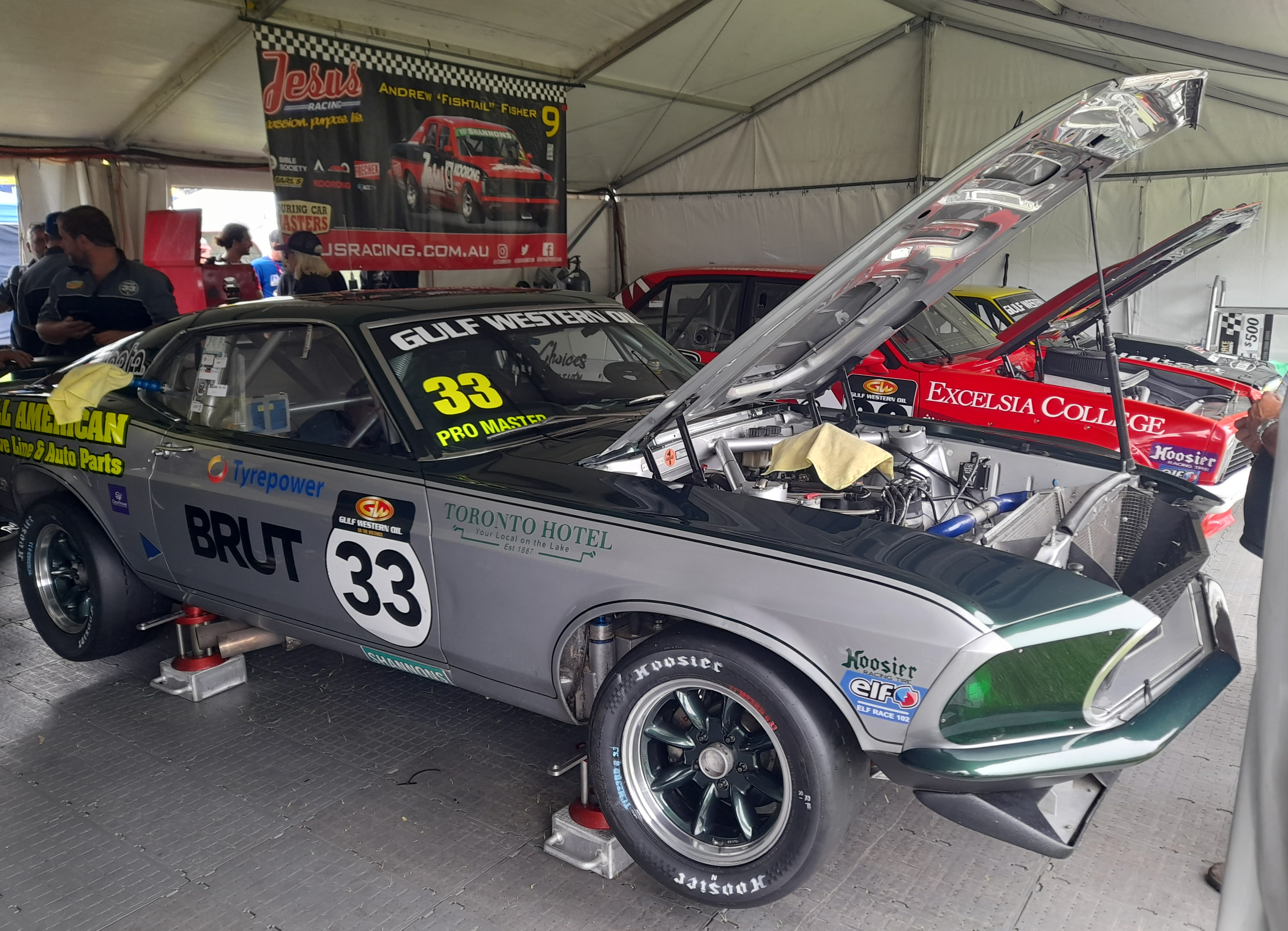
Steven Johnson won the series driving a 1969 Ford Mustang

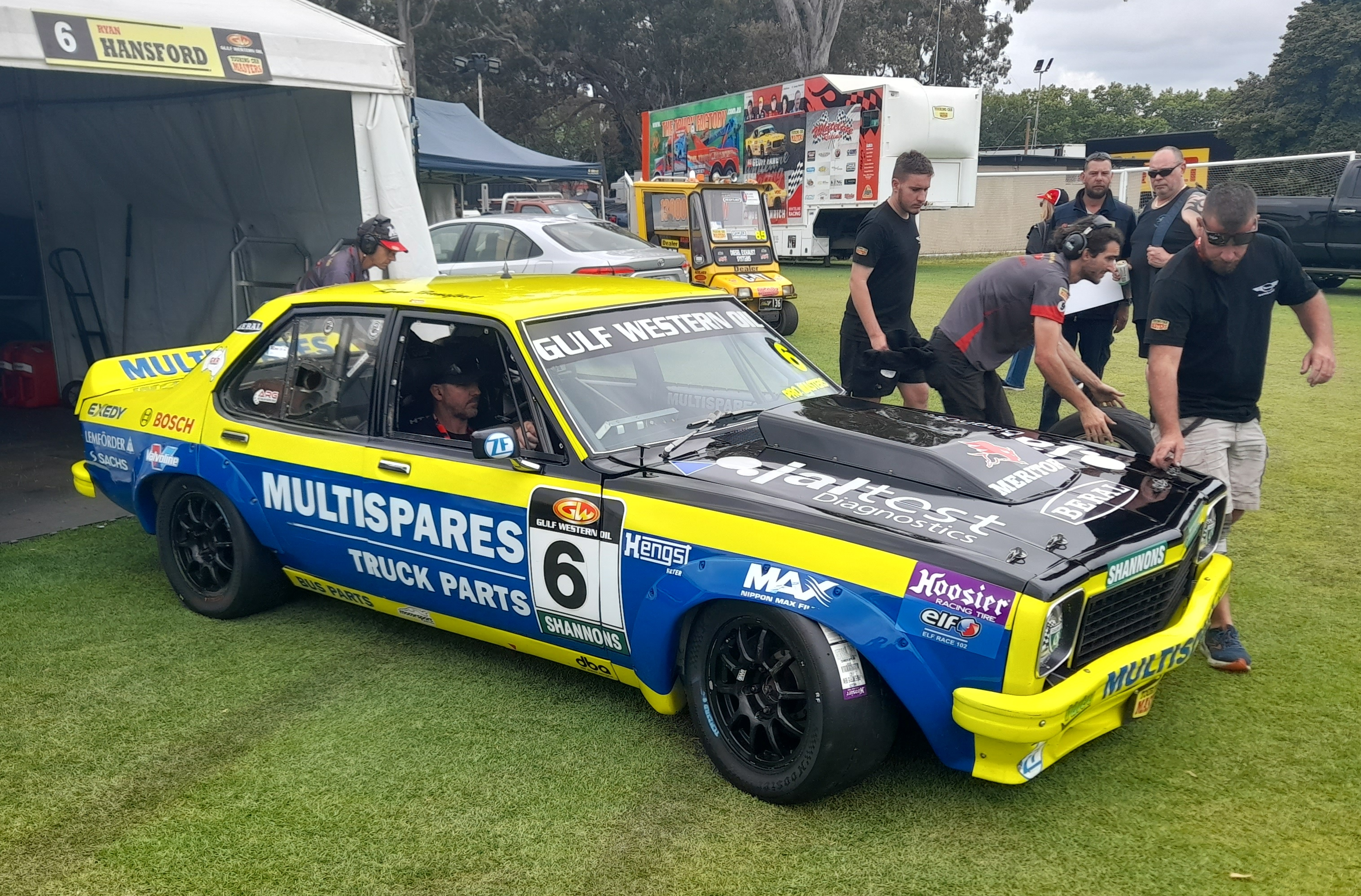
Ryan Hansford placed second driving a Holden Torana SL/R 5000 A9X

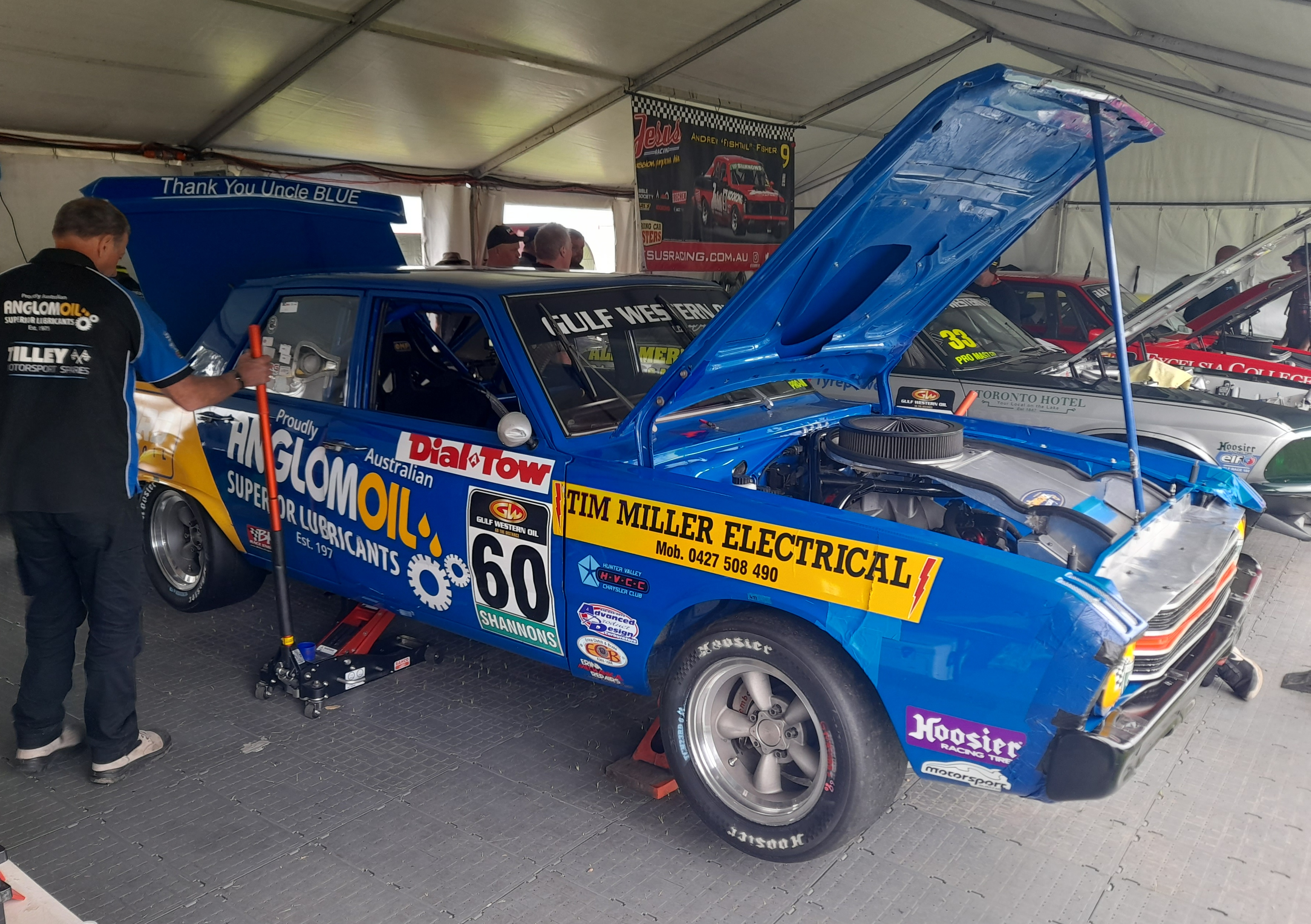
Cameron Tilley placed third driving a Chrysler Valiant Pacer (VF)

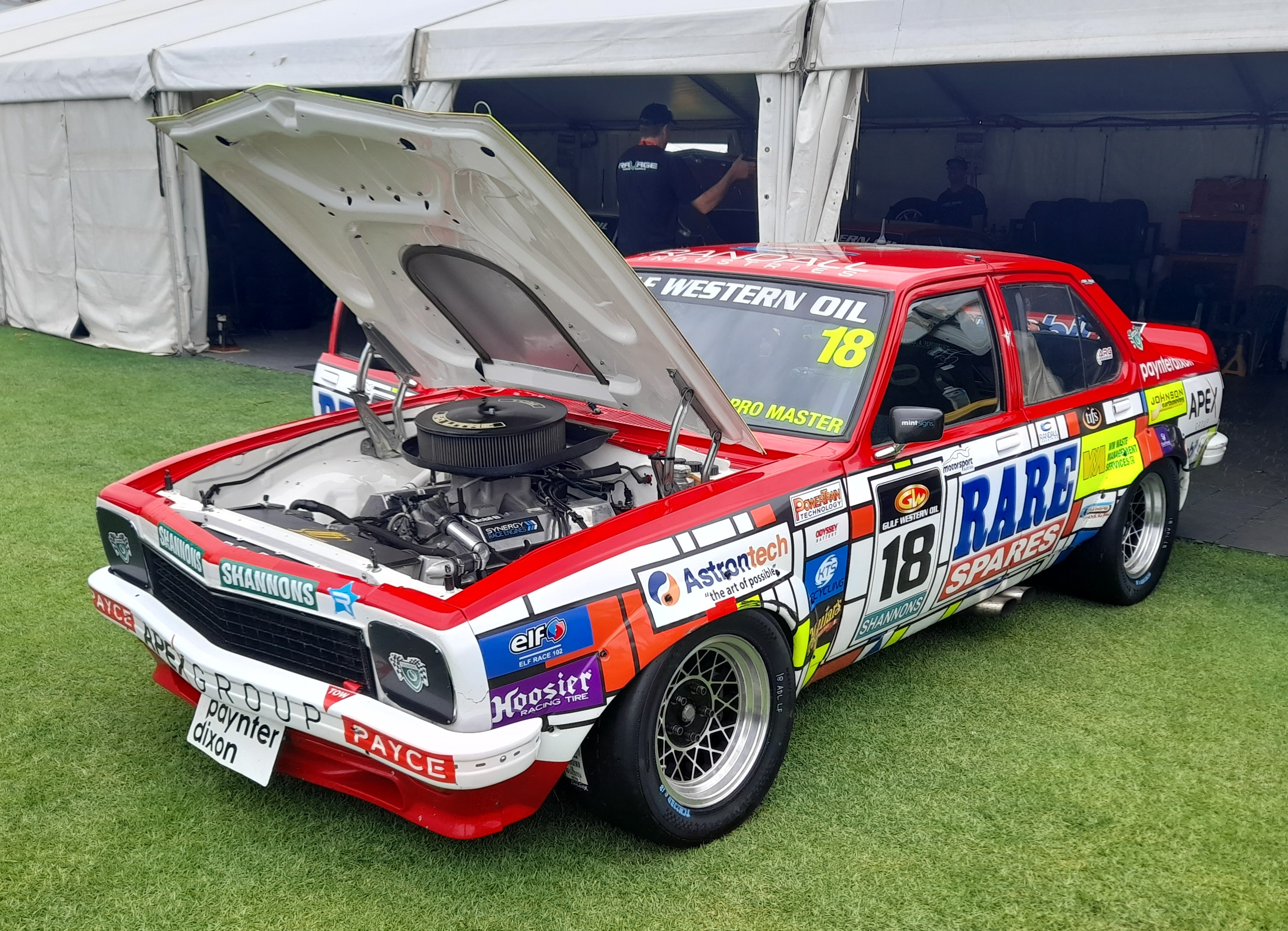
John Bowe placed sixth driving a Holden Torana SL/R 5000

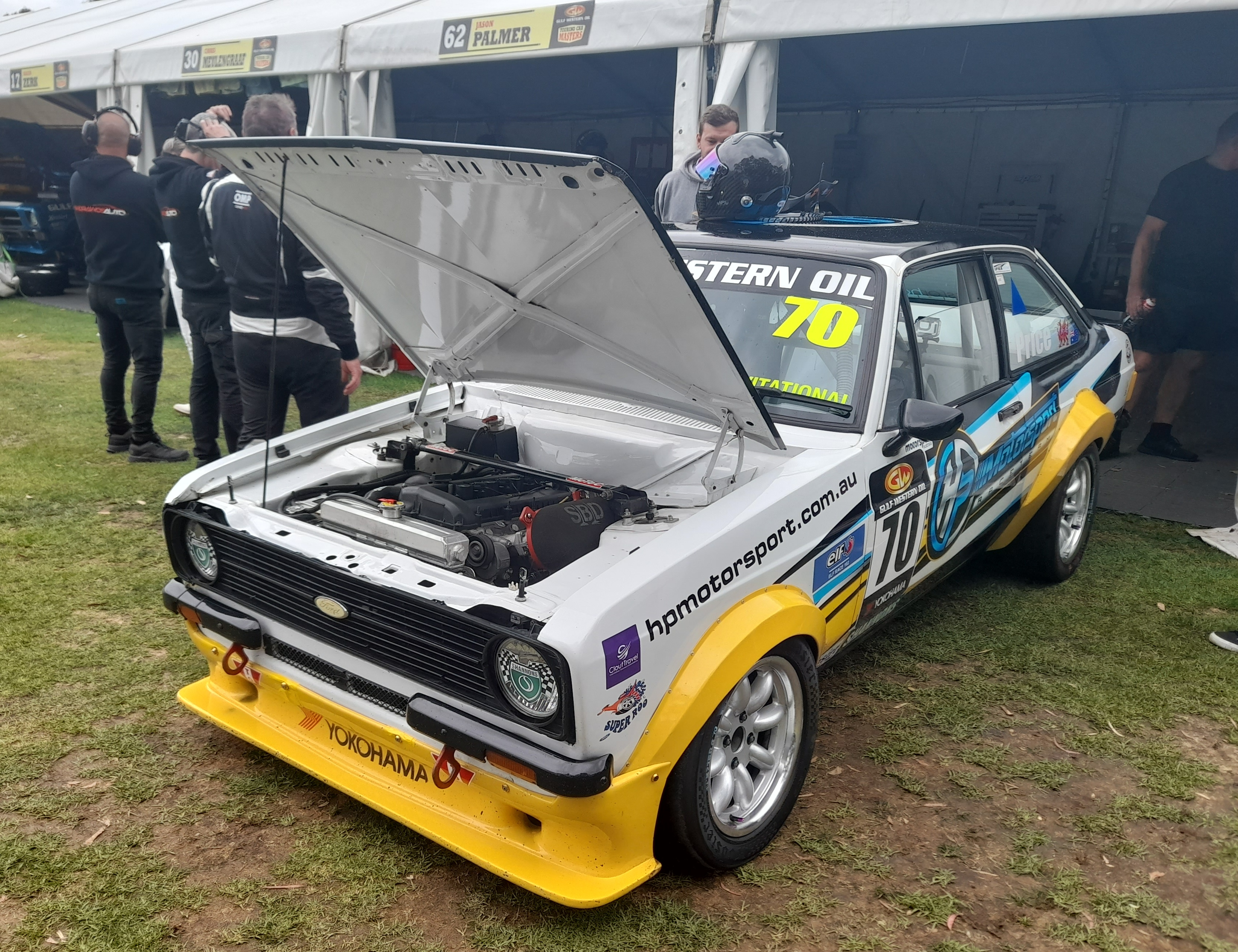
Ian Price placed 20th driving a Ford Escort Mark II

Manufacturer	Model	Entrant	No.	Driver	Class	Rounds
BMW	E30 M3	Palmers Sales and Marketing	62	(Australia) Jason Palmer	I	4, 6
Chevrolet	Camaro SS	Whiteline Racing	95	(Australia) Adam Bressington	PM	2–3
Chevrolet	Camaro SS	Whiteline Racing	95	(Australia) Joel Heinrich	PM	4, 6
Chevrolet	Camaro RS	Whiteline Racing	85	(Australia) Geoff Fane	PA	2–4, 6
Chevrolet	Camaro RS	Life Sciences NZ	104	(New Zealand) Colin Meadows	I	5–6
Chevrolet	Monza	Ben Dunn Racing	99	(Australia) Ben Dunn	PA	5–6
Chrysler	Valiant Charger	Tony Galbraith Racing	143	(New Zealand) Tony Galbraith	I	5–6
Chrysler	Valiant Pacer	Cameron Tilley Racing	60	(Australia) Cameron Tilley	PA	All
Ford	Escort Mk2	High Performance Motorsport	70	(Australia) Ian Price	I	2–3, 6
Ford	XA Falcon GT Hardtop	Hagen Zerk Racing	17	(Australia) Hagen Zerk	I	6
Ford	XA Falcon GT Hardtop	Hagen Zerk Racing	70	(Australia) Hagen Zerk	I	4
Ford	XD Falcon	R&J Batteries Racing	71	(Australia) Marcus Zukanovic	PM	All
Ford	XE Falcon	NZTCM	117	(New Zealand) Tim Dawson	I	5–6
Ford	XY Falcon GT	Bullet Trailers Racing	55	(Australia) John Adams	PS	2–6
Ford	XY Falcon GTHO	Dave Hender Racing	53	(Australia) Dave Hender	PS	3–5
Ford	XY Falcon GTHO	NZTCM	110	(New Zealand) Sean McCaughan	I	5–6
Ford	Mustang GT350	Crew 32	321	(New Zealand) Craig Buchanan	I	5
Ford	Mustang	Jamie Tilley Racing	28	(Australia) Jamie Tilley	PA	5
Ford	Mustang	Jamie Tilley Racing	29	(Australia) Jamie Tilley	PA	2
Ford	Mustang	Hancock Racing	33	(Australia) Steven Johnson	PM	All
Ford	Mustang	TIFS Third Party Logistics	88	(Australia) Tony Karanfilovski	PA	2–6
Holden	HQ Monaro	SNB Berryman Racing	77	(Australia) Warren Trewin	PS	2–6
Holden	Torana A9X	Western General Body Works	3	(Australia) Danny Buzadzic	PA	All
Holden	Torana A9X	Multispares Racing	6	(Australia) Ryan Hansford	PM	All
Holden	Torana A9X	MoComm Motorsport Comms	7	(Australia) Jim Pollicina	PA	6
Holden	Torana A9X	Jesus Racing	09	(Australia) Andrew Fisher	PM	5–6
Holden	Torana A9X	Jesus Racing	15	(Australia) Andrew Fisher	PM	1–4
Holden	Torana A9X	Peter Burnitt Racing	12	(Australia) Peter Burnitt	PS	2–6
Holden	Torana A9X	Williams Outdoort	75	(Australia) Adam Williams	I	1, 4
Holden	Torana SL/R 5000	Northside Taxis	4	(Australia) Allan Hughes	PS	4–6
Holden	Torana SL/R 5000	John Bowe Racing	18	(Australia) John Bowe	PM	All
Holden	Torana SL/R 5000	Hamilton Asphalts Racing	184	(New Zealand) Lance Hughes	I	5–6
Holden	VB Commodore	Adam Garwood Racing	2	(Australia) Adam Garwood	PA	3–6
Holden	VB Commodore	STP / Roadways	4	(Australia) Matthew Carey		1
Pontiac	Firebird	Outback 4x4 Racing	133	(New Zealand) Dennis Lovegrove	I	5–6
Porsche	911 IROC	Chris Meulengraaf Racing	30	(Australia) Chris Meulengraaf	I	4, 6

== Calendar ==
The series was contested over six rounds:

Rd.	Circuit	Location	State	Date
1	Symmons Plains Raceway	Launceston	Tasmania	24 – 26 February
2	Newcastle Street Circuit	Newcastle	New South Wales	10 – 12 March
3	Winton Motor Raceway	Winton	Victoria	9 – 11 June
4	The Bend Motorsport Park	Tailem Bend	South Australia	18 – 20 August
5	Mount Panorama Motor Racing Circuit	Bathurst	New South Wales	10 – 12 November
6	Adelaide Parklands Circuit	Adelaide	South Australia	23 – 26 November

Each round comprised three Series Races and one Trophy Race.

== Standings ==
=== Overall ===
Pos.	Driver	Car	Sym.				New.				Win.				Ben.			Bat.			Ade.			Points
Pos.	Driver	Car	TPH	R1	R2	R3	TPH	R1	R2	R3	TPH	R1	R2	R3	R1	R2	R3	R1	R2	R3	R1	R2	R3	Points
1	(Australia) Steven Johnson	Ford Mustang	5	1	1	2	9	1	1	1	5	1												1057
2	(Australia) Ryan Hansford	Holden Torana A9X	1	3	2	4	3	6	2	2	10													976
3	(Australia) Cameron Tilley	Chrysler Valiant Pacer	6	6	5	5	5	5	6	7	6													873
4	(Australia) Andrew Fisher	Holden Torana A9X	3	2	9	Ret	2	2	4	3	1													844
5	(Australia) Marcus Zukanovic	Ford XD Falcon	4	5	7	7	1	4	5	5	3													840
6	(Australia) John Bowe	Holden Torana SL/R 5000	Ret	DNS	3	1	8	7	7	6	8													762
7	(Australia) Danny Buzadzic	Holden Torana A9X	2	4	4	3					4													632
8	(Australia) Peter Burnitt	Holden Torana A9X	7	DNS	8	Ret	4	8	9	8	11													549
9	(Australia) Warren Trewin	Holden HQ Monaro									11													443
10	(Australia) Tony Karanfilovski	Ford Mustang					7				7													417
11	(Australia) Geoff Fane	Chevrolet Camaro RS					Ret	Ret	8	9	9													413
12	(Australia) Joel Heinrich	Chevrolet Camaro SS																						388
13	(Australia) Adam Garwood	Holden VB Commodore									2													303
14	(Australia) John Adams	Ford Falcon XY GT					11	Ret	10	10														210
15	(Australia) Adam Bressington	Chevrolet Camaro SS					6	3	3	4														148
16	(Australia) Allan Hughes	Holden Torana SL/R 5000																						124
17	(Australia) Jim Pollicina	Holden Torana A9X																						101
18	(Australia) Ben Dunn	Chevrolet Monza																						95
19	(Australia) David Hender	Ford XY Falcon GTHO																						71
20	(Australia) Ian Price	Ford Escort Mk2					10	9	11	Ret	13													41
21	(Australia) Brad Tilley	Ford Mustang																						20
Ineligible for driver points
	(New Zealand) Colin Meadows	Chevrolet Camaro RS																						0
	(New Zealand) Greg Cuttance	Ford XE Falcon																						0
	(New Zealand) Dennis Lovegrove	Pontiac Firebird																						0
	(New Zealand) Tony Galbraith	Chrysler Valiant Charger																						0
	(New Zealand) Sean McCaughan	Ford Falcon XY GTHO																						0
	(New Zealand) Tim Dawson	Ford XE Falcon																						0
	(New Zealand) Lance Hughes	Holden Torana SL/R 5000																						0
	(New Zealand) Craig Buchanan	Ford Mustang GT350																						0
	(Australia) Hagen Zerk	Ford XA Falcon GT Hardtop																						0
	(Australia) Chris Meulengraaf	Porsche 911 IROC																						0
	(Australia) Jason Palmer	BMW E30 M3																						0
	(Australia) Adam Williams	Holden Torana A9X	Ret	Ret	6	6																		0

The race results for the final four rounds are not shown in the above table.
