= Chennai Turbo Riders =

Indian racing team

Chennai Turbo Riders is an Indian motorsport franchise that competes in the Indian Racing League and the F4 Indian Championship. IRL and F4 championship are organised by Racing Promotions Private Limited.

The directors of the franchise owned by Swetha Sundeep Anand, are Ranjith Amizdhan and Ramesh, and Keerthivasan is the team principal. For its fourth season in 2025, Indian racing drivers Tijil Rao and Viswas Vijayraj besides Aqil Alibhai from South Africa and Spain's Laura Camps Torras, a Ferrari Driver Academy alumna, formed the team of drivers.

In 2024, the team lineup was Jon Lancaster (United Kingdom) and Ryan Mohammed (India) for car No.23 and they finished second in the car championship. The team's car No. 18 was driven by former Polo Cup champion Sandeep Kumar (India), Mira Erda (India), and Emily Duggan (Australia) In October 2024 at the Kari Motor Speedway in Coimbatore, Lancaster won in Round 4 to give the team its fourth win. Earlier in Round 3 at the Madras International Circuit, Lancaster won the first race while Ryan Mohammed took a victory in the second.
