= Stuart Oliver (racing driver) =

British racing driver (born 1963)

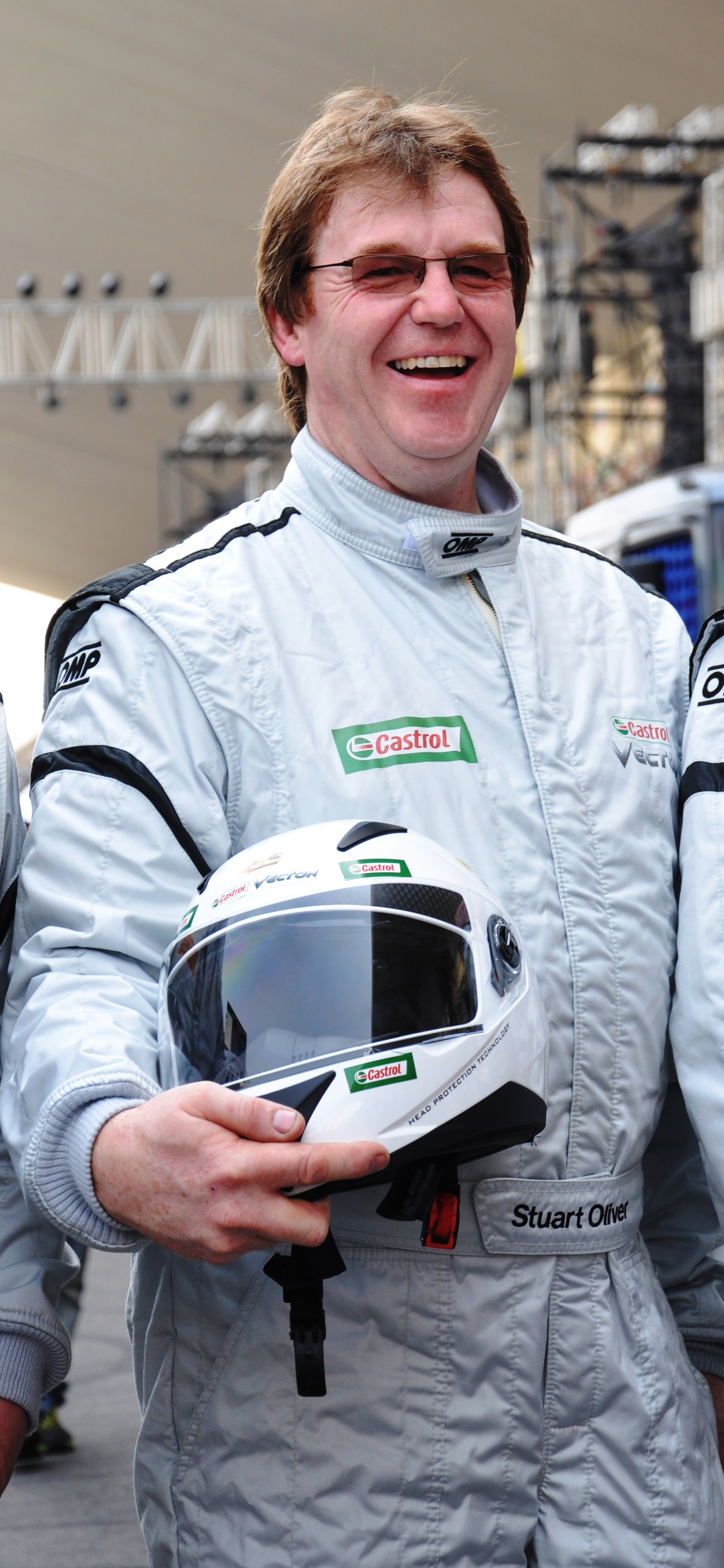
Stuart Oliver, at the Buddh International Circuit in India at the T1 Prima Truck Racing Championship

Stuart William Oliver (born 2 July 1963 in Hexham) is a British auto racing driver. He has won several titles in truck racing. He drives the Kelsa Truck Products Volvo Trucks RH13 in both the British Truck Racing Championship and the FIA European Truck Championship, for Team Oliver Racing. He was jailed in march 2005 for 18 months after being found guilty of disregarding safety regulations and falsifying tachometers to allow his employees to work longer hours than legally allowed.

== Racing career ==
=== Truck Racing ===
Oliver first entered the British Championship in 1998, finishing the season third on points and winning the title of Professional Driver of the Year. A year later in 1995, he was Truck racing champion, going on to dominate the championship in the following seasons. He was champion again in 1999, 2000, 2001, 2002, 2003, 2004, 2007, 2008, 2009 and 2010. In 2004, he also won the FIA European Truck Championship.

In 2011, Oliver joined Truck Race Team Allgäuer based in Weiler, Austria to compete in the FIA European Truck Championship.

=== BTCC ===
For 2008, Oliver raced in saloon cars, in the British Touring Car Championship in-between truck events when there was no fixture clash. He raced in a Lexus IS200 and a SEAT Toledo Cupra for BTC Racing, but the car was both uncompetitive and unreliable, and he only drove in the first part of the season with no points.

=== T1 Prima Truck Racing Championship ===
At the inaugural T1 Prima Truck Racing Championship held by Tata Motors at the Buddh International Circuit in India, Oliver was crowned the first ever champion after winning both races on the single race day of the weekend long event. Oliver stated "It was an amazing experience. The track is beautiful and trucks were performing great. I am thrilled to have won the first ever truck racing championship in India, among the enthusiastic crowd who were cheering each time we drove past the grand stand. I see a lot of potential of this sport here and would love to come back and race again".

The T1 Prima Truck Racing Championship comprised two races, a five-lap Sprint Race and a 15-lap Main Race, with the Champion Award granted to the winning driver on the basis of combined points from both the races. The Team Championship was awarded on the basis of the combined scores of the two drivers of the respective teams from both the races.

All the 12 Tata Prima trucks were Indian but were heavily modified, capable of putting out 370 hp and reaching a top speed of 110 km per hour (limited by FIA) driven by experienced drivers from BTRC.

Oliver also won the 2015 Edition of T1 Racing for Castrol VECTON.

=== Top Gear ===
It has been rumoured that Oliver appeared as the 'Rig Stig' on Top Gear Series 12, Episode 1. The episode saw the £5000 Lorry Challenge where the first event was to powerslide a lorry, with Oliver's own racing truck being used as a demonstration of this.

Oliver has appeared on an episode on Top Gear (2002 TV series) driving a fuel truck in a race comprising airport vehicles.

== Racing record ==
=== Complete British Touring Car Championship results ===
(key) (Races in bold indicate pole position - 1 point awarded in first race) (Races in italics indicate fastest lap - 1 point awarded all races) (* signifies that driver lead race for at least one lap - 1 point awarded all races)

Year	Team	Car	1	2	3	4	5	6	7	8	9	10	11	12	13	14	15	16	17	18	19	20	21	22	23	24	25	26	27	28	29	30	DC	Pts
2008	BTC Racing	Lexus IS200	BRH; 1 Ret	BRH; 2 Ret	BRH; 3 DNS	ROC; 1; 19	ROC; 2 Ret	ROC; 3 Ret																									25th	0
2008	BTC Racing	SEAT Toledo Cupra							DON; 1; 17	DON; 2 Ret	DON; 3; 15	THR; 1	THR; 2	THR; 3	CRO; 1; 21	CRO; 2 Ret	CRO; 3 DNS	SNE; 1	SNE; 2	SNE; 3	OUL; 1	OUL; 2	OUL; 3	KNO; 1	KNO; 2	KNO; 3	SIL; 1	SIL; 2	SIL; 3	BRH; 1	BRH; 2	BRH; 3	25th	0
