= Buddh International Circuit =

Indian motor racing circuit

- Grand Prix Circuit (2011–present)

- Motorcycle Circuit (2011–present)
- Location: Jaypee Sports City, Greater Noida, Uttar Pradesh
- Coordinates: 28°21′2″N 77°32′6″E
- Capacity: 110,000
- FIA Grade: 1 (Note: Buddh International Circuit's Grade 1 license expired 18 November 2022.)
- Owner: Jaypee Group
- Operator: Jaypee Sports International Limited
- Opened: 18 October 2011; 15 years ago
- Construction cost: ₹2,000 crore (US$210 million)
- Architect: Hermann Tilke
- Major events: Current: Indian Racing League (2026); F4 Indian Championship (2026); Former: Grand Prix motorcycle racing Indian motorcycle Grand Prix (2023); Formula One; Indian Grand Prix (2011–2013); Asia Road Racing Championship (2010)
- Website: buddhinternationalcircuit.in

Grand Prix Circuit (2011–present)
- Surface: Asphalt concrete with Graywacke aggregate
- Length: 5.125 km (3.185 mi)
- Turns: 16
- Race lap record: 1:27.249 ( (Germany) Sebastian Vettel, Red Bull RB7, 2011, F1)

Motorcycle Circuit (2011–present)
- Surface: Asphalt concrete with Graywacke aggregate
- Length: 5.010 km (3.113 mi)
- Turns: 13
- Race lap record: 1:45.028 ( (Italy) Marco Bezzecchi, Ducati Desmosedici GP22, 2023, MotoGP)

Short Circuit (2011–present)
- Surface: Asphalt concrete with Graywacke aggregate
- Length: 3.100 km (1.926 mi)
- Turns: 6
- Race lap record: 1:47.204 ( (Czech Republic) David Vršecký, Tata Prima Racing, 2017, Truck racing)

The Buddh International Circuit is an Indian motor racing circuit situated in Jaypee Sports City, Greater Noida, Uttar Pradesh. The track shares its name with Gautama Buddha, as does the district of its location. The track was officially inaugurated on 18 October 2011.

The 5.125 km (3.185 mi) long circuit was designed by German racetrack designer Hermann Tilke. The circuit is best known as the venue for the annual Formula One Indian Grand Prix, which was first hosted in October 2011. However, the Grand Prix was suspended for 2014 and subsequently cancelled due to a tax dispute with the Government of Uttar Pradesh during the Akhilesh Yadav administration.

== History ==
=== 2000s ===
In 2007, a tentative agreement to host the Indian Grand Prix was reached between the Indian Olympic Association and Bernie Ecclestone, then chief-executive of the Formula One Group. A site in Greater Noida in the north Indian state of Uttar Pradesh was chosen as the location of the track that would host the race. Delays in the procurement of the land and construction were reported in early 2009 owing in part to the ongoing financial crisis. The design of the track was ultimately revealed in November 2009.

The venue was slated to debut during the 2010 Formula One season, with construction scheduled to be completed in time. However, this date was pushed back and the inaugural race eventually took place the following year.

=== 2010s ===
The first Indian Grand Prix was held at the Buddh International Circuit on 30 October 2011. It was initially scheduled to take place in December 2011. However, following scheduling conflicts with the Bahrain Grand Prix and its subsequent cancellation, the race was rescheduled to October. The inaugural race was won by Red Bull Racing's Sebastian Vettel, who started from pole position. He also set the fastest lap and therefore race lap record that year, which stood for the following two Grands Prix.

During the 2012 Formula One season and the second Formula One race to take place at the circuit, Sebastian Vettel took pole once again, led every lap and went on to win the race. The fastest lap of the race was set by McLaren's Jenson Button.

The following year, the Indian Grand Prix was the sixteenth race in a nineteen-race season. Sebastian Vettel started on pole and subsequently won the race. Vettel also secured his fourth consecutive Formula One World Drivers' Championship at this race, beating his closest challenger, Ferrari's Fernando Alonso, who finished 11th. Red Bull also secured its fourth consecutive Constructors' Championship. The fastest lap of the race was set by Lotus' Kimi Räikkönen. This was the last Formula One race held at the circuit.

The track was not slated to be part of the 2014 season. One reason given was the rescheduling of the Indian Grand Prix to March for 2014, which made little sense after a race in October 2013. Its appearance in the 2015 season was subsequently ruled out in mid-2014, citing contractual and taxation issues.

Buddh was due to host a GT1 World Championship round as the season finale in December 2012, but the event was cancelled. It was due to host a Superbike World Championship round for four seasons, starting in 2013. However, the 2013 race was cancelled due to operational charges of Buddh International Circuit.

The owners were unable to significantly recover their investments through all three seasons the races were held, and were forced to write off losses worth at least $25 million. In 2016, the owners reiterated their desire to not sell the circuit to other buyers, despite its high maintenance costs, their own financial distress, and the lack of future scheduled international sporting events.

From 2014 to 2026, Buddh hosted no international championships except the Asia Road Racing Championship race in 2016. The circuit continued to host smaller local racing series and championships, including the JK Tyre National Racing Championship which includes open-wheel racing as well as motorcycle racing, and open track days.

==== Tax dispute ====
The Buddh International Circuit is located in the state of Uttar Pradesh, subject to its local taxes as well as national customs duties. The first signs of a dispute arose in 2009: in a letter to the promoters JPSK Sports, the Indian Ministry of Youth Affairs and Sports denied JPSK Sports permission to remit $36.5 million in licensing fees to Formula One administration headquarters in London. The reason given, by the then Chief Minister of Uttar Pradesh - Akhilesh Yadav, was the nature of Formula One, considered not to be a sport but rather entertainment, and its perceived lack of impact on the development of sports in the country. Customs fees for imported components including engines and tyres were not waived, and tax exemptions given to other sports were not offered to the organisers. Fees worth $51.3 million, meant to be paid by Jaypee Sports to Formula One World Championship Limited (FOWC), were still pending as of Liberty Media's acquisition of the Formula One Group in 2016. The government's expectation of tax revenue meant that Jaypee was prevented from paying its dues to FOWC.

In a judgement issued in April 2017, the Supreme Court of India ruled that the circuit constituted a 'permanent establishment', and as such FOWC was liable to pay taxes on any income accrued by it in India, estimated at 40% of business income. It considered royalty payments made by Jaypee to FOWC to be business income as well, subject to tax, which contradicted the original agreement between Jaypee and FOWC that stipulated that any fees would be paid free of taxes. Liberty Media was prepared to settle the due amount in July 2017, setting aside $14.8 million.

=== 2020s ===
For 2022, it was planned that Buddh International Circuit would host events for the Formula Regional Indian Championship and the F4 Indian Championship, however both championships were cancelled in 2022. The circuit also hosted the Indian motorcycle Grand Prix in 2023 as part of the MotoGP World Championship. Several participants received their travel visas just days before the event. A planned second running of the MotoGP event in 2024 was cancelled. Despite being placed as a reserve round in 2025, it was dropped from that role for 2026.

As of 2026, the Adani Group was preparing a roadmap to return Formula One racing at the circuit. This was announced by the Managing Director of Adani Cement in February. This was after the conglomerate secured a majority vote from the lenders in a bid to acquire the debt-laden Jaiprakash Associates for ₹14,535 crore (equivalent to ₹150 billion or US$1.6 billion in 2026). The implementation of any such roadmap is subject to the completion of this acquisition.

The State Transformation Commission of the Government of Uttar Pradesh signed a memorandum of understanding with AVW Global, an automotive and motorsports consultancy firm established by former MotoGP rider Karel Abraham, to establish world-class motorcycle racing ecosystem in the Indian State and bring MotoGP and Asia Road Racing Championship back to the Buddh International Circuit.

== Construction ==
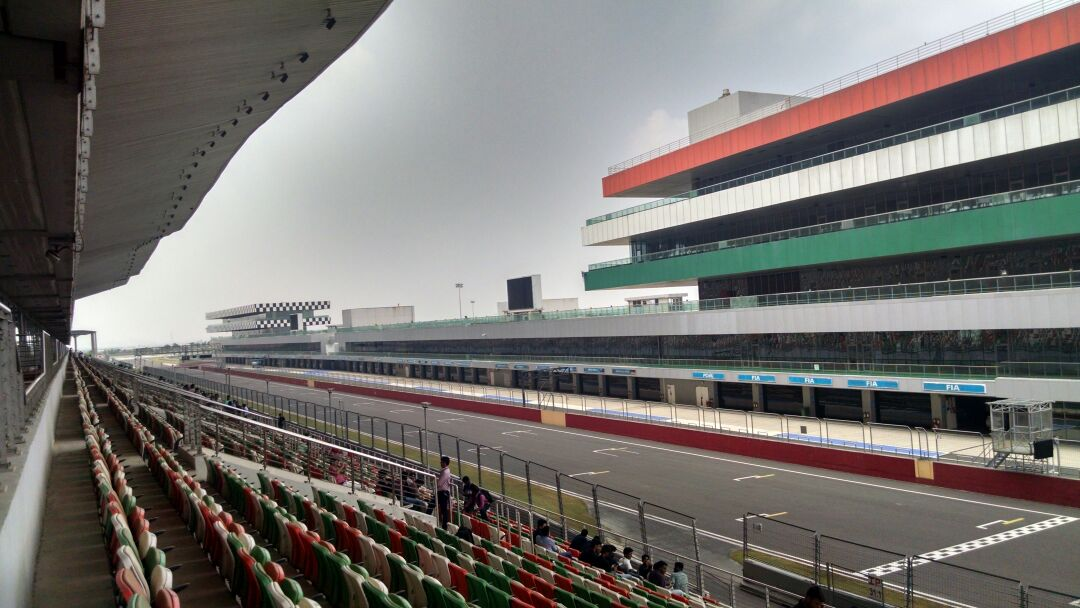
Circuit along with the paddock and main gallery

Formula One racing's governing body, the FIA, had announced the inclusion of the Indian Grand Prix for 30 October 2011. The circuit was officially inaugurated on 18 October 2011, just about two weeks before the first race. Estimated to cost about ₹20 billion ($400 million) to build, it was designed by German engineer Hermann Tilke. The seating capacity was initially expected to be 110,000 with provisions to increase it to 200,000 later on.

The circuit is spread over an area of 874 acres (354 ha), and is part of the 2,500 acres (1,000 ha) Jaypee Greens Sports City, which has increasingly delayed plans to include a 100,000 seating capacity international cricket stadium, 18-hole golf course, 25,000 seat field hockey stadium and a sports academy.

== Layout ==
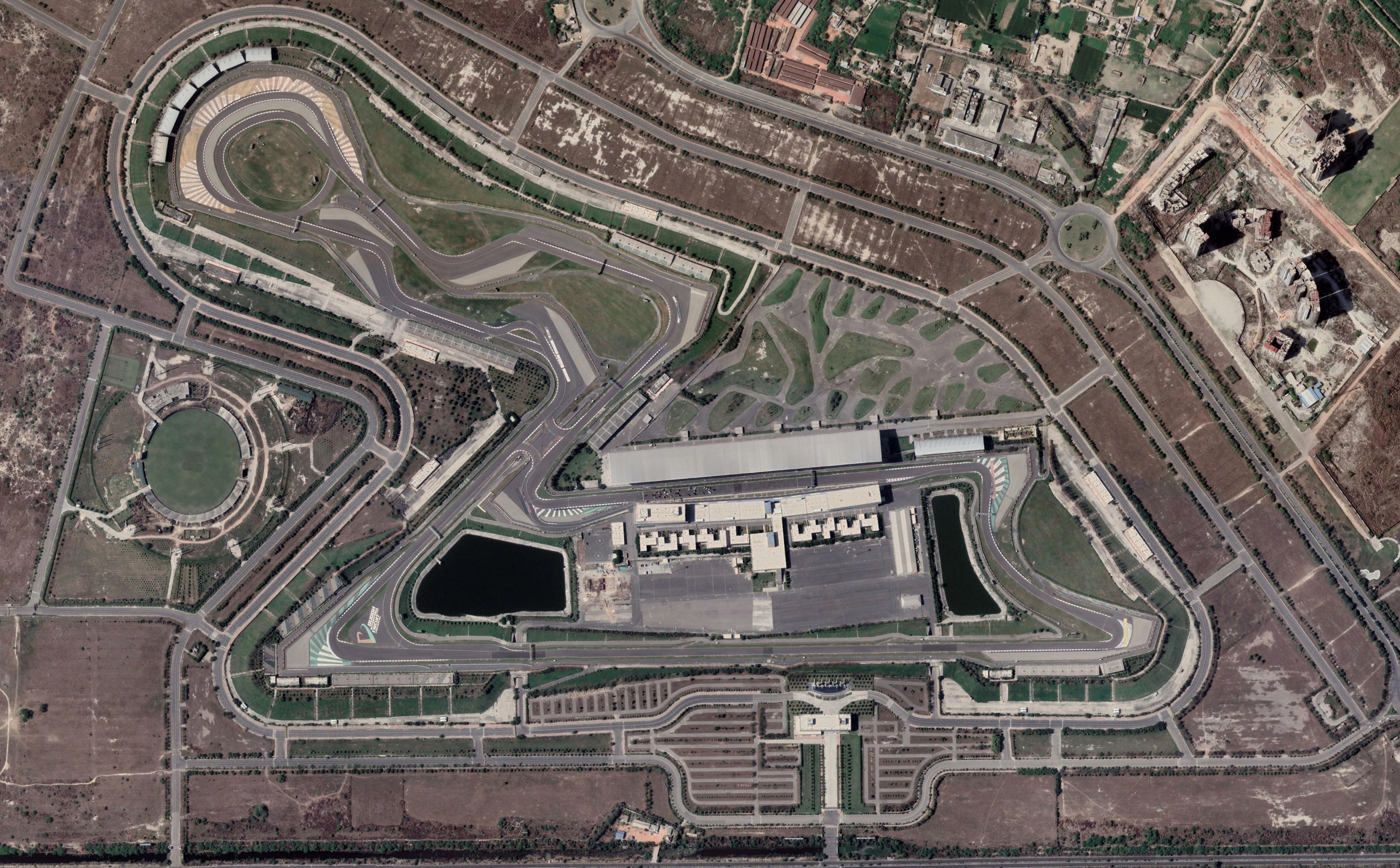
Aerial image of the circuit in 2021

The full circuit has a length of 5.125 km (3.185 mi). The layout incorporated feedback from the teams on how the circuit could be altered to improve overtaking. This resulted in some minor changes before 2010: the planned hairpin at turn seven was removed, and the track at turn three was widened to allow drivers to take different lines throughout the corner. More information was released in August 2010, revealing that there were plans to make the circuit one of the most challenging for drivers, with the circuit rising fourteen metres within the first three corners alone and a banked double-apex bend on the far side of the circuit, nicknamed the Currybolica, as a reference to the infamous banked Parabolica corner on the Monza Circuit in Italy.

The banked multi-apex turn 10–11–12 sequence is one of the most notable sections of the circuit. It has been likened to the long, fast Turn 8 at Turkey's Istanbul Park circuit as it is a challenging sequence that generates high tyre loadings. Unlike Turkey's Turn 8, it tightens on exit and is a clockwise right-hander. Although it is not one of the main overtaking points, it is the corner that shows F1 cars to their full cornering potential. The circuit's main straight, at 1.06 km (0.66 mi), is among the longest in F1, with a key overtaking point at its end. The pitlane is also one of the longest in F1, at more than 600 metres: as in most races with pit stops, time spent in the pitlane is an important factor in determining race strategies.

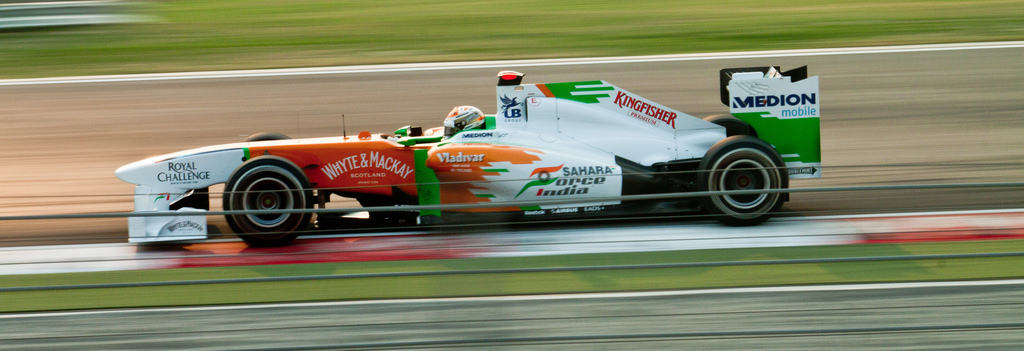
Adrian Sutil during the 2011 Indian Grand Prix

Before the opening weekend, the expected lap time for a Formula One car around the track was 1 minute, 27.02 seconds, at an average speed of 210.03 km/h (130.51 mph). At the end of the long straight between corners 3 and 4, Formula One cars were expected to reach a top speed of about 318 km/h (198 mph). In the inaugural qualifying session, Sebastian Vettel turned in a lap time of 1:24.178, beating the predicted lap times from tyre manufacturer Pirelli. Scuderia Toro Rosso driver Jaime Alguersuari posted the top speed through the speed trap, reaching 324.2 km/h (201.4 mph).

== Reception ==
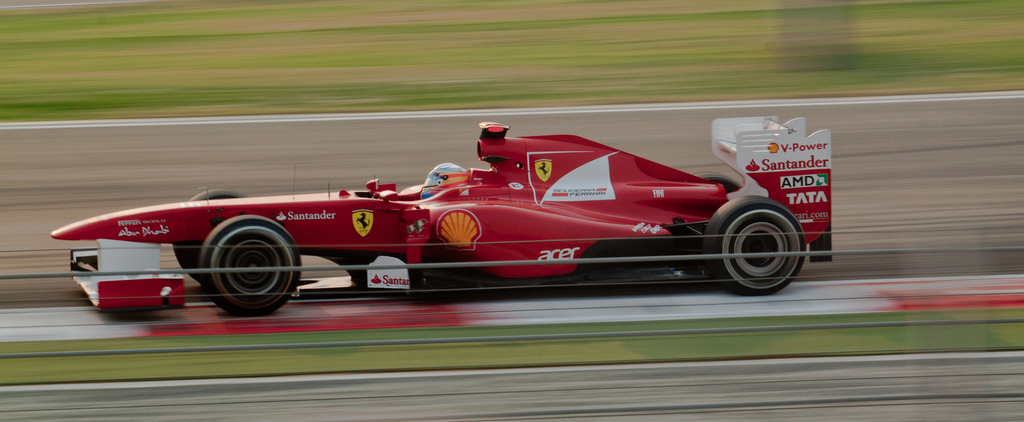
Fernando Alonso during the 2011 Indian Grand Prix

The reception among drivers was positive, with praise for the high-speed layout and challenging corner combinations that Jenson Button described as difficult to drive in a consistently quick fashion.

Lewis Hamilton compared the track to the classic Circuit de Spa-Francorchamps, a track known for high speeds and the type of corner-to-corner flow that comes from natural terrain. Inaugural winner Sebastian Vettel praised the track saying that "there is a lot of elevation change around the lap which adds to the fun, from as much as 8% downhill and up to 10% uphill; it's like a roller coaster. It really has emerged as one of the most challenging circuits on the calendar for the drivers."

== Branding ==
Originally known as the Jaypee Group Circuit or the Jaypee International Circuit after the circuit's owners, the circuit was officially named the Buddh International Circuit in April 2011. According to Mr Sameer Gaur, the MD and CEO of Jaypee Sports International Limited, the name 'Buddh International Circuit' has been chosen with reference to the area where the racetrack is situated – Gautam Buddh Nagar district. Because of its location, naming the circuit 'Buddh International Circuit' was a logical choice for the company.

The logo consists of a stylized 'B' in the shape of a heart, which stands for 'Buddh' and 'Bharat' (the native name of India). The saffron, green and white colours used in the logo are representative of the Indian flag, while the curves in the stylized 'B' in the logo represent the lines of a racetrack.

== Awards and recognition ==
Buddh International Circuit, which hosted India's first Formula One Grand Prix on 30 October 2011, has been awarded the '2011 Motorsport Facility of the Year' award at the Professional Motorsport World Expo 2011. BIC has also been honored with the 'Best Promoter Trophy' for the successful conduct of Formula One races in 2011 & 2012 at the FIA prize-giving gala.

== Events ==
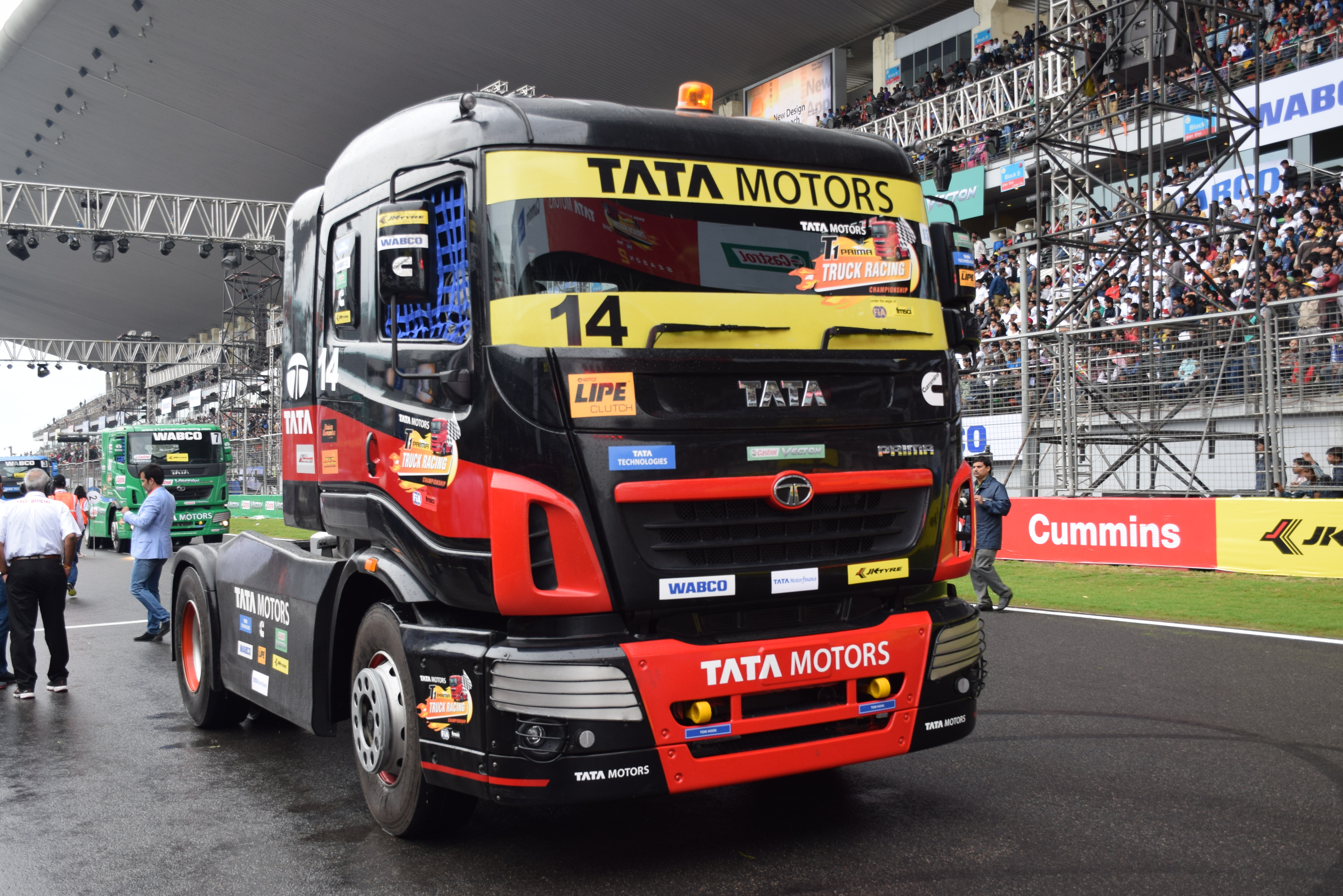
Prima Truck Racing

Current

- November: Indian Racing League, F4 Indian Championship

Former

- Grand Prix motorcycle racing
  - Indian motorcycle Grand Prix (2023)
- Asia Road Racing Championship (2016)
- Formula One
  - Indian Grand Prix (2011–2013)
- JK Racing Asia Series (2011–2012)
- MRF Challenge Formula 2000 Championship (2012–2013, 2017)
- T1 Prima Truck Racing Championship (2014–2017)
- X1 Racing League (2019)

== Lap records ==
As of November 2026, the fastest official race lap records at the Buddh International Circuit are listed as:

Category	Time	Driver	Vehicle	Event
Grand Prix Circuit (2011–present): 5.125 km (3.185 mi)
Formula One	1:27.249	Sebastian Vettel	Red Bull RB7	2011 Indian Grand Prix
Group CN	1:54.866	Shane Chandaria	Wolf GB08 Thunder	2026 1st Buddh Indian Racing League round
Formula BMW	1:59.395	Nabil Jeffri	Mygale FB02	2012 2nd Buddh JK Racing Asia Series round
Formula 4	1:59.975	Arjun Chheda	Mygale M21-F4	2026 1st F4 India Buddh round
Motorcycle Circuit (2011–present): 5.010 km (3.113 mi)
MotoGP	1:45.028	Marco Bezzecchi	Ducati Desmosedici GP22	2023 Indian motorcycle Grand Prix
Moto2	1:52.104	Pedro Acosta	Kalex Moto2	2023 Indian motorcycle Grand Prix
Supersport	1:55.855	Anthony West	Yamaha YZF-R6	2016 Buddh ARRC round
Moto3	1:59.472	Ayumu Sasaki	Husqvarna FR250GP	2023 Indian motorcycle Grand Prix
Asia Productions 250	2:16.051	Peerapong Loiboonpen	Yamaha YZF-R25	2016 Buddh ARRC round
Asia Dream Cup	2:24.183	Zhou Shung Jun Jie	Honda CBR250R	2016 Buddh ARRC round
Asia Underbone 130	2:27.020	Florianus Roy Brilya	Yamaha T-150	2016 Buddh ARRC round
Short Circuit (2011–present): 3.100 km (1.926 mi)
Truck racing	1:47.204	David Vršecký	Tata Prima Racing	2017 T1 Prima Truck Racing Championship

== See also ==
- Chennai Formula Racing Circuit
- Kari Motor Speedway
- Madras Motor Race Track
- Hyderabad Street Circuit
