= 2026 F4 Indian Championship =

Motor racing championship

The 2026 F4 Indian Championship is the fourth season of the F4 Indian Championship. It is a motor racing championship for open wheel, formula racing cars regulated according to FIA Formula 4 regulations. The season commences on 9-11 at the Kari Motor Speedway and concludes at the circuit yet to be announced on 6 December.

== Teams and drivers ==
All cars are run by Racing Promotions Private Limited.

Team	No.	Driver	Rounds
Chennai Turbo Riders	9	(India) Sai Aditya	1–4
Chennai Turbo Riders	98	(Kenya) Anay Doshi	1–4
Goa Aces JA Racing	11	(South Africa) Luviwe Sambudla	1–4
Goa Aces JA Racing	20	(United States) Aryan Narola	1–4
Ahmedabad Apex Racers	12	(Norway) Mathias Forland	1–3
Ahmedabad Apex Racers	42	(India) Arjun Chheda	4
Ahmedabad Apex Racers	66	(Singapore) Kareen Kaur	3–4
Hyderabad Blackbirds	14	(India) Bhuvan Bonu	1–4
Hyderabad Blackbirds	24	(United Kingdom) Shravan Shanmugavel	1–2
Hyderabad Blackbirds	44	(Denmark) Janine Wermuth	3–4
Godspeed Kochi	15	(United Kingdom) Lily-May Watkins	3–4
Godspeed Kochi	23	(South Africa) Mahlori Mabunda	1–4
Kolkata Royal Tigers	17	(Singapore) Aaron Mehta	1–4
Kolkata Royal Tigers	67	(India) Swarnav Das	1–4
Speed Demons Delhi	33	(India) Krishay Gutte	1–4
Speed Demons Delhi	77	(South Africa) Ntiyiso Mabunda	1–4
Kichcha's Kings Bengaluru	36	(South Africa) Enzo Rujugiro	1–4
Kichcha's Kings Bengaluru	53	(Australia) Aris Kyriakou	1–4

=== Indian F4 Global Shootout Program ===
Racing Promotions Private Limited announced in May 2024 the F4 Global Shootout Program offering scholarships towards the participation in the championship. The estimated cost of the full season of the series is €120,000 and the winner of the shootout would get a fully paid seat in the upcoming season. The runner-up and the third placed driver would get 30% and 20% respectively of the winner's scholarship while each of other finalists would be awarded €15,000. The 2026 program was held on 18–20 May at the Circuit du Var, France, in the partnership with the driving school AGS Formule 1. The following eleven drivers were selected:

- (Australia) Oceane Colangelo
- (India) Jagrat Detroja
- (Kenya) Anay Doshi
- (Norway) Mathias Forland
- (Italy) Christian Giovanni
- (Singapore) Kareen Kaur
- (Singapore) Aaron Mehta
- (United States) Aryan Narola
- (United Kingdom) Shravan Shanmugavel
- (Australia) Jordan Singh
- (Australia) Cooper Stapleton

Aaron Mehta was declared the winner of the shootout.

== Calendar and results ==
The dates were announced on 22 July. One week before the first race weekend, it was announced that the first two rounds would be held at Kari Motor Speedway. According to Indian reports, Round 3 is expected to take place at the Madras International Circuit, with the season finale to be held in Navi Mumbai. On 7 October, the remaining circuits were revealed, as the Buddh International Circuit and Navi Mumbai Street Circuit will host races for the first time. All rounds are held as part of the Indian Racing Festival.

Round		Circuit	Date	Pole position	Fastest lap	Winning driver	Winning team	Support bill
1	R1	Kari Motor Speedway, Coimbatore	12 September	(Singapore) Aaron Mehta	(United States) Aryan Narola	(South Africa) Luviwe Sambudla	Goa Aces JA Racing	JK Racing India Series
1	R2	Kari Motor Speedway, Coimbatore	13 September		(United States) Aryan Narola	(United States) Aryan Narola	Goa Aces JA Racing	JK Racing India Series
1	R3	Kari Motor Speedway, Coimbatore	13 September	(Australia) Aris Kyriakou	(Australia) Aris Kyriakou	(Australia) Aris Kyriakou	Kichcha's Kings Bengaluru	JK Racing India Series
2	R1	Kari Motor Speedway, Coimbatore	19 September	(South Africa) Luviwe Sambudla	(South Africa) Luviwe Sambudla	(South Africa) Luviwe Sambudla	Goa Aces JA Racing	Stand-alone event
2	R2	Kari Motor Speedway, Coimbatore	20 September		(South Africa) Mahlori Mabunda	(India) Bhuvan Bonu	Hyderabad Blackbirds	Stand-alone event
2	R3	Kari Motor Speedway, Coimbatore	20 September	(South Africa) Luviwe Sambudla	(South Africa) Luviwe Sambudla	(South Africa) Luviwe Sambudla	Goa Aces JA Racing	Stand-alone event
3	R1	Madras International Circuit, Irungattukottai	22 October	(Singapore) Aaron Mehta	(South Africa) Luviwe Sambudla	(South Africa) Luviwe Sambudla	Goa Aces JA Racing	Indian Racing League
3	R2	Madras International Circuit, Irungattukottai	23 October		(South Africa) Luviwe Sambudla	(South Africa) Luviwe Sambudla	Goa Aces JA Racing	Indian Racing League
3	R3	Madras International Circuit, Irungattukottai	23 October	(Singapore) Aaron Mehta	(United States) Aryan Narola	(Singapore) Aaron Mehta	Kolkata Royal Tigers	Indian Racing League
4	R1	Buddh International Circuit, Greater Noida	31 October	(India) Arjun Chheda	(South Africa) Ntiyiso Mabunda	(South Africa) Ntiyiso Mabunda	Speed Demons Delhi	Indian Racing League
4	R2	Buddh International Circuit, Greater Noida	1 November		(India) Arjun Chheda	(United States) Aryan Narola	Goa Aces JA Racing	Indian Racing League
4	R3	Buddh International Circuit, Greater Noida	1 November	(Australia) Aris Kyriakou	(India) Arjun Chheda	(United States) Aryan Narola	Goa Aces JA Racing	Indian Racing League
5	R1	Buddh International Circuit, Greater Noida	28–29 November					Indian Racing League
5	R2	Buddh International Circuit, Greater Noida	28–29 November					Indian Racing League
5	R3	Buddh International Circuit, Greater Noida	28–29 November					Indian Racing League
6	R1	Navi Mumbai Street Circuit, Navi Mumbai	5–6 December					Indian Racing League
6	R2	Navi Mumbai Street Circuit, Navi Mumbai	5–6 December					Indian Racing League
6	R3	Navi Mumbai Street Circuit, Navi Mumbai	5–6 December					Indian Racing League

== Championship standings ==
Points are awarded as follows:

Races	Position, points per race									
Races	**1st**	**2nd**	**3rd**	**4th**	**5th**	**6th**	**7th**	**8th**	**9th**	**10th**
Races 1 & 3	25	18	15	12	10	8	6	4	2	1
Races 2	10	8	6	5	4	3	2	1		

=== Drivers' Championship ===
Pos	Driver	KAR1			KAR2			MAD			BUD1			BUD2			NMB			Pts
Pos	Driver	R1	R2	R3	R1	R2	R3	R1	R2	R3	R1	R2	R3	R1	R2	R3	R1	R2	R3	Pts
1	(South Africa) Luviwe Sambudla	1	8	4	**1**	Ret	**1**	1	1	3	2	Ret	Ret							156
2	(Australia) Aris Kyriakou	2	2	**1**	2	3	2	5	3	6	7	2	**12**							131
3	(South Africa) Ntiyiso Mabunda	Ret	11	Ret	3	2	4	2	2	2	1	3	3							125
4	(United States) Aryan Narola	6	1	6	7	5	Ret	3	4	13	3	1	1							106
5	(Singapore) Aaron Mehta	**3**	7	3	5	9	Ret	**4**	6	**1**	12	Ret	Ret							82
6	(South Africa) Mahlori Mabunda	7	Ret	2	4	7	6	13	9	5	4	Ret	Ret							68
7	(India) Swarnav Das	5	3	9	EX	8	3	Ret	10	4	6	4	6							67
8	(India) Bhuvan Bonu	4	4	5	6	1	7	7	8	Ret	10	5	11							63
9	(India) Krishay Gutte	9	5	DSQ	EX	6	5	6	5	9	8	10	4							49
10	(South Africa) Enzo Rujugiro	10	9	8	8	4	9	10	7	7	11	7	5							37
11	(United Kingdom) Lily-May Watkins							8	12	10	5	8	7							22
12	(India) Arjun Chheda										**14**	6	2							21
13	(Kenya) Anay Doshi	11	10	7	9	Ret	10	9	11	8	Ret	Ret	Ret							15
14	(India) Sai Aditya	8	Ret	Ret	10	11	8	14	Ret	Ret	13	12	9							11
15	(Singapore) Kareen Kaur							12	13	11	9	9	8							6
16	(Norway) Mathias Forland	12	6	10	Ret	10	11	Ret	14	12										4
17	(Denmark) Janine Wermuth							11	Ret	14	Ret	11	10							1
–	(United Kingdom) Shravan Shanmugavel	Ret	DNS	DNS	DNS	DNS	DNS													0
Pos	Driver	R1	R2	R3	R1	R2	R3	R1	R2	R3	R1	R2	R3	R1	R2	R3	R1	R2	R3	Pts
Pos	Driver	KAR1			KAR2			MAD			BUD1			BUD2			NMB			Pts

Colour	Result
Gold	Winner
Silver	Second place
Bronze	Third place
Green	Points classification
Blue	Non-points classification
Blue	Non-classified finish (NC)
Purple	Retired, not classified (Ret)
Red	Did not qualify (DNQ)
Red	Did not pre-qualify (DNPQ)
Black	Disqualified (DSQ)
White	Did not start (DNS)
White	Withdrew (WD)
White	Race cancelled (C)
Blank	Did not practice (DNP)
Blank	Did not arrive (DNA)
Blank	Excluded (EX)

**Bold** – Pole
Italics – Fastest Lap
† — Did not finish, but classified
