= Indian Racing League =

Formula 4 League

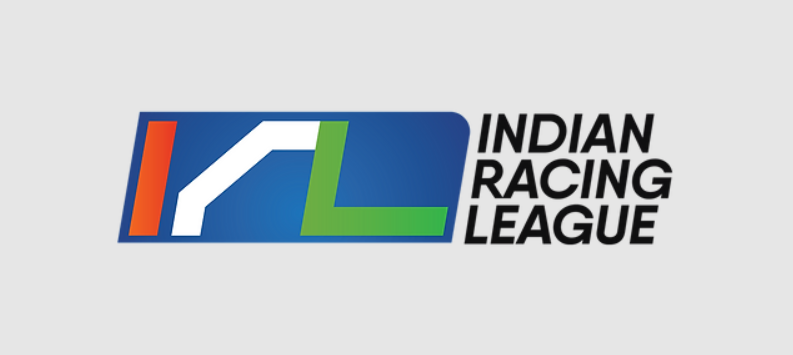
- Category: Group CN
- Country: India
- Inaugural season: 2022 (2019 as X1 Racing League)
- Drivers: 24
- Drivers' champion: (South Africa) Raoul Hyman (India) Sohil Shah
- Teams' champion: Goa Aces JA Racing
- Official website: rpplind.com

The Indian Racing League is an auto racing championship based in India.

== History ==
It is co-founded by Indian professional drivers, Aditya Patel and Armaan Ebrahim.

For the first season in 2019, the series operated decade-old Formula BMW machinery having originally planned to run Radicals. Just two events were held having scheduled four, and track-time at the second and final round was condensed due to travel constraints. A number of the cars suffered from mechanical problems, halving the field from 12 cars to 6 at the second and final event. A number of drivers also abandoned the championship between the events on safety grounds – including Christina Nielsen and Mathias Lauda, who reported that their race-suits had been soaked by a fuel leak during a qualifying session. The Bangalore Racing Stars team were crowned champions.

After delays due to the coronavirus pandemic, the championship returned in late-2022 having been renamed the Indian Racing League. The series was scheduled to be held alongside the Formula Regional Indian Championship before moving to a standalone schedule, whilst organisers imported a fleet of Group CN-class Wolf GB08s to avoid the technical issues that beset the first season. Despite this, all of the races at the first event in Hyderabad were cancelled after Vishnu Prasad broke his leg in a practice crash. Two events were held at the Madras International Circuit before returning to Hyderabad, and whilst the Hyderabad Blackbirds team dominated the Irungattukottai rounds with the help of experienced driver Neel Jani, the new Godspeed Kochi franchise overhauled them with a dominant display at a wet-dry finale. The season however was an administrative nightmare; suffering from a lack of public communication regarding the opening round, confusion over whether or not a drivers' championship was to be awarded, the final points tally not aligning with the provided points system, and mechanical issues with the cars (wheels falling off at the first Irungattukottai event and engines flooding during the rolling starts at the finale).

With an updated format, and a calendar including the Buddh International Circuit as well as a new street course around Chennai's Island Grounds, the championship appeared to be in better shape approaching their third season in 2023. However, issues immediately arose as the first round was moved from Hyderabad to Irungattukottai less than a week out due to local elections, whilst Buddh disappeared off the calendar entirely. Ultimately, the championship hosted all three of its events at Irungattukottai due to infrastructure damage caused by Cyclone Michaung, with bad weather from the system impacting several races as well. Two race wins for Raoul Hyman helped he and co-driver Sohil Shah to the drivers' championship, whilst Bangalore Speedsters claimed the teams' championship aided by Sarah Moore's victory in the first round – Moore becoming the first woman to win a race in the series.

The 2024 season started in remarkably organised fashion, with the first two races at Irungattukottai going off without a hitch – Jon Lancaster scored his and the Chennai Turbo Riders' first race win in the season-opener after Neel Jani retired from the lead with a handful of laps remaining, whilst Alister Yoong won the second race for the rebranded Rarh Bengal Tigers; Sourav Ganguly and the Shrachi Group purchased the Godspeed Kochi franchise in the off-season. The series hosted its first night event around the Island Grounds a week later, with the wins shared by Raoul Hyman and Álvaro Parente after track action was delayed due to issues with circuit homologation. Three more rounds at Irungattukottai and Kari Motor Speedway followed, where the No. 24 Goa Aces JA Racing entry piloted by Raoul Hyman and Sohil Shah was able to notch up three more victories on the way to their entrant championship title.

The 2025 season introduced a pre-season driver draft, where teams were able to pick their driver lineups. The first three race weekends, held at Kari and Irungattukottai, largely went ahead without issue, although the results of the opening round were not counted in the official standings documents without any explanation. That meant wins for Goa's Hyman and Delhi's Sai Sanjay were meaningless, before Shahan Ali Mohsin, Sohil Shah, Kyle Kumaran and Hyman took victories in the following rounds as the No. 31 Hyderabad Blackbirds entry assumed the championship lead through consistent results. Two further rounds, both at new venues in Goa and Mumbai, were planned to follow, but both were postponed multiple times. The event at the new Goa Street Circuit was finally held in February 2026, and when it rolled around, it not only had a completely different three-race format with a feature race that reintroduced the mid-race driver swap, the series also switched to using the Alpine-powered Mygale M21-F4 cars used in the F4 Indian Championship. Two of the three races were won by Hyman's Goa Aces entry, sending that car to a lead of the standings that would become the championship title when the final round was cancelled.

In 2026, the championship is scheduled to undergo another change in machinery, with the series announcing a switch to Formula Regional Gen1 cars.

== Format ==
Teams are franchise-based and represent Indian cities. Each team has two cars and four drivers; two drivers must be Indian or of Indian descent, and the other two drivers – one male and one female – must come from outside of India. Two drivers compete in each car, with the line-ups determined by the teams.

In 2019, each event consisted of three 30mins + 1 lap races. The races were relays, with a mandatory pit-stop for a driver change in each.

In 2022, three races were again held per round – but the first two of these were 25min + 1 lap "sprint races" and the third was a 45min + 1 lap "feature race". As there were two drivers per car, for Race 1 Driver A qualified and Driver B started, for Race 2 Driver B qualified and Driver A started, and the feature race saw the grid determined by aggregate event points with both drivers competing by way of a mandatory driver change.

In 2023, two qualifying sessions and two races were held per event – with the "feature race" including driver swaps discontinued. Two drivers were entered in each car, with each driver contesting one of the two event days – consisting of one 20-minute practice session, one 10-minute qualifying session and a 20-minute + 1 lap race per day. This format was retained in 2024, with the race length increased by 5 minutes.

2025 initially continued the format seen in 2023 and 2024, until the final round, which returned to a format similar to the one seen in 2022. Three races were held in that final round, two 25min + 1 lap "sprint races" and a 45min + 1 lap "feature race" with a mid-race driver swap. Four qualifying sessions were held across the weekend, one ahead of each sprint race to set the grids for these races, and two more ahead of the feature race, one for each driver sharing a car, with their times added to a total time to form the grid.

== Champions ==
Season	Driver	Team and contributing drivers	
2019	not awarded	Bangalore Racing Stars	(India) Nayan Chatterjee (Denmark) Michelle Gatting (India) Arjun Maini (India) Vishnu Prasad (United Kingdom) Oliver Webb
2020 – 2021	not held		
2022	(India) Akhil Rabindra; Hyderabad Blackbirds	Godspeed Kochi	(United Kingdom) Jordan Albert (Note: Albert entered in the first round in Hyderabad, in which practice sessions were held but qualifying and race sessions were cancelled.) (India) Ruhaan Alva (United States) Nikhil Bohra (Liechtenstein) Fabienne Wohlwend (Malaysia) Alister Yoong
2023	(South Africa) Raoul Hyman (India) Sohil Shah; Goa Aces	Bangalore Speedsters	(India) Ashwin Datta (India) Kyle Kumaran (United Kingdom) Sarah Moore (United Kingdom) Oliver Webb
2024	(South Africa) Raoul Hyman (India) Sohil Shah; Goa Aces JA Racing	Goa Aces JA Racing	(South Africa) Raoul Hyman (Czech Republic) Gabriela Jílková (India) Shahan Ali Mohsin (India) Sohil Shah
2025–26	(South Africa) Raoul Hyman (Liechtenstein) Fabienne Wohlwend; Goa Aces JA Racing	Goa Aces JA Racing	(South Africa) Raoul Hyman (Liechtenstein) Fabienne Wohlwend (India) Akash Gowda (India) Chetan Surineni
