= F4 Indian Championship =

Single-Seater Racing Championship

- Category: FIA Formula 4
- Country: India
- Inaugural season: 2023
- Constructors: Mygale
- Engine suppliers: Alpine
- Tyre suppliers: JK Tyre
- Drivers' champion: (Kenya) Shane Chandaria

F4 Indian Championship is a single-seater motorsport series based in India. The series is run to the FIA's Formula 4 regulations and organized by Racing Promotions Pvt Ltd. The inaugural season was held in 2023.

The winner of the series earns the right to compete in the next season of Formula Regional Indian Championship for free.

== History ==
Gerhard Berger and the FIA Singleseater Commission launched Formula 4 in March 2013. The goal of the Formula 4 was to make the ladder to Formula 1 more transparent. Besides sporting and technical regulations, costs are also regulated. A car to compete in this category may not exceed €30,000 and a single season in Formula 4 May not exceed €100,000.

The creation of the series and Formula Regional Indian Championship was teased on 15 August 2021 on the social media of Mumbai Falcons, an Indian team participating in 2021 F3 Asian Championship. The official launch of the championship was held on 19 August 2021.

== Format ==
The weekend's format is set to have three races per weekend with one single qualifying session. The fastest lap will award pole position for Race 1, while Race 3's grid will be set according to the 2nd fastest lap of every driver at the qualifying session. Race 2's grid will be a reverse grid from Race 1's results.

== Car ==
Initially, the championship was set to feature Tatuus F4-T421 chassis, Abarth as the engine supplier and Prema Powerteam responsible for the technical side of things to ensure parity among all competitors. After failing to run in 2022, the championship switched for the 2023 season to Mygale M21-F4 chassis, Alpine as the engine supplier and MP Motorsport for the technical support.

== Broadcasting ==
For the 2023 season, the races were broadcast free of charge on YouTube. In India, the races were also broadcast on television by Star Sports. In 2024, the races were primarily streamed online in India via TrillerTV+. In 2025, the races were again offered on TrillerTV+, while additional pay television coverage was provided by Star Sports and JioHotstar. Motorsport Television Deutschland also broadcast selected races via Facebook.

For the 2026 season, coverage via Star Sports and JioHotstar remained available. Viewers can choose between four different commentary languages: English, Hindi, Kannada, and Tamil. Motorsport Television Deutschland also broadcasts all races of the 2026 season on its website, with the broadcasts geo-blocked in India. Selected races are broadcast with German commentary, while other races are broadcast in English.

== Champions ==
Season	Driver	Team	Races	Poles	Wins	Podiums	Fastest lap	Points	Margins
2023	(Australia) Cooper Webster	(India) Chennai Turbo Riders	15	5	8	11	7	282.5	62.5
2024	(South Africa) Aqil Alibhai	(India) Hyderabad Blackbirds	15	1	6	4	12	282	22
2025	(Kenya) Shane Chandaria	(India) Chennai Turbo Riders	13	6	3	6	4	158	24

== Circuits ==
- **Bold** denotes a circuit iss used in the 2026 season.

Number	Circuits	Rounds	Years
1	(India) **Madras International Circuit**	9 (Note: Madras International Circuit hosted 4 rounds in 2023, and 2 rounds in 2024—2025.)	2023–present
2	(India) **Kari Motor Speedway**	7 (Note: Kari Motor Speedway hosted 3 rounds in 2025, and 2 rounds in 2024, and it hosts 2 rounds in 2026.)	2024–present
3	(India) **Buddh International Circuit**	2 (Note: Buddh International Circuit hosts 2 rounds in 2026.)	2026
4	(India) Chennai Formula Racing Circuit	1	2024
