= T1 Prima Truck Racing Championship =

T1 Prima Truck Racing Championship is a truck racing championship in India by Tata Motors. This was also on the calendar of Fédération Internationale de l'Automobile (FIA) and Federation of Motor Sports Clubs of India (FMSCI). This event was held 23 March 2014 at Buddh International Circuit, Greater Noida. This racing championship had drivers from the British Truck Racing Championship and the European Truck Racing Championship. Top British truck racing drivers, including Bran John Burt, David Jenkins, Paul Mccumisky, David Ball, Stuart Oliver, James Horne, Simon Ashley Reid, Richard Collett, Mat Summerfield, Steven Powell, Steven Thomas and Graham Powell showed their driving skills during the event. The championship was won by Stuart Oliver.

== 2014 Race ==
At the inaugural T1 Prima Truck Racing Championship held by Tata Motors at the Buddh International Circuit in India, Stuart Oliver was crowned the first ever champion after winning both races on the single race day of the weekend long event. Stuart stated "It was an amazing experience. The track is beautiful and trucks were performing great. I am thrilled to have won the first ever truck racing championship in India, among the enthusiastic crowd who were cheering each time we drove past the grand stand. I see a lot of potential of this sport here and would love to come back and race again."

== Trucks and Teams ==
There were twelve Prima trucks which were divided into six teams having two trucks each. The Prima truck had a massive power of 370 bhp @ 2100 rpm and a top speed of 110 kmph. The trucks were modified as per guidelines of British truck racing championship Association to provide maximum safety and performance. The teams participating were:

1. Castrol Vecton
2. Cummins
3. TATA Technologies Motor Sports
4. Dealer Daredevils
5. Dealer Warriors
6. Allied Partners
