= Truck racing =

Form of motorsport road racing

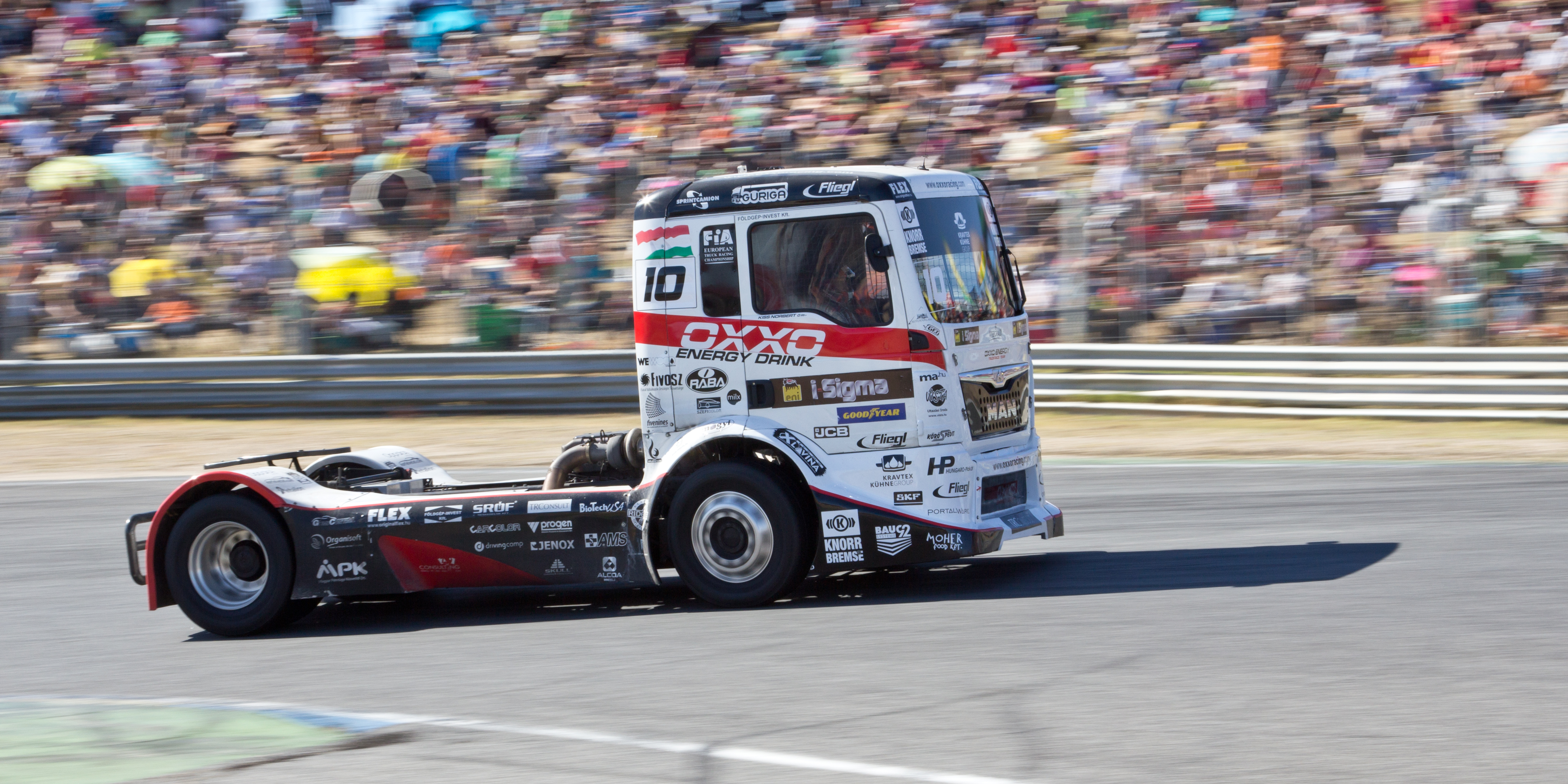
Norbert Kiss racing at the GP Camión de Espana, 2013

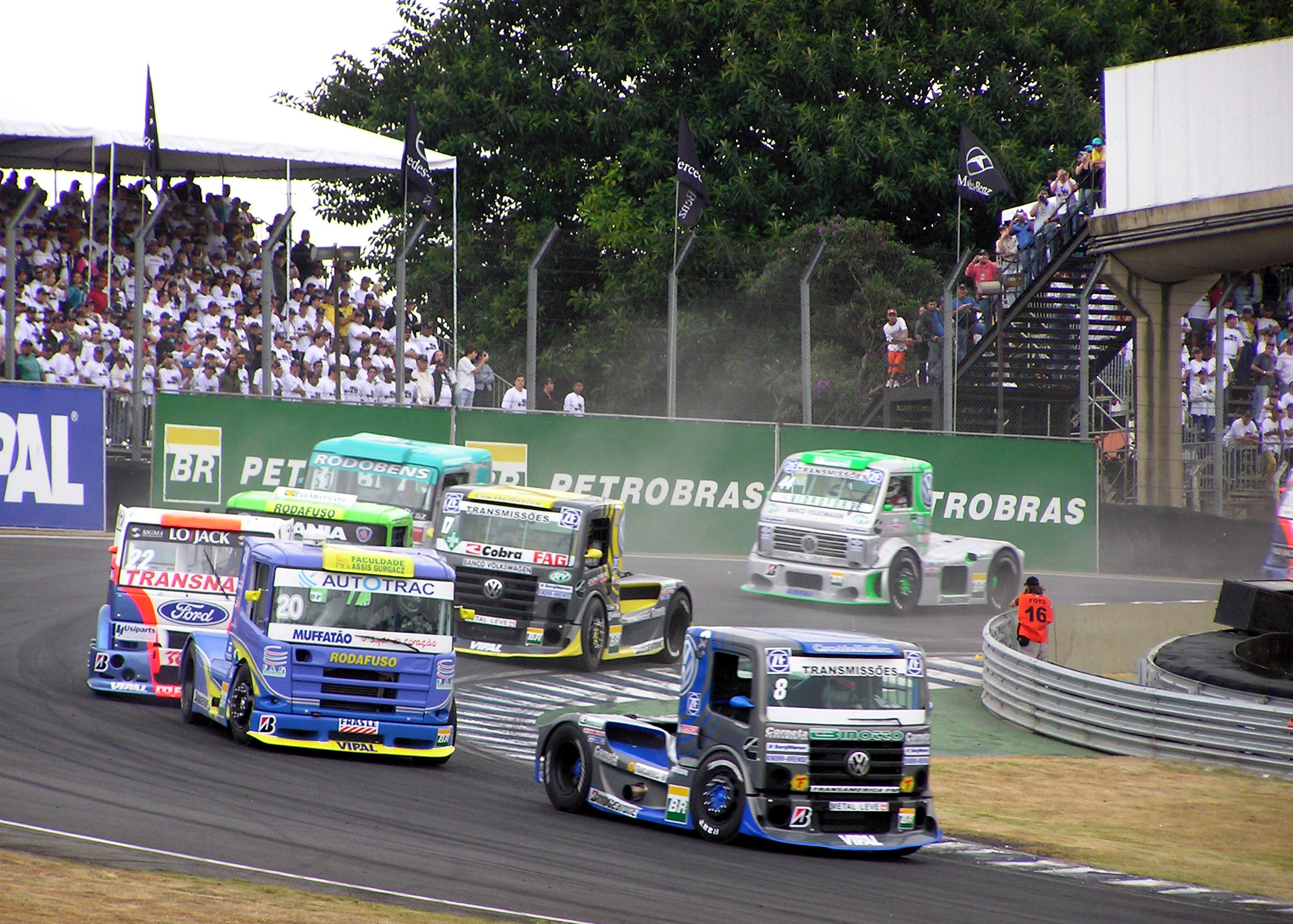
Fórmula Truck in 2006 at Interlagos

Truck racing is a form of motorsport road racing which involves modified versions of heavy tractor units on road racing or oval track circuits.

== History ==
The sport started in the United States at the Atlanta Motor Speedway on June 17, 1979. Mike "Ro-HoA" Adams finished first among 30 competitors in the inaugural 200 miles (320 km) race (billed as the "Bobtail 200") in his rebuilt, 20-wheel, 1965 GMC truck, in front of 18,500 spectators. Footage of the race was used in the opening scene in the movie Smokey and the Bandit II.

Maximum race speed is restricted to 160 km/h (100 mph) for safety reasons, and a minimum weight limit is 5500 kg. Races start from a rolling start, and commonly races last from 8 to 12 laps. Although a non contact sport, due to the physical size, and closeness of trucks to one another during races, minor collisions can often occur. However, injuries to drivers are very rare.

Unlike other forms of motor sport aside from touring car racing, race trucks look like their road-going counterparts and conform to regulations to ensure that major components used are the same.

== North America ==
=== Canada ===
In Canada, particularly in Quebec, semi-truck drag racing is held in a side-by-side format, including uphill races. Competitions may feature both tractor units without trailers (bobtail) and trucks pulling loaded trailers. The format is commonly associated with races held at events such as Challenge 255 in Baie-du-Febvre.

=== United States ===
As a sanctioned sport it began as ATRA (American Truck Racing Association), founded by Nashville promoter Jim Donoho. The inaugural race condemned by the National Highway Traffic Safety Administration (NHTSA), which had sent a telegram urging Donaho to call off the race, as well as by Goodyear Tire, General Motors, Cooper Tires, the American Trucking Association, the Motor Vehicle Manufacturers Association, and by Heavy Duty Trucking magazine, because none of the competitors had racing experience, the use of non-racing tires, and the size of the vehicles. Donaho elected to hold the race as scheduled, and was able to sell ATRA to N. Linn Henndershott in 1982 and it became the Great American Truck Racing circuit. The races were run on dirt and paved ovals mostly in the Eastern United States. The trucks used in the beginning were working trucks with tandem rear axles, using street tires, and yet speeds of 150 mph (241 km/h) were still attained on the front straight at Pocono Raceway, and the closed course record of 132 mph (212 km/h) was set in qualifying at Texas World Speedway by Charlie Baker on March 21, 1982.

When the series was bought by Glenn Donnelly of DIRT (Drivers Independent Race Tracks) in 1986, the GATR trucks became highly modified with the bodies being cut and lowered, losing the tag axle and shedding more than 2,000 pounds in weight. The last sanctioned GATR race in the U.S. was in July 1993 at Rolling Wheels Raceway in Elbridge, New York.

The Bandit Big Rig Series debuted in the United States in 2017, giving America its first truck race series since GATR in 1993. The Minimizer Bandit Big Rig Series had 13 races in his first (2017) season, with historic tracks Hickory Motor Speedway and Greenville-Pickens Speedway included on the schedule.

=== Mexico ===
Mexico also started its own truck racing version called Tractocamiones, which ran from 1992 to 2000 and was revived in 2015 as Campeonato Tractocamiones Freightliner. Notable international drivers that have raced in the series include former Champ Car race winner Michel Jourdain Jr., former F1 driver Allen Berg, Indy 500 Rookie of the year Bernard Jourdain, the late Carlos Pardo, Rubén Pardo, Jorge Goeters, Carlos Contreras, Abraham Calderón and Jimmy Morales among others.

== Europe ==
The FIA European Truck Racing Championship was created in 1985.

=== Britain ===
In Britain, in the last few years, the profile of truck racing has increased; there are currently over 30 teams regularly compete. Britain’s top truck racing series is The British Truck Racing Championship (BTRC). The sporting regulations came under the control of the Fédération Internationale de l'Automobile (FIA) later, to ensure that the vehicles conform to the layout and original style of the truck, whilst defining the safety standards required to race.

The makes of truck currently represented in truck racing cover most of the common marques over the last 20 years.

The regulations allow for trucks to compete in two classes, so trucks with less sophisticated engine management systems, suspension, and braking systems can compete effectively.

The organising body for truck racing in the United Kingdom is The British Truck Racing Association founded in 1984. The British Championships and race events are organised by the British Automobile Racing Club.

== South America ==
=== Brazil ===
In Brazil, the Fórmula Truck had been held between 1996 and 2017, folding in May 2017 (after only 3 races that year). It featured several factory teams. Starting in 2017, the Copa Truck was created, replacing the former Formula Truck. Almost every driver and factory teams of the former series entered in Copa Truck.

== Asia ==
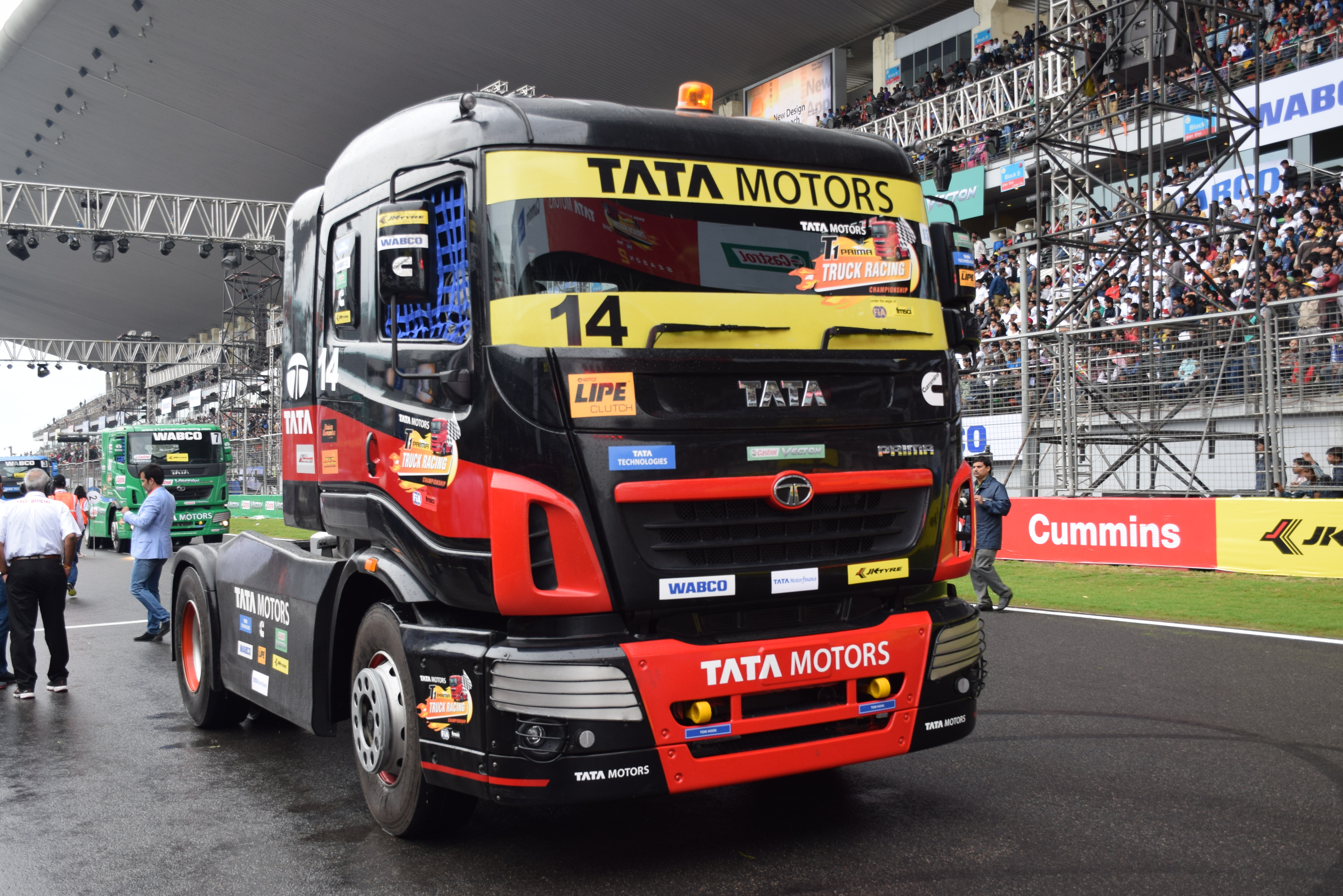
Tata Prima T1 at Buddh International Circuit

=== India ===
T1 Prima Truck Racing Championship is a truck racing championship in India by Tata Motors. This was also on the calendar of Fédération Internationale de l'Automobile (FIA) and Federation of Motor Sports Clubs of India (FMSCI). This event was held 23 March 2014 at Buddh International Circuit, Greater Noida.

== Other formats ==
Trucks also are very popular in rally raid as a separate category (Group T5) for example in Dakar Rally and others rally raids.

In France, trucks are very common in different types of off-road racing, like the camion cross (trucks cross in English), similar to rallycross but with trucks instead. Also in Europe is the Trial camion, (truck trials), like Motorcycle trials but with trucks.

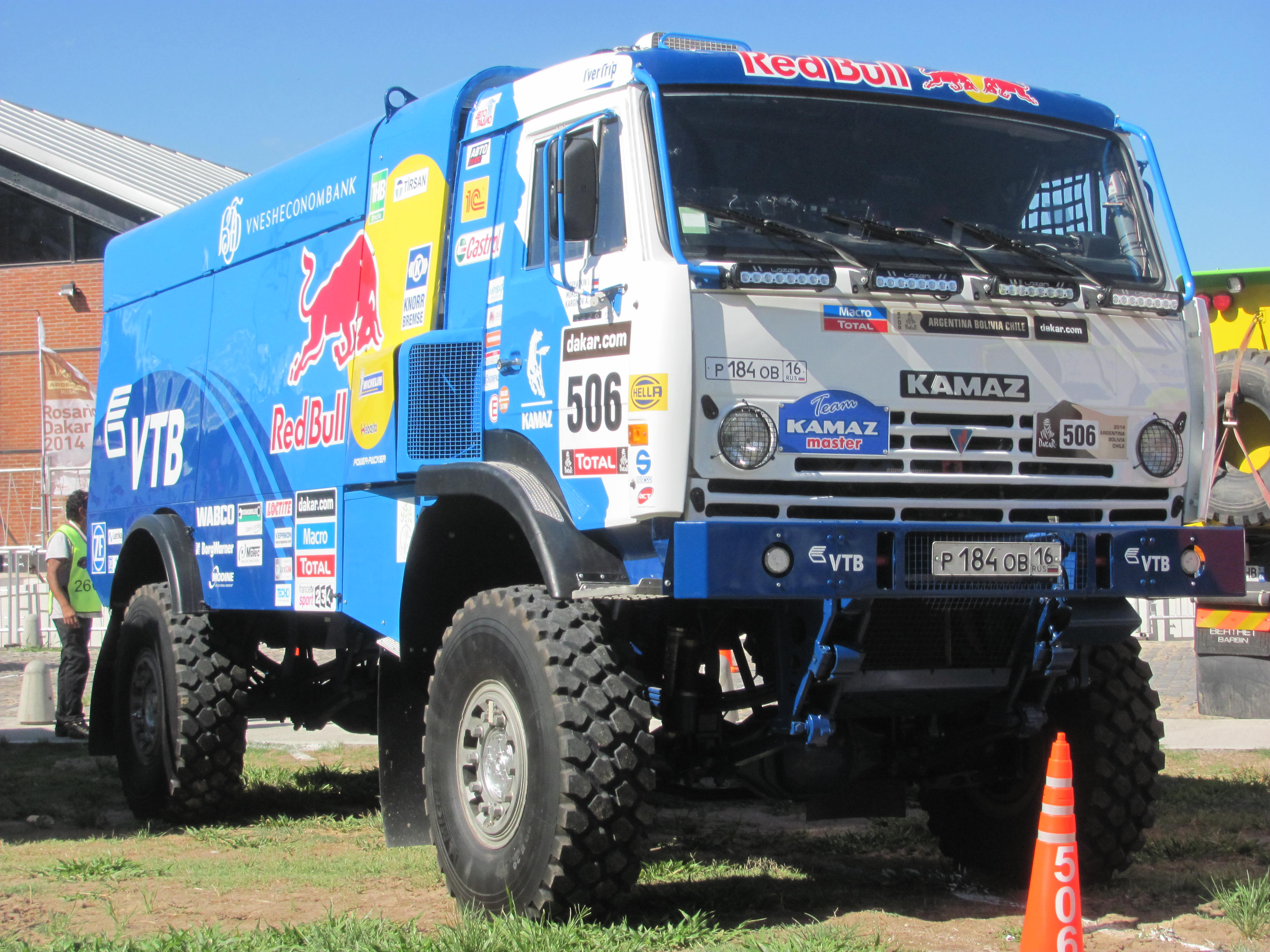
Kamaz 4326 modified for Dakar Rally

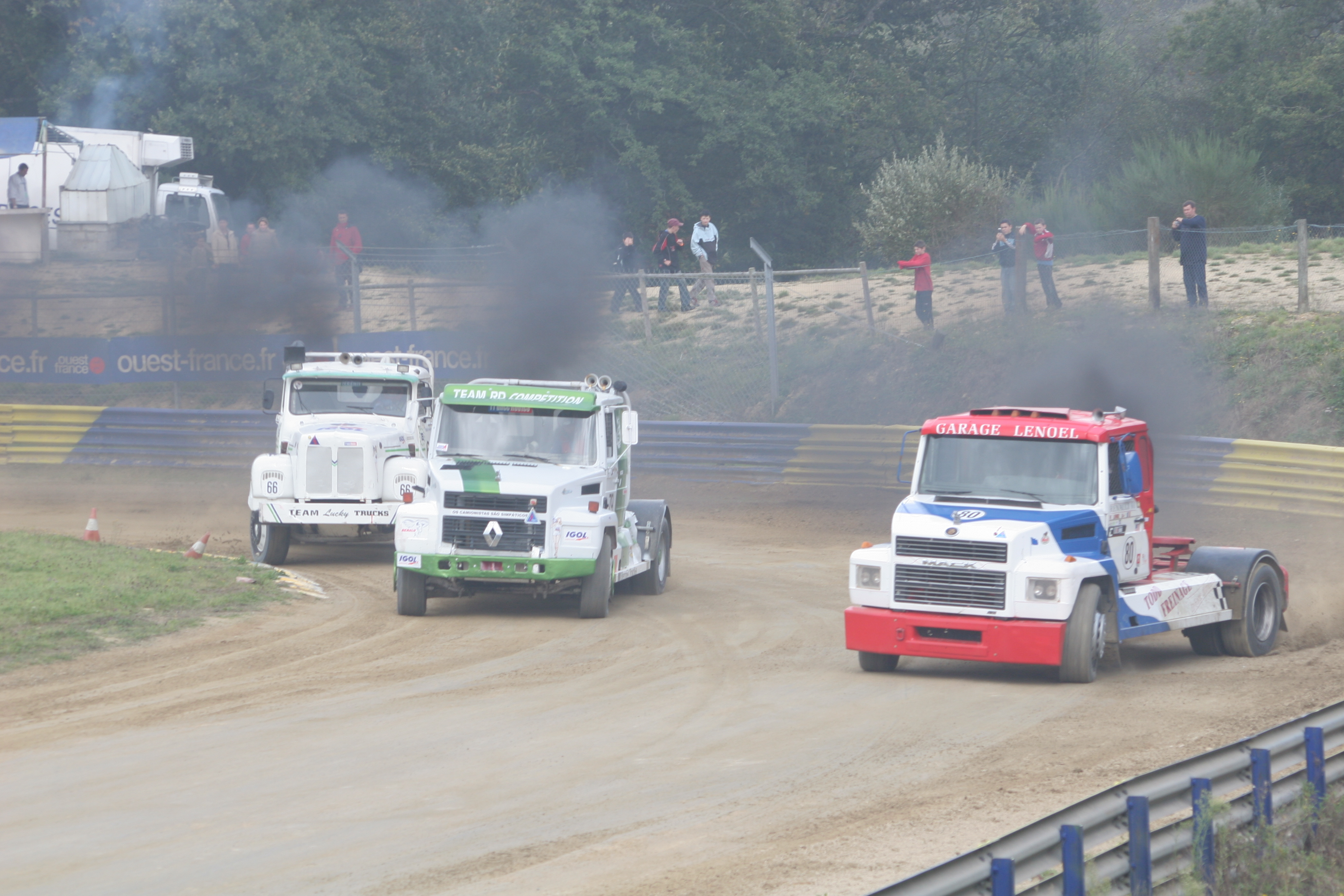
Coupe de France de camion cross at Kerlabo

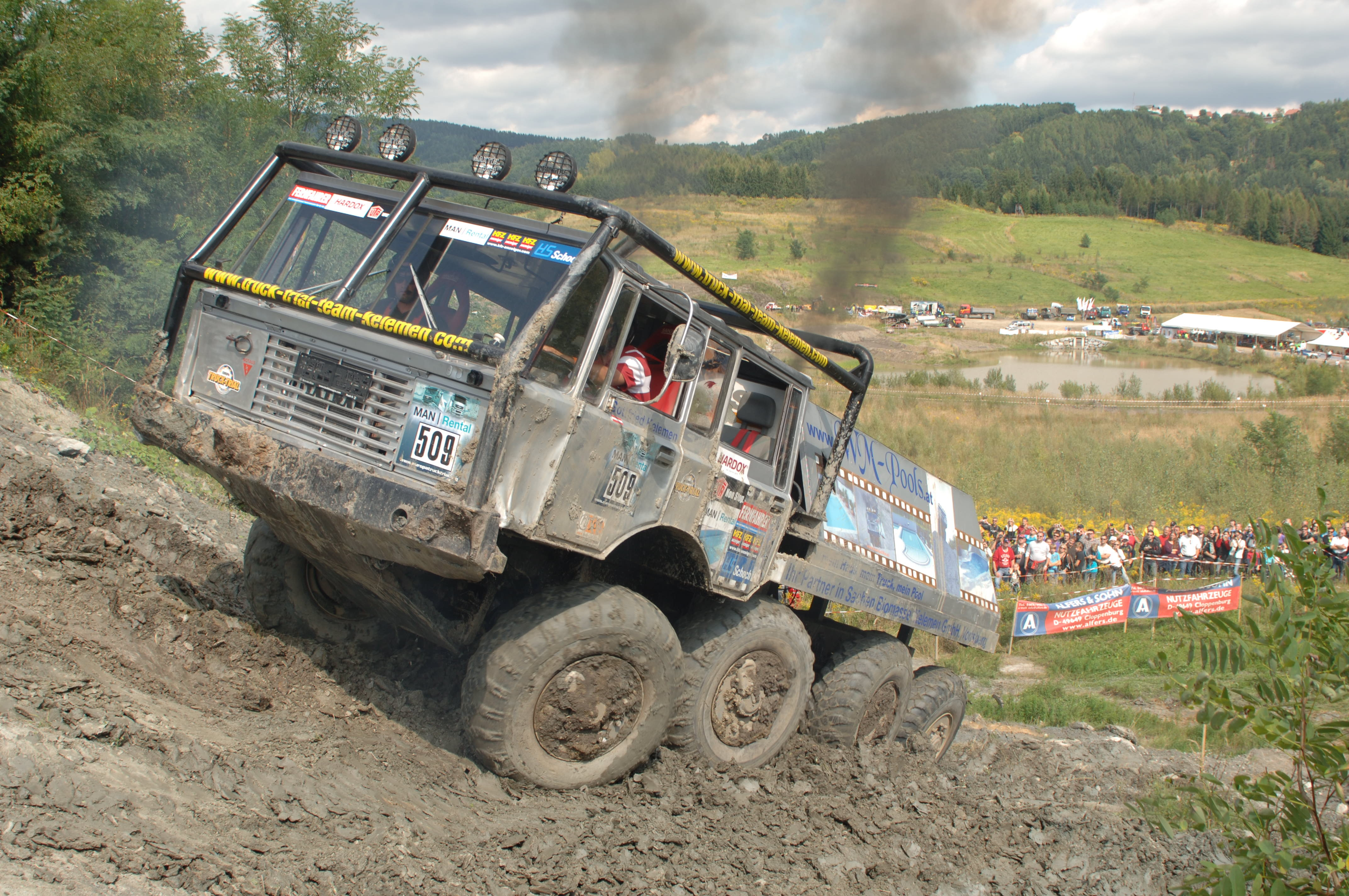
Truck trials in Austria

== Race truck manufacturers ==
- DAF Trucks
- Edwin Foden, Sons & Co.
- ERF
- Ford
- Freightliner Trucks
- Hino Motors
- Hyundai Motor Company
- Iveco
- Kamaz
- KrAZ
- Mack
- MAN SE
- MAZ
- Mercedes-Benz
- Renault Trucks
- Scammell
- Scania AB
- Seddon Atkinson
- Sisu Auto
- Tata Motors
- Volkswagen Commercial Vehicles
- Volvo
- ZiL

== See also ==
- Monster truck
- Fórmula Truck
- Copa Truck
- T1 Prima Truck Racing Championship
- Cargo bike racing, bicycle race using cargo bikes
