= Formula 4 =

Junior level open-wheel racing car category

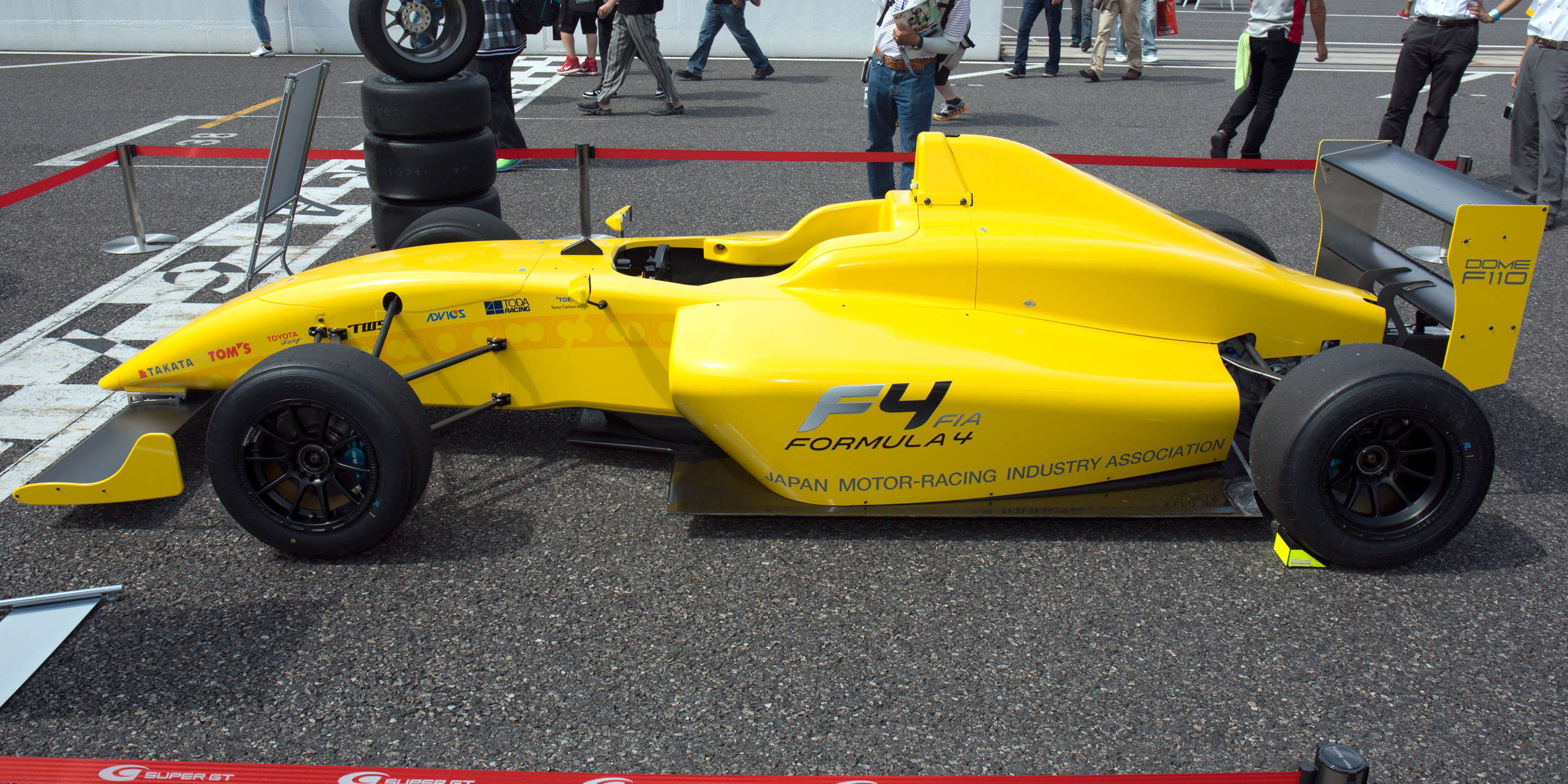
Dome F110 on display in 2014

FIA Formula 4, also known as F4, is an open-wheel racing car category intended for junior drivers. There is no global championship; instead, individual nations or regions can host their own championships in compliance with a universal set of rules and specifications.

The category was created in March 2013 by the Fédération Internationale de l'Automobile (FIA)—the International sanctioning and administrative body for motorsport—after approval by the World Motor Sport Council as an entry-level category for young drivers, bridging the gap between karting and Formula 3. The series is a part of the FIA Global Pathway. Former Formula One driver Gerhard Berger was appointed as the FIA Single-Seater Commission president to oversee the creation of the category as a response to declining interest in national Formula 3 championships due to rising costs and alternate pathways to Formula One such as the then Formula Renault and GP2 and GP3 Series, which had seen several national Formula 3 championships discontinued. In the place of the expensive categories, a number of separate categories running under the Formula 4 name had been created, for example, the British-based former BRDC Formula 4. There was no commonality between the cars from country to country.

Initially, these Formula 4 championships began in 2014 as a single-make category, before the regulations were opened to multiple chassis and engine manufacturers. Each championship uses a single make of engine, with the regulations mandating a 1.4 litre capacity and capping the maximum power output at 160 bhp (119.3 kW), higher than Formula Ford and lower than Formula Renault. The engines are equalized so that no one Formula 4 championship is faster than the others, with the long-term aim of bringing the cost of competing down to under €100,000 per year.

In practice, costs for competitors considerably exceed this goal; the cost of participating in the 2022 French Formula 4 series (including all equipment) was €118,000, excluding tax. Costs in other F4 championships can be considerably higher, with one estimate of the costs of a realistic attempt at the now-defunct German F4 series championship in excess of €350,000.

== Homologated chassis manufacturers ==
To become eligible for FIA Formula 4, the chassis must meet the FIA homologation requirements respecting technical and commercial regulations. Four chassis manufacturers have been approved by the FIA: Tatuus, Mygale, Dome and Ligier.

=== First generation chassis ===
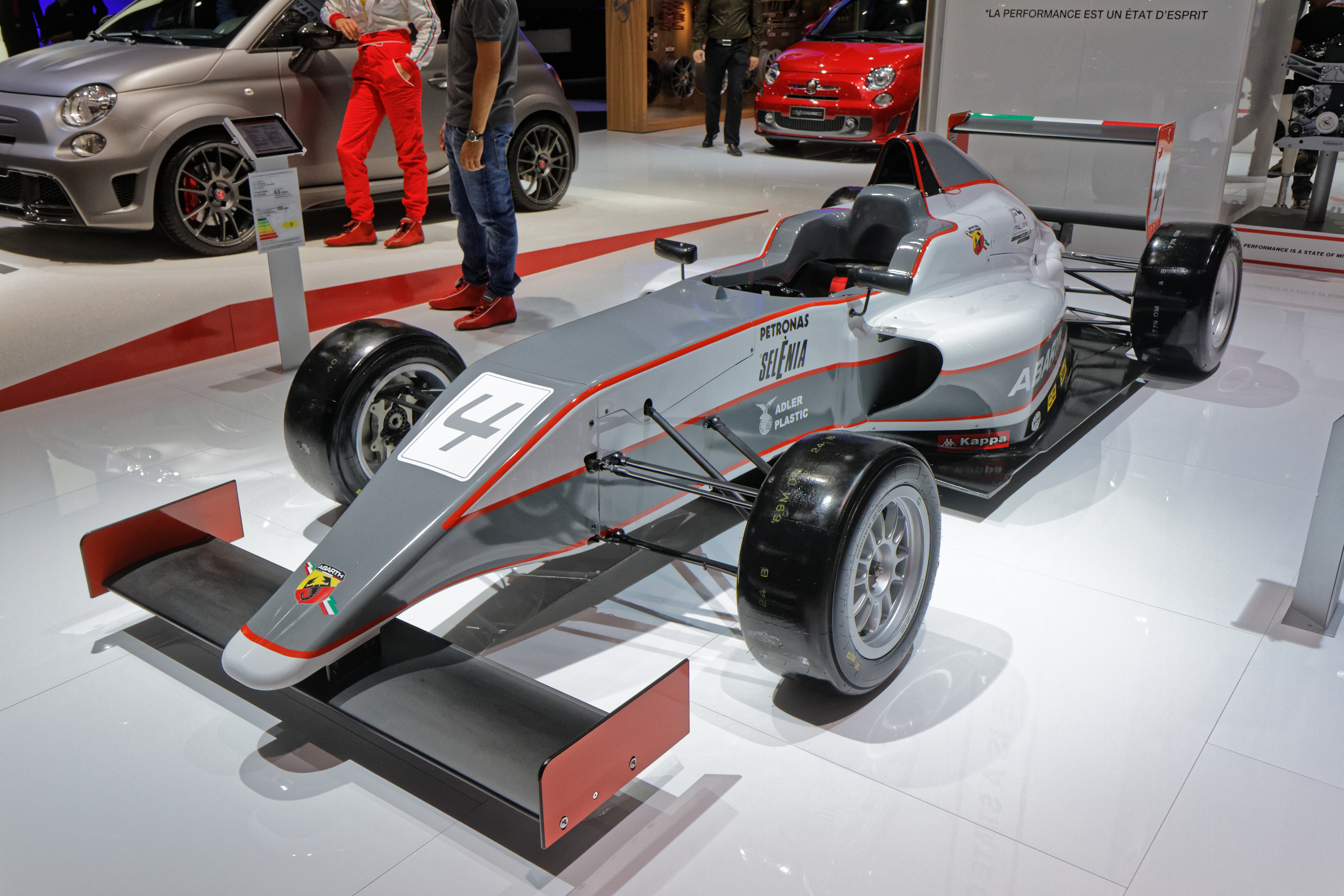
Tatuus F4-T014 (2014–2021)

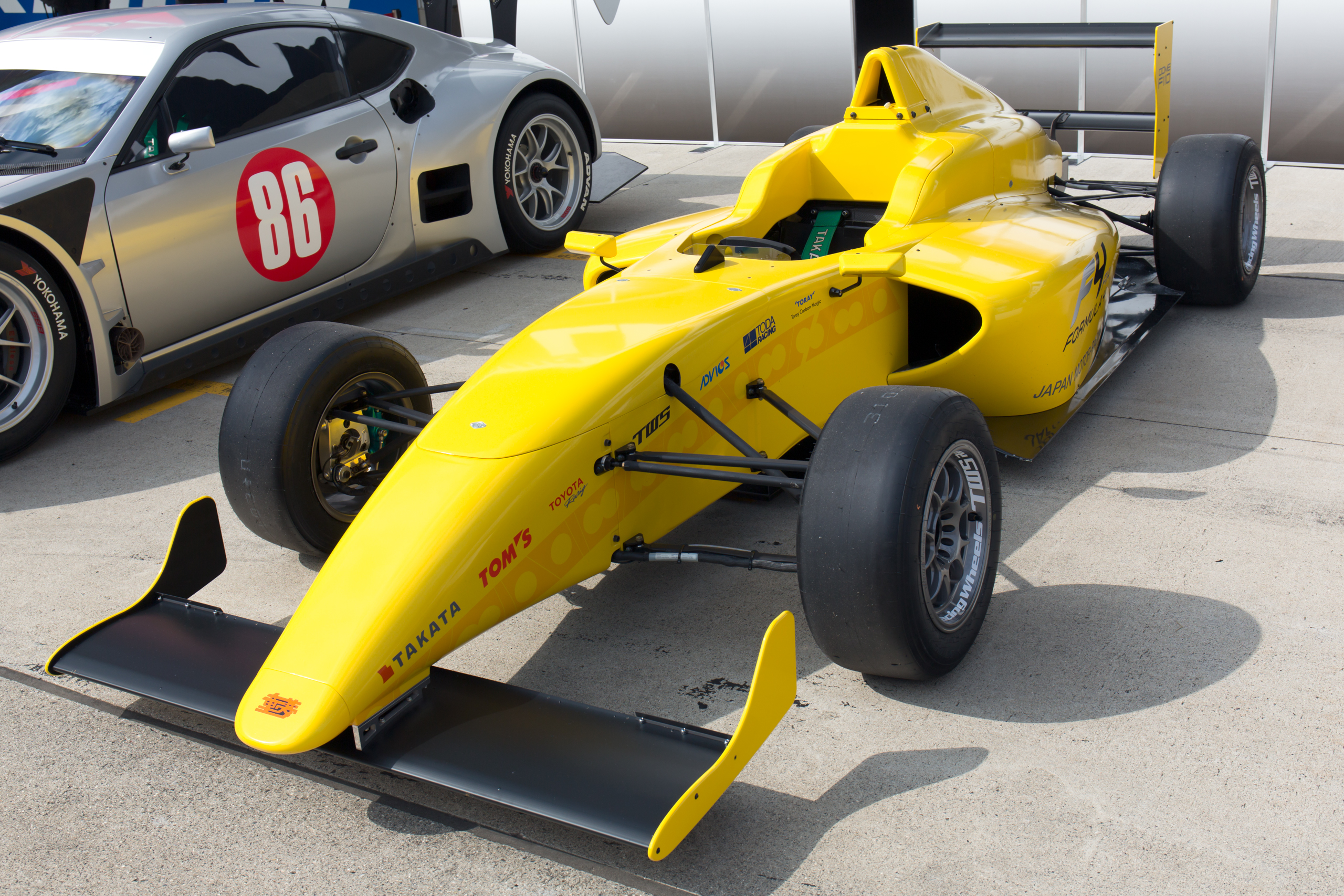
Dome F110 (2015–2023)

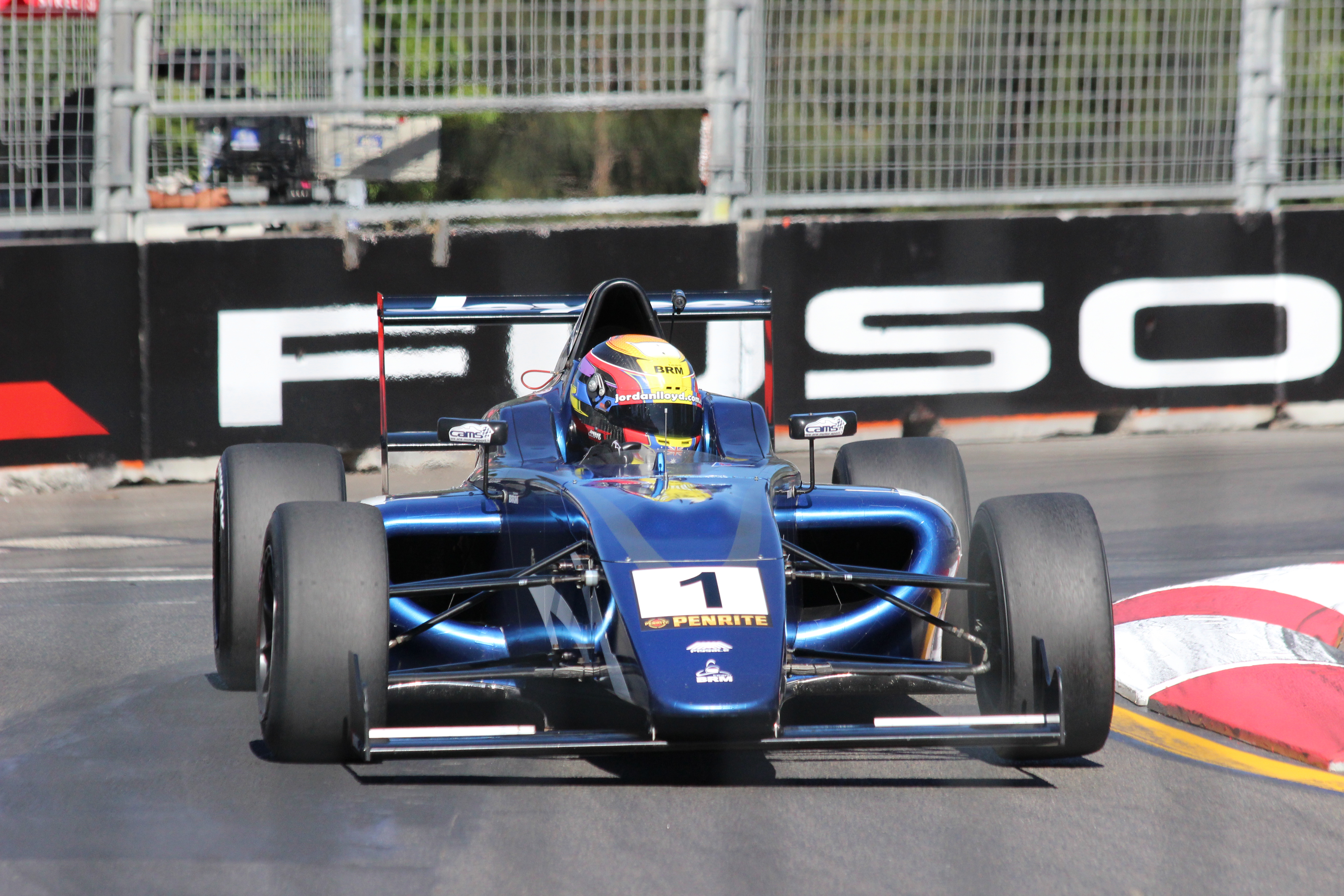
Mygale M14-F4 (2015–2023)

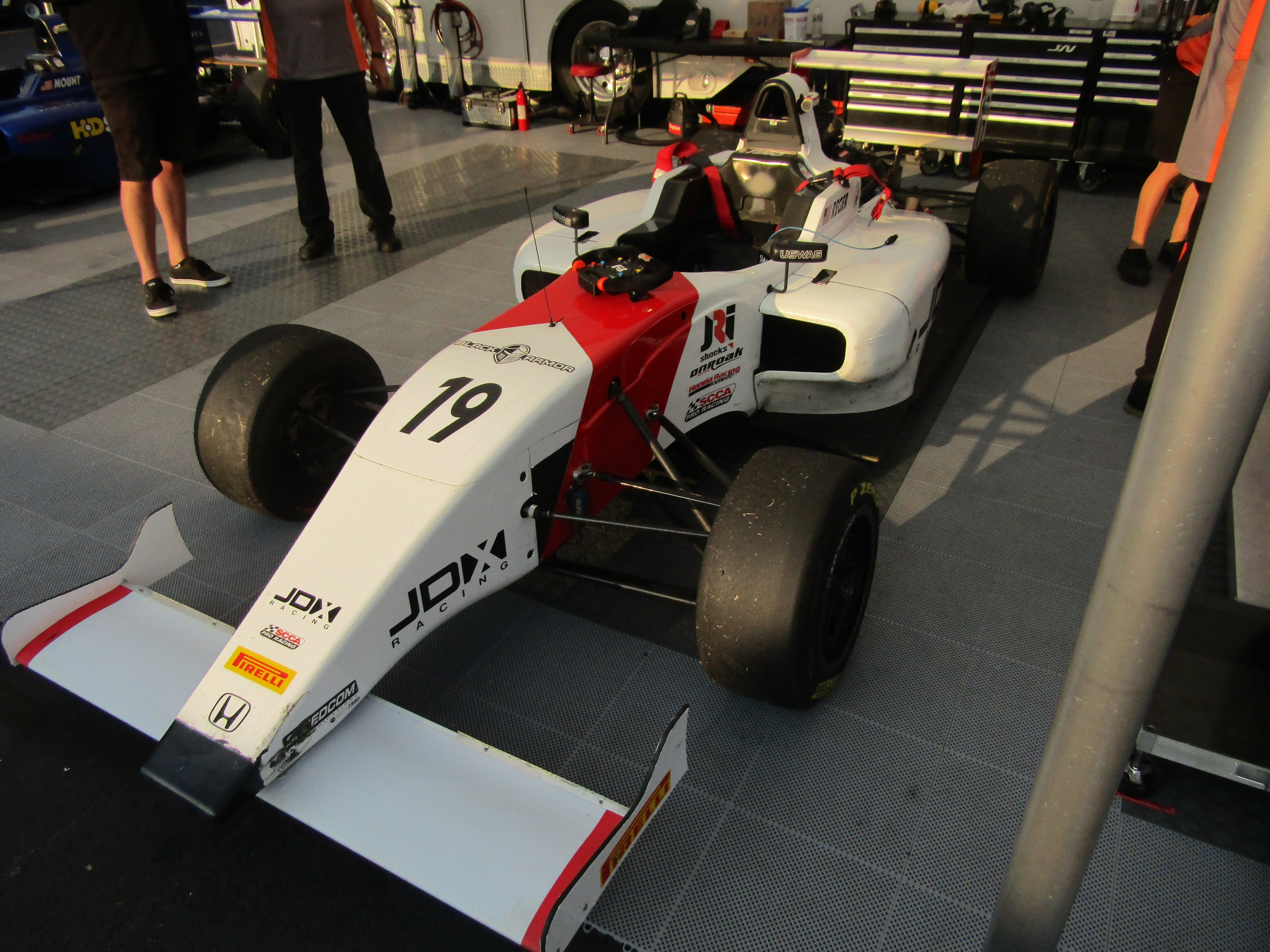
Ligier JS F4 (2016–2023)

=== Second generation chassis ===
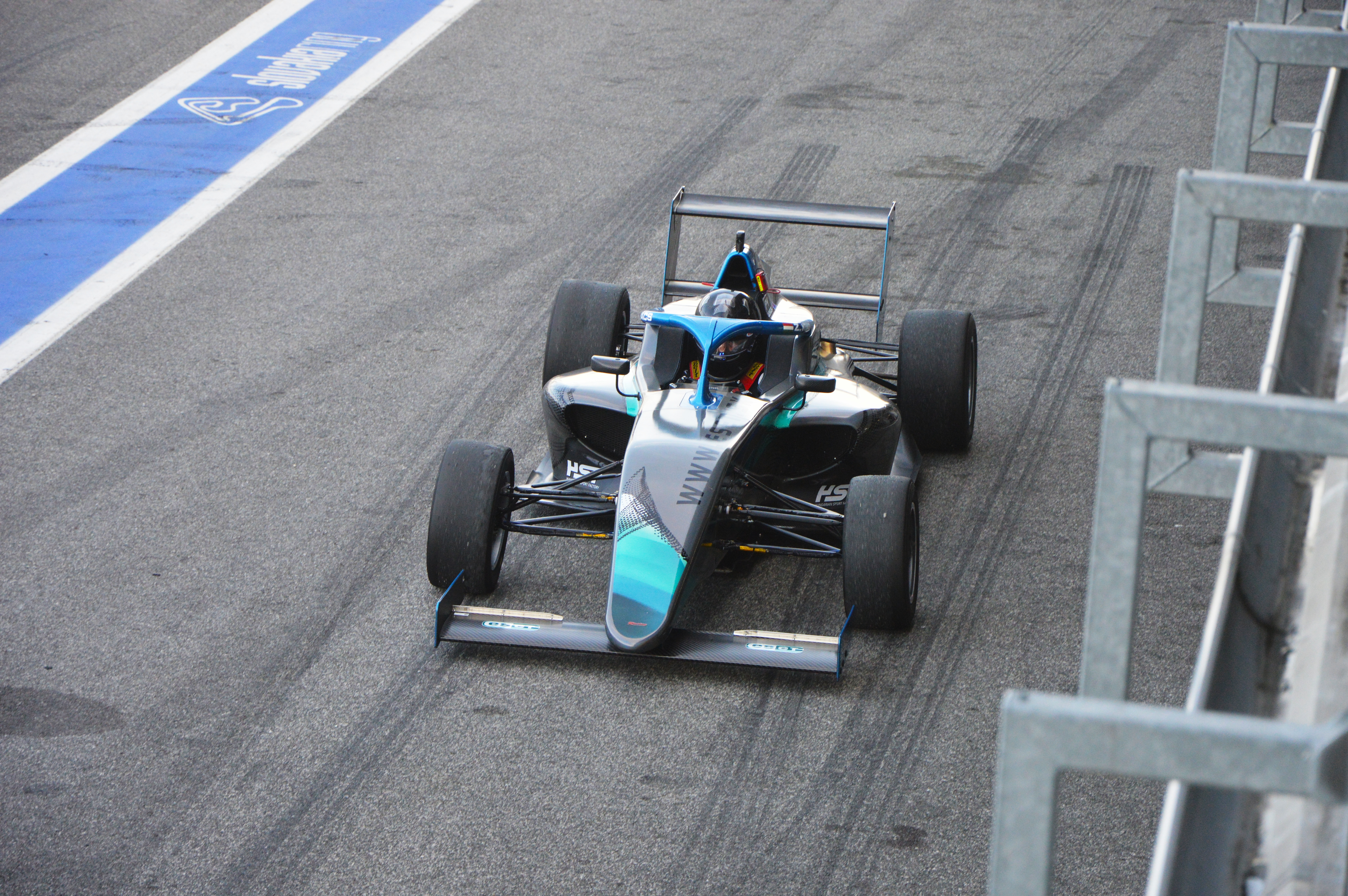
Tatuus F4-T421 (2021–present)

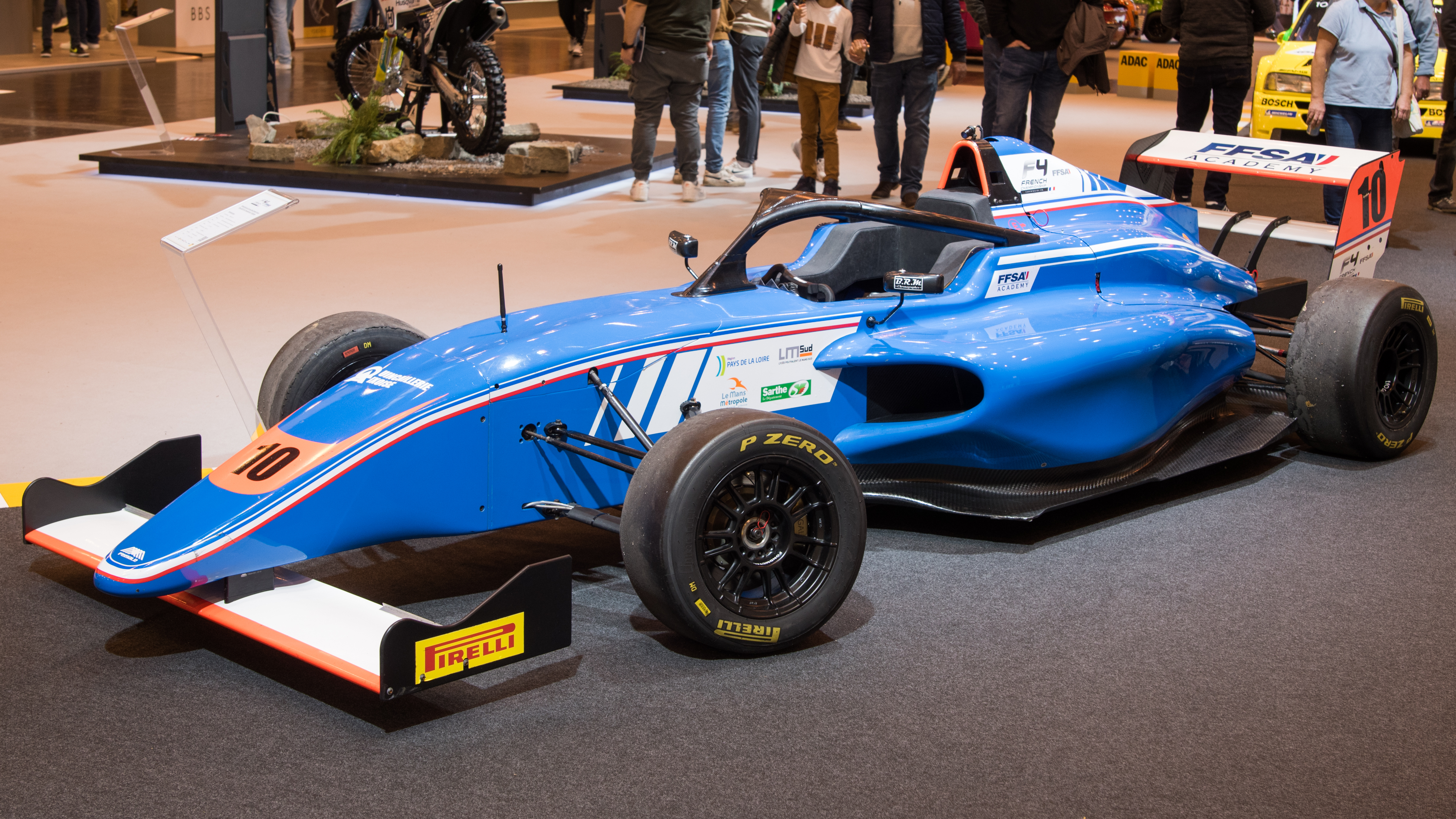
Mygale M21-F4 (2022–present)

== Homologated engines ==
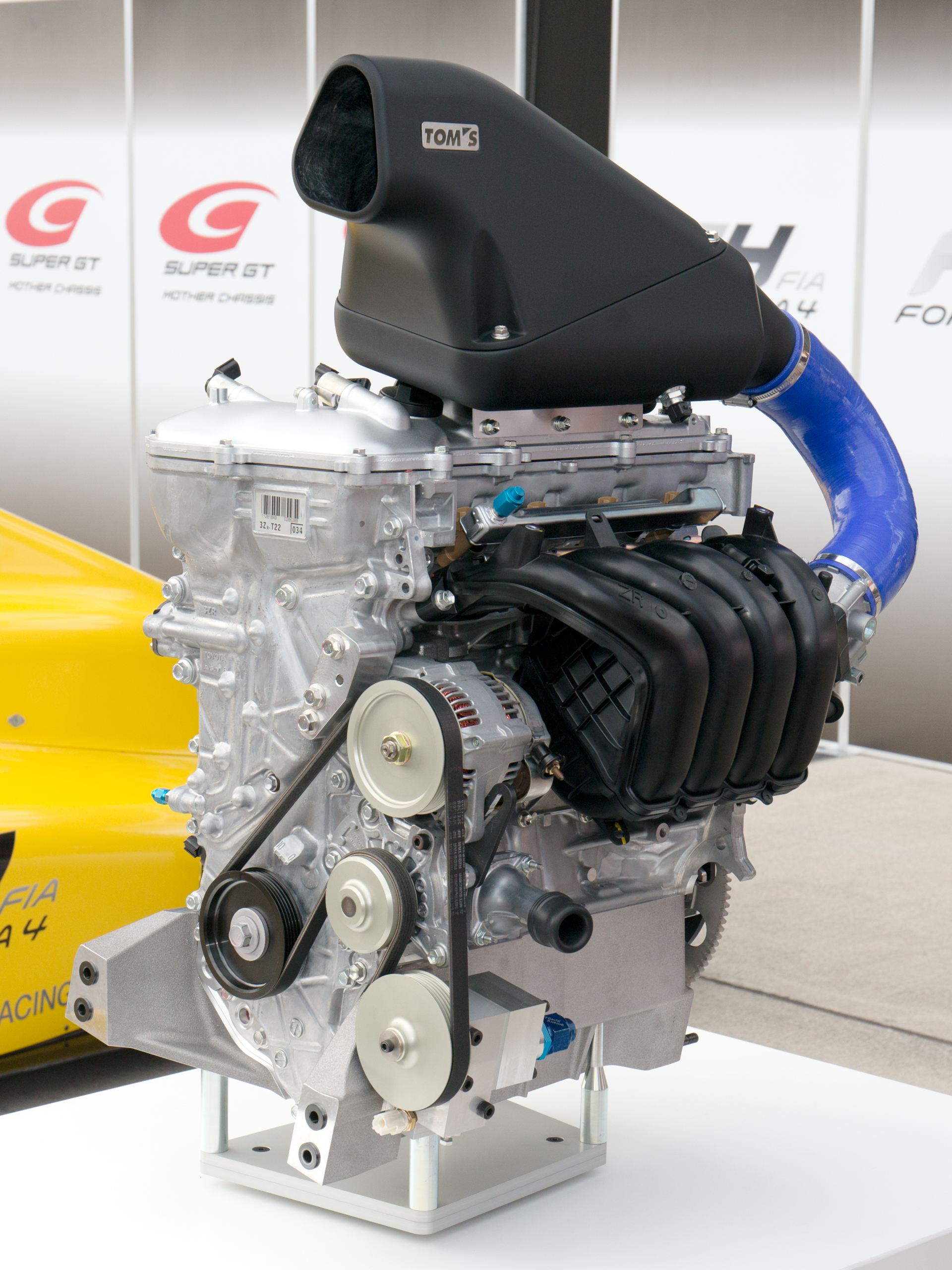
Toyota 3ZR engine for the Japanese championship

To become an eligible FIA Formula 4 engine, the engine must meet the homologation requirements. According to the homologation requirements a FIA Formula 4 engine must last at least 10,000 km and have a maximum purchase price of €14000. According to the FIA Formula 4 technical regulations only four cylinder engines are allowed. Both normally aspirated and turbocharged engines are permitted, with an absolute maximum power output of 140 kW. The engine displacement is unlimited. Currently seven engines are homologated for use in the FIA Formula 4.

| Manufacturer | Abarth | Ford | Geely | Honda | Renault | TOM's-Toyota | Ligier |
| Engine name | 1.4L FTJ | 1.6L EcoBoost | G-Power JLD-4G20 | Honda K20C2 | 2.0L F4R | 3ZR | Ligier Storm V4 |
|---|---|---|---|---|---|---|---|
| Engine type | inline 4 | inline 4 | inline 4 | inline 4 | inline 4 | inline 4 | V4 |
| Displacement | 1,400cc | 1,600cc | 2,000cc | 2,000cc | 2,000cc | 2,000cc | 1650cc |
| Valvetrain | | DOHC | CVVT DOHC | i-VTEC DOHC | VVT DOHC | VVT DOHC | |
| Engine management | Magneti Marelli | Life Racing F88GDI4 | | GEMS Honda GDi80 D | Life Racing F88RS | | |
| Lubrication | Dry sump | Dry sump | | | | | Dry sump |
| Cooling | Water and air cooler | Water and air cooler | | | Water and air cooler | | |
| Transmission | Sequential Sadev six speed | Sequential Sadev six speed | Sequential Sadev six speed | Sequential Sadev six speed | Sequential Sadev six speed | Sequential Toda Racing six speed | Sequential Sadev six speed (SLR75) |
| Fuel | Panta Racing Fuel | | | Sunoco | | | |

== Performance ==
Formula 4 is the first step out of karting on the FIA Global Pathway, and by design has the least performance of any of the cars in it.

Compared to road-legal supercars, Formula 4 cars are less accelerative and have a much lower top speed of approximately 240 km/h; most modern supercars are capable of in excess of 300 km/h. The F4 cars have far superior braking and cornering capabilities, particularly in high-speed corners where the aerodynamic downforce of the Formula 4 cars has the most effect.

According to official information from the F1 Academy, the Tatuus race car (virtually identical to the one used in some F4 series) has a peak lateral cornering acceleration of about 2.0g, far in excess of a typical (non-sporting) road car which peaks at less than 1g, but considerably less than Formula 3 cars (which peak around 2.5g).

To give some idea of the gap between F4 and F1 performance levels, the fastest qualifying lap for a 2023 F4 round at the Silverstone GP circuit was 2:01.651; the pole lap in the 2024 British Grand Prix in an F1 car was 1:25.819.

However, F4 cars still lap considerably faster than most production-derived racing categories. The F4 pole time is about 2 seconds faster than the Porsche Carrera Cup lap record and about 10 seconds faster than the TCR Touring Car lap record.

== Active FIA-sanctioned championships ==
=== FIA Motorsport Games ===
A Formula 4 race forms part of the FIA Motorsport Games, a biennial event featuring a variety of motorsport disciplines including karting, drifting, rallying, and e-sports as well as circuit racing.

=== FIA-sanctioned national/regional championships ===
As of 2025, the FIA recognises thirteen F4 championships. These championships are held to Formula 4 regulations and approved by the FIA as the national Formula 4 series. Drivers participating in these series can receive FIA Super Licence points, which are required to drive in Formula One. For a series to be eligible for Super Licence points, a season must be held over at least five events at a minimum of three circuits, according to FIA Appendix L.

| Years | Name | Country/Region | Chassis | Engine | Note |
|---|---|---|---|---|---|
| 2014–present | Italian F4 Championship | Italy | Tatuus F4-T014 (2014–2021); Tatuus F4-T421 (2022–present) | Abarth 414TF 1.4L (2014–present) | Replaced Formula Abarth. |
| 2015–present | F4 Japanese Championship | Japan | Dome F110 (2014–2023); Toray Carbon Magic MCS4-24 (2024-) | TOM'S-Toyota 2.0L (2015–present) | Organised by GT–Association to support Super GT. |
| 2015–present | F4 British Championship | United Kingdom; Netherlands | Mygale M14-F4 (2015–2021); Tatuus F4-T421 (2022–present) | Ford 1.6L EcoBoost (2015–2021); Abarth 414TF 1.4L (2022–present) | Replaced the British Formula Ford Championship. |
| 2015–present | F4 Chinese Championship | China | Mygale M14-F4 (2015–2023); Mygale M21-F4 (2024-) | Geely G-Power JLD-4G20 (2.0L) (2015–present) | Organised by Narcar International Racing Development Co., Ltd. to host the China Formula Grand Prix. |
| 2015–present | NACAM Formula 4 Championship | Mexico | Mygale M14-F4 (2015–2023); Tatuus F4-T421 (2024-) | Ford 1.6L EcoBoost (2015–2023); Abarth 414TF 1.4L (2024-) | Sanctioned by Mexican ASN — OMDAI, organised by local motorsport promoters Copa NotiAuto and the Mexican Federation of Competitive Motorsport (FEMADAC). |
| 2016–present | F4 Spanish Championship | Spain; Portugal | Tatuus F4-T014 (2016–2021); Tatuus F4-T421 (2022–present) | Abarth 414TF 1.4L (2016–present) | Established by the Spanish ASN — RFEDA and Koiranen GP. For the 2025 season, a winter series was created, known as Eurocup-4 SWC. |
| 2016–present | Formula 4 United States Championship | United States; Canada | Ligier JS F4 (2016–2023); Ligier JS F422 (2024-) | Honda K20C2 (2.0L) (2016–2023); Ligier Storm (2024-) | Organised by SCCA Pro Racing (Sports Car Club of America) and United States ASN — ACCUS. |
| 2016–present | Formula 4 South East Asia Championship | Malaysia; Thailand | Mygale M14-F4 (2016–2019); Tatuus F4-T421 (2023,2025-) | Renault F4R (2.0L) (2016–2019); Abarth 414TF 1.4L (2023, 2025-) | The inaugural season was held over 2016 and 2017. The COVID-19 pandemic put a momentary stop to the championship in 2020, but in 2023, the championship was revived under a new promoter Top Speed Shanghai Ltd . |
| 2018–present | F4 French Championship | France; Belgium | Mygale M14-F4 (2018–2021); Mygale M21-F4 (2022–present) | Renault F4R (2.0L) (2018–2019); Renault HR13 (1.3L) (2020–2021); Alpine (2022–present) | Replaces the previous French F4 Championship which was a Formula Renault 1.6 series. Organised by Fédération Française du Sport Automobile. |
| 2022–present | F4 Brazilian Championship | Brazil | Tatuus F4-T421 (2022–present) | Abarth 414TF 1.4L (2022–present) | Organized by Brazilian Auto Racing Confederation and Vicar, the Stock Car Pro Series promotor. |
| 2023–present | F4 Indian Championship | India | Mygale M21-F4 (2023–present) | Alpine 1.3L Turbocharged Engine (2023–present) | Supports the Formula Regional Indian Championship and the Indian Racing League. |
| 2023–present | Formula 4 CEZ Championship | Austria; Czech Republic; Hungary; Slovakia | Tatuus F4-T421 (2023–present) | Abarth 414TF 1.4L (2023–present) | Organized by the Automobile Club of the Czech Republic and Křenek Motorsport, the ESET V4 Cup Series promotor. |
| 2024–present | F4 Saudi Arabian Championship | Saudi Arabia; Bahrain | Tatuus F4-T421 (2024-present) | Autotecnica 414TF 1.4L (2024-present) | First held in 2024. Operated by Altawkilat Meritus GP. |
| 2025 | FIA F4 World Cup | Macau | Mygale M21-F4 (2025) | Alpine (2025) | An F4 category was added to the Macau Grand Prix for 2025. |

== Active non-FIA-sanctioned championships ==
There are a number of active championships that follow the current and former F4 specifications, but are not considered official F4 championships by the FIA.

| Years | Name | Country/Region | Chassis | Engine | Note |
|---|---|---|---|---|---|
| 2015–2019, 2024–present | AU4 Australian Championship | Australia | Mygale M14-F4 (2015–2019, 2025–); Tatuus F4-T421 (2024–) | Ford 1.6L EcoBoost (2015–2019, 2025); Abarth 414TF 1.4L (2024–) | The CAMS Jayco Australian Formula 4 Championship ran from 2015 to 2019. Revived by China-based Top Speed in 2024, the series added a Mygale M14-F4 class in 2025 and adopted the new name AU4 Australian Championship. |
| 2015–2019, 2025 | SMP F4 Championship | Russia | Tatuus F4-T014 (2015–2019); Tatuus F4-T421 (2025–present) | Abarth 414TF 1.4L (2015–2019, 2025–) | The SMP F4 Championship was held from 2016 to 2019 before losing its FIA certification. In 2025, the series returned. |
| 2016–present | UAE4 Series | United Arab Emirates; Qatar | Tatuus F4-T014 (2016–2021); Tatuus F4-T421 (2022–present) | Abarth 414TF 1.4L (2016–present) | Organized by Emirates Motorsport Organization (EMSO) and Top Speed. Formerly known as F4 UAE Championship and F4 Middle East Championship. The series lost its FIA certification and was renamed as UAE4 Series in 2026. |
| 2017–present | Nordic 4 Championship | Denmark; Sweden | Mygale M14-F4 (2017–present) | Renault F4R (2.0L) (2017–present) | Organised by Dansk Automobil Sports Union. From 2017 to 2023, the series was called Danish Formula 4 Championship. In 2024, the series was renamed to Nordic 4 and lost its FIA certification. |
| 2022–present | GB4 Championship | United Kingdom | Tatuus F4-T014 (2022–2024); Tatuus MSV GB4-025 (2025–) | Abarth 414TF 1.4L (2022–2024); Mountune 2.0L (2025–) | Organized by MSV in the collaboration with British Racing Drivers' Club. It requires lower financial contribution than F4 British Championship, which is certified by FIA. |
| 2023–present | E4 Championship | Europe | Tatuus F4-T421 (2023–present) | Autotecnica 414TF 1.4L (2023–present) | Organized by ACI Sport and WSK Promotions. Renamed as E4 Championship prior to the 2025 season. |
| 2023–present | F1 Academy | International | Modified Tatuus F4-T421 (2023–present) | Autotecnica 414TF 1.4L (2023–present) | All-female racing series run by Formula One since 2023. Despite not being FIA-certified, it does award super licence points. |
| 2023–present | Formula Winter Series | Spain | Tatuus F4-T421 (2023–present) | Autotecnica 414TF 1.4L (2023–present) | Winter series held in Spain and Portugal. |
| 2024–present | Formula Trophy UAE | United Arab Emirates | Tatuus F4-T421 (2024–present) | Abarth 414TF 1.4L (2024–present) | Organized by Emirates Motorsport Organization (EMSO) and Top Speed. Spinoff of the UAE4 Series. |
| 2025–present | Formula 4 Thailand | Thailand | Tatuus F4-T421 (2025) | Abarth 414TF 1.4L (2025) | Organized by Pakelo Lubricants Thailand. |
| 2025–present | Ligier Junior Formula Championship | United States | Ligier JS F416 | Honda K20C1 | Originally named the "Ligier JS F4 Series" in 2024, and was renamed for 2025. Feeder/development series to the F4 United States Championship. |
| 2026–present | Formula IDN Racing Series | Indonesia | Ligier JS F422 (2026) | Alpine 1.3L Turbocharged Engine (2026) | Supported and organized by Mandalika Grand Prix Association (MGPA), and InJourney. The series is scheduled to hold its inaugural race in Q3 2026. |

== Former Formula 4 championships ==
=== Canada CASC Formula 4 ===
CASC Formula 4 was based on a non-FIA formulae, instead using 750cc motorcycle engines. Chassis were typically locally produced such as Xpit and Gamma and the cars were fuelled by methanol. It was created in 1974 and was popular in the CASC Ontario region at club level only. It no longer holds its own championship, instead running as part of the 'Formula Libre' category in the RaceOntario Championships.

=== Formula Beat ===
Formula Beat was created in 1993 as JAF Japan Formula 4, and was renamed in 2023. It continues to run but does not follow F4 specifications, with competitors allowed to use Formula 3 chassis as well.

=== BRDC Formula 4 Championship ===
The BRDC Formula 4 Championship was an entry-level motorsport series based in the United Kingdom which began in 2013. Run by the British Racing Drivers' Club and MotorSport Vision, the series used identical cars built by Ralph Firman Racing and engines from Ford, before switching to FIA Formula 4 regulations in 2015, using the Tatuus F4-T014 chassis. Although run to the FIA's regulations, it was not recognised by the FIA as an official Formula 4 championship. In 2016, the series was upgraded and renamed the BRDC British Formula 3 Championship, now known as GB3, which runs to Formula Regional specifications.

=== Fórmula Academy Sudamericana ===
The Fórmula Academy Sudamericana, previously known as Fórmula 4 Sudamericana, was a Formula 4 racing class that debuted in 2014. The class used the same Signatech chassis and Fiat engines used previously in the Brazilian-based Formula Future Fiat. The series folded after the 2019 season.

=== F4 Argentina Championship ===
A single season of the F4 Argentina Championship was held in 2021.

=== ADAC Formula 4 Championship ===
The ADAC Formula 4 Championship was held from 2015 to 2022. On 3 December 2022, ADAC announced that ADAC Formula 4 would not be organized for the 2023 season, with the focus on placing the German junior drivers in the French F4 Championship instead. The main reason for the decision was the low number of participating drivers due to the high costs compared to other Formula 4 championships.

=== Formula Academy Finland ===
Formula Academy Finland is a racing series based in Finland. Its first season was 2018. Formula Academy Finland uses same Tatuus-Abarth FIA Formula 4 car as ADAC Formula 4, Italian Formula 4 Championship and several other series. The series, however, is not approved by the FIA. There are plans to apply for Finnish Championship status for 2019 season. The series is organized by Koiranen GP. More recently as of 2020, the series has run alongside older F3 chassis as a part of the Finnish Championship Series' category Formula Open Finland.

=== Fórmula 4 Chile ===
The series organized by the Campeonato Nacional de Carreras Federado uses the Tatuus FA010 chassis from the Formula Abarth, one of the predecessors of the Formula 4 car. The series was never created.
