= Bandit Big Rig Series =

- Country: United States
- Inaugural season: 2017
- Drivers' champion: (United States) Ricky Proffitt
- Official website: Official website

The Bandit Big Rig Series is a motorsport road racing series for semi-tractors which is held in the United States. The competition has the peculiarity that it is run on oval circuits, all of them short-tracks (circuits of less than 1 mile in length). It was created in 2017 to fill a void that existed in American motorsports after the demise of GATR racing.

== Competition format ==
All the activity of each of the rounds of the championship takes place on the same day, from the early hours of the morning until late at night. On each race day, there are different tests in which all the participants of each round compete. Furthermore, unlike other competitions where points are only scored through the race, points are also awarded in the qualifying session. In this, all the trucks that occupy the first forty positions score.

After this, the Heat Races are held, where only ten trucks score. Then the Shootout are run, a type of race where they run one against one and only the winner of it scores points (one point). After these are the Challenges Races, with twenty trucks in the points area. Finally, the final race is run, with all the trucks, in which the winner of the round is decided and the first thirty-six trucks score.

== Points earned by drivers ==
=== Classification session ===
Position	1º	2º	3º	4º	5º	6º	7º	8º	9º	10º	11º	12º	13º	14º	15º	16º	17º	18º	19º	20º	21º	22º	23º	24º	25º	26º	27º	28º	29º	30º	31º	32º	33º	34º	35º	36º	37º	38º	39º	40º
Points	40	39	38	37	36	35	34	33	32	31	30	29	28	27	26	25	24	23	22	21	20	19	18	17	16	15	14	13	12	11	10	9	8	7	6	5	4	3	2	1

=== Heat Races ===
Position	1º	2º	3º	4º	5º	6º	7º	8º	9º	10º
Points	10	9	8	7	6	5	4	3	2	1

=== Shootout ===
Position	1º	2º
Points	10	0

=== Challenges Races ===
Position	1º	2º	3º	4º	5º	6º	7º	8º	9º	10º	11º	12º	13º	14º	15º	16º	17º	18º	19º	20º
Points	20	19	18	17	16	15	14	13	12	11	10	9	8	7	6	5	4	3	2	1

=== Main-Feature Race ===
Position	1º	2º	3º	4º	5º	6º	7º	8º	9º	10º	11º	12º	13º	14º	15º	16º	17º	18º	19º	20º	21º	22º	23º	24º	25º	26º	27º	28º	29º	30º	31º	32º	33º	34º	35º	36º
Points	40	35	34	33	32	31	30	29	28	27	26	25	24	23	22	21	20	19	18	17	16	15	14	13	12	11	10	9	8	7	6	5	4	3	2	1

== Champions ==
Season	Driver	Truck
2017	(United States) Ricky Proffitt	Peterbilt
2018	(United States) Ricky Proffitt	Peterbilt
2019	(United States) Ricky Proffitt	Peterbilt
