= Tata Prima =

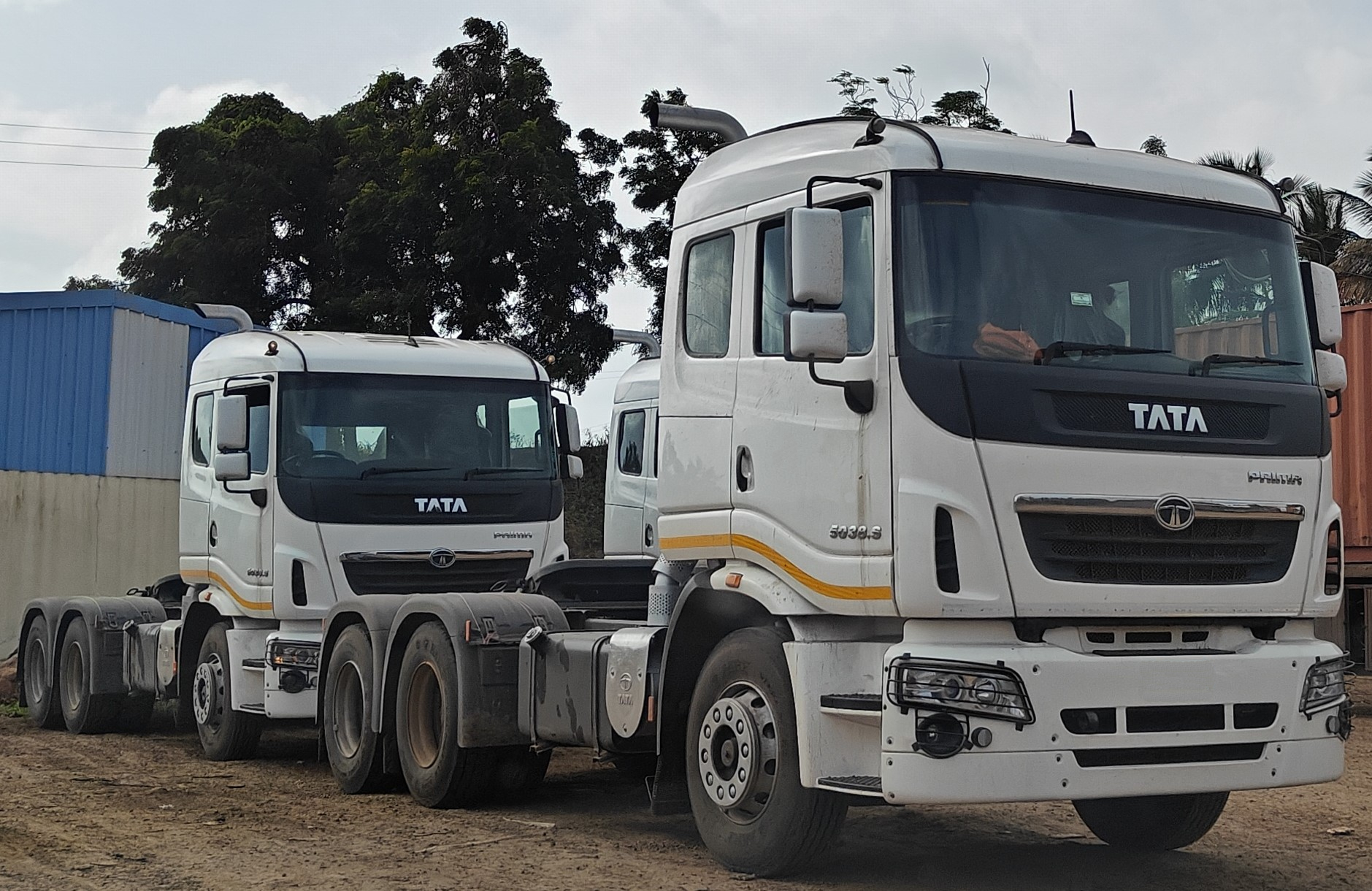

Overview
- Manufacturer: Tata Commercial Vehicle
- Also called: Tata Daewoo Prima (South Korea); Daewoo Maximus (Global)
- Production: 2008–present (Global); 2008–2021 (South Korea)
- Assembly: South Korea: Gunsan (Tata Daewoo); India: Jamshedpur, Jharkhand (Tata Motors)

Body and chassis
- Class: Heavy truck
- Body style: COE: Day cab; Sleeper cab; Globetrotter High cab

Chronology
- Successor: Tata Daewoo Maxen/Kuxen

Tata Prima is a range of heavy trucks produced by Tata Motors, a wholly owned subsidiary of Tata & Sons of India. It was first introduced in 2008 as the company's 'global' truck. Tata Prima was the winner of the 'Commercial Vehicle of the Year' at the Apollo Commercial Vehicles Awards, 2010 and 2012. The 'HCV (Cargo) Truck of the Year, 2010' and the 'HCV (Rigid) Truck of the Year, 2012'. First truck range with Common rail engine, Automatic transmission, cabin with HVAC, Air suspension driver seats, Data logger for performance tracking. The trucks have a combined loading capacity of 55 tonnes. The interior of the Prima is equipped with features like GPS, air conditioning, 4-way adjustable driver and co-driver seats, ADAS features like lane departure warning, driver eye monitoring system etc.

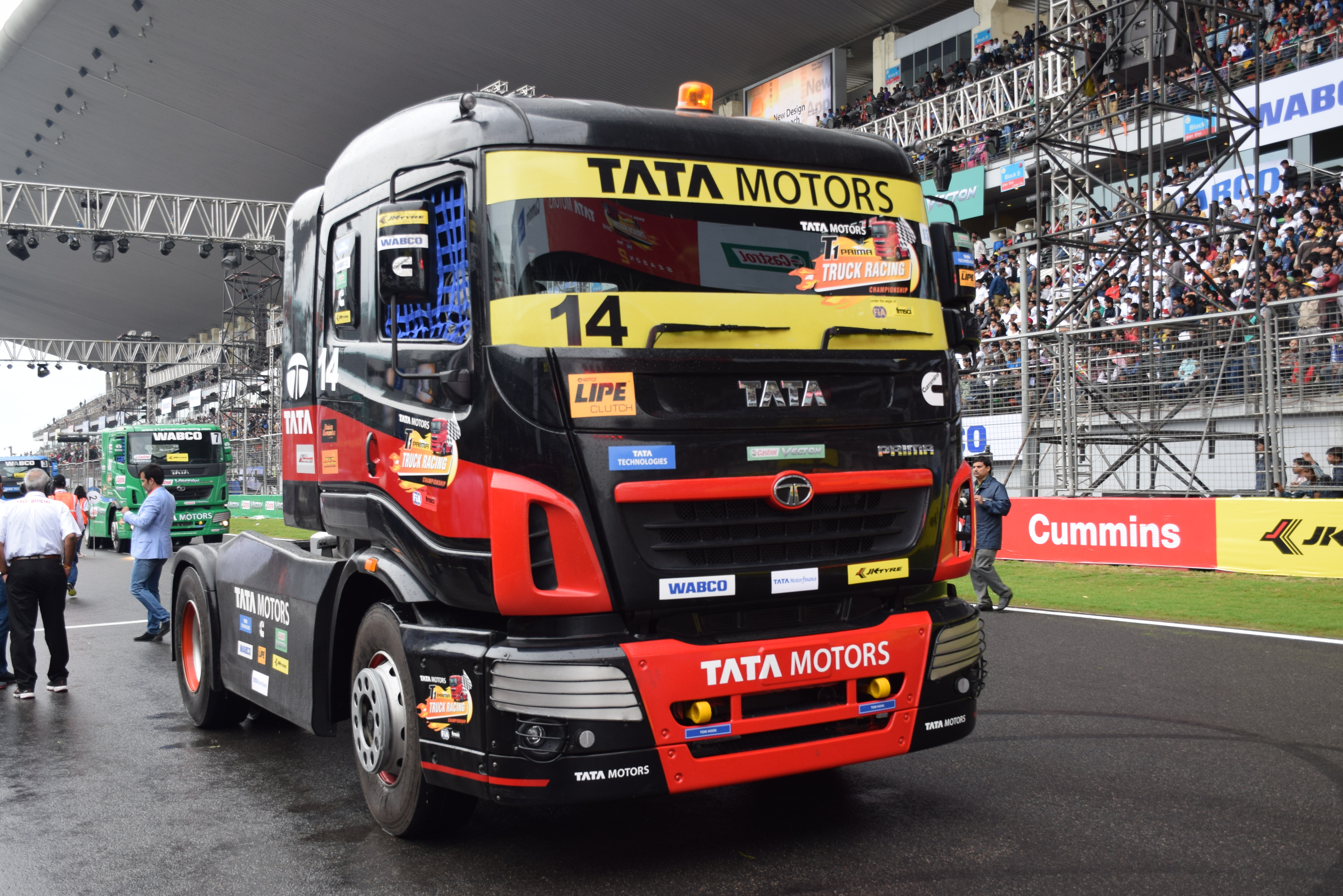
Tata Prima Racing version

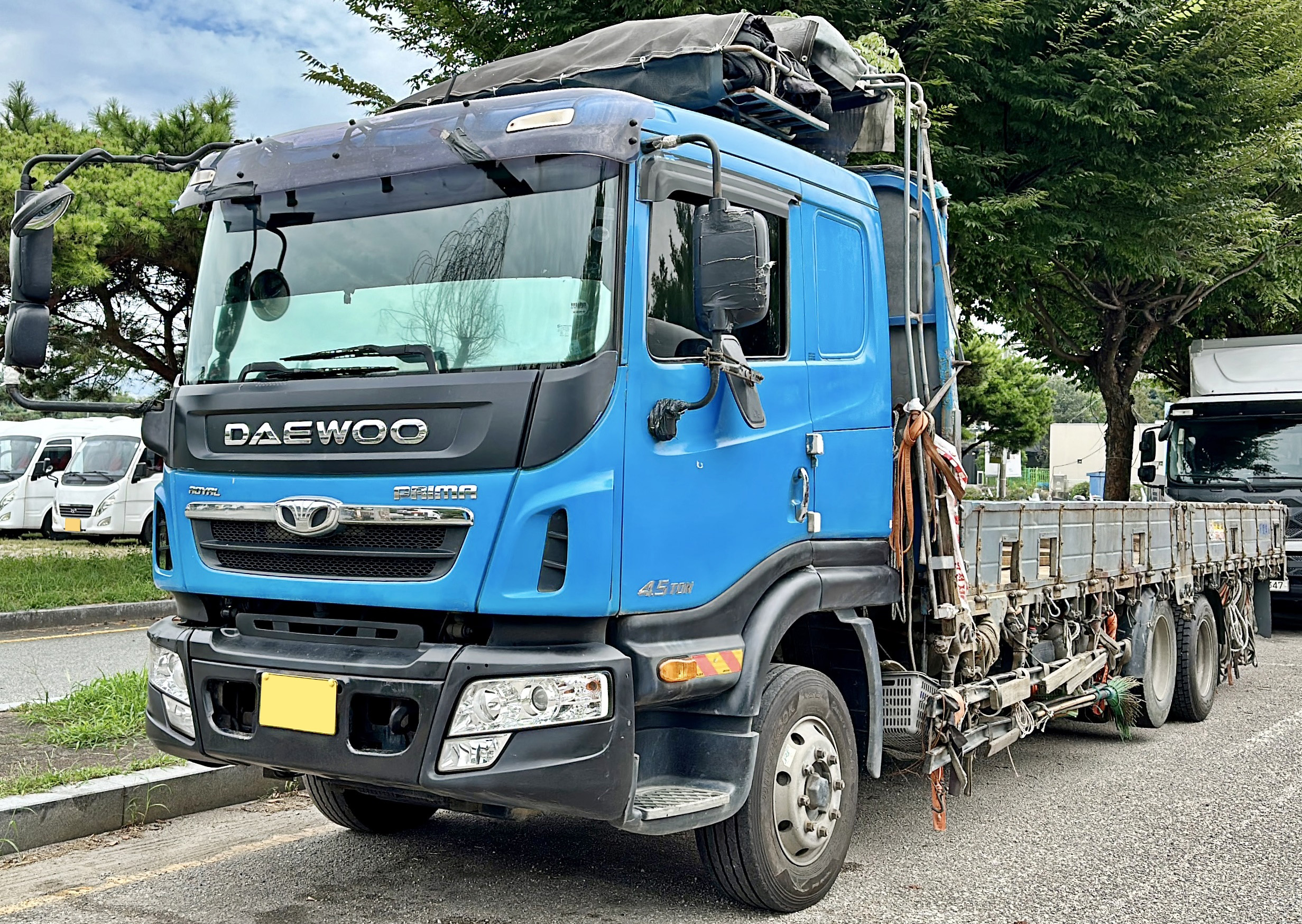
Tata Daewoo Prima in South Korea

The first in line of the Prima trucks is the Prima 4028S tractor with a 266PS Cummins ISBE engine bearing a 9 speed ZF transmission. Korean domestic market variants of the Tata Prima are equipped with either HD Hyundai Infracore made engines (older models), or newer Cummins ISMe 440 Euro 5 engines, or IVECO FPT Cursor 11 480 Euro 6 compliant engines. The tractor is available in Saudi Arabia with 380hp with 44 ton capacity and 4×2 configuration, The tractor also has ABS and dedicated axles along with a trailer to aid in heavy goods transportation. Besides focusing on the mechanics, the tractor also focuses on driver comfort which include an air-conditioned cabin with reclining seats, arm rest and an adjustable steering wheel. Global Positioning System (GPS) is a standard feature. It has some of the features like dual-clutch which are not present in some of the trucks in its price range. There are ten major variants in the Prima range which include trucks, tractors and special application vehicles.

== Facelifts ==
The Korean version was facelifted in 2017. In February 2020, the BS-6 version of the Prima was introduced at Asia's largest motor show. It is equipped with the Cummins 6.7 L ISBE with output of either 250 or 300 hp.

In 2022 Tata launched a facelifted Prima with ADAS (advanced driver-assistance system), making it the first Indian truck to have such a system; this included lane departure warning, forward collision warning and more. The cabin was also updated with a fatigue monitoring system. On the exterior, the edges of the cabin were squared off compared to the older version. Korean version was succeeded as Tata Daewoo Maxen and Kuxen at same year.

In December 2024 Tata launched their first automatic transmission truck at HEAT (Heavy Equipment and Transport) show held at Dammam, Saudi Arabia, the Tata Prima 4440. S AMT with 8.9 liter Cummins diesel engine putting out 400 hp and 1700 nm of torque. With the launch, Tata also became the first Indian commercial vehicle manufacturer to do so.

Tata launched Prima E. 55S EV 4x2 tractor truck with GVW of 55 tons and range of 350km. The power is driven from permanent-magnet synchronous motor (PMSM) type motor with output of 630hp and 2455nm of torque supported by lithium-ion phosphate battery of 450kwh. The truck also featured fast charging, Telematics and automatic transmission.

== See also ==
- Tata Motors
- Tata Daewoo
- Tata 407
- Tata Ace
- Tata Novus
