= Formula Regional Indian Championship =

Single-seater racing championship

- Category: Formula Regional
- Region: India
- Constructors: Tatuus
- Engine suppliers: Autotecnica
- Tyre suppliers: Pirelli
- Official website: Official Website

The Formula Regional Indian Championship is a planned FIA-certified Indian regional Formula 3 championship organized by Racing Promotions Pvt Ltd. The inaugural season was to be held in 2022 but was later postponed for the foreseeable future.

== Car ==
The championship will feature Tatuus-designed and built cars. The cars will be constructed out of carbon fibre and feature a monocoque chassis which features a number of enhanced safety features including the new Halo device and improved side impact protection, and will have a six-speed paddle-shift sequential gearbox. The car will be powered by an Alfa Romeo 270PS (200kW) turbo engine tuned by Autotecnica.

== Format ==
The weekend's format will be set to have three races per weekend with one single qualifying session. The fastest lap will award pole position for Race 1, while Race 3's grid will be set according to the 2nd fastest lap of every driver at the qualifying session. Race 2's grid will be a reverse grid from Race 1's results.
