= 2022 Praga Cup =

The 2022 Praga Cup was the first season of the Praga Cup made up of a grid of Praga R1Ts. The season began at Silverstone on 12 March and conclude at Donington Park on 23 October.

== Calendar ==
| Round | Circuit | Date |
|---|---|---|
| 1 | Silverstone GP, Northamptonshire | 12 March |
| 2 | Silverstone GP, Northamptonshire | 13 March |
| 3 | Oulton Park, Cheshire | 2 April |
| 4 | Snetterton Circuit (300), Norfolk | 14 May |
| 5 | Snetterton Circuit (300), Norfolk | 15 May |
| 6 | Silverstone National, Northamptonshire | 4 June |
| 7 | Silverstone National, Northamptonshire | 5 June |
| 8 | Donington Park National, Leicestershire | 20 August |
| 9 | Donington Park National, Leicestershire | 21 August |
| 10 | Donington Park GP, Leicestershire | 22 October |
| 11 | Donington Park GP, Leicestershire | 23 October |

== Teams and drivers ==
| Team | No. | Drivers | Rounds |
|---|---|---|---|
| (United Kingdom) Tim Gray Motorsport | 1 | (United Kingdom) Alex Kapadia | 1–3 |
| (United Kingdom) Tim Gray Motorsport | 1 | (United Kingdom) Richard Wells | 1–3 |
| (United Kingdom) Tim Gray Motorsport | 28 | (United Kingdom) Jack Tomalin | 1–3 |
| (United Kingdom) Tim Gray Motorsport | 28 | (United Kingdom) Stefano Leaney | 1–3 |
| (United Kingdom) Idola Motorsport | 24 | (United Kingdom) Alex Fores | 6–7 |
| (United Kingdom) Idola Motorsport | 24 | (United Kingdom) Jem Hepworth | 6–7 |
| (United Kingdom) Idola Motorsport | 24 | (United Kingdom) Lewis Appiagyei | 8–9 |
| (United Kingdom) Idola Motorsport | 24 | (United Kingdom) Ruben Stanislaus | 8–9 |
| (United Kingdom) Idola Motorsport | 53 | (United Kingdom) Miles Lacey | 1–3 |
| (United Kingdom) Idola Motorsport | 53 | (United Kingdom) Tommy Foster | 1–3 |
| (United Kingdom) Idola Motorsport | 84 | (United Kingdom) Chris Bridle | 1–9 |
| (United Kingdom) Idola Motorsport | 84 | (United Kingdom) Ed Bridle | 1–9 |
| (United Kingdom) RAW Motorsport | 4 | (United Kingdom) Robert Wheldon | 1–9 |
| (United Kingdom) RAW Motorsport | 4 | (United Kingdom) Ben Stone | 1–3, 7–9 |
| (United Kingdom) RAW Motorsport | 4 | (United Kingdom) Matt Bell | 4–6 |
| (United Kingdom) RAW Motorsport | 31 | (United Kingdom) Rod Goodman | 1–5, 8–9 |
| (United Kingdom) Motus One | 7 | (United Kingdom) Ashley Dibden | 1–2 |
| (United Kingdom) University of Wolverhampton Racing | 11 | (United Kingdom) Shane Kelly | 1–9 |
| (United Kingdom) University of Wolverhampton Racing | 11 | (United Kingdom) George Line | 1–3 |
| (United Kingdom) University of Wolverhampton Racing | 11 | (United Kingdom) Stefano Leaney | 4–9 |
| (United Kingdom) Mittell Cars | 29 | (United Kingdom) Christopher Wesemael | 1–9 |
| (United Kingdom) Mittell Cars | 29 | (United Kingdom) Dan Gore | 1–9 |
| (United Kingdom) Mittell Cars | 77 | (United Kingdom) Charles Hall | 1–9 |
| (United Kingdom) Mittell Cars | 77 | (United Kingdom) Scott Mittell | 1–9 |
| (United Kingdom) Praga Team 85 | 85 | (United Kingdom) Jamie Morton | 1–9 |
| (United Kingdom) Praga Team 85 | 85 | (United Kingdom) Ben Collins | 1–7 |
| (United Kingdom) Praga Team 85 | 85 | (United Kingdom) Scott Mansell | 8–9 |
| (United Kingdom) Arden by Idola | 86 | (United Kingdom) Jem Hepworth | 4–5 |
| (United Kingdom) Arden by Idola | 86 | (United States) David Morales | 4–5 |
| (United Kingdom) Arden by Idola | 86 | (Republic of Ireland) Corey Alleyne | 8–9 |
| (United Kingdom) Arden by Idola | 86 | (United Kingdom) Alex Connor | 8–9 |
| (United Kingdom) Fanatec Praga Team87 | 87 | (United Kingdom) Gordie Mutch | 1–9 |
| (United Kingdom) Fanatec Praga Team87 | 87 | (United Kingdom) Jimmy Broadbent | 1–9 |
Invitation team
| (United Kingdom) Idola Motorsport | 2 | (United Kingdom) Jack Fabby | 7 |
| (United Kingdom) Arden by Idola | 86 | (United Kingdom) Alex Connor | 1–2 |
| (United Kingdom) Arden by Idola | 86 | (United Kingdom) Rom Canning | 1–2 |

== Results and standings ==
=== Scoring system ===
Points are awarded to the top twenty classified finishers. The pole-sitter also receives one point, and one point is given to the driver who sets the fastest lap. Points are not awarded to invitation drivers.

| Position | 1st | 2nd | 3rd | 4th | 5th | 6th | 7th | 8th | 9th | 10th | 11th | 12th | 13th | 14th | 15th | 16th | 17th | 18th | 19th | 20th | P | F |
|---|---|---|---|---|---|---|---|---|---|---|---|---|---|---|---|---|---|---|---|---|---|---|
| Points | 32 | 27 | 23 | 20 | 18 | 17 | 16 | 15 | 14 | 13 | 12 | 11 | 10 | 9 | 8 | 7 | 6 | 5 | 4 | 3 | 1 | 1 |

=== Drivers' championship ===
| Pos. | Driver | Team | No. | SIL1 | | OUL | SNE | | SIL2 | | DON1 | | DON2 | | Pts |
|---|---|---|---|---|---|---|---|---|---|---|---|---|---|---|---|
| 1 | (United Kingdom) Gordie Mutch (United Kingdom) Jimmy Broadbent | (United Kingdom) Fanatec Praga Team87 | 87 | 4 | 9 | 2 | DSQ | 1^{P}^{F} | 6^{F} | 1 | 1^{P}^{F} | 4 | 1^{F} | 1^{P}^{F} | 285 |
| 2 | (United Kingdom) Charles Hall (United Kingdom) Scott Mittell | (United Kingdom) Mittell Cars | 77 | 7 | 1 | 3 | 1 | 6 | Ret^{P} | 8 | 8† | 1 | 6†^{P} | 6 | 239 |
| 3 | (United Kingdom) Robert Wheldon | (United Kingdom) RAW Motorsport | 4 | 2^{P} | 2^{P} | Ret | DSQ^{P} | 2 | 3 | 2^{P} | 7† | 7† | Ret | Ret | 172 |
| 4 | (United Kingdom) Shane Kelly | (United Kingdom) University of Wolverhampton Racing | 11 | 9 | 5 | 8 | 6 | 9 | 1 | 3 | Ret | 2^{P}^{F} | 7† | 2 | 163 |
| 5 | (United Kingdom) Chris Bridle (United Kingdom) Ed Bridle | (United Kingdom) Idola Motorsport | 84 | Ret | 8 | 4 | 3 | 7 | 5 | 7 | 2 | 3 | 3 | 7 | 158 |
| 6 | (United Kingdom) Jamie Morton | (United Kingdom) Praga Team 85 | 85 | Ret | 7 | 5 | 4 | 3 | 4 | 6 | 4 | Ret | 2 | 3 | 134 |
| 7 | (United Kingdom) Christopher Wesemael (United Kingdom) Dan Gore | (United Kingdom) Mittell Cars | 29 | 8 | 3 | Ret | 2 | 4 | 2 | 4 | Ret | Ret | 8† | Ret | 133 |
| 8 | (United Kingdom) Stefano Leaney | (United Kingdom) Tim Gray Motorsport (United Kingdom) University of Wolverhampton Racing | 28; 11 | 3 | Ret | Ret | 6 | 9 | 1 | 3 | Ret | 2^{P}^{F} | | | 142 |
| 9 | (United Kingdom) Ben Stone | (United Kingdom) RAW Motorsport | 4 | 2^{P} | 2^{P} | Ret | | | | 2^{P} | 7† | 7† | Ret | Ret | 121 |
| 10 | (United Kingdom) Ben Collins | (United Kingdom) Praga Team 85 | 85 | Ret | 7 | 5 | 4 | 3 | 4 | 6 | | | 2 | 3 | 114 |
| 11 | (United Kingdom) Rod Goodman | (United Kingdom) RAW Motorsport | 31 | Ret | 6 | 6 | DSQ | 8 | | | 5 | 8† | 5 | 4 | 82 |
| 12 | (United Kingdom) Alex Kapadia (United Kingdom) Richard Wells | (United Kingdom) Tim Gray Motorsport | 1 | 6^{F} | 4^{F} | 7^{F} | | | | | | | | | 57 |
| 13 | (United Kingdom) Jem Hepworth | (United Kingdom) Arden by Idola (United Kingdom) Idola Motorsport | 86; 24 | | | | 5^{F} | 5 | Ret | 5^{F} | | | | | 56 |
| 14 | (United Kingdom) Miles Lacey (United Kingdom) Tommy Foster | (United Kingdom) Idola Motorsport | 53 | 5 | Ret | 1^{P} | | | | | | | | | 53 |
| 15 | (United Kingdom) Matt Bell | (United Kingdom) RAW Motorsport | 4 | | | | DSQ^{P} | 2 | 3 | | | | | | 51 |
| 16 | (United Kingdom) George Line | (United Kingdom) University of Wolverhampton Racing | 11 | 9 | 5 | 8 | | | | | | | | | 48 |
| 17 | (Republic of Ireland) Corey Alleyne (United Kingdom) Alex Connor | (United Kingdom) Arden by Idola | 86 | | | | | | | | 3 | 6 | | | 40 |
| 18 | (United States) David Morales | (United Kingdom) Arden by Idola | 86 | | | | 5^{F} | 5 | | | | | | | 37 |
| 19 | (United Kingdom) Lewis Appiagyei (United Kingdom) Ruben Stanislaus | (United Kingdom) Idola Motorsport | 24 | | | | | | | | 6 | 5 | | | 35 |
| 20 | (United Kingdom) Jack Tomalin | (United Kingdom) Tim Gray Motorsport | 28 | 3 | Ret | Ret | | | | | | | | | 27 |
| 21 | (United Kingdom) Scott Mansell | (United Kingdom) Praga Team 85 | 85 | | | | | | | | 4 | Ret | | | 20 |
| 22 | (United Kingdom) Alex Fores | (United Kingdom) Idola Motorsport | 24 | | | | | | Ret | 5^{F} | | | | | 19 |
| 23 | (United Kingdom) Ashley Dibden | (United Kingdom) Motus One | 7 | Ret | DNS | | | | | | | | | | 0 |
Guest drivers ineligible for points
| - | (United Kingdom) Alex Connor (United Kingdom) Rom Canning | (United Kingdom) Arden by Idola | 86 | 1 | 10 | | | | | | | | | | - |
| - | (United Kingdom) Dominic Paul (United Kingdom) Alex Fores | (United Kingdom) Idola Motorsport | 86 | | | | | | | | | | 4 | 5 | - |
| - | (United Kingdom) Jack Fabby | (United Kingdom) Idola Motorsport | 2 | | | | | | | 9 | | | | | - |
| Pos. | Driver | Team | No. | SIL1 | | OUL | SNE | | SIL2 | | DON1 | | DON2 | | Pts |

Key
| Colour | Result |
|---|---|
| Gold | Winner |
| Silver | Second place |
| Bronze | Third place |
| Green | Other points position |
| Blue | Other classified position |
| Purple | Not classified, retired (Ret) |
| Black | Disqualified (DSQ) |
| White | Did not start (DNS) |
| White | Race cancelled (C) |
| Blank | Excluded (EX) |
| Blank | Withdrawn (WD) |
| Blank | Dit not enter (empty cell) |
| Annotation | Meaning |
| P | Pole position |
| F | Fastest lap |

=== Praga Cup ===
| Pos. | Team | No. | SIL1 | | OUL | SNE | | SIL2 | | DON1 | | DON2 | Pts |
|---|---|---|---|---|---|---|---|---|---|---|---|---|---|
| 1 | (United Kingdom) Fanatec Praga Team87 | 87 | 4 | 9 | 2 | DSQ | 1^{P}^{F} | 6^{F} | 1 | 1^{P}^{F} | 4 | | 202 |
| 2 | (United Kingdom) Mittell Cars | 77 | 7 | 1 | 3 | 1 | 6 | Ret^{P} | 8 | 8† | 1 | | 184 |
| 3 | (United Kingdom) RAW Motorsport | 4 | 2^{P} | 2^{P} | Ret | DSQ^{P} | 2 | 3 | 2^{P} | 7† | 7† | | 172 |
| 4 | (United Kingdom) University of Wolverhampton Racing | 11 | 9 | 5 | 8 | 6 | 9 | 1 | 3 | Ret | 2^{P}^{F} | | 163 |
| 5 | (United Kingdom) Idola Motorsport | 84 | Ret | 8 | 4 | 3 | 7 | 5 | 7 | 2 | 3 | | 158 |
| 6 | (United Kingdom) Praga Team 85 | 85 | Ret | 7 | 5 | 4 | 3 | 4 | 6 | 4 | Ret | | 134 |
| 7 | (United Kingdom) Mittell Cars | 29 | 8 | 3 | Ret | 2 | 4 | 2 | 4 | Ret | Ret | | 133 |
| 8 | (United Kingdom) RAW Motorsport | 31 | Ret | 6 | 6 | DSQ | 8 | | | 5 | 8† | | 82 |
| 9 | (United Kingdom) Arden by Idola | 86 | 1 | 10 | | 5^{F} | 5 | | | 3 | 6 | | 77 |
| 10 | (United Kingdom) Tim Gray Motorsport | 1 | 6^{F} | 4^{F} | 7^{F} | | | | | | | | 57 |
| 11 | (United Kingdom) Idola Motorsport | 24 | | | | | | Ret | 5^{F} | 6 | 5 | | 54 |
| 12 | (United Kingdom) Idola Motorsport | 53 | 5 | Ret | 1^{P} | | | | | | | | 53 |
| 13 | (United Kingdom) Tim Gray Motorsport | 28 | 3 | Ret | Ret | | | | | | | | 27 |
| 14 | (United Kingdom) Motus One | 7 | Ret | DNS | | | | | | | | | 0 |
| Pos. | Team | No. | SIL1 | | OUL | SNE | | SIL2 | | DON1 | | DON2 | Pts |

Key
| Colour | Result |
|---|---|
| Gold | Winner |
| Silver | Second place |
| Bronze | Third place |
| Green | Other points position |
| Blue | Other classified position |
| Purple | Not classified, retired (Ret) |
| Black | Disqualified (DSQ) |
| White | Did not start (DNS) |
| White | Race cancelled (C) |
| Blank | Excluded (EX) |
| Blank | Withdrawn (WD) |
| Blank | Dit not enter (empty cell) |
| Annotation | Meaning |
| P | Pole position |
| F | Fastest lap |
| Italic | Ineligible for points |
