= Praga R1 =

Race car

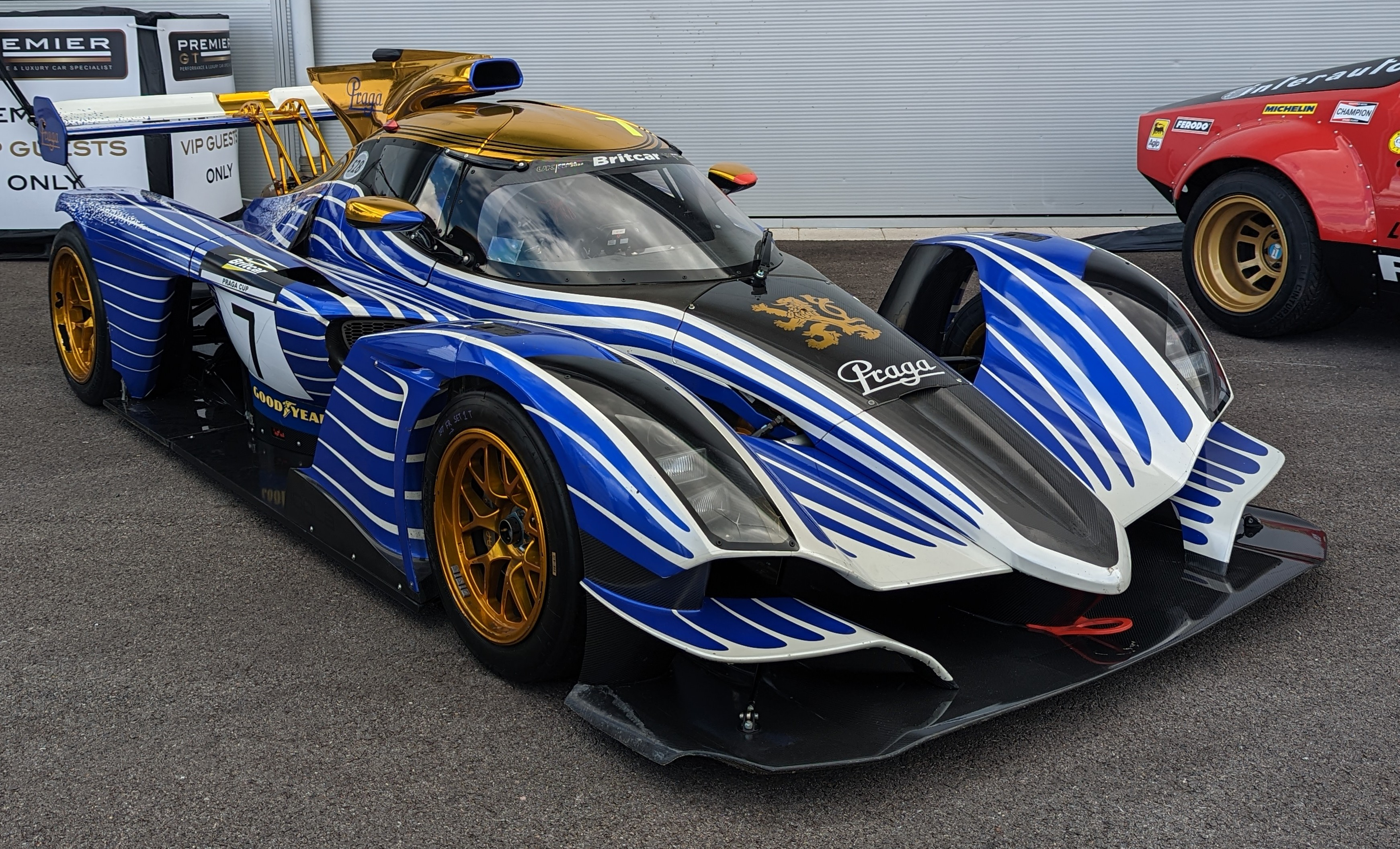
- Praga R1 (2022)
- Category: Supercar Challenge Superlights PR1
- Constructor: Praga Racing
- Designer: Juraj Mitro
- Production: 2012–present
- Predecessor: Praga R4S

Technical specifications
- Chassis: Carbon fiber monocoque
- Length: 4,144 mm (163 in)
- Width: 1,800 mm (71 in)
- Height: 965 mm (38 in)
- Wheelbase: 2,527 mm (99 in)
- Engine: Renault F4R 832 (R-A Praga T Engine) 1,998 cc (121.9 cu in) Inline-4 Advanced turbocharger management longitudinal mid-engined
- Transmission: Hewland JFR six-speed sequential semi-automatic transaxle gearbox
- Power: 330–390 hp (246–291 kW; 335–395 PS)
- Weight: 643 kg (1,417.6 lb)
- Fuel: Euro98, 60 liters
- Lubricants: Syntix Lubricants
- Tyres: Front: Dunlop 200/580R15; Rear: Dunlop 265/605R16

Competition history
- Notable entrants: Praga Racing Slovakia; Dutch Endurance Racing Team; Blueberry Racing; Fellner Motorsport
- Notable drivers: (Netherlands) Robert de Graaff (Slovakia) Leonard Hrobarek (United Kingdom) Charlie Martin (Netherlands) Phillipe Ribbens (Slovakia) Stefan Rosina (Netherlands) Danny van Dongen (Netherlands) Berry van Elk (Netherlands) Carlo Kuijer (Netherlands) Nol Köhler (Netherlands) Ronald van Loon (Netherlands) Dick van Elk (Austria) Simon Wagner (United Kingdom) Ben Collins (United Kingdom) Jimmy Broadbent (Austria) Jesse Gröse (United States) Tim Barber (United States) Steven Ferrario (United States) Paul Blikman
- Debut: 2013 Supercar Challenge (Slovakian round)

The Praga R1 is a racing and sports car made by Czech car manufacturer Praga. The cars raced on the Supercar Challenge and the Britcar Endurance Championship.

== Development ==
The first Praga R1 was built in 2012. Official Praga testdriver Danny van Dongen drove the car for the first time on October 10, 2012. Production of the R1 began in March 2013.

== Racing history ==
On 15 November 2012 the Supercar Challenge organisation in conjunction with Praga Racing and Radical Benelux launched a new racing class. The Supercar Challenge Superlights would feature four sub-classes, one for the Praga R1, one for the Radical SR8, one for the Radical SR3 and one for Group CN cars.

=== 2013 ===
The first race of the Superlights class was run at the Slovakia Ring. Praga Racing announced that they would enter 10 Praga R1's in the first round. Due to a strike in the Spanish customs division most of the wheels, produced by Spanish company Braid Wheels, did not arrive in time. Due to not having enough wheels only three cars could start the first race. The drivers (Van Dongen, Wagner, Hrobarek and Rosina) had their first racing experience with the Praga R1 on May 17. Danny van Dongen was the fastest Praga in free practice, setting a third time overall behind two Radical SR8's, and in front of a Norma M20F and two Radical SR3's. Danny van Dongen took the first pole position in the PR1 class, fourth overall. Stefan Rosina won the first race.

=== 2014 ===
During the 2014 season the Praga R1 was part of the Supercar Challenge, drivers Berry van Elk, Carlo Kuijer, Nol Köhler and Danny van Dongen we participating in the championship in Europe. At the Menzo 24 Hours of Zolder the Praga R1 was classified in 3rd class and completed the first ever 24 hours race with the Praga R1. The drivers were Ronald van Loon, Nol Köhler, Berry van Elk and Carlo Kuijer.

=== 2017 ===
The Praga R1T was entered for the 2017 Dutch GT & Prototype Challenge in CN class, being run by VR Motorsport in their first year with the car and this championship. The driver line-up consisted of Tim Gray, Oliver Hewitt & Alastair Boulton. For a first season, the team performed well with multiple podium positions and an outright win at Zolder.

=== 2018 ===
The Praga R1T was entered for the 2018 Dutch GT & Prototype Challenge in CN class, being run by VR Motorsport, with drivers Tim Gray & Alain Berg. strong results saw the Praga win the CN class. The highlight of the year being an outright win against the more powerful LMP3 cars in a DTM support race at Zandvoort.

=== 2019 ===
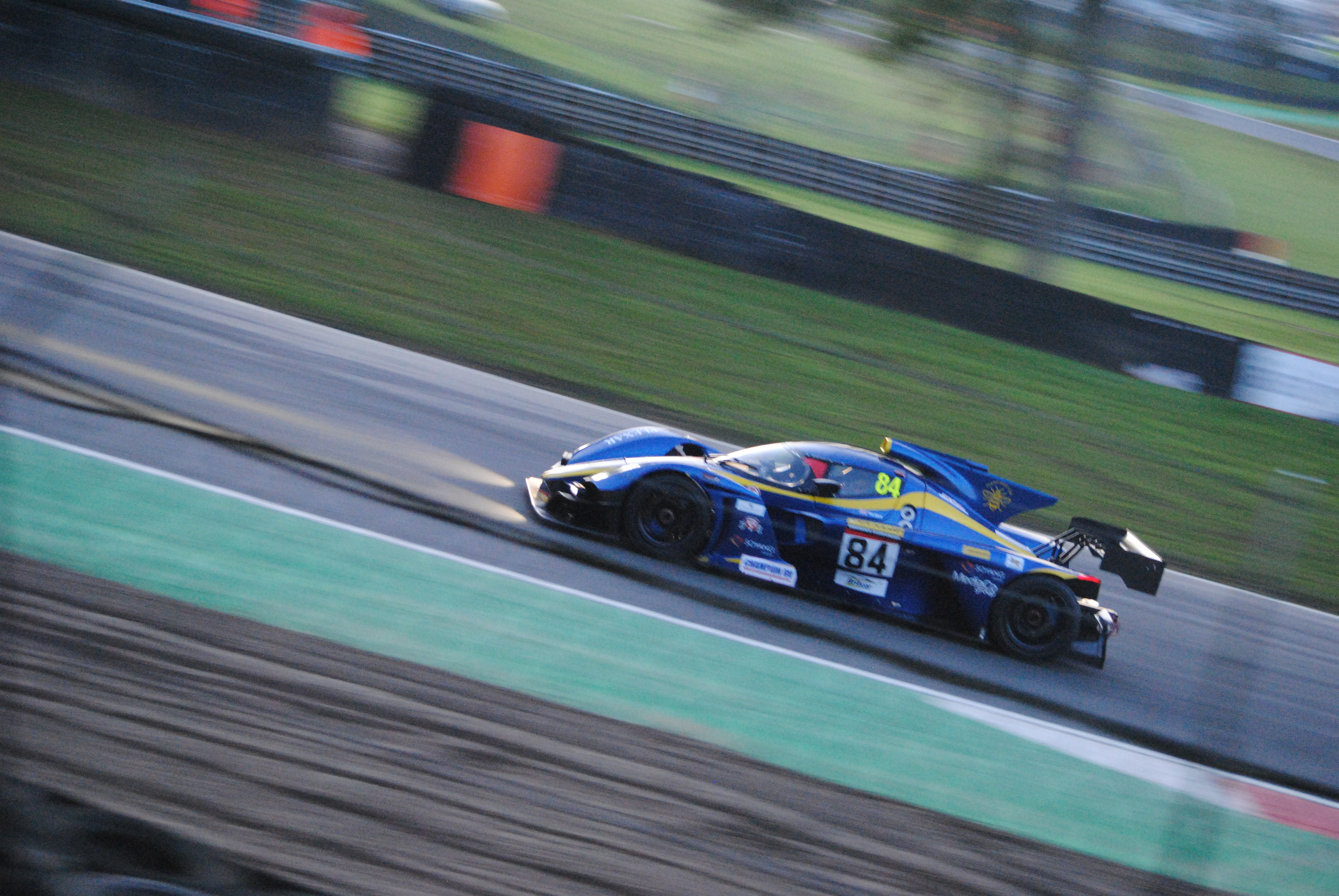
The Class 1-winning Praga R1 in the 2019 Britcar Endurance Championship

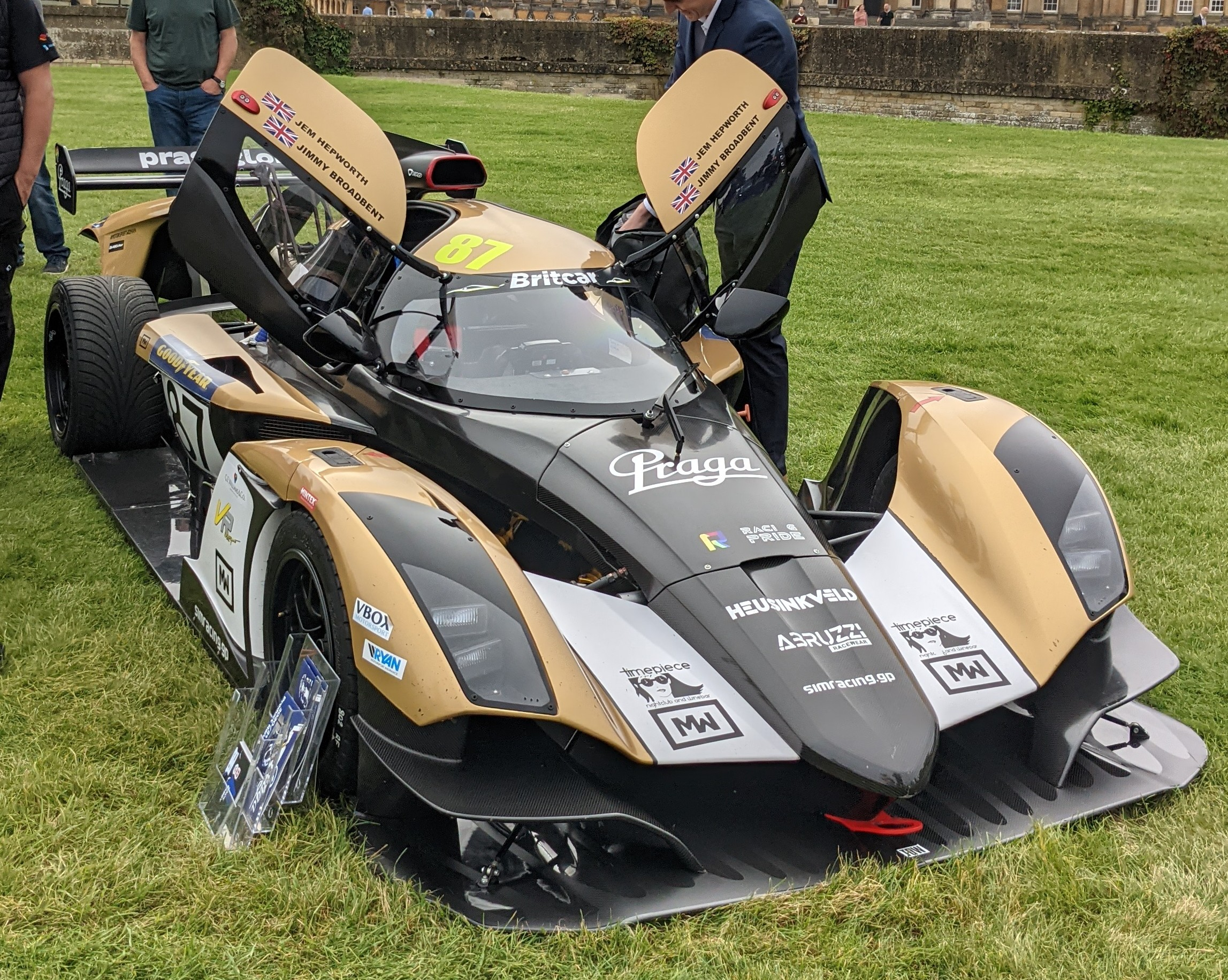
Praga R1 during 2021 Britcar Endurance Championship

The Praga R1T was entered for the 2019 Britcar Endurance Championship, being run by VR Motorsport, with drivers Tim Gray, Grant Williams and Alastair Boulton at the wheel in various parts of the season. It had been a strong contender in the championship but in the second half of the season, the car experienced problems and dropped to sixth before having a good race in the final round of the championship at Brands Hatch. After swapping the provisional pole position spot with the Brabham BT62, it ended up third on the grid. In the first race, fuse problems, accompanied by a door issue put the car down the field in 11th at the end of the race. In the second race, the car was a lot more reliable, ending the race in 2nd place. The team ended the season 4th overall but 1st in class.

Using the "R1T-F" variant of the Praga R1, Fellner Motorsport finished 3rd overall in the 2019 edition of the Thunderhill 25 Hours with drivers Danny Van Dongen, Tim Barber, Jesse Gröse, Steven Ferrario, and Paul Blikman.

=== 2020 ===
In 2020, VR Motorsport upgraded to a three-Praga entry with two Class 1 cars and one Class 2 entry. One of the R1T Evos took pole position and the overall race 2 win. Danny Harrison and Jem Hepworth won the overall and Class 1 title in the 2020 Britcar Endurance Championship, Jack Fabby and Garry Townsend finished 3rd overall and 2nd in Class 1 while Martyn Compton and Warren McKinlay were 9th overall and 3rd in Class 2.

Praga Cars announced in September 2020, that the 2021 Britcar Endurance Championship would feature an all-new Praga-only category, which would pave the way for a one-make Praga series in 2022, also announcing they would field a series of guest drivers at various events throughout the season.

=== 2021 ===
Praga unveiled their new refreshed all-carbon Praga R1 on 20 January 2021. It was designed to produce 15% more downforce and reduce the drag by 5%. Upgrades to the engine were also made which improved the throttle response along with increased torque. Sim racer Jimmy Broadbent, ex-TV star and SAS soldier Jay Morton, YouTuber and businessman James Walker, otherwise known as "Mr JWW", supercar driver Miles Lacey, as well as Abbie Eaton and Gordie Mutch, a protegé of Romain Grosjean, were announced as the guest drivers in the new Praga R1, with one more driver yet to be announced.

The first-ever running of a dedicated Praga class took at the Silverstone Circuit in April 2021 in the Britcar Endurance Championship, with eight Praga R1 racing cars.

== Praga R1R ==
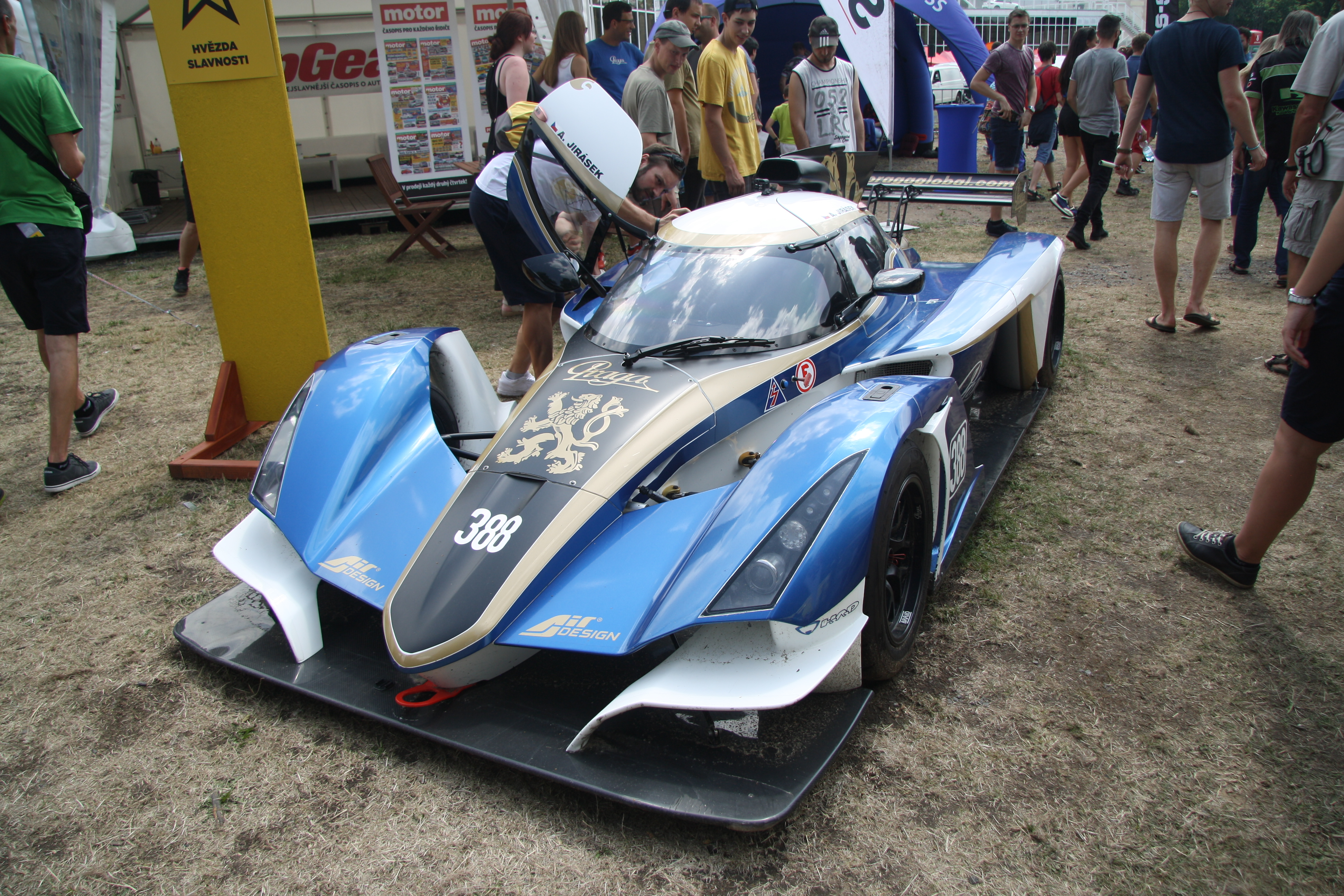
Praga R1R in Prague (2018)

The Praga R1R is a mid-engined production sports car based on the R1. This is Praga's first road car since 1947. The car is powered by the same engine, transmission, brakes, clutch, and chassis, but has a few differences, like being slightly smaller than the R1.

== In video games ==
The Praga R1 appeared in racing games Raceroom (2013), Assetto Corsa (2014), Asphalt 9: Legends (2018) and Rennsport (2024).
