= Racing Pride =

LGBTQ rights movement in motorsport

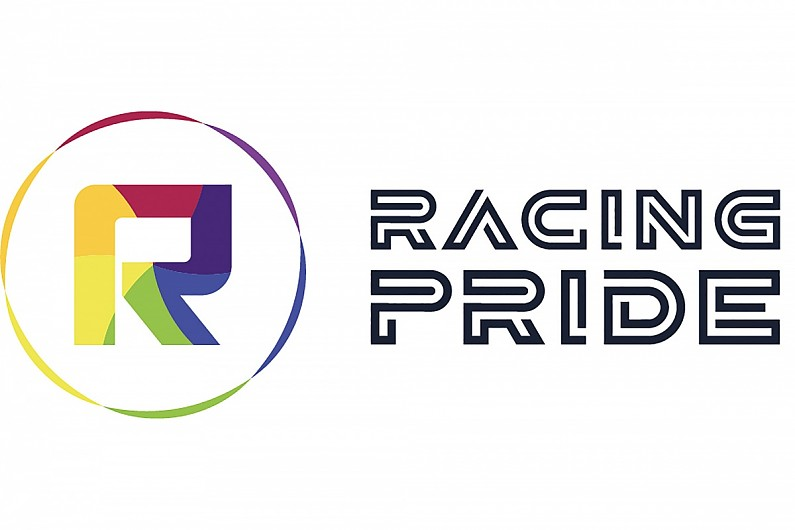
- Racing Pride logo
- Formation: 6 June 2019; 6 years ago
- Type: NGO
- Purpose: LGBT rights
- Headquarters: London
- Region served: Great Britain
- Website: www.racingpride.com

Racing Pride is a lesbian, gay, bisexual and transgender (LGBTQ) rights movement working in the motorsport industry to promote and champion inclusivity across the sport, and amongst its technological and commercial partners.

The organisation was founded in 2019 in partnership with LGBT rights charity Stonewall.

Racing Pride has announced a number of Driver Ambassadors from across a range of motorsport disciplines to improve the visibility of LGBT people in the industry and to increase inclusivity amongst racing fans and organisers.

Those drivers who have already been announced as Racing Pride Ambassadors include Richard Morris, Charlie Martin, Sarah Moore and Abbie Eaton.

The organisation has also gone on to partner with a number of motorsport organisations, such as the British Automobile Racing Club, the British Racing and Sports Car Club, Formula Student and Team Parker Racing.

== Partnership with Aston Martin F1 ==
In June 2021, Racing Pride announced a partnership with Aston Martin F1 to hold a series of social and community initiatives to raise awareness of LGBTQ+ diversity and inclusion. Coinciding with Pride Month 2021, the collaboration also saw Racing Pride logos appear on the Aston Martin Formula One cars at the 2021 French Grand Prix.

Four time F1 Champion, and Aston Martin F1 driver Sebastian Vettel said of the partnership: "I want to help highlight the positivity around the message of inclusion and acceptance. I congratulate the people who have pushed the discussion that has led to wider inclusion; but, equally, I'm aware that more needs to be done to change attitudes and remove much of the remaining negativity. It is great to see Aston Martin Cognizant Formula One team giving this issue support - there is a long road ahead, but I'm really pleased we can play a positive role".

== Partnership with Alpine F1 Team ==
In June 2022, Racing Pride announced a partnership with Alpine F1 Team, which saw Racing Pride work with Alpine on a number of initiatives to ensure their pathways for attracting emerging talent are welcoming to LGBTQ+ people, and the team pledged to show support and raise awareness and for the LGBTQ+ community. Coinciding with Pride Month 2022, the Formula 1 team also ran a special pride livery on their Alpine A522 cars throughout the month of June, with other nods to the LGBTQ+ community throughout the team’s sites.

Alpine CEO Laurent Rossi said of the partnership: "For so long, motorsport has not been representative of the diversity we see in wider society. There are various reasons, but we need to look forward and challenge the biases we see. Our journey starts here. The LGBTQ+ community has lacked visible representation and support within our industry, and we need to change this. We want Alpine to be an open, inclusive and productive place to work and for our employees to feel happy and supported in their workplace. A happy environment gives greater creativity and that is exactly what we need to foster as we move forward. To do so, we need to fully understand the challenges some of the under-represented groups in motorsport face. Pride Month is a good place to start; we know that we need to do more to give this community a voice and representation.".

== See also ==
- LGBT rights in the United Kingdom
- List of LGBT rights organisations
