= Jimmy Broadbent =

British racing driver and YouTuber (born 1991)

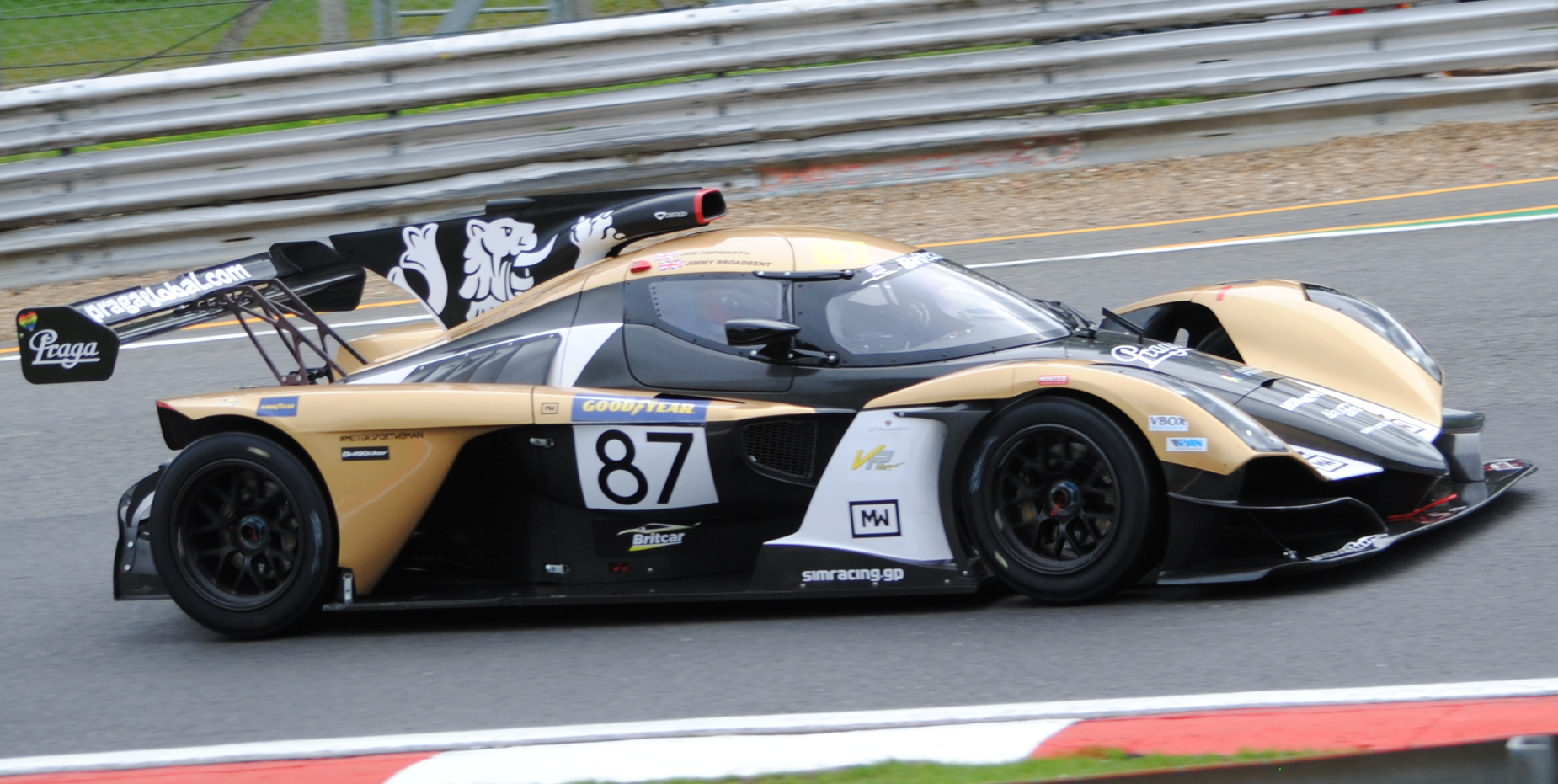
- Broadbent driving Praga R1 'Goldie' at Brands Hatch
- Nationality: (United Kingdom) British
- Born: James Alan Broadbent; 13 June 1991 (age 35) Hastings, England

Nürburgring Langstrecken-Serie career
- Debut season: 2023
- Current team: Black Falcon Team Fanatec
- Categorisation: FIA Bronze

Previous series
- 2021 2022: Britcar; Praga Cup

Championship titles
- 2022: Praga Cup

YouTube information
- Channel: Jimmy Broadbent
- Years active: 2012–present
- Genres: Gaming; sim racing; auto racing
- Subscribers: 1.04 million
- Views: 400 million
- Last updated: 3 August 2026

James Alan "Jimmy" Broadbent (born 13 June 1991), also known by his nicknames Jimbo and Jimmer, is an English social media personality, commentator, and racing driver. He has over a million subscribers on his YouTube channel, with content related to sim racing and motor racing. Broadbent currently competes in the Nürburgring Langstrecken-Serie for Black Falcon Team Fanatec, and also commentates for the Gran Turismo World Series esports tournament.

Broadbent's popularity has been partially attributed to his modest background, having lived in a shed in his mother's garden for a long period of time, and his honesty with personal struggles, both traits in stark contrast with the trend of internet celebrities portraying an artificial idyllic life.

== YouTube career ==
Broadbent began uploading content for YouTube in 2012, his first video being published in May of that year. His early videos consisted of raw video game footage with no commentary from sim racing games such as rFactor. This would later develop into sim racing content with commentary throughout the years. He reached 10,000 subscribers in 2017; on 4 June 2018, he reached 100,000 subscribers. By the end of 2020, he had over 600,000 subscribers. Nearly five years later on 4 July 2025, Broadbent reached 1 million subscribers on YouTube.

On 14 April 2018, Broadbent was temporarily banned by YouTube while viewing Michael Dunlop's then-lap record from 2016 on the Isle of Man TT Mountain Course on his stream. His stream was also terminated for use of copyrighted content, as entertainment distributor Duke Video held the rights to all Isle of Man TT content. Broadbent's ban was lifted the following day after Duke Video had lifted the claim on his livestream.

Since 2019, Broadbent has hosted "The Race for Mental Health," a charity 23-hour race at Circuit Zolder in iRacing, with all funds going to the charity Mind in memory of his father, Alan Broadbent. In November 2020, Jimmy raised over £71,000 in the charity race. For the 2024 edition, the charity race raised over £95,000 for Mind.

== Commentary role ==
Broadbent was invited by Polyphony Digital, the creators of the Gran Turismo video game series, to work as a commentator on their FIA-Certified Gran Turismo Championships.

== Racing career ==
=== In sim racing ===
In 2019, Broadbent took part in the annual iRacing 24 Hours of Le Mans in the iRacing video game, with teammates Adam David Hodgkinson and Nate Lupson with the 2016 Audi R18 LMP1 prototype sports car, and won their race overall. On May 16, 2020, Broadbent won his split in the annual iRacing Indy 500.

During the COVID-19 lockdown in 2020, Broadbent participated in Formula One's F1 Esports Virtual Grand Prix exhibition series in the F1 2019 video game, taking part in the Bahrain round in a Racing Point RP19. He fought McLaren driver Lando Norris for 4th place at the final lap of the race, with Broadbent ultimately taking the position at the final corner after a collision with Norris. He later participated in the 2020 24 Hours of Le Mans Virtual esports event in the rFactor 2 video game, piloting an Aston Martin Vantage GTE for Mahle Racing alongside former IndyCar Series driver Robert Wickens, Deutsche Tourenwagen Masters driver Ferdinand Habsburg and sim racer Kevin Rotting. They classified in 46th place overall and 17th place in their class.

Broadbent returned to the event in 2022, racing a Porsche 911 RSR GTE for Team Project 1 x BPM, alongside René Buttler, Bram Beelen and Tim Neuendorf. In the end, the team finished in 33rd place overall and 14th place in their class. The following event in 2023 saw him race a BMW M8 GTE for Mahle Racing, driving alongside FIA World Endurance Championship and W Series driver Beitske Visser and sim racers Muhammed Patel and Michele D’Alessandro. The team qualified in seventh place setting a time of 3:46.894 and then in the race, finished in ninth place and 32nd place overall scoring four points.

=== In real-life motorsport ===
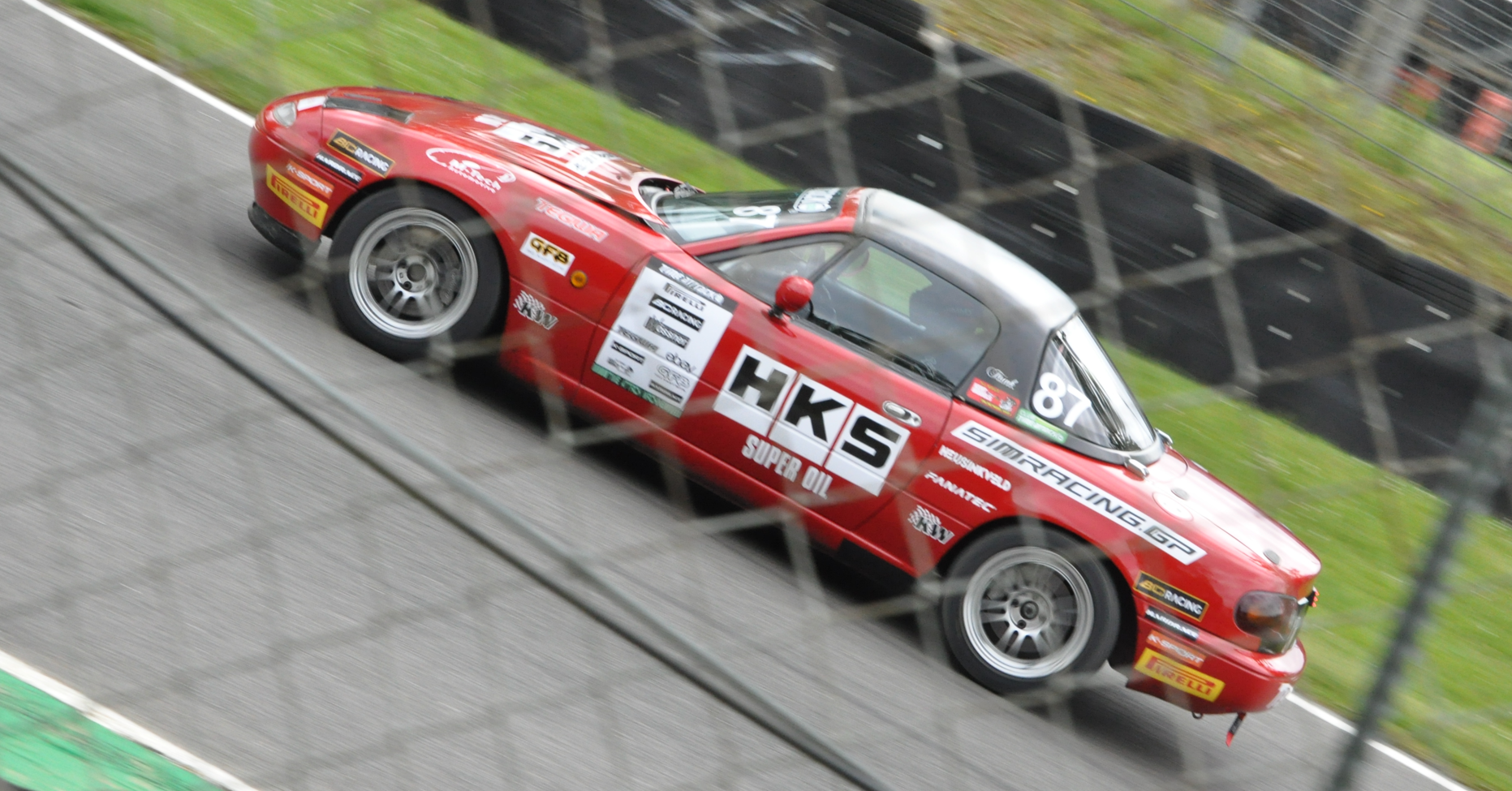
Broadbent competing in the Club Time Attack Championship in the Pocket Rocket Class.

==== 2021: Racing debut ====
In 2021, it was announced that Broadbent would take part in the 2021 Britcar Endurance Championship with Team J2 Praga, driving the Praga R1 alongside Jem Hepworth in the Praga class. At the season opening round in Silverstone Circuit, Broadbent and Hepworth would finish sixth and eighth in Race 1 and Race 2 respectively. In the following round in Snetterton Circuit, the duo would retire in Race 1, but would come back to finish tenth in Race 2. The third round at Oulton Park saw the team struggle, as the two drivers would gather 23rd place and 12th place finishes in both races. At the second Silverstone round in Round 4, they would score a sixth place finish. Due to a support race fatality, the next round in Brands Hatch was cancelled. For the final race of the season, it was announced that Gordie Mutch would be replacing Hepworth as Broadbent's teammate to compete in Donington Park. Donington would prove to be the team's most successful race of the year, as Broadbent and Mutch would sweep the round and win both races, allowing the team to finish fifth overall in the championship standings.

==== 2022: Praga Cup title ====
In March 2022, Broadbent founded his racing team, Team87. Team87 signed a multi-year partnership deal with German sim racing peripheral manufacturer Fanatec in August of that year. The next month, Bell Sports became the team's official helmet manufacturer.

Broadbent and Mutch would race again as teammates in 2022 for Team87, this time participating in the inaugural 2022 Praga Cup season. The team experienced a solid start in the first three rounds of the season, scoring two podiums and a ninth place finish. At the fourth round, Broadbent and Mutch would take the chequered flag in the lead, however, they were disqualified post-race during scrutineering after a turbocharger issue was discovered on the team's Praga R1. They would win the next Snetterton race, however, as well as four additional wins in the next six races afterwards in Silverstone and Donington, allowing the team to clinch the drivers' and teams' championships at the end of the season. The championship victory gave Broadbent his first motorsport title as both a driver and team owner.

==== 2023: Nürburgring Endurance Series ====
In December 2022, it was announced that Broadbent would be taking part in testing of the 2023 BMW M4 GT4 in the Circuito de Almería in Spain with BMW Motorsport.

As of April 2024, Broadbent competes with a FIA Bronze racing licence. On 3 June, Broadbent released a video on YouTube announcing that he would be participating in the Nürburgring Endurance Series for 2023 alongside sim racing YouTubers Misha Charoudin and Steve Alvarez Brown (Super GT). The trio will be part of a Bilstein-organized VT2 class entry, driving a heavily modified BMW 330i by Black Falcon.

==== 2024: New machinery and 24 Hours of Nürburgring ====
For the 2024 NLS season Broadbent competed in a BMW M4 GT4 of Team Bilstein. Charoudin and Brown were also part of the team again and they were joined by the 2016 24 Hours of Nürburgring overall winner, Manuel Metzger. It was also announced that the team would compete in the 2024 24 Hours of Nürburgring for the first time. They would also complete in the SP8T class in the NLS and N24H.

== Personal life ==
Broadbent's father, Alan, died by suicide when Jimmy was only 13 years old after struggling from alcoholism and depression.

In an interview with DriveTribe in 2020, Broadbent told that around 2014, he "lost everything" due to depression and other mental health issues, especially regarding sociability. He lost his job, his house and his fiancée broke up with him. He stated that he had struggled and continues to deal with depression and suicidal thoughts. With nowhere to live, he moved to a shed in his mother's house's garden. He stayed there and also produced content from there. The shed eventually became an inside joke of Broadbent and his YouTube community. In 2021, Broadbent bought his own house and moved out of the shed.

Broadbent has owned multiple cars, and he's often documented his experiences with them on his YouTube channel. He currently owns an R32 Nissan Skyline GT-R, a MK4 Toyota Supra, an R35 Nissan GT-R, a first-generation Subaru Impreza WRX RA, a Toyota Estima, a modified NA Mazda MX-5 that he's used for time attack racing and a Ferrari 360. He used to own a Nissan 350Z and a Ford Mondeo ST220. He had bought "Goldie" (the Praga R1 he drove in the Praga Cup), but he sold it in 2025.

== Racing record ==
=== Racing career summary ===
| Season | Series | Team | Races | Wins | Poles | F/Laps | Podiums | Points | Position |
|---|---|---|---|---|---|---|---|---|---|
| 2021 | Britcar Endurance Championship - Praga | Team J2 Praga | 9 | 2 | 0 | 0 | 2 | 171 | 5th |
| 2022 | Praga Cup | Fanatec Praga Team87 | 11 | 5 | 2 | 3 | 7 | 285 | 1st |
| 2023 | Nürburgring Langstrecken-Serie - VT2-R+4WD | Black Falcon Team Bilstein | 4 | 0 | 0 | 0 | 1 | 0 | NC† |
| 2024 | Nürburgring Langstrecken-Serie - SP8T | Team Bilstein by Black Falcon | 7 | 3 | 0 | 0 | 4 | 0 | NC† |
| 2024 | 24 Hours of Nürburgring - SP8T | Team Bilstein by Black Falcon | 1 | 0 | 0 | 0 | 1 | N/A | 2nd |
| 2024 | 24H Series - TCX | J-Mec Engineering | 1 | 0 | 1 | 0 | 1 | 54 | 4th |
| 2024 | Ginetta GT Championship - AM | Xentek Motorsport | | | | | | | |
| 2025 | Nürburgring Langstrecken-Serie - SP8T | Team Bilstein by Black Falcon | 7 | 2 | 0 | 0 | 7 | 84 | 3rd |
| 2025 | Britcar Endurance Championship | Race Car Experience | 2 | 0 | 1 | 0 | 0 | 0 | |
| 2026 | Nürburgring Langstrecken-Serie - AT2 | Black Falcon Team Fanatec | | | | | | | |

^{†} As Broadbent was a guest driver, he was ineligible to score points.

^{*} Season still in progress.

=== Complete Britcar results ===
| Year | Team | Car | Class | 1 | 2 | 3 | 4 | 5 | 6 | 7 | 8 | 9 | 10 | 11 | DC | CP | Points |
|---|---|---|---|---|---|---|---|---|---|---|---|---|---|---|---|---|---|
| 2021 | Team J2 Praga | Praga R1 (Mk5) | Praga | SIL1; 1; 6 | SIL1; 2; 8 | SNE; 1 Ret | SNE; 2; 10 | OUL; 1; 23 | OUL; 2; 12 | SIL2; 1; 6 | BRH; 1 C | BRH; 2 C | DON; 1; 1 | DON; 2; 1 | 5th | 5th | 171 |
| 2025 | Race Car Experience | Peugeot 308 | Cup Class | SIL1; 1 Ret | SIL1; 2 DNS | | | | | | | | | | | | |

=== Complete Praga Cup results ===
| Year | Team | Car | 1 | 2 | 3 | 4 | 5 | 6 | 7 | 8 | 9 | 10 | 11 | DC | Points |
|---|---|---|---|---|---|---|---|---|---|---|---|---|---|---|---|
| 2022 | Fanatec Praga Team87 | Praga R1 (Mk5) | SIL1; 1; 4 | SIL1; 2; 9 | OUL; 1; 2 | SNE; 1 DSQ | SNE; 2; 1 | SIL2; 1; 6 | SIL2; 1; 1 | DON1; 1; 1 | DON1; 2; 4 | DON2; 1; 1 | DON2; 2; 1 | 1st | 285 |

=== Nürburgring Langstrecken-Serie results ===
| Year | Team | Co-Drivers | Car | Class | 1 | 2 | 3 | 4 | 5 | 6 | 7 | 8 | 9 | 10 | 11 | CC | OC | Points |
|---|---|---|---|---|---|---|---|---|---|---|---|---|---|---|---|---|---|---|
| 2023 | (Germany) Team Bilstein by Black Falcon | (Netherlands) Misha Charoudin (United Kingdom) Steve Alvarez Brown | BMW 330i | VT2-R+4WD | NLS; 1 | NLS; 2 | NLS; 3 | NLS; 4 | NLS; 5 | NLS; 6 Ret | NLS; 7; 5 | NLS; 8; 3 | NLS; 9; 4 | | | NC† | NC† | 0 |
| 2024 | (Germany) Team Bilstein by Black Falcon | (Netherlands) Misha Charoudin (United Kingdom) Steve Alvarez Brown (Germany) Manuel Metzger | BMW M4 GT4 Gen II | SP 8T | NLS; 1 Ret | NLS; 2; 1 | 24H-Q1; 2 | 24H-Q2; 4 | NLS; 3 Ret | NLS; 4; 1 | NLS; 5; 1 | NLS; 6 | | | | NC† | NC† | 0 |
| 2025 | (Germany) Team Bilstein by Black Falcon | (Netherlands) Misha Charoudin (United Kingdom) Steve Alvarez Brown (Germany) Manuel Metzger | BMW M4 GT4 Gen II | SP 8T | NLS; 1; 1 | NLS; 2; 2 | NLS; 3; 2 | 24H-Q1; 2 | 24H-Q2; 2 | NLSL | NLS; 6; 2 | NLS; 7 | NLS; 8 | NLS; 9 | NLS; 10; 1 | 3rd | 19th | 84 |

=== 24 Hours of Nürburgring results ===
| Year | Team | Co-Drivers | Car | Class | Laps | Pos. | Class Pos. |
|---|---|---|---|---|---|---|---|
| 2024 | (Germany) Team Bilstein by Black Falcon | (Netherlands) Misha Charoudin (Germany) Manuel Metzger | BMW M4 GT4 Gen II | SP 8T | 45 | 38th | 2nd |
| 2025 | (Germany) Team Bilstein by Black Falcon | (United Kingdom) Steve Alvarez Brown (Netherlands) Misha Charoudin (Germany) Manuel Metzger | BMW M4 GT4 EVO (G82) | SP 8T | 130 | 21st | 2nd |
| 2026 | (Germany) Black Falcon Team Fanatec | (United Kingdom) Steve Alvarez Brown (Netherlands) Misha Charoudin (Germany) Manuel Metzger | Porsche 992 GT3 Cup | AT2 | 70 | NC | DNF |
