= 2021 Britcar Endurance Championship =

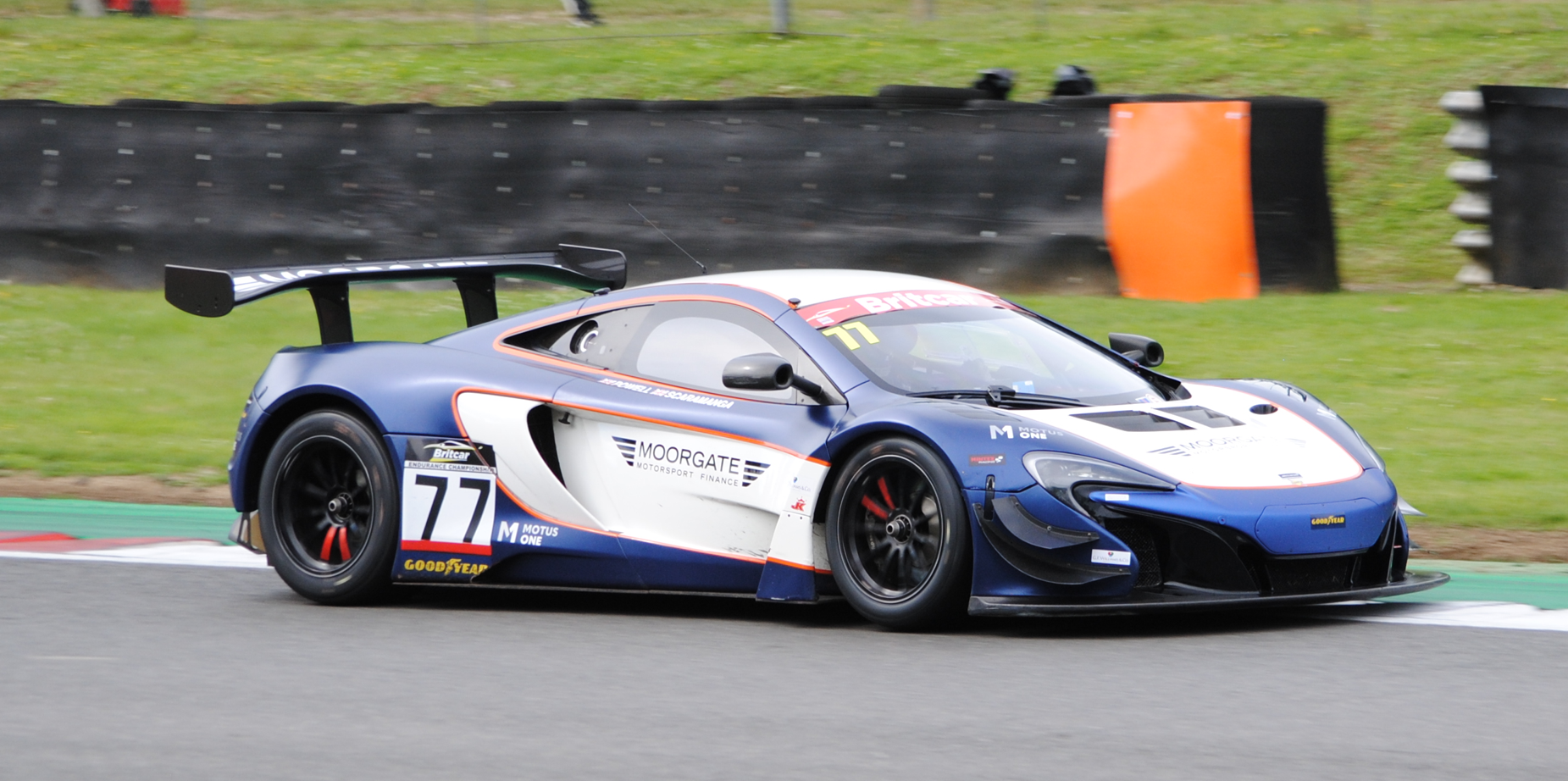
Will Powell and Dave Scaramanga, the overall Endurance and Class 1 champions.

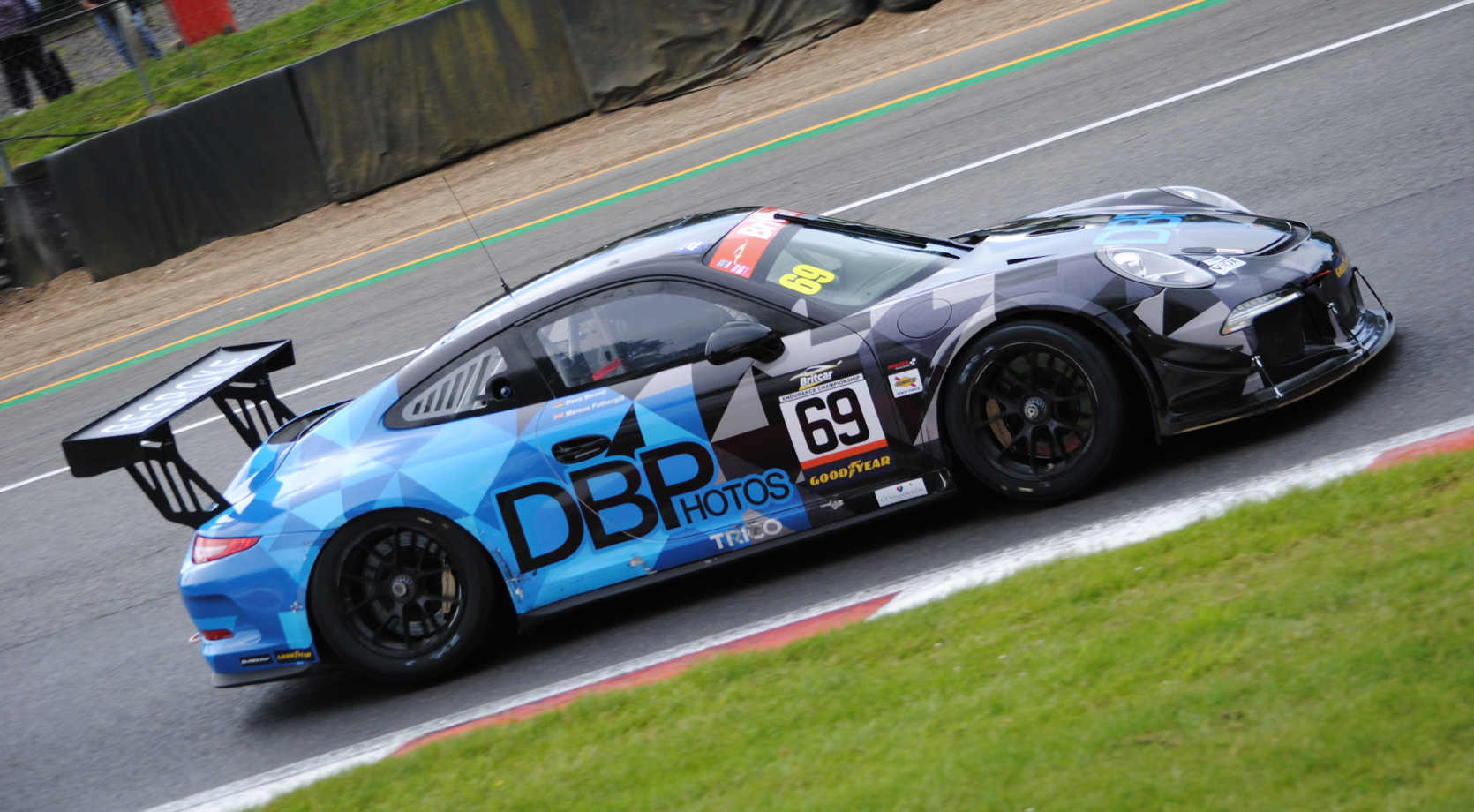
Dave Benett and Marcus Fothergill, the defending Class 3 champions and Class 3 champions.

The 2021 Britcar Endurance Championship (known for sponsorship reasons as the 2021 Goodyear Britcar Endurance Championship) was a motor racing championship for GT cars, touring cars and sportscars held across England. The championship's field consisted of varying types of cars from sportscar to GT and touring cars that competed in four classes, depending on horsepower, momentum, etc. It was the 20th season of a Britcar championship, the 10th run as the Britcar Endurance Championship, and the 1st run as the Goodyear Britcar Endurance Championship. The season began on 24 April at Silverstone Circuit and ended on 14 November at Brands Hatch. This was the first season with the new Praga category, open to all Praga racing cars, which paved the way for a new one-make Praga series in 2022.

== Calendar ==
The first round at Silverstone was initially postponed but rescheduled for 24 April 2021.

Round		Circuit	Length	Date	Supporting
1	1	Silverstone International, Northamptonshire	60 min	24 April	Touring Car Trophy
1	2	Silverstone International, Northamptonshire	60 min	24 April	Touring Car Trophy
2	3	Snetterton Circuit (300), Norfolk	60 min	8 May	
2	4	Snetterton Circuit (300), Norfolk	60 min	8 May	
3	5	Oulton Park, Cheshire	60 min	12 June	
3	6	Oulton Park, Cheshire	60 min	12 June	
4	7	Silverstone GP, Northamptonshire	120 min	3 July	
5	8	Brands Hatch Indy Circuit, Kent	60 min	31 July	
5	9	Brands Hatch Indy Circuit, Kent	60 min	31 July	
6	10	Donington Park GP, Leicestershire	60 min	23 October	
6	11	Donington Park GP, Leicestershire	60 min	23 October	
NC		Brands Hatch Indy Circuit, Kent (Class 4 only)	50 min	13–14 November	
NC		Brands Hatch Indy Circuit, Kent (Class 4 only)	50 min	13–14 November	

== Teams and drivers ==
Cars are assigned classed based on speed, horsepower, momentum, equipment fitted to the car and the car's model;
Praga: Praga racing cars (R1T, R1S)
Class 1: GT3, Sports prototype cars
Class 2: Latest gen Cup; 488 Challenge, cars
Class 3: Older gen cup; 458 Challenge, cars
Class 4: GT4, cup and TCR cars

All teams are British-registered.

Team	Car	No.	Drivers	Rounds
Praga
Team Praga Racing	Praga R1 (Mk5)	7	(United Kingdom) Miles Lacey	2–6
Team Praga Racing	Praga R1 (Mk5)	7	(United Kingdom) James Walker	2–5
CW Performance	Praga R1 (Mk5)	29	(United Kingdom) Richard Morris	All
CW Performance	Praga R1 (Mk5)	29	(United Kingdom) Chris Wesemael	All
Motus One Racing	Praga R1 (Mk5)	31	(United Kingdom) Rod Goodman	1–4, 6
Motus One Racing	Praga R1 (Mk5)	31	(United Kingdom) Elliot Goodman	4
VR Motorsport (Note: Car no. 84 is entered as VR Motorsport and car no. 91 is entered as VR / Stand 2 Motorsport.); VR / Stand 2 Motorsport	Praga R1T Evo	84	(United Kingdom) Chris Bridle	All
VR Motorsport; VR / Stand 2 Motorsport	Praga R1T Evo	84	(United Kingdom) Ed Bridle	All
Praga Race Academy	Praga R1 (Mk5)	85	(United Kingdom) Jay Morton	2–6
Praga Race Academy	Praga R1 (Mk5)	85	(United Kingdom) Angus Fender	2–3
Praga Race Academy	Praga R1 (Mk5)	85	(United Kingdom) Ben Collins	4–6
Team J2 Praga	Praga R1 (Mk5)	87	(United Kingdom) Jimmy Broadbent	All
Team J2 Praga	Praga R1 (Mk5)	87	(United Kingdom) Jem Hepworth	1–5
Team J2 Praga	Praga R1 (Mk5)	87	(United Kingdom) Gordie Mutch	6
Powerhouse Performance by Praga	Praga R1 (Mk5)	91	(United Kingdom) Jack Fabby	All
Powerhouse Performance by Praga	Praga R1 (Mk5)	91	(United Kingdom) Charlie Martin	All
Tim Gray Motorsport	Praga R1T Evo	111	(United Kingdom) Alex Kapadia	All
Tim Gray Motorsport	Praga R1T Evo	111	(United Kingdom) Richard Wells	1–5
Tim Gray Motorsport	Praga R1T Evo	111	(United Kingdom) Tim Gray	6
Team Praga Three Lions	Praga R1 (Mk5)	333	(United Kingdom) Gordie Mutch	1–5
Team Praga Three Lions	Praga R1 (Mk5)	333	(United Kingdom) Abbie Eaton	1–3
Team Praga Three Lions	Praga R1 (Mk5)	333	(United Kingdom) Ash Dibden	3–6
Praga Invitation
VR Motorsport	Praga R1T Evo	24	(United Kingdom) Jem Hepworth	6
Class 1
MacG Racing	Taranis	3	(United Kingdom) Jonny MacGregor	3–4, 6
MacG Racing	Taranis	3	(United Kingdom) Ben Sharich	4, 6
Simpson Motorsport	Lamborghini Huracán GT3	8	(France) Franck Pelle	1
Fox Transport	Nissan GT-R Nismo GT3	23	(United Kingdom) Danny Harrison	1–2, 4–6
Fox Transport	Nissan GT-R Nismo GT3	23	(United Kingdom) Richard Wheeler	1–2, 4–6
JMH Automotive	Lamborghini Huracán GT3 Evo	55	(United Kingdom) John Seale	1–2
JMH Automotive	Lamborghini Huracán GT3 Evo	55	(United Kingdom) Jamie Stanley	1–2
Motus One with Moorgate	McLaren 650S GT3	77	(United Kingdom) Will Powell	All
Motus One with Moorgate	McLaren 650S GT3	77	(United Kingdom) David Scaramanga	All
Class 1 Invitation
Simon Green Motorsport	Lamborghini Huracán GT3 Evo	55	(United Kingdom) Lee Frost	5
Simon Green Motorsport	Lamborghini Huracán GT3 Evo	55	(United Kingdom) Lucky Khera	5
Venture Engineering	Aston Martin Vulcan AMR Pro	76	(Latvia) Gleb Stepanovs	6
Venture Engineering	Aston Martin Vulcan AMR Pro	76	(United Kingdom) Steve Tomkins	6
Class 2
JW Bird Motorsport	Ferrari 488 Challenge	4	(United Kingdom) Craig Davies	1
JW Bird Motorsport	Ferrari 488 Challenge	4	(United Kingdom) Michael Jones	1
Simon Green Motorsport	Ferrari 488 Challenge Evo	24	(United Kingdom) Lucky Khera	1–2
Simon Green Motorsport	Ferrari 488 Challenge Evo	24	(United Kingdom) Ross Wylie	1–2
Class 2 Invitation
Scott Sport	Ferrari 488 Challenge Evo	61	(United Kingdom) John Dhillon	2
Scott Sport	Ferrari 488 Challenge Evo	61	(United Kingdom) Phil Quaife	2
RNR Performance Cars	Dodge Viper Competition Coupe GT3	160	(United Kingdom) Tom Jackson	6
RNR Performance Cars	Dodge Viper Competition Coupe GT3	160	(United Kingdom) Wayne Marrs	6
Class 3
DigiPlat Racing	BMW M3 GTR	6	(United Kingdom) Mark Steward	1–3, 5
DigiPlat Racing	BMW M3 GTR	6	(United Kingdom) Nathan Wells	1–3, 5
Red River Sport by FF Corse	Ferrari 458 Challenge	16	(United Kingdom) Bonamy Grimes	1–2, 4–6
Red River Sport by FF Corse	Ferrari 458 Challenge	16	(United Kingdom) Johnny Mowlem	1–2, 4–6
Woodrow Motorsport	BMW 1M E82	26	(United Kingdom) Kevin Clarke	1–2
Woodrow Motorsport	BMW 1M E82	26	(United Kingdom) Matt Evans	1–2
SG Racing	Porsche 997 Cup	32	(United Kingdom) Mark Cunningham	All
SG Racing	Porsche 997 Cup	32	(United Kingdom) Peter Cunningham	All
Bespoke Cars Racing	Porsche 991 GT3 Cup	69	(New Zealand) Dave Benett	All
Bespoke Cars Racing	Porsche 991 GT3 Cup	69	(United Kingdom) Marcus Fothergill	All
RNR Performance Cars	Ferrari 458 Challenge	144	(United Kingdom) Chris Compton-Goddard	All
RNR Performance Cars	Ferrari 458 Challenge	144	(United Kingdom) Charlie Hollings	All
Class 3 Invitation
Valluga Racing	Ferrari 458 Challenge	51	(United Kingdom) Carl Cavers	6
Valluga Racing	Ferrari 458 Challenge	51	(United Kingdom) Bradley Ellis	6
Class 4
PB Racing	Porsche Cayman GT4 Clubsport MR	9	(New Zealand) Peter Erceg	All
Simon Green Motorsport	Porsche 718 Cayman GT4 Clubsport	13	(United Kingdom) Lee Frost	1
Simon Green Motorsport	Porsche 718 Cayman GT4 Clubsport	13	(United Kingdom) Nathan Hanslip	1
Full Throttle Motorsport	Cupra León TCR	22	(United Kingdom) Richard Avery	1–2, 6
Full Throttle Motorsport	Cupra León TCR	22	(United Kingdom) Nick Hull	1–2, 6
Greystone GT	McLaren 570S GT4	25	(Estonia) Andrey Borodin	2
Greystone GT	McLaren 570S GT4	25	(United Kingdom) Ed Pead	2
Valluga Racing	Porsche 718 Cayman GT4 Clubsport	27	(United Kingdom) Benji Hetherington	NC
Valluga Racing	Porsche 718 Cayman GT4 Clubsport	27	(United Kingdom) Ian Humphries	NC
Valluga Racing	Porsche 718 Cayman GT4 Clubsport	51	(United Kingdom) Carl Cavers	NC
Valluga Racing	Porsche 718 Cayman GT4 Clubsport	51	(Republic of Ireland) Sean Doyle	NC
CTR-Alfatune	Cupra León TCR	44	(United Kingdom) Alex Day	1–4, 6
CTR-Alfatune	Cupra León TCR	44	(United Kingdom) William Foster	1–4, 6
Triple M Automotive	Aston Martin Vantage GT4	38	(United Kingdom) Dale Albutt	1, 3–4, 6
Triple M Automotive	Aston Martin Vantage GT4	38	(United Kingdom) Mark Albutt	1, 3–4, 6
Geoff Steel Racing	BMW M3 GTR	38	(United Kingdom) Sam Allpass	NC
Reflex Racing	Ligier JS2 R	58	(United Kingdom) Luke Davenport	1
Reflex Racing	Ligier JS2 R	58	(United Kingdom) Marcus Vivian	1
Reflex Racing	Ligier JS2 R	58	(United Kingdom) Charlotte Birch	6
Reflex Racing	Ligier JS2 R	58	(United Kingdom) Jamie Vinall-Meyer	6
EDF Motorsports	Cupra León TCR	60	(United Kingdom) Martin Byford	All
EDF Motorsports	Cupra León TCR	60	(United Kingdom) Ashley Woodman	All
Team AFM Racing	Cupra León TCR	63	(United Kingdom) Mark Hayes	4, 6
Team AFM Racing	Cupra León TCR	63	(United Kingdom) Rick Kerry	4, 6
Motus One Racing	Cupra León TCR	66	(United Kingdom) Danny Krywyj	1, 3
Motus One Racing	Cupra León TCR	66	(United Kingdom) Miles Lacey	1
Motus One Racing	Cupra León TCR	66	(Republic of Ireland) Nicole Draught	3
Motus One Racing	Hyundai i30 N TCR	66	(Republic of Ireland) Nicole Draught	4–5
Motus One Racing	Hyundai i30 N TCR	66	(United Kingdom) Danny Krywyj	4–5
Team BRIT	Aston Martin Vantage GT4	68	(United Kingdom) Aaron Morgan	All
Team BRIT	Aston Martin Vantage GT4	68	(United Kingdom) Bobby Trundley	All
Team HARD.	Ginetta G55 GT4	68	(United Kingdom) Eric Boulton	NC
Whitebridge Motorsport	Aston Martin Vantage AMR GT4	72	(United Kingdom) Chris Murphy	1, 4
Maximum Motorsport	Volkswagen Golf GTI TCR	78	(United Kingdom) Tim Docker	1, 3
Maximum Motorsport	Cupra León TCR	78	(United Kingdom) Tim Docker	2
Maximum Motorsport	Ginetta G55 Supercup	95	(United Kingdom) Stewart Lines	1
Newbarn Racing	Jaguar F-Type S	88	(United Kingdom) Adam Thompson	2–4
Newbarn Racing	Jaguar F-Type S	88	(United Kingdom) Callum Thompson	2–4
Paul Sheard Motorsport	SEAT León TCR	99	(United Kingdom) Jonathan Beeson	1
Paul Sheard Motorsport	SEAT León TCR	99	(United Kingdom) George Heler	1
Paul Sheard Motorsport	Volkswagen Golf GTI TCR	99	(United Kingdom) Jonathan Beeson	2–6
Paul Sheard Motorsport	Volkswagen Golf GTI TCR	99	(United Kingdom) George Heler	3–6
RNR Performance Cars	Maserati Granturismo MC GT4	108	(United Kingdom) Richard Dougal	1
RNR Performance Cars	Maserati Granturismo MC GT4	108	(United Kingdom) Vance Kearney	1
Simpson Motorsport	Audi RS3 LMS TCR	138	(United Kingdom) Hugo Cook	All
Simpson Motorsport	Audi RS3 LMS TCR	138	(United Kingdom) Sacha Kakad	All
Class 4 Invitation
Valour Racing	Aston Martin Vantage GT4	73	(United Kingdom) Mike Coker	4

== Race results ==
Bold indicates overall winner.

Round		Circuit	Pole position	Fastest lap	Winning PC	Winning C1	Winning C2	Winning C3	Winning C4
1	R1	Silverstone International	No. 55 JMH Automotive	No. 55 JMH Automotive	No. 91 Powerhouse Performance by Praga	**No. 55 JMH Automotive**	No. 24 Simon Green Motorsport	No. 16 Red River Sport by FF Corse	No. 44 CTR-Alfatune
1	R1	Silverstone International	(United Kingdom) John Seale (United Kingdom) Jamie Stanley	(United Kingdom) John Seale (United Kingdom) Jamie Stanley	(United Kingdom) Jack Fabby (United Kingdom) Charlie Martin	**(United Kingdom) John Seale** **(United Kingdom) Jamie Stanley**	(United Kingdom) Lucky Khera (United Kingdom) Ross Wylie	(United Kingdom) Bonamy Grimes (United Kingdom) Johnny Mowlem	(United Kingdom) Alex Day (United Kingdom) William Foster
1	R2	Silverstone International		No. 55 JMH Automotive	No. 333 Team Praga Three Lions	**No. 55 JMH Automotive**	No finishers	No. 16 Red River Sport by FF Corse	No. 138 Simpson Motorsport
1	R2	Silverstone International		(United Kingdom) John Seale (United Kingdom) Jamie Stanley	(United Kingdom) Abbie Eaton (United Kingdom) Gordie Mutch	**(United Kingdom) John Seale** **(United Kingdom) Jamie Stanley**	No finishers	(United Kingdom) Bonamy Grimes (United Kingdom) Johnny Mowlem	(United Kingdom) Hugo Cook (United Kingdom) Sacha Kakad
2	R3	Snetterton 300	No. 23 Fox Transport	No. 55 JMH Automotive	No. 29 CW Performance	No. 55 JMH Automotive	**No. 61 Scott Sport**	No. 16 Red River Sport by FF Corse	No. 60 EDF Motorsports
2	R3	Snetterton 300	(United Kingdom) Danny Harrison (United Kingdom) Richard Wheeler	(United Kingdom) John Seale (United Kingdom) Jamie Stanley	(United Kingdom) Richard Morris (United Kingdom) Chris Wesemael	(United Kingdom) John Seale (United Kingdom) Jamie Stanley	**(United Kingdom) John Dhillon** **(United Kingdom) Phil Quaife**	(United Kingdom) Bonamy Grimes (United Kingdom) Johnny Mowlem	(United Kingdom) Martin Byford (United Kingdom) Ashley Woodman
2	R4	Snetterton 300	No. 16 Red River Sport by FF Corse	No. 55 JMH Automotive	No. 29 CW Performance	**No. 55 JMH Automotive**	No. 61 Scott Sport	No. 16 Red River Sport by FF Corse	No. 68 Team BRIT
2	R4	Snetterton 300	(United Kingdom) Bonamy Grimes (United Kingdom) Johnny Mowlem	(United Kingdom) John Seale (United Kingdom) Jamie Stanley	(United Kingdom) Richard Morris (United Kingdom) Chris Wesemael	**(United Kingdom) John Seale** **(United Kingdom) Jamie Stanley**	(United Kingdom) John Dhillon (United Kingdom) Phil Quaife	(United Kingdom) Bonamy Grimes (United Kingdom) Johnny Mowlem	(United Kingdom) Aaron Morgan (United Kingdom) Bobby Trundley
3	R5	Oulton Park	No. 111 Tim Gray Motorsport	No. 111 Tim Gray Motorsport	**No. 85 Praga Race Academy**	No. 77 Motus One with Moorgate	No entries	No. 144 RNR Performance Cars	No. 68 Team BRIT
3	R5	Oulton Park	(United Kingdom) Alex Kapadia (United Kingdom) Richard Wells	(United Kingdom) Alex Kapadia (United Kingdom) Richard Wells	**(United Kingdom) Angus Fender** **(United Kingdom) Jay Morton**	(United Kingdom) Will Powell (United Kingdom) David Scaramanga	No entries	(United Kingdom) Chris Compton-Goddard (United Kingdom) Charlie Hollings	(United Kingdom) Aaron Morgan (United Kingdom) Bobby Trundley
3	R6	Oulton Park	No. 111 Tim Gray Motorsport	No. 111 Tim Gray Motorsport	**No. 85 Praga Race Academy**	No. 77 Motus One with Moorgate	No entries	No. 144 RNR Performance Cars	No. 60 EDF Motorsports
3	R6	Oulton Park	(United Kingdom) Alex Kapadia (United Kingdom) Richard Wells	(United Kingdom) Alex Kapadia (United Kingdom) Richard Wells	**(United Kingdom) Angus Fender** **(United Kingdom) Jay Morton**	(United Kingdom) Will Powell (United Kingdom) David Scaramanga	No entries	(United Kingdom) Chris Compton-Goddard (United Kingdom) Charlie Hollings	(United Kingdom) Martin Byford (United Kingdom) Ashley Woodman
4	R7	Silverstone GP	No. 111 Tim Gray Motorsport	No. 111 Tim Gray Motorsport	**No. 29 CW Performance**	No. 77 Motus One with Moorgate	No entries	No. 16 Red River Sport by FF Corse	No. 66 Motus One Racing
4	R7	Silverstone GP	(United Kingdom) Alex Kapadia (United Kingdom) Richard Wells	(United Kingdom) Alex Kapadia (United Kingdom) Richard Wells	**(United Kingdom) Richard Morris** **(United Kingdom) Chris Wesemael**	(United Kingdom) Will Powell (United Kingdom) David Scaramanga	No entries	(United Kingdom) Bonamy Grimes (United Kingdom) Johnny Mowlem	(Republic of Ireland) Nicole Draught (United Kingdom) Danny Krywyj
5	R8	Brands Hatch Indy	Races cancelled due to support race fatality.						
5	R9	Brands Hatch Indy	Races cancelled due to support race fatality.						
6	R10	Donington Park GP	No. 111 Tim Gray Motorsport	No. 87 Team J2 Praga	**No. 87 Team J2 Praga**	No. 3 MacG Racing	No. 160 RNR Performance Cars	No. 144 RNR Performance Cars	No. 9 PB Racing
6	R10	Donington Park GP	(United Kingdom) Tim Gray (United Kingdom) Richard Wells	(United Kingdom) Jimmy Broadbent (United Kingdom) Gordie Mutch	**(United Kingdom) Jimmy Broadbent** **(United Kingdom) Gordie Mutch**	(United Kingdom) Jonny MacGregor	(United Kingdom) Tom Jackson (United Kingdom) Wayne Marrs	(United Kingdom) Chris Compton-Goddard (United Kingdom) Charlie Hollings	(New Zealand) Peter Erceg
6	R11	Donington Park GP	No. 111 Tim Gray Motorsport	No. 111 Tim Gray Motorsport	**No. 87 Team J2 Praga**	No. 77 Motus One with Moorgate	No. 160 RNR Performance Cars	No. 16 Red River Sport by FF Corse	No. 58 Reflex Racing
6	R11	Donington Park GP	(United Kingdom) Tim Gray (United Kingdom) Richard Wells	(United Kingdom) Tim Gray (United Kingdom) Richard Wells	**(United Kingdom) Jimmy Broadbent** **(United Kingdom) Gordie Mutch**	(United Kingdom) Will Powell (United Kingdom) David Scaramanga	(United Kingdom) Tom Jackson (United Kingdom) Wayne Marrs	(United Kingdom) Bonamy Grimes (United Kingdom) Johnny Mowlem	(United Kingdom) Charlotte Birch (United Kingdom) Jamie Vinall-Meyer
NC		Brands Hatch Indy			Did not participate				

=== Overall championship standings ===
Points are awarded as follows in all classes:

System	1st	2nd	3rd	4th	5th	6th	7th	8th	9th	10th	11th	12th	13th	14th	15th	R1 PP	FL
+2	30	27	25	20	19	18	17	16	15	14	13	12	11	10	9	1	1

System	1st	2nd	PP	FL
-2	20	17	1	1

Pos.	Drivers	No.	Class	SIL1		SNE		OUL		SIL2	BRH		DON		Pts
Praga
1	(United Kingdom) Richard Wells	111	1	4	6	18	**25**	**2**	**3**	**3**	**C**	**C**	**11**	**2**	216
1	(United Kingdom) Alex Kapadia	111	1	4	6	18	**25**	**2**	**3**	**3**	**C**	**C**			216
1	(United Kingdom) Tim Gray	111	1										**11**	**2**	216
2	(United Kingdom) Richard Morris (United Kingdom) Chris Wesemael	29	1	3	23	5	3	3	21	1	C	C	Ret	3	201
3	(United Kingdom) Jack Fabby (United Kingdom) Charlie Martin	91	1	2	4	6	Ret	4	4	2	C	C	4	4	191
4	(United Kingdom) Chris Bridle (United Kingdom) Ed Bridle	84	1	27	11	9	7	8	6	27	C	C	3	7	184
5	(United Kingdom) Jimmy Broadbent	87	1	6	8	Ret	10	23	12	6	C	C	1	1	171
5	(United Kingdom) Jem Hepworth	87	1	6	8	Ret	10	23	12	6	C	C			171
5	(United Kingdom) Gordie Mutch	87	1										1	1	171
6	(United Kingdom) Ron Goodman	31	1	30	9	10	8	6	Ret	4			13	DNS	138
7	(United Kingdom) Jay Morton	85	1			20	11	1	1	8	C	C	Ret	20	132
7	(United Kingdom) Angus Fender	85	1			20	11	1	1						132
7	(United Kingdom) Ben Collins	85	1							8	C	C	Ret	20	132
8	(United Kingdom) Gordie Mutch	333	1	**26**	2	**21**	Ret	22	2	11	C	C			131
8	(United Kingdom) Abbie Eaton	333	1	**26**	2	**21**	Ret	22	2						131
8	(United Kingdom) Ash Dibden	333	1					22	2	11	C	C	Ret	Ret	131
9	(United Kingdom) Miles Lacey	7	1			DNS	9	10	8	21	C	C	2	Ret	71
9	(United Kingdom) James Walker	7	1			DNS	9	10	8	21	C	C			71
drivers ineligible for points
–	(United Kingdom) Jem Hepworth	24	Inv										Ret	DNS	0
Endurance
1	(United Kingdom) Will Powell (United Kingdom) David Scaramanga	77	1	10	5	7	5	**5**	**5**	5	C	C	**6**	5	229
2	(New Zealand) Peter Erceg	9	4	16	15	12	17	19	14	25	C	C	12	15	203
3	(United Kingdom) Martin Byford (United Kingdom) Ashley Woodman	60	4	25	Ret	8	15	12	11	17	C	C	15	16	196
4	(United Kingdom) Aaron Morgan (United Kingdom) Bobby Trundley	68	4	19	14	11	13	11	Ret	23	C	C	18	17	194
5	(United Kingdom) Alex Day (United Kingdom) William Foster	44	4	11	18	14	22	18	13	19			16	13	193
=	(New Zealand) Dave Benett (United Kingdom) Marcus Fothergill	69	3	14	21	22	21	13	16	13	C	C	Ret	22	193
7	(United Kingdom) Bonamy Grimes (United Kingdom) Johnny Mowlem	16	3	9	10	3	**4**			7	C	C	Ret	6	189
8	(United Kingdom) Chris Compton-Goddard (United Kingdom) Charlie Hollings	144	3	29	Ret	15	12	9	9	16	C	C	21	Ret	188
9	(United Kingdom) Mark Cunningham (United Kingdom) Peter Cunningham	32	3	13	16	DNS	16	14	10	10	C	C	22	DNS	178
10	(United Kingdom) Danny Harrison (United Kingdom) Richard Wheeler	23	1	5	3	**4**	2			**9**	C	C	8	Ret	162
=	(United Kingdom) Hugo Cook (United Kingdom) Sacha Kakad	138	4	12	13	26	18	15	20	14	C	C	Ret	Ret	162
12	(United Kingdom) John Seale (United Kingdom) Jamie Stanley	55	1	**1**	1	2	1								125
13	(United Kingdom) Dale Albutt (United Kingdom) Mark Albutt	38	4	24	22			16	15	20			20	17	121
14	(United Kingdom) Jonathan Beeson	99	4	Ret	DNS	17	Ret	20	17	15	C	C	14	21	119
14	(United Kingdom) George Heler	99	4	Ret	DNS			20	17	15	C	C	14	21	119
15	(United Kingdom) Jonny MacGregor	3	1					7	7	22			5	8	116
15	(United Kingdom) Ben Sharich	3	1							22					116
16	(United Kingdom) Richard Avery (United Kingdom) Nick Hull	22	4	23	17	19	23						19	18	101
17	(United Kingdom) Tim Docker	78	4	18	Ret	16	19	17	19						92
18	(United Kingdom) Mark Steward (United Kingdom) Nathan Wells	6	3	21	Ret	24	Ret	21	18		C	C			79
19	(United Kingdom) Kevin Clarke (United Kingdom) Matty Evans	26	3	DNS	12	23	14								72
20	(United Kingdom) Luke Davenport (United Kingdom) Marcus Vivian	58	4	Ret	DNS										52
20	(United Kingdom) Charlotte Birch (United Kingdom) Jamie Vinall-Meyer	58	4										17	12	52
=	(United Kingdom) Chris Murphy	72	4	20	20					18					52
22	(United Kingdom) Danny Krywyj	66	4	17	Ret			DNS	DNS	12	C	C			49
22	(United Kingdom) Miles Lacey	66	4	17	Ret										49
22	(Republic of Ireland) Nicole Draught	66	4					DNS	DNS	12	C	C			49
23	(United Kingdom) Adam Thompson (United Kingdom) Callum Thompson	88	4	WD	WD	25	24	Ret	DNS	24					45
=	(France) Franck Pelle	8	1	7	7										45
25	(United Kingdom) Lee Frost (United Kingdom) Nathan Hanslip	13	4	15	19										43
26	(Estonia) Andrey Borodin (United Kingdom) Ed Pead	25	4			13	20								38
27	(United Kingdom) Mark Havers (United Kingdom) Rick Kerry	4	63							26			DNS	19	29
28	(United Kingdom) Lucky Khera (United Kingdom) Ross Wylie	24	2	8	DNS	DNS	DNS								23
29	(United Kingdom) Craig Davies (United Kingdom) Michael Jones	4	2	22	Ret										17
30	(United Kingdom) Stewart Lines	95	4	28	Ret										12
–	(United Kingdom) Richard Dougal (United Kingdom) Vance Kearney	108	4	Ret	DNS										0
drivers ineligible for points
–	(United Kingdom) John Dhillon (United Kingdom) Phil Quaife	61	2Inv			1	6								0
–	(Latvia) Gleb Stepanovs (United Kingdom) Steve Tomkins	76	1Inv										7	11	0
–	(United Kingdom) Carl Cavers (United Kingdom) Lewis Plato	51	3Inv										9	9	0
–	(United Kingdom) Tom Jackson (United Kingdom) Wayne Marrs	160	2Inv										10	10	0
–	(United Kingdom) Mike Coker	73	4Inv							28					0
	(United Kingdom) Lee Frost (United Kingdom) Lucky Khera	24	1Inv								**C**	**C**			
Pos.	Drivers	No.	Class	SIL1		SNE		OUL		SIL2	BRH		DON		Pts

Key
Colour	Result
Gold	Winner
Silver	Second place
Bronze	Third place
Green	Other points position
Blue	Other classified position
Blue	Not classified, finished (NC)
Purple	Not classified, retired (Ret)
Red	Did not qualify (DNQ)
Red	Did not pre-qualify (DNPQ)
Black	Disqualified (DSQ)
White	Did not start (DNS)
White	Race cancelled (C)
Blank	Did not practice (DNP)
Blank	Excluded (EX)
Blank	Did not arrive (DNA)
Blank	Withdrawn (WD)
Blank	Did not enter (cell empty)
Text formatting	Meaning
**Bold**	Pole position
Italics	Fastest lap

=== Class championship standings ===
Points are awarded as follows in all classes:

System	1st	2nd	3rd	4th	5th	6th	7th	8th	9th	10th	11th	12th	13th	14th	15th	R1 PP	FL
+2	30	27	25	20	19	18	17	16	15	14	13	12	11	10	9	1	1

System	1st	2nd	PP	FL
-2	20	17	1	1

Pos.	Drivers	No.	SIL1		SNE		OUL		SIL2	BRH		DON		Pts
Praga
1	(United Kingdom) Richard Wells	111	4	6	18	**25**	**2**	**3**	**3**	**C**	**C**	**11**	**2**	216
1	(United Kingdom) Alex Kapadia	111	4	6	18	**25**	**2**	**3**	**3**	**C**	**C**			216
1	(United Kingdom) Tim Gray	111										**11**	**2**	216
2	(United Kingdom) Richard Morris (United Kingdom) Chris Wesemael	29	3	23	5	3	3	21	1	C	C	Ret	3	201
3	(United Kingdom) Jack Fabby (United Kingdom) Charlie Martin	91	2	4	6	Ret	4	4	2	C	C	4	4	191
4	(United Kingdom) Chris Bridle (United Kingdom) Ed Bridle	84	27	11	9	7	8	6	27	C	C	3	7	184
5	(United Kingdom) Jimmy Broadbent	87	6	8	Ret	10	23	12	6	C	C	1	1	171
5	(United Kingdom) Jem Hepworth	87	6	8	Ret	10	23	12	6	C	C			171
5	(United Kingdom) Gordie Mutch	87										1	1	171
6	(United Kingdom) Ron Goodman	31	30	9	10	8	6	Ret	4			13	DNS	138
7	(United Kingdom) Jay Morton	85			20	11	1	1	8	C	C	Ret	20	121
7	(United Kingdom) Angus Fender	85			20	11	1	1						121
7	(United Kingdom) Ben Collins	85							8	C	C	Ret	20	121
8	(United Kingdom) Gordie Mutch	333	**26**	2	**21**	Ret	22	2	11	C	C			131
8	(United Kingdom) Abbie Eaton	333	**26**	2	**21**	Ret	22	2						131
8	(United Kingdom) Ash Dibden	333					22	2	11	C	C	Ret	Ret	131
9	(United Kingdom) Miles Lacey	7			DNS	9	10	8	21	C	C	2	Ret	71
9	(United Kingdom) James Walker	7			DNS	9	10	8	21	C	C			71
drivers ineligible for points
–	(United Kingdom) Jem Hepworth	24										Ret	DNS	0
Class 1
1	(United Kingdom) Will Powell (United Kingdom) David Scaramanga	77	10	5	7	5	**5**	**5**	5	C	C	**6**	**5**	229
2	(United Kingdom) Danny Harrison (United Kingdom) Richard Wheeler	23	5	3	**4**	**2**			**9**	C	C	8	Ret	162
3	(United Kingdom) John Seale (United Kingdom) Jamie Stanley	55	**1**	1	2	1								125
4	(United Kingdom) Jonny MacGregor	3					7	7	22			5	8	116
4	(United Kingdom) Ben Sharich	3							22					116
5	(France) Franck Pelle	8	7	7										45
drivers ineligible for points
–	(Latvia) Gleb Stepanovs (United Kingdom) Steve Tomkins	76										7	11	0
	(United Kingdom) Lee Frost (United Kingdom) Lucky Khera	24								**C**	**C**			
Class 2
1	(United Kingdom) Lucky Khera (United Kingdom) Ross Wylie	24	**8**	DNS	**DNS**	**DNS**								23
2	(United Kingdom) Craig Davies (United Kingdom) Michael Jones	4	22	Ret										17
drivers ineligible for points
–	(United Kingdom) John Dhillon (United Kingdom) Phil Quaife	61			1	6								0
–	(United Kingdom) Tom Jackson (United Kingdom) Wayne Marrs	160										**10**	**10**	0
Class 3
1	(New Zealand) Dave Benett (United Kingdom) Marcus Fothergill	69	14	21	22	21	13	16	13	C	C	Ret	22	193
2	(United Kingdom) Bonamy Grimes (United Kingdom) Johnny Mowlem	16	**9**	10	**3**	**4**			**7**	**C**	**C**	**Ret**	**6**	189
3	(United Kingdom) Chris Compton-Goddard (United Kingdom) Charlie Hollings	144	29	Ret	15	12	**9**	**9**	16	C	C	21	Ret	188
4	(United Kingdom) Mark Cunningham (United Kingdom) Peter Cunningham	32	13	16	DNS	16	14	10	10	C	C	22	DNS	178
5	(United Kingdom) Mark Steward (United Kingdom) Nathan Wells	6	21	Ret	24	Ret	21	18		C	C			79
6	(United Kingdom) Kevin Clarke (United Kingdom) Matty Evans	26	DNS	12	23	14								72
drivers ineligible for points
–	(United Kingdom) Carl Cavers (United Kingdom) Lewis Plato	51										9	9	0
Class 4
1	(New Zealand) Peter Erceg	9	16	15	12	17	19	14	25	C	C	12	15	202
2	(United Kingdom) Martin Byford (United Kingdom) Ashley Woodman	60	25	Ret	**8**	**15**	12	**11**	17	C	C	15	16	196
3	(United Kingdom) Aaron Morgan (United Kingdom) Bobby Trundley	68	19	14	11	13	**11**	Ret	23	**C**	**C**	**18**	**15**	194
4	(United Kingdom) Alex Day (United Kingdom) William Foster	44	11	18	14	22	18	13	19			16	13	193
5	(United Kingdom) Hugo Cook (United Kingdom) Sacha Kakad	138	12	13	26	18	15	20	**14**	C	C	Ret	Ret	162
6	(United Kingdom) Dale Albutt (United Kingdom) Mark Albutt	38	24	22			16	15	20			18	17	121
7	(United Kingdom) Jonathan Beeson	99	Ret	DNS	17	Ret	20	17	15	C	C	14	21	119
7	(United Kingdom) George Heler	99	Ret	DNS			20	17	15	C	C	14	21	119
8	(United Kingdom) Richard Avery (United Kingdom) Nick Hull	22	23	17	19	23						19	18	101
9	(United Kingdom) Tim Docker	78	18	Ret	16	19	17	19						92
10	(United Kingdom) Luke Davenport (United Kingdom) Marcus Vivian	58	**Ret**	DNS										52
10	(United Kingdom) Charlotte Birch (United Kingdom) Jamie Vinall-Meyer	58										17	12	52
11	(United Kingdom) Chris Murphy	72	20	20					18					52
12	(United Kingdom) Danny Krywyj	66	17	Ret			DNS	DNS	12	C	C			49
12	(United Kingdom) Miles Lacey	66	17	Ret										49
12	(Republic of Ireland) Nicole Draught	66					DNS	DNS	12	C	C			49
13	(United Kingdom) Lee Frost (United Kingdom) Nathan Hanslip	13	15	19										43
14	(Estonia) Andrey Borodin (United Kingdom) Ed Pead	25			13	20								38
15	(United Kingdom) Adam Thompson (United Kingdom) Callum Thompson	88	WD	WD	25	24	Ret	DNS	24					30
16	(United Kingdom) Mark Havers (United Kingdom) Rick Kerry	63							26			DNS	19	29
17	(United Kingdom) Stewart Lines	95	28	Ret										12
–	(United Kingdom) Richard Dougal (United Kingdom) Vance Kearney	108	Ret	DNS										0
drivers ineligible for points
–	(United Kingdom) Mike Coker	73							28					0
Pos.	Drivers	No.	SIL1		SNE		OUL		SIL2	BRH		DON		Pts

Key
Colour	Result
Gold	Winner
Silver	Second place
Bronze	Third place
Green	Other points position
Blue	Other classified position
Blue	Not classified, finished (NC)
Purple	Not classified, retired (Ret)
Red	Did not qualify (DNQ)
Red	Did not pre-qualify (DNPQ)
Black	Disqualified (DSQ)
White	Did not start (DNS)
White	Race cancelled (C)
Blank	Did not practice (DNP)
Blank	Excluded (EX)
Blank	Did not arrive (DNA)
Blank	Withdrawn (WD)
Blank	Did not enter (cell empty)
Text formatting	Meaning
**Bold**	Pole position
Italics	Fastest lap
