= Charlie Martin (racing driver, born 1981) =

British racing car driver

- Born: Leicester, United Kingdom
- Education: Nottingham Trent University
- Occupation: Racing Driver
- Known for: Motorsport Ginetta GT5 Challenge Britcar Michelin Le Mans Cup

Charlie Christina Martin is a British racing driver and transgender rights activist, who competes in endurance racing and last raced in the Lamborghini Super Trofeo Europe, moving from the North America tournament. In 2021, she participated in the Britcar Championship, and has raced in the Nürburgring 24 Hours. She was born in Leicester, United Kingdom.

== Career ==
=== European Hillclimb ===
Martin graduated from Nottingham Trent University in 2004. Martin began her career in 2006 in the Hillclimb Leaders Championship, part of the British Hill Climb Championship racing a Peugeot 205 before moving on to race in the European Hill Climb Championship in 2014, driving a Formula Renault and a Norma Auto Concept M20FC prototype. Martin has competed in the Trophee Tourisme Endurance in November 2017 alongside French racer Nicolas Schatz, claiming third place on her debut endurance outing at Bugatti Circuit.

In 2017, Martin raced in the annual Race of Remembrance, an endurance event that raises money for the Mission Motorsport charity. Racing as part of the PT Sportscars team, Martin finished second in Class B.

=== Ginetta GT5 Challenge ===
In 2018, Martin joined the Richardson Racing team to compete in the Ginetta GT5 Challenge, the official support category to the British GT Championship. During the season, she also completed her first test of LMP3 endurance racing machinery at Circuit de Chambley with the Racing Experience team in a Ligier JSP3 car. In July 2018, Martin was announced as a member of the Electric Production Car Series Drivers’ Club.

=== Michelin Le Mans Cup ===
On 28 February 2019, Martin announced that she would be competing in the 2019 Michelin Le Mans Cup. This marks her prototype racing debut, joining Luxembourgish brothers Gary and David Hauser on the Racing Experience team. Martin would compete in a 5-litre 420 bhp Norma M30 LMP3 car.

Martin and her team finished in fourth place in her series debut at Circuit Paul Ricard

=== VLN ===
On 18 March 2020, Martin announced that she would compete in the German VLN Championship, which will include her first 24-hour race, during the 2020 24 Hours of Nürburgring. She drove a BMW M240i in the series for the Adrenalin Motorsport team and became the first transgender person to compete in the 24 Hours of Nürburgring - securing a fourth-place finish in her class on her debut in the race. Martin's car completed a total of 70 laps with an average speed of 73.600 km/h during the race.

=== Britcar ===
On 23 September 2020, it was announced that Martin had signed to race with Praga to participate in the 2021 Britcar Endurance Championship, racing their R1 Mk5 prototype car.

== Formula E ==
On 15 April 2020, Martin took part in FIA Formula E's online press conference to announce the “Race at Home Challenge” eSports Championship, which will see drivers from the all-electric series lining up in a competition against gamers to raise money for UNICEF.

Martin would be a permanent guest driver for the “Race at Home Challenge” series, which will offer the winner a chance to test a Formula E car at a future real-world race event. The Challenge will take place on the rFactor 2 platform.

As such, Martin is the first transgender driver to be affiliated with FIA Formula E and joins a host of other female drivers who have either competed in the series or who have participated in test events.

=== British Vogue Magazine ===
Martin was included in the 2021 Vogue 25, celebrating the extraordinary women shaping 2021 and beyond.

Martin subsequently appeared in Vogue Magazine's Forces For Change campaign with BMW, in the November 2023 issue of the magazine.

== Personal life ==
Martin is the great-granddaughter of engineer Percy Martin, and is a part-owner of the machine tool company that he founded in 1921.

Martin is transgender and has used her status as a prominent racing driver to raise awareness of LGBT and transgender rights. She was influenced by trans model Caroline Cossey, saying "She was a real trailblazer for the trans community and I remember it clear as day. It was a huge 'eureka' moment of 'this is what I need to do'. I was only about seven."

During the 2018 Ginetta GT5 Challenge and British GT round at Silverstone, Martin led a campaign for drivers to run with rainbow stickers on their cars in order to mark Pride Month and to show support for equality and diversity in the industry.

Martin has called for the normalisation of LGBT representation in motorsport as part of the greater drive towards gender equality in racing. Speaking to Motor Sport in June 2018 about her bid to become the first transgender racing driver to race in 24 Hours of Le Mans she commented: "People will say it shouldn’t be a big deal that a driver is transgender but I think it’s important that people in those positions should be visible. People from the LGBT community are in all sports and all walks of life, and they inspire and encourage others."

Martin was announced as Stonewall’s first Sports Ambassador as part of the charity’s Rainbow Laces campaign, joining celebrity ambassadors such as Alan Carr, Nicole Scherzinger and Paris Lees in representing the charity.

Martin also became the first-ever racing driver to join Athlete Ally’s ambassador programme, partnering with the charity in May 2019 and saying: "I hope to show that a career in motorsport is possible regardless of gender identity. There is a place for everyone in the sporting community and that is as much the case in the pitlane as on the golf course or on a football field."

In June 2019, Martin was announced as an ambassador for Racing Pride – an initiative developed in partnership with Stonewall UK to promote LGBT+ inclusivity within the motorsport industry and among its technological and commercial partners.

Martin has been an active vlogger on transgender rights on her YouTube Channel, Girl For All Seasons (now rebranded to GoCharlie). She has collaborated with other vloggers, such as Fox Fisher and Owl and My Genderation to support their #TransAND campaign, as well as partnering with Childline for their Voice Box series.

In 2017, Martin competed in Series 3 of Ninja Warrior UK, completing the course with a time of 03:03. The show aired on 28 January 2017, drawing an audience of 3.87 million viewers.
