= 2018 24H Series =

The 2018 24H Series may refer to:

- 2018 24H GT Series
- 2018 24H TCE Series
- 2018 24H Proto Series
