= 2004 Renault Clio Cup United Kingdom =

The 2004 Elf Renault Clio Cup United Kingdom season began at Thruxton on 10 April and finished after 20 races over 10 events at Donington Park on 26 September. The Championship was won by Paul Rivett driving for Boulevard Team Racing.

The season was marred by the death of Kevin Lloyd at the May Thruxton meeting.

== Teams & Drivers ==
All competitors raced in Renault Clio Cup 182s.

Team	No.	Drivers	Rounds
Total Control Racing	1	(United Kingdom) Nick Adcock	All
Total Control Racing	3	(United Kingdom) Jonathan Adam	All
Total Control Racing	44	(United Kingdom) Andy Neate	10
Mardi Gras Motorsport	2	(United Kingdom) Ed Pead	All
Mardi Gras Motorsport	8	(United Kingdom) Fulvio Mussi	All
Boulevard Team Racing	10	(United Kingdom) Rob Cullum	1-5
Boulevard Team Racing	22	(United Kingdom) Paul Rivett	All
Boulevard Team Racing	27	(United Kingdom) Martin Johnson	All
Boulevard Team Racing	28	(United Kingdom) Jim Edwards Jr.	5-10
Boulevard Team Racing	41	(United Kingdom) Alex Kapadia	10
Team Griffin Racing	4	(United Kingdom) Matt Allison	All
Team Griffin Racing	5	(United Kingdom) Neil Waterworth	All
Mark Davies Motorsport	6	(United Kingdom) Mark Davies	1-8
Kal-Tec	7	(United Kingdom) Kevin Lloyd	1-5
Aurok Motorsport	9	(United Kingdom) Tom Onslow-Cole	All
Aurok Motorsport	17	(United Kingdom) Ben Winrow	10
Aurok Motorsport	38	(United Kingdom) Steve Wood	All
Aurok Motorsport	41	(United Kingdom) Natalie Barratt	3
Aurok Motorsport	66	(United Kingdom) Matt Nicoll-Jones	1-5
Aurok Motorsport	66	(United Kingdom) Daniel Welch	7
Team Gatecrasher	11	(United Kingdom) Steven Hunter	All
Martin Motorsport	16	(United Kingdom) Vince Martin	1–7, 9
Tim Sugden Motorsport	19	(United Kingdom) Mike Simpson	1, 3, 5-10
Tim Sugden Motorsport	19	(United Kingdom) Rommel Jeffers	2, 4
SRE Motorsport	25	(United Kingdom) Rowland Harcourt	1-3
SRE Motorsport	25	(United Kingdom) Barry Sime	4–7, 9-10
Stancombe Vehicle Engineering	30	(Republic of Ireland) Karl Leonard	1–2, 4
Stancombe Vehicle Engineering	30	(United Kingdom) Colin Stancombe	3
VLR	34	(United Kingdom) Daryl McDonald	1-6
VLR	34	(United Kingdom) Jack Anderson	8-10
Driver	50	(United Kingdom) Phil Grinsell	10
SpeedEquipe	77	(United Kingdom) Richard Williams	All
SpeedEquipe	88	(United Kingdom) Ian Curley	All
SpeedEquipe	99	(United Kingdom) Mark Hunt	10

== Season Calendar ==
All races were held in the United Kingdom.

Round		Circuit	Date	Pole position	Fastest lap	Winning driver	Winning team
1	R1	Thruxton Circuit, Hampshire	10 April	(United Kingdom) Paul Rivett	(United Kingdom) Ed Pead	(United Kingdom) Ed Pead	Mardi Gras Motorsport
1	R2	Thruxton Circuit, Hampshire	11 April	(United Kingdom) Paul Rivett	(United Kingdom) Ed Pead	(United Kingdom) Paul Rivett	Boulevard Team Racing
2	R3	Brands Hatch Indy, Kent	24 April	(United Kingdom) Jonathan Adam	(United Kingdom) Jonathan Adam	(United Kingdom) Jonathan Adam	Total Control Racing
2	R4	Brands Hatch Indy, Kent	25 April	(United Kingdom) Ed Pead	(United Kingdom) Ed Pead	(United Kingdom) Paul Rivett	Boulevard Team Racing
3	R5	Silverstone	8 May	(United Kingdom) Mike Simpson	(United Kingdom) Ed Pead	(United Kingdom) Ed Pead	Mardi Gras Motorsport
3	R6	Silverstone	9 May	(United Kingdom) Mike Simpson	(United Kingdom) Jonathan Adam	(United Kingdom) Ed Pead	Mardi Gras Motorsport
4	R7	Oulton Park Island, Cheshire	22 May	(United Kingdom) Matt Allison	(United Kingdom) Paul Rivett	(United Kingdom) Jonathan Adam	Total Control Racing
4	R8	Oulton Park Island, Cheshire	23 May	(United Kingdom) Paul Rivett	(United Kingdom) Jonathan Adam	(United Kingdom) Jonathan Adam	Total Control Racing
5	R9	Thruxton Circuit, Hampshire	29 May	(United Kingdom) Jonathan Adam	(United Kingdom) Jonathan Adam	(United Kingdom) Jonathan Adam	Total Control Racing
5	R10	Thruxton Circuit, Hampshire	30 May	(United Kingdom) Ed Pead	(United Kingdom) Ed Pead	(United Kingdom) Ian Curley	SpeedEquipe
6	R11	Croft Circuit, Yorkshire	24 July	(United Kingdom) Jonathan Adam	(United Kingdom) Jonathan Adam	(United Kingdom) Jonathan Adam	Total Control Racing
6	R12	Croft Circuit, Yorkshire	25 July	(United Kingdom) Jonathan Adam	(United Kingdom) Ian Curley	(United Kingdom) Ian Curley	SpeedEquipe
7	R13	Knockhill Racing Circuit, Fife	7 August	(United Kingdom) Paul Rivett	(United Kingdom) Nick Adcock	(United Kingdom) Jim Edwards Jr.	Boulevard Team Racing
7	R14	Knockhill Racing Circuit, Fife	8 August	(United Kingdom) Paul Rivett	(United Kingdom) Mike Simpson	(United Kingdom) Paul Rivett	Boulevard Team Racing
8	R15	Brands Hatch Indy, Kent	21 August	(United Kingdom) Ed Pead	(United Kingdom) Ed Pead	(United Kingdom) Jonathan Adam	Total Control Racing
8	R16	Brands Hatch Indy, Kent	22 August	(United Kingdom) Jonathan Adam	(United Kingdom) Nick Adcock	(United Kingdom) Paul Rivett	Boulevard Team Racing
9	R17	Snetterton Motor Racing Circuit, Norfolk	4 September	(United Kingdom) Jonathan Adam	(United Kingdom) Jonathan Adam	(United Kingdom) Paul Rivett	Boulevard Team Racing
9	R18	Snetterton Motor Racing Circuit, Norfolk	5 September	(United Kingdom) Jonathan Adam	(United Kingdom) Richard Williams	(United Kingdom) Richard Williams	SpeedEquipe
10	R19	Donington Park National	25 September	(United Kingdom) Paul Rivett	(United Kingdom) Ed Pead	(United Kingdom) Paul Rivett	Boulevard Team Racing
10	R20	Donington Park National	26 September	(United Kingdom) Paul Rivett	(United Kingdom) Matt Allison	(United Kingdom) Paul Rivett	Boulevard Team Racing

== Drivers' Championship ==
Pos	Driver	THR		BHI		SIL		OUL		THR		CRO		KNO		BHI		SNE		DON		Pts
1	(United Kingdom) Paul Rivett	3	1	2	1	2	Ret	6	2	5	2	2	14	Ret	1	3	1	1	2	1	1	482
2	(United Kingdom) Ed Pead	1	2	3	2	1	1	5	3	11	15	4	4	8	3	2	Ret	5	5	3	3	435
3	(United Kingdom) Jonathan Adam	2	5	1	17	6	12	1	1	1	Ret	1	DSQ	2	2	1	2	3	3	Ret	17	417
4	(United Kingdom) Richard Williams	10	4	4	4	4	6	12	8	7	4	Ret	10	3	5	5	4	6	1	2	5	356
5	(United Kingdom) Ian Curley	7	3	Ret	3	7	3	4	14	13	1	Ret	1	4	Ret	6	5	2	4	4	9	354
6	(United Kingdom) Nick Adcock	4	10	5	DSQ	Ret	4	3	16	6	6	3	3	6	6	4	3	7	9	8	8	329
7	(United Kingdom) Matt Allison	9	11	11	12	5	8	2	7	2	Ret	Ret	11	9	DNS	7	6	13	6	6	2	277
8	(United Kingdom) Neil Waterworth	13	9	8	6	Ret	11	7	4	14	DNS	8	6	10	9	9	8	4	7	Ret	4	248
9	(United Kingdom) Steven Hunter	5	6	6	7	10	2	8	DSQ	16	DNS	6	8	Ret	14	12	14	10	8	Ret	Ret	210
10	(United Kingdom) Jim Edwards Jr.									9	3	10	2	1	4	8	9	16	11	Ret	6	189
11	(United Kingdom) Mike Simpson	Ret	DNS			3	5			19	16	11	7	5	7	10	7	8	Ret	5	14	185
12	(United Kingdom) Tom Onslow-Cole	Ret	12	10	18	8	16	Ret	9	4	7	12	9	11	Ret	11	10	Ret	DNS	13	7	168
13	(United Kingdom) Vince Martin	8	8	7	9	13	7	10	Ret	15	10	5	5	Ret	DNS			Ret	DNS			148
14	(United Kingdom) Fulvio Mussi	Ret	Ret	12	Ret	Ret	9	15	12	8	9	9	12	15	11	Ret	13	9	13	9	12	148
15	(United Kingdom) Martin Johnson	11	Ret	Ret	5	Ret	13	17	11	20	12	7	Ret	Ret	12	13	11	11	15	12	14	137
16	(United Kingdom) Mark Davies	Ret	7	Ret	13	Ret	DNS	11	6	17	8	Ret	DNS	7	8	DSQ	DNS					100
17	(United Kingdom) Daryl McDonald	6	Ret	16	11	12	Ret	9	5	3	Ret	Ret	DNS									99
18	(United Kingdom) Matt Nicoll-Jones	12	Ret	13	10	9	10	13	Ret	12	5	Ret										88
19	(United Kingdom) Steve Wood	17	13	15	DSQ	Ret	19	16	Ret	21	14	Ret	13	14	Ret	14	12	14	12	15	18	88
20	(United Kingdom) Barry Sime							Ret	13	18	13	Ret	Ret	13	10			12	10	10	10	80
21	(United Kingdom) Rob Cullum	Ret	16	9	8	11	14	19	Ret	10	11											71
22	(United Kingdom) Kevin Lloyd †	16	15	19	15	15	17	18	15	22†	DNS											38
23	(Republic of Ireland) Karl Leonard	14	Ret	14	16			14	10													37
24	(United Kingdom) Jack Anderson															Ret	15	15	14	14	16	31
25	(United Kingdom) Rowland Harcourt	15	14	17	Ret	14	15															30
26	(United Kingdom) Daniel Welch													12	13							17
27	(United Kingdom) Mark Hunt																			7	Ret	16
28	(United Kingdom) Ben Winrow																			11	15	16
29	(United Kingdom) Alex Kapadia																			Ret	11	10
30	(United Kingdom) Rommel Jeffers			18	14			Ret	DNS													10
31	(United Kingdom) Natalie Barratt					16	18															8
	(United Kingdom) Phil Grinsell																			Ret	Ret	
	(United Kingdom) Andy Neate																			Ret	Ret	
	(United Kingdom) Colin Stancombe					DNS	DNS															
Pos	Driver	THR		BHI		SIL		OUL		THR		CRO		KNO		BHI		SNE		DON		Pts

† Kevin Lloyd was fatally injured in an accident during Round 9 at Thruxton.
