= Mike Simpson (racing driver) =

British racing driver (born 1983)

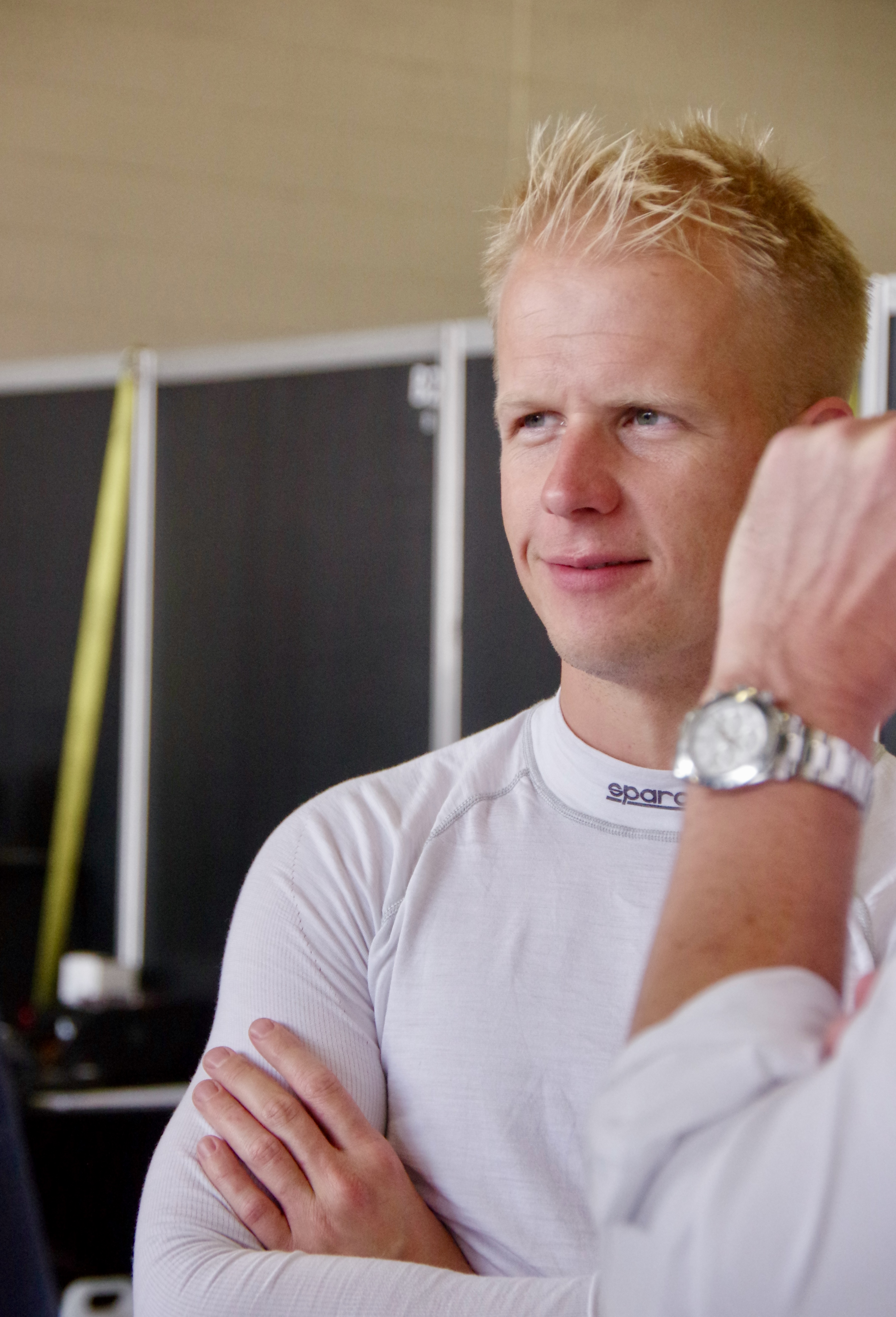
- Simpson in 2019
- Nationality: (United Kingdom) British
- Born: 13 September 1983 (age 43) Beverley, England
- Categorisation: FIA Bronze (2015); FIA Gold (2016–2017, 2020–2025); FIA Silver (2018–2019, 2026–)

Championship titles
- 2023–24, 2025–26 2018 2016: 24H Series Middle East – GTX; 24H Proto Series European Championship – P2; Challenge Endurance PFV V de V

Michael James Simpson (born 13 September 1983) is a British racing driver who last competed in the GT2 European Series for CMR. A staple of Ginetta's racing ventures, he raced in the premier LMP1 class of the FIA World Endurance Championship and now serves as Ginetta Motorsport CEO.

== Career ==
Simpson began karting in 1991, competing until 2011. During his karting career, Simpson won the Super One Series three times in Rotax Max and once in Formula KGP, as well as the 2003 Rok Cup International Final in the Senior class.

In the midst of his karting career, Simpson made his car racing debut in 2004, competing in Renault Clio Cup UK. Following one-off appearances in the Ginetta G50 and GT4 European Cups in 2008 and 2009, Simpson made his full-time return to cars in the 2011 British GT Championship for Stark Racing, as he began a long-term relationship with Ginetta Cars. In his first season in the series, Simpson scored two points finishes, with a best result of ninth at Rockingham as he ended the year 25th in the GT3 standings.

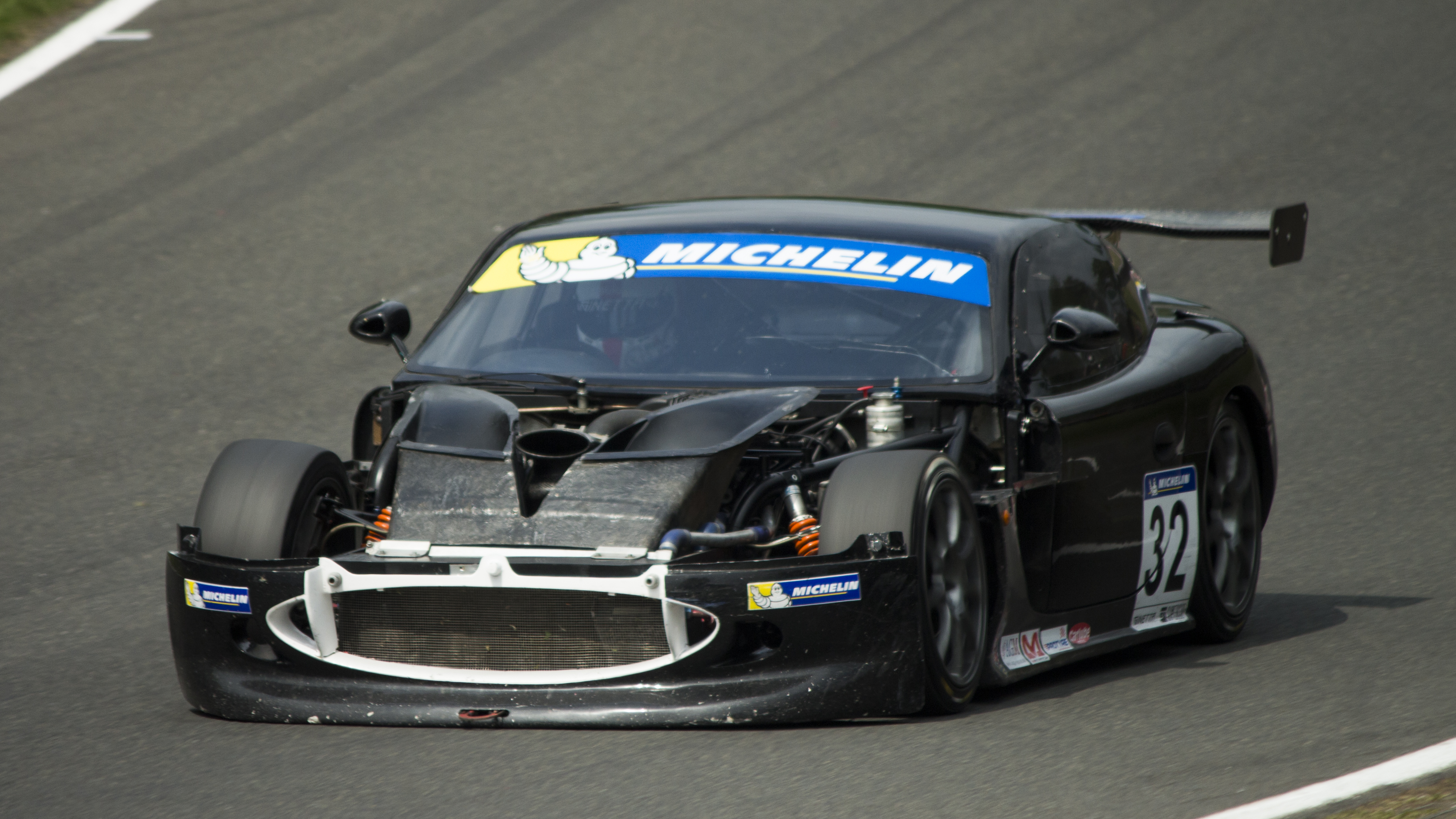
Simpson nursing a damaged Ginetta G50 at Oulton Park in 2013.

Returning to the series for 2012, Simpson competed for Century Motorsport in the GT4 class at Oulton Park, finishing third in race two. Following that, Simpson returned to the GT3 class at Rockingham for Optimum Motorsport, before returning to Team LNT for the final two rounds, in which he scored a best result of fourth at Silverstone. During 2012, Simpson made various one-off appearances for Ginetta-fielding teams in Europe, most notably competing for Nova Race at the 24 Hours of Nürburgring and in the Ginetta G50 Cup Italy. After returning to British GT with Team LNT for 2013, Simpson switched to Challenge Endurance GT/Tourisme V de V for the following year, qualifying on pole four times in the seven race season.

Continuing with Team LNT for 2015, Simpson raced with them in both the LMP3 class of the European Le Mans Series and the GT3 class of the British GT Championship. In the former, Simpson took a lone podium in the season-opening Oulton Park round as he ended the season eighth in the GT3 Pro-Am standings. Competing in all but one round of the latter, Simpson finished second on debut at Silverstone and took his only win of the season at Estoril en route to a fourth-place points finish.

Remaining in British GT for 2016, Simpson raced for Tolman Motorsport in GT3 Pro-Am for the second consecutive season, scoring a best result of sixth in race two at Snetterton. In parallel, Simpson raced in the Challenge Endurance V de V for Team LNT, taking four wins and securing the PFV class title at Estoril. At the end of the year, Simpson joined ARC Bratislava to race in the 2016–17 Asian Le Mans Series in the LMP3 class, taking a lone win at Buriram to end the season third in points.

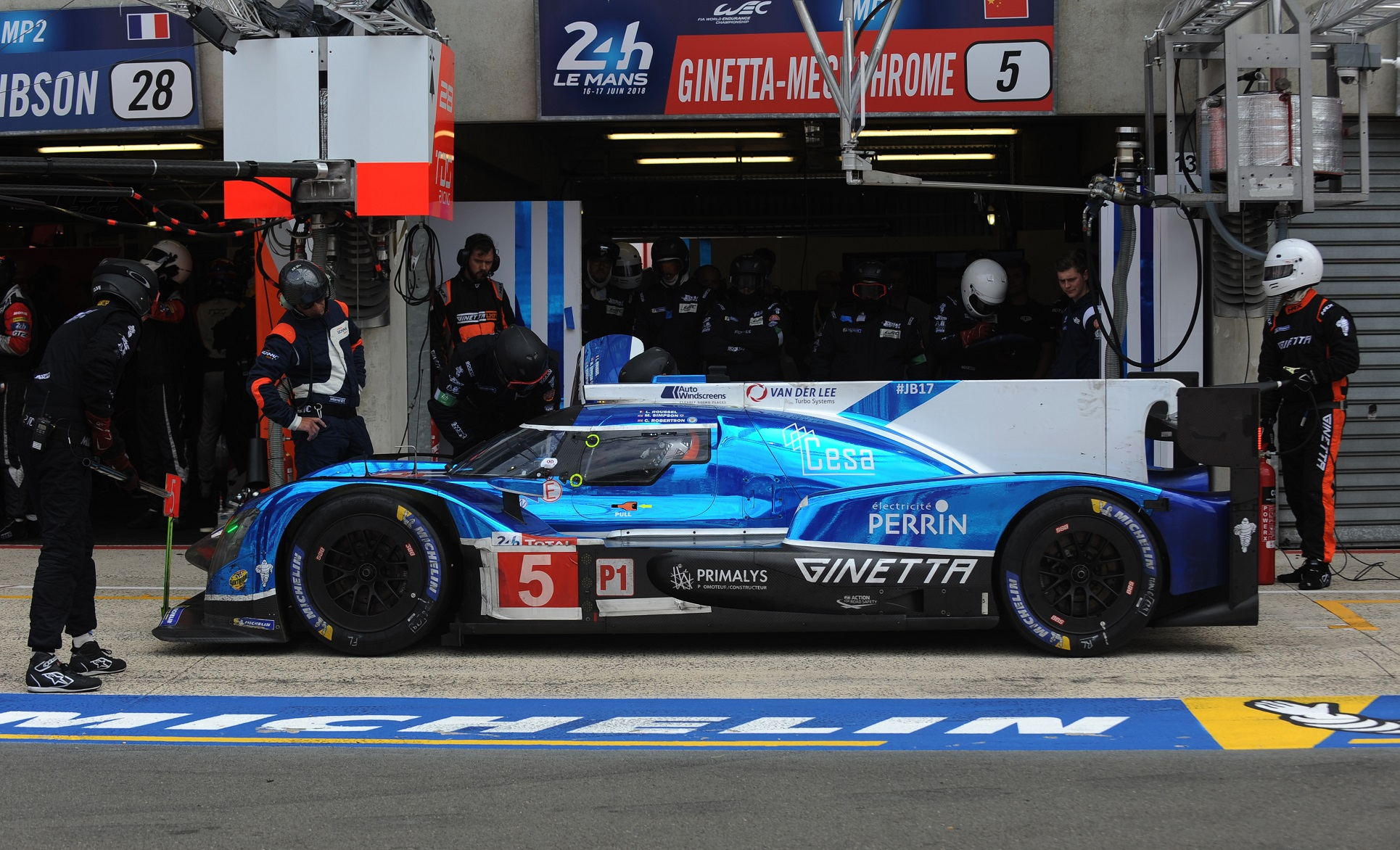
Simpson's No. 5 Ginetta G60-LT-P1 at the 2018 24 Hours of Le Mans.

Simpson remained in the V de V Endurance Series for the rest of 2017, driving for both Simpson Motorsport and Pegasus Racing as he scored two wins to end the year third in the PFV points. In parallel, Simpson drove in select rounds of the British GT Championship for Century Motorsport in the GT4 Pro-Am class, in which he finished on the class podium at Donington Park. The following year, Simpson primarily raced in the 24H Proto Series for Simpson Motorsport, coming runner-up in the Continents series after winning all three races, and winning a truncated European Series at Silverstone. During 2018, he also made his FIA World Endurance Championship debut at the 24 Hours of Le Mans for CEFC TRSM Racing in the LMP1 class. Following a cameo appearance in the LMP3 class of the 2018–19 Asian Le Mans Series for ARC Bratislava, Simpson returned to LMP1 competition by racing in the first four rounds of the 2019–20 FIA World Endurance Championship for Team LNT. After the Ginetta LMP1 programme met its demise in early 2020, Simpson didn't race for the rest of the year, only returning to racing in 2021 with a one-off appearance in the British GT Championship for CWS Engineering in GT4 Pro-Am.

Having been a Ginetta factory driver since 2008, Simpson left the role in 2022 to become the brand's Head of Motorsport. Simpson then made select appearances in the 2022 24H GT Series for CWS Engineering, and the 2023 British GT Championship for Toro Verde GT in GT4 Pro-Am, in which he finished on the class podium three times. In the winter, Simpson drove in the 2023–24 Middle East Trophy for Toro Verde GT, in which he won two of the three races, including a class win at the 2024 Dubai 24 Hour to seal the GTX title. Simpson then joined CMR for 2024, as he raced for them at the 12 Hours of Spa-Francorchamps in GTX and select rounds of the European Endurance Prototype Cup in LMP3. Amid a promotion to Ginetta Motorsport CEO in 2025, Simpson made a number of cameos with CMR, most notably taking an overall podium in race one of the Spa round of the GT4 European Series.

At the start of 2026, Simpson competed in the UAE races of the 2025–26 24H Series Middle East for CMR in GTX, finishing on the podium in both races to secure the class title. For the rest of the year, Simpson remained with the team to race in the GT2 European Series. In his first season in the series, Simpson took class wins at Spa and Zandvoort to secure runner-up honours in Pro-Am.

== Karting record ==
=== Karting career summary ===
Season	Series	Team	Position
1991	Karting World Championship — Junior		6th
1992	Karting World Championship — Formula A		26th
1993	Elf Masters Karting — Karting Stars		9th
1993	Karting World Championship — Formula Super A		7th
2000	Lincolnshire Kart Racing Club — Formula Rotax		1st
2001	Super One Series — Rotax Max		3rd
2002	Super One Series — Rotax Max		2nd
2003	Rok Cup International Final — Senior		1st
2004	Super One Series — Rotax Max		1st
2004	Karting European Championship — ICA	Team Simpson	NC
2006	Super One Series — Rotax Max		1st
2006	Kartmasters British GP — Rotax Senior		3rd
2006	RMC Grand Finals — DD2		2nd
2007	Super One Series — Rotax Max		4th
2007	RMC Euro Trophy — Senior Max	Team Simpson Racing	3rd
2007	Kartmasters British GP — Rotax Senior		1st
2007	Kartmasters British GP — Super Libre		9th
2007	RMC Grand Finals — Senior Max		3rd
2008	Super One Series — KF2		2nd
2008	Karting European Championship — KF2	Birel ART Racing	NC
2008	RMC Euro Trophy — Senior Max	Team Simpson Racing	NC
2008	Kartmasters British GP — KF2		1st
2009	Super One Series — Rotax Max		1st
2009	Kartmasters British GP — Rotax Senior		3rd
2009	RMC Grand Finals — Senior Max		5th
2010	Rotax Wintercup — Senior Max		6th
2010	Kartmasters British GP — Rotax Senior		3rd
2011	Super One Series — Formula Kart GP		1st

== Racing record ==
=== Racing career summary ===
Season	Series	Team	Races	Wins	Poles	F/Laps	Podiums	Points	Position
2004	Renault Clio Cup UK	Tim Sugden Motorsport	15	0	2	1	1	185	11th
2008	Ginetta G50 Cup	Privateer	2	0	0	0	0	36	23rd
2009	GT4 European Cup	Team LNT	2	0	0	0	1	8	18th
2010	Silverstone 24 Hours – Class 4	Ginetta Cars Ltd. / Team LNT	1	1	0	0	1	—N/a	**1st**
2011	British GT Championship – GT3	Stark Racing	8	0	0	0	0	3.5	25th
2011	Silverstone 24 Hours – Class 2	Rollcentre Racing	1	0	0	0	0	—N/a	DNF
2012	British GT Championship – GT4	Century Motorsport	2	0	0	0	1	27	14th
2012	British GT Championship – GT3	Optimum Motorsport	1	0	0	0	1	45	16th
2012	British GT Championship – GT3	Team LNT	2	0	0	0	1	45	16th
2012	Silverstone 24 Hours – Class 1	Team LNT	1	0	0	0	1	—N/a	**3rd**
2012	Ginetta G50 Cup Italy	Nova Race	6	1	0	0	1	95	17th
2012	24 Hours of Nürburgring – SP10	Nova Race	1	0	0	0	0	—N/a	8th
2012	Swedish GT – GTA	Ginetta Cars	1	0	0	0	0	8	28th
2012	Ginetta GT5 Challenge	Ginetta Cars	1	0	0	0	0	0	NC†
2013	British GT Championship – GT3	Team LNT	9	0	0	0	0	0	NC
2013	Ginetta GT Supercup – G50	Privateer	4	2	2	2	4	0	NC†
2013	24 Hours of Nürburgring – SP10	Nova Race	1	0	0	0	1	—N/a	**2nd**
2013	International GT Open – GTS	Team LNT Ginetta	2	0	0	0	0	0	NC
2014	Dubai 24 Hour – A6-Am	Team LNT	1	0	0	0	0	—N/a	9th
2014	Challenge Endurance GT/Tourisme V de V	Team LNT	7	0	4	2	0	36	22nd
2014	British GT Championship – GT3	Team LNT	1	0	0	0	0	0	NC
2015	European Le Mans Series – LMP3	Team LNT	4	1	0	0	2	43	4th
2015	British GT Championship – GT3 Pro-Am	Team LNT	8	0	0	0	1	54	8th
2015	Challenge Endurance GT/Tourisme V de V	Team LNT	3	1	2	2	2	0	NC
2015	Silverstone 24 Hours – Class 1	Team LNT	1	0	0	0	1	—N/a	**2nd**
2015	Group C Racing Championship – Class 1		1	1	0	0	1	31	6th
2016	British GT Championship – GT3 Pro-Am	Tolman Motorsport	9	0	0	0	0	37	12th
2016	Challenge Endurance PFV V de V	Team LNT	6	4	6	3	6	275	**1st**
2016–17	Asian Le Mans Series – LMP3	ARC Bratislava	4	1	0	0	2	61	**3rd**
2017	24H Proto Series – P2	Simpson Motorsport	2	0	0	0	2		
2017	24H Series – SP3-GT4	CWS	1	0	0	0	0	24	NC
2017	Bathurst 12 Hour – C	RA Motorsports - Ginetta	1	0	0	0	0	—N/a	DNF
2017	British GT Championship – GT4 Pro-Am	Century Motorsport	7	0	0	0	1	71	9th
2017	V de V Endurance Series – PFV	Pegasus Racing; Simpson Motorsport	5	2	2	2	2	117.5	**3rd**
2018	24H Proto Series Continents – P2	Simpson Motorsport	3	3	1	0	3	36	**2nd**
2018	24H Proto Series European Championship – P2	Simpson Motorsport	1	1	1	0	1	28	**1st**
2018	Bathurst 12 Hour – C	Ginetta Australia	1	0	0	0	1	—N/a	**2nd**
2018	24H GT Series European Championship – GT4	Endurance Team Romania	1	0	0	0	0	10	NC
2018–19	FIA World Endurance Championship – LMP1	CEFC TRSM Racing	1	0	0	0	0	1	38th
2018–19	Asian Le Mans Series – LMP3	ARC Bratislava	1	0	0	0	0	2	14th
2019–20	FIA World Endurance Championship – LMP1	Team LNT	4	0	0	0	0	12.5	19th
2021	British GT Championship – GT4 Pro-Am	CWS Engineering	1	0	0	0	0	0	NC
2022	24H GT Series – GT4	CWS Engineering	2	0	0	0	1	22	NC
2023	British GT Championship – GT4 Pro-Am	Toro Verde GT	5	0	0	0	3	60	7th
2023–24	Middle East Trophy – GTX	Toro Verde GT	3	2	0	0	2	80	**1st**
2024	24H Series – GTX	CMR	1	0	0	0	0	28	9th
2024	European Endurance Prototype Cup – LMP3	CMR	2	0	0	0	0	1.5	51st
2025	Middle East Trophy – GT4	CMR	1	0	0	0	0	32	NC
2025	GT4 European Series – Silver	CMR	2	0	0	0	1	15	16th
2025	French GT4 Cup – GTA	CMR	2	1	0	0	2	0	NC
2025–26	24H Series Middle East – GTX	CMR	2	0	0	0	2	88	**1st**
2026	GT2 European Series – Pro-Am	CMR	10	2	2	0	4	141	**2nd**
2026	French GT4 Cup – Invitational	CMR							

^{†} As Simpson was a guest driver, he was ineligible for championship points.

=== Complete GT4 European Cup results ===
(key) (Races in bold indicate pole position) (Races in italics indicate fastest lap)

Year	Team	Car	Class	1	2	3	4	5	6	7	8	9	10	11	12	DC	Pts
2009	Team LNT	Ginetta G50	GT4	SIL; 1 DSQ	SIL; 2; 2	ADR; 1	ADR; 2	OSC; 1	OSC; 2	SPA; 1	SPA; 2	ZOL; 1	ZOL; 2	ALG; 1	ALG; 2	18th	8

=== Complete British GT Championship results ===
(key) (Races in bold indicate pole position in class) (Races in italics indicate fastest lap in class)

Year	Entrant	Chassis	Class	1	2	3	4	5	6	7	8	9	10	DC	Pts
2011	Stark Racing	Ginetta G55 GT3	GT3	OUL; 1; 22	OUL; 2; 16	SNE; Ret	BRH; 10	SPA; 1 Ret	SPA; 2 DNS	ROC; 1; 9	ROC; 2 Ret	DON	SIL; 17	25th	3.5
2012	Century Motorsport	Ginetta G50	GT4	OUL; 1; 21	OUL; 2; 22	NUR; 1	NUR; 2							14th	27
2012	Optimum Motorsport	Ginetta G55 GT3	GT3					ROC; 10	BRH	SNE; 1	SNE; 2			16th	28.5
2012	Team LNT	Ginetta G55 GT3	GT3									SIL; 4	DON; 9	16th	28.5
2013	Team LNT	Ginetta G55 GT3	GT3	OUL; 1 Ret	OUL; 2 DNS	ROC; Ret	SIL; Ret	SNE; 1 Ret	SNE; 2; 16	BRH; Ret	ZAN; 1; 13	ZAN; 2; 14	DON; Ret	NC	0
2014	Team LNT	Ginetta G55 GT3	GT3	OUL; 1	OUL; 2	ROC	SIL	SNE; 1	SNE; 2	SPA; 1	SPA; 2	BRH	DON; Ret	NC	0
2015	Team LNT	Ginetta G55 GT3	GT3 Pro-Am	OUL; 1; 7	OUL; 2; 2	ROC; Ret	SIL; 10	SPA; 6	BRH; 21	SNE; 1 Ret	SNE; 2 DNS	DON; 7		8th	54
2016	Tolman Motorsport	Ginetta G55 GT3	GT3 Pro-Am	BRH; Ret	ROC; Ret	OUL; 1; 10	OUL; 2 Ret	SIL; 7	SPA; 10	SNE; 1; 8	SNE; 2; 6	DON; 7		12th	37
2017	Century Motorsport	Ginetta G55 GT4	GT4 Pro-Am	OUL; 1; 18	OUL; 2; 20	ROC	SNE; 1	SNE; 2	SIL; 23	SPA; 1 Ret	SPA; 2 DNS	BRH; 22	DON; 10	9th	71
2021	CWS Engineering	Ginetta G56 GT4	GT4 Pro-Am	BRH	SIL	DON1	SPA	SNE; 1	SNE; 2	OUL; 1	OUL; 2	DON2; 22		NC†	0†
2023	Toro Verde GT	Ginetta G56 GT4	GT4 Pro-Am	OUL; 1	OUL; 2	SIL	DON	SNE; 1; 27	SNE; 2 Ret	ALG; 20	BRH; 18	DON; Ret		7th	60

^{†} As Simpson was a guest driver, he was ineligible for championship points.

=== Complete European Le Mans Series results ===
(key) (Races in bold indicate pole position) (Races in italics indicate fastest lap)

Year	Entrant	Class	Chassis	Engine	1	2	3	4	5	Rank	Points
2015	Team LNT	LMP3	Ginetta-Juno LMP3	Nissan VK50 5.0L V8	SIL; 2	IMO; Ret	RBR	LEC; Ret	EST; 1	4th	43

=== Complete Asian Le Mans Series results ===
(key) (Races in bold indicate pole position) (Races in italics indicate fastest lap)

Year	Team	Class	Car	Engine	1	2	3	4	Pos.	Points
2016-17	ARC Bratislava	LMP3	Ginetta-Juno P3-15	Nissan VK56DE 5.0L V8	ZHU; 4	FUJ; 2	CHA; 1	SEP; 7	3rd	61
2018–19	ARC Bratislava	LMP3	Ginetta-Juno P3-15	Nissan VK50VE 5.0 L V8	SHA	FUJ	CHA	SEP; 9	14th	2

=== Complete FIA World Endurance Championship results ===
(key) (Races in bold indicate pole position; races in italics indicate fastest lap)

Year	Entrant	Class	Chassis	Engine	1	2	3	4	5	6	7	8	Rank	Points
2018–19	CEFC TRSM Racing	LMP1	Ginetta G60-LT-P1	Mecachrome V634P1 3.4 L Turbo V6	SPA	LMS; 5	SIL	FUJ	SHA	SEB	SPA	LMS	38th	1
2019–20	Team LNT	LMP1	Ginetta G60-LT-P1	AER P60C 2.4 L Turbo V6	SIL; 12	FUJ; 9	SHA; 5	BHR; Ret	COA	SPA	LMS	BHR	19th	12.5

=== Complete 24 Hours of Le Mans results ===
Year	Team	Co-Drivers	Car	Class	Laps	Pos.	Class Pos.
2018	(China) CEFC TRSM Racing	(United Kingdom) Charlie Robertson (France) Léo Roussel	Ginetta G60-LT-P1	LMP1	283	41st	5th

=== Complete GT2 European Series results ===
(key) (Races in bold indicate pole position) (Races in italics indicate fastest lap)

Year	Team	Car	Class	1	2	3	4	5	6	7	8	9	10	Pos	Points
2026	CMR	Ginetta G56 GT2	Pro-Am	MNZ; 1; 4	MNZ; 2; 5	**SPA**; **1**; 1	**SPA**; **2**; 4	MIS; 1; 4	MIS; 2; 3	**ZAN**; **1**; 1	ZAN; 2; 3	ALG; 1 Ret	ALG; 2; 5	2nd	141
