= Kay van Berlo =

Dutch racing driver (born 2000)

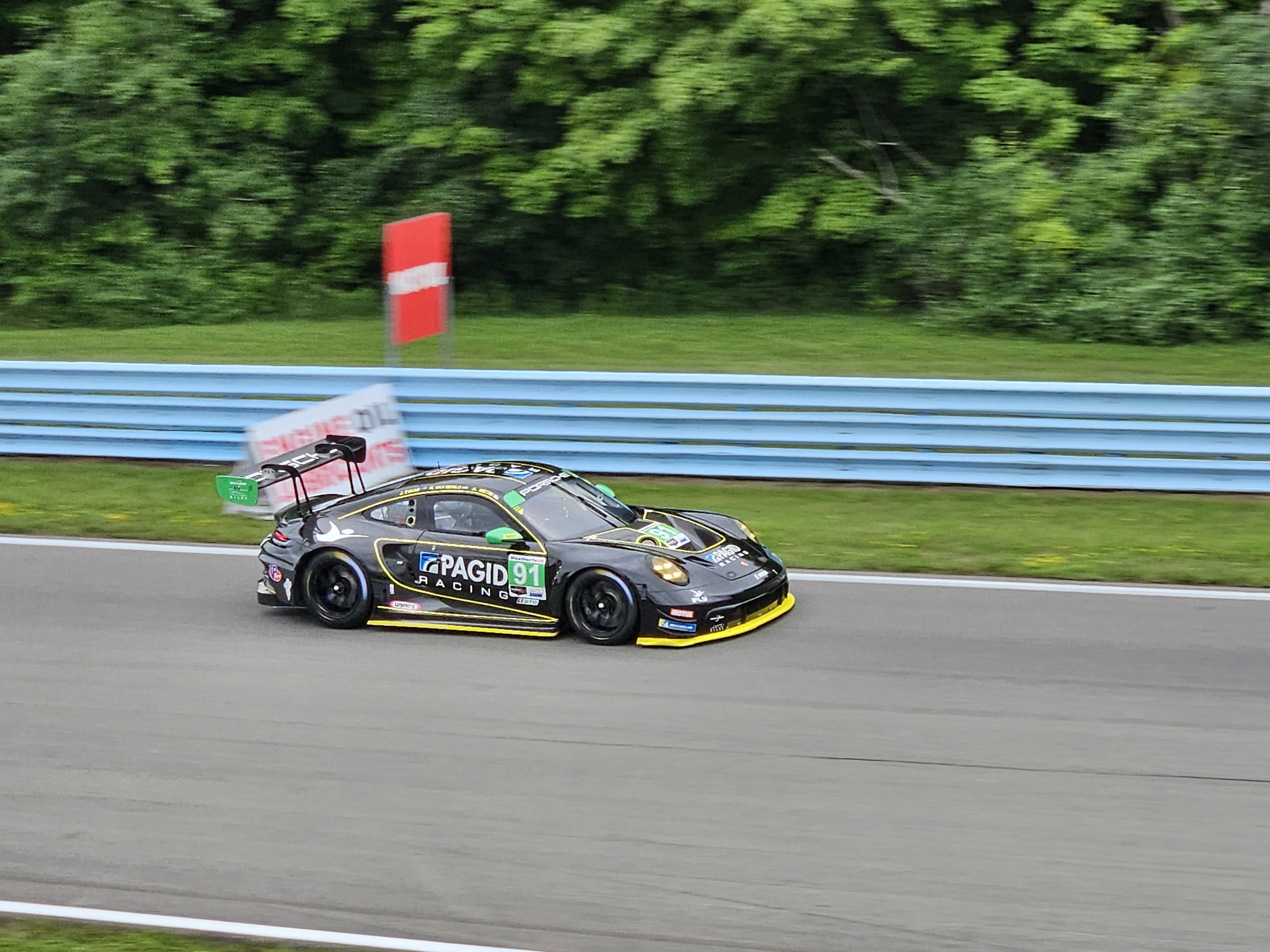
- Van Berlo in 2023
- Nationality: (Netherlands) Dutch
- Born: 21 December 2000 (age 25) Veghel, Netherlands
- Relatives: Glenn van Berlo (brother)
- Categorisation: FIA Bronze (2018); FIA Silver (2019–2023); FIA Gold (2024–)

Championship titles
- 2024 2022: GT4 America Series - Pro-Am; Michelin Endurance Cup - LMP3

Kay Marinus Henricus van Berlo (born 21 December 2000 in Veghel) is a Dutch racing driver. He is a former Porsche North America selected driver, an IMSA Michelin Endurance Cup champion in LMP3 and race-winner in GTD, and most recently won the 2024 GT4 America Series Pro-Am title.

== Prototype career ==
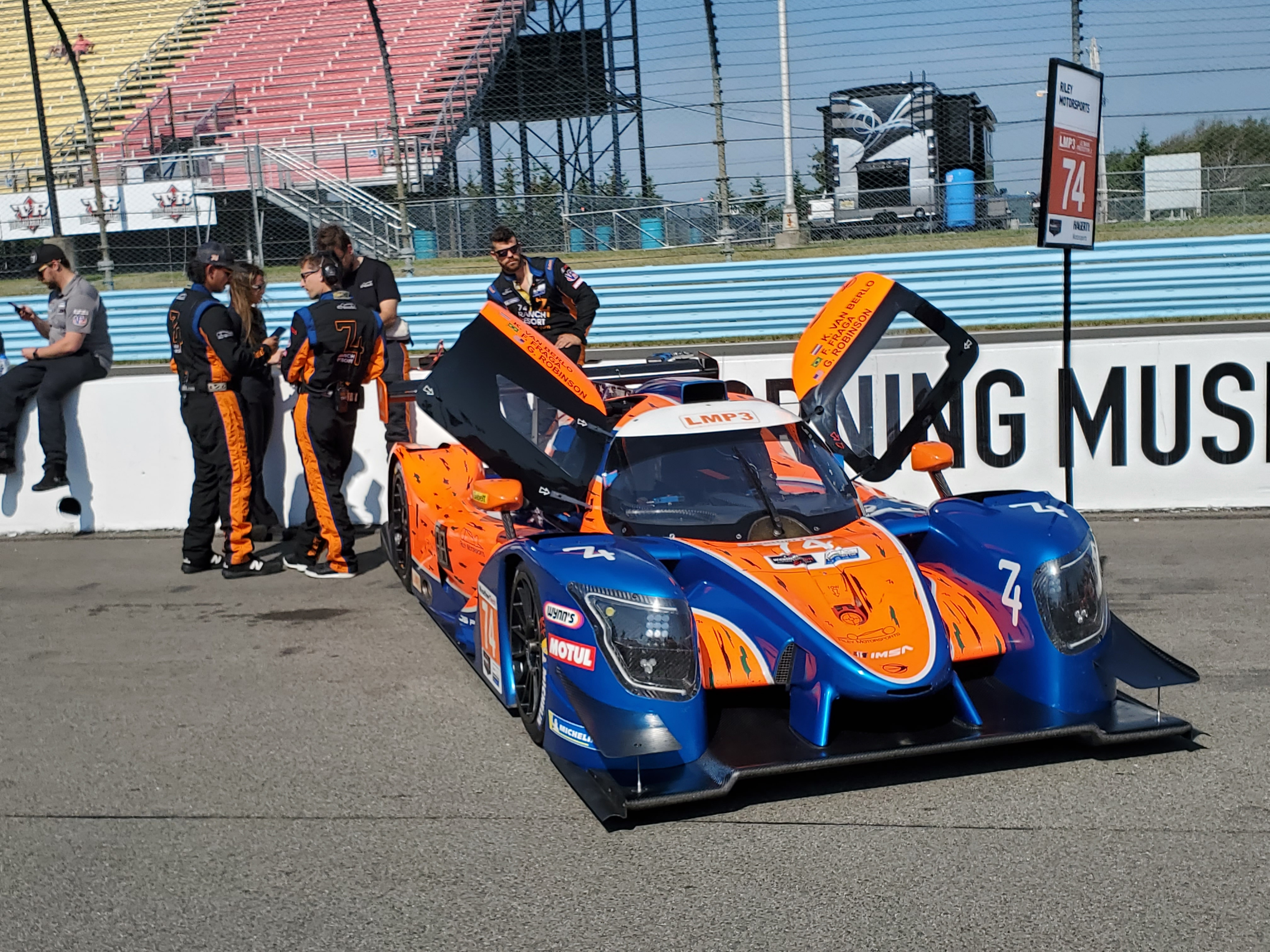
Van Berlo's car at the Watkins Glen round of the 2022 IMSA SportsCar Championship season

In late 2017, it was announced that Van Berlo would make his motorsport debut in the 2018 24H Proto Series for Speedworks Motorsport. He won two races and finished second in the LMP3 standings. A month after his LMP3 debut, Van Berlo joined EuroInternational to compete in the European Le Mans Series. In the season opener at Paul Ricard, Van Berlo scored his first podium in ELMS by finishing third, while in the following race at Monza, he achieved his first ELMS win. Van Berlo also raced in the Road to Le Mans, winning race one and finishing sixth in race two. Towards the end of the year, it was announced that Van Berlo would join United Autosports for the 2018–19 Asian Le Mans Series. Van Berlo won the 2018 4 Hours of Fuji and finished fourth in the LMP3 standings.

Van Berlo returned to the LMP3 class of the European Le Mans Series in 2022, rejoining United Autosports alongside Jim McGuire and Andrew Bentley. He won the 4 Hours of Imola and finished sixth in the standings. In parallel to his ELMS campaign, Van Berlo also raced in the endurance rounds of the IMSA SportsCar Championship with Riley Motorsports. He won at Daytona and Watkins Glen en route to the Michelin Endurance Cup title.

== GT career ==
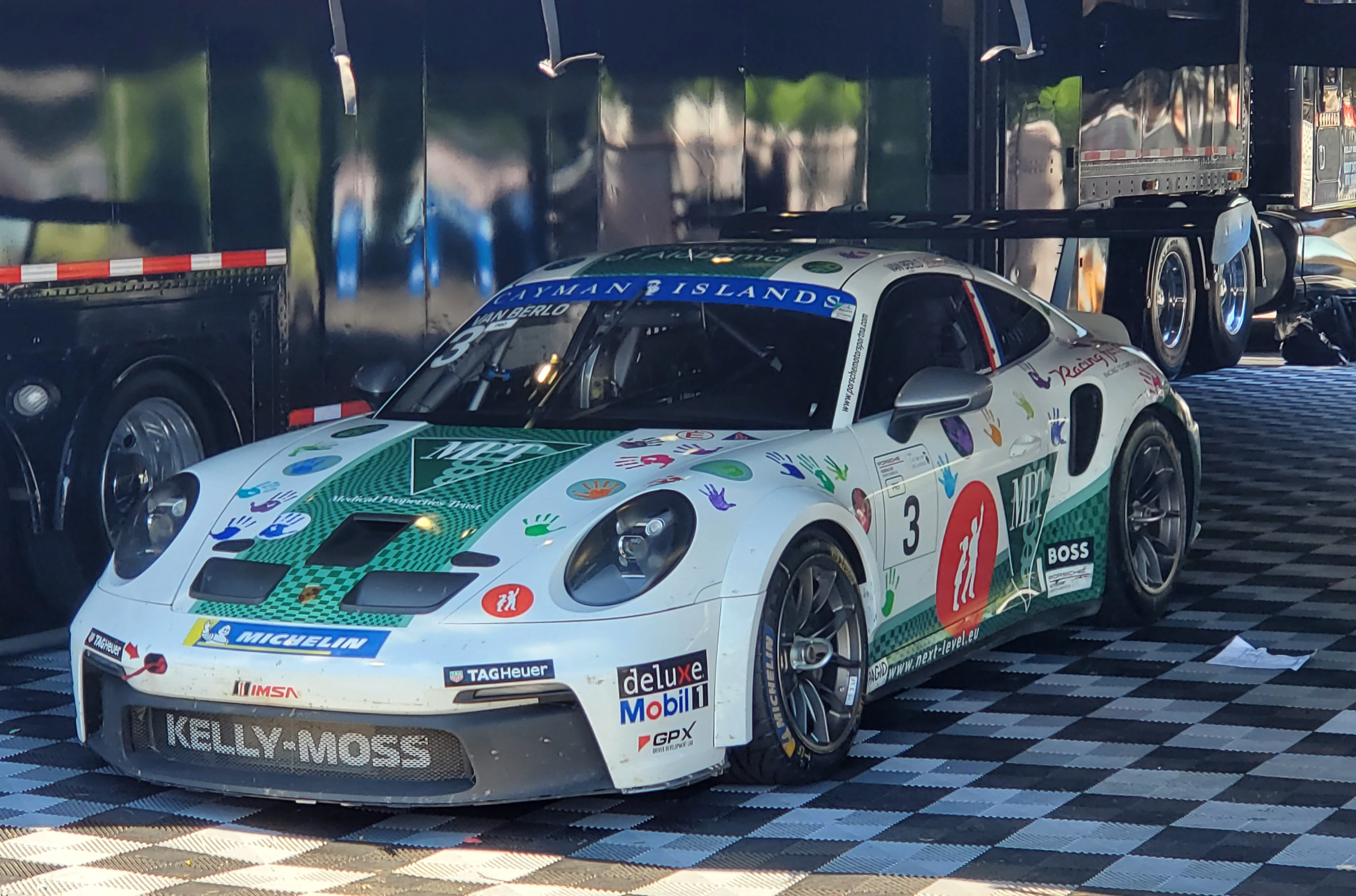
Van Berlo's car at the Watkins Glen round of the 2022 Porsche Carrera Cup North America season

=== Various Porsche Carrera Cup championships (2019–2022) ===
In 2019, Van Berlo competed in the Porsche Carrera Cup Benelux. He scored his first win in Carrera Cup competition at Zandvoort. After spending a season in Porsche Carrera Cup Germany, Van Berlo joined Kelly-Moss Road and Race to compete in the inaugural season of the Porsche Carrera Cup North America. He scored his first of seven wins of the season at Sebring and finished runner-up in the standings to Sebastian Priaulx. Staying in Porsche Carrera Cup North America for another season, Van Berlo won both races at Sebring and Long Beach to kick off the season. Despite sweeping both races at Watkins Glen, Van Berlo was beaten to the title by Parker Thompson.

=== Porsche North America selected driver (2023–2024) ===
At the beginning of 2023, Van Berlo became a Porsche North America selected driver. Staying in the IMSA SportsCar Championship, Van Berlo joined Kelly-Moss with Riley for his first full season in the GTD category. His first GTD win came at Laguna Seca, but the full-season plans were derailed when teammate Alan Metni suffered a non-racing related injury and the car was withdrawn from that year's Petit Le Mans. Alongside his IMSA commitments, Van Berlo joined the GT4 America Series, partnering Curt Swearingin at ACI Motorsports. The pair scored four class podiums and finished sixth in the Pro-Am standings.

Ahead of the 2024 season, Van Berlo was retained as a Porsche North America Selected driver. In early 2024, it was announced that Van Berlo would return to GT4 America Series for ACI Motorsports. He won races at Sebring, VIR and Road America en route to winning the Pro-Am championship with a race to spare. At the end of the year, Van Berlo competed in the IMSA Battle on the Bricks for Kellymoss with Riley. He finished eighth on his GTD return.

=== Sporadic one off-appearances in Porsche machinery (2025–present) ===
At the start of 2025, Van Berlo competed in the 24 Hours of Dubai for Herberth Motorsport and won in the GT3 Pro-Am class. During 2025, Van Berlo made one-off appearances in the GT4 America Series and the 24H Series, most notably winning the 12 Hours of Misano in the 992 class in the latter. The following year, Van Berlo made a one-off return to the 24H Series for his family team, whilst also returning to Kellymoss to compete in the Indianapolis 8 Hour.

== Personal life ==
In addition to his racing career, Van Berlo works as an investment banking analyst at J.P. Morgan.

== Karting record ==
=== Karting career summary ===
Season	Series	Team	Position
2011	Chrono Dutch RMC - Micro Max		7th
2012	Rotax Winter Serie - Mini Max		25th
2012	Chrono Rotax Winter Cup - Minimax		17th
2012	Chrono Dutch RMC - Mini Max		12th
2013	Chrono Karting Winter Serie - Minimax		2nd
2015	BNL Karting Series - Junior Max		7th
2015	Rotax Euro Challenge - Junior Max	Hugo Motorsports	39th
2016	BNL International Karting Series - Seniors		7th
2016	Rotax Euro Challenge - Senior Max	Hugo Motorsports (1); RR Racing (2); M.J.M Van Berlo (3)	4th
2016	RMC Grand Finals - Senior Max	Hugo Motorsports	29th
2017	South Garda Winter Cup — KZ2	Keijzer Racing	87th
2017	FIA European Championship — KZ2	Keijzer Racing	52nd

== Racing record ==
=== Racing career summary ===
Season	Series	Team	Races	Wins	Poles	F/Laps	Podiums	Points	Position
2018	Dutch Winter Endurance Championship - Div. 1	Van Berlo Racing	2	0	0	0	0	0	11th
2018	24H GT Series - 991	Van Berlo Racing	2	0	0	1	1	21	13th
2018	24H Proto Series - P3	Speedworks Motorsport	3	2	0	1	3	47	**2nd**
2018	European Le Mans Series - LMP3	EuroInternational	6	1	0	0	2	46.75	6th
2018	Le Mans Cup - LMP3	EuroInternational	2	1	0	0	1	20	15th
2018	IMSA Michelin Encore – LMP3	K2R Motorsports	1	0	0	0	1	—N/a	**2nd**
2018–19	Asian Le Mans Series - LMP3	United Autosports	4	1	0	0	1	53	4th
2019	Porsche Carrera Cup Benelux	Bas Koeten Racing	8	1	0	1	4	0	17th
2019	24 Hours of Nürburgring - SP10	Prosport-Performance GmbH	1	0	0	0	0	N/A	DNF
2019	VLN Series - V6	Prosport-Performance GmbH	1	0	0	0	0	0	NC
2019	VLN Series - VT3	Prosport-Performance GmbH	1	0	0	0	0	0	NC
2019	GT4 European Series - Pro-Am	Selleslagh Racing Team	2	0	0	0	1	0	NC
2020	Dutch Winter Endurance Series	Van Berlo Racing	2	0	0	1	1	8	15th
2020	Nürburgring Langstrecken-Serie - SP7	rent2drive-FAMILIA-racing	1	0	0	0	0	0	NC
2020	GT4 European Series - Pro-Am	Selleslagh Racing Team	4	0	0	0	1	37	6th
2020	Porsche Carrera Cup Germany	Nebulus Racing by Huber	10	0	0	0	0	59	9th
2021	Porsche Carrera Cup North America	Kelly-Moss Road and Race	16	7	2	4	12	287	**2nd**
2022	IMSA SportsCar Championship - LMP3	Riley Motorsports	4	2	1	0	2	965	15th
2022	Porsche Carrera Cup North America	Kelly-Moss Road and Race	16	6	7	7	10	290	**2nd**
2022	European Le Mans Series - LMP3	United Autosports	6	1	0	1	1	53	6th
2022	Le Mans Cup - LMP3	United Autosports	1	0	0	0	0	1	35th
2023	IMSA SportsCar Championship – GTD	Kelly-Moss with Riley	10	1	0	0	1	2289	13th
2023	GT World Challenge Europe Endurance Cup – Silver	GRT Grasser Racing Team	1	0	0	0	0	0	NC
2023	GT World Challenge Europe Endurance Cup – Bronze	Herberth Motorsport	1	0	0	0	0	20	17th
2023	Porsche Carrera Cup North America	Accelerating Performance	2	0	0	0	0	0	NC
2023	GT4 America Series - Pro-Am	ACI Motorsports	14	0	0	0	4	116	6th
2023–24	Middle East Trophy - 992 Am	Team Captain America by Bas Koeten Racing	1	0	0	0	0	20	NC
2024	GT4 America Series - Pro-Am	ACI Motorsports	13	2	0	1	8	219	**1st**
2024	Michelin Pilot Challenge - GS	Kellymoss with Riley	2	0	0	0	0	170	60th
2024	IMSA SportsCar Championship – GTD	Kellymoss with Riley	1	0	0	0	0	251	55th
2024	Intercontinental GT Challenge	RennSport1	1	0	0	0	0	12	18th
2024	GT World Challenge America - Pro	RennSport1	1	0	0	0	0	24	12th
2025	Middle East Trophy - GT3 Pro-Am	Herberth Motorsport	1	1	0	0	1	0	NC
2025	GT4 America Series - Pro-Am	ACI Motorsports	3	0	1	0	0	3	16th
2025	24H Series - 992	Van Berlo Motorsport by Bas Koeten Racing	1	1	0	0	1	0	NC
2026	24H Series – 992	Van Berlo Motorsport by CP Motorsport	1	0	0	0	1	52	16th
2026	GT World Challenge America – Pro-Am	Kellymoss	1	0	0	0	0	0	NC†
2026	Intercontinental GT Challenge	Kellymoss	1	0	0	0	0	0	NC

=== Complete European Le Mans Series results ===
(key) (Races in bold indicate pole position; results in italics indicate fastest lap)

Year	Entrant	Class	Chassis	Engine	1	2	3	4	5	6	Rank	Points
2018	EuroInternational	LMP3	Ligier JS P3	Nissan VK50VE 5.0 L V8	LEC; 3	MNZ; 1	RBR; 7	SIL; 16	SPA; 13	ALG; Ret	7th	46.75
2022	United Autosports	LMP3	Ligier JS P320	Nissan VK56DE 5.6 L V8	LEC; 7	IMO; 1	MNZ; Ret	CAT; Ret	SPA; 5	ALG; 4	6th	53

=== Complete Le Mans Cup results ===
(key) (Races in bold indicate pole position; results in italics indicate fastest lap)

Year	Entrant	Class	Chassis	1	2	3	4	5	6	7	Rank	Points
2018	Eurointernational	LMP3	Ligier JS P3	LEC	MNZ	**LMS**; **1**; 1	LMS; 2; 6	RBR	SPA	ALG	15th	20
2022	United Autosports	LMP3	Ligier JS P320	LEC; 10	IMO	LMS; 1	LMS; 2	MNZ	SPA	ALG	35th	1

=== Complete Asian Le Mans Series results ===
(key) (Races in bold indicate pole position) (Races in italics indicate fastest lap)

Year	Team	Class	Car	Engine	1	2	3	4	Pos.	Points
2018–19	United Autosports	LMP3	Ligier JS P3	Nissan VK50VE 5.0 L V8	SHA; 6	FUJ; 1	CHA; 5	SEP; 5	4th	53

=== Complete GT4 European Series results ===
(key) (Races in bold indicate pole position) (Races in italics indicate fastest lap)

Year	Team	Car	Class	1	2	3	4	5	6	7	8	9	10	11	12	Pos	Points
2019	Selleslagh Racing Team	Mercedes-AMG GT4	Pro-Am	IMO; 1	IMO; 2	BRH; 1	BRH; 2	LEC; 1	LEC; 2	MIS; 1	MIS; 2	ZAN; 1 DSQ	ZAN; 2; 9	NÜR; 1	NÜR; 2	NC	0
2020	Selleslagh Racing Team	Mercedes-AMG GT4	Pro-Am	IMO; 1; 16	IMO; 2; 10	MIS; 1; 9	MIS; 2 Ret	NÜR; 1	NÜR; 2	ZAN; 1	ZAN; 2	SPA; 1	SPA; 2	LEC; 1	LEC; 2	6th	37

=== Complete IMSA SportsCar Championship results ===
(key) (Races in bold indicate pole position; results in italics indicate fastest lap)

Year	Team	Class	Make	Engine	1	2	3	4	5	6	7	8	9	10	11	Pos.	Points
2022	Riley Motorsports	LMP3	Ligier JS P320	Nissan VK56DE 5.6 L V8	DAY; 1	SEB; 7	MDO	WGL; 1	MOS	ELK	**ATL**; 4					15th	965
2023	Kelly-Moss with Riley	GTD	Porsche 911 GT3 R (992)	Porsche M97/80 4.2 L Flat-6	DAY; 16	SEB; 7	LBH; 12	LGA; 1	WGL; 17	MOS; 9	LIM; 14	ELK; 9	VIR; 8	IMS; 11	ATL	11th	1826
2024	Kelly-Moss with Riley	GTD	Porsche 911 GT3 R (992)	Porsche M97/80 4.2 L Flat-6	DAY	SEB	LBH	LGA	WGL	MOS	ELK	VIR	IMS; 8	ATL		55th	251

=== Complete GT World Challenge Europe results ===
==== GT World Challenge Europe Endurance Cup ====
Year	Team	Car	Class	1	2	3	4	5	6	7	Pos.	Points
2023	GRT Grasser Racing Team	Lamborghini Huracán GT3 Evo 2	Silver	MNZ; Ret							NC	0
2023	Herberth Motorsport	Porsche 911 GT3 R (992)	Bronze		LEC	SPA; 6H; 26	SPA; 12H; 19	SPA; 24H; 27	NÜR	CAT	17th	20
