= 2025 Middle East Trophy =

Motor racing competition

The 2025 Middle East Trophy was the third season of the Middle East Trophy, presented by Creventic. The races were contested with GT3-spec cars, GT4-spec cars, sports cars, 24H-Specials, like silhouette cars, TCR Touring Cars, TCX cars and TC cars.

== Calendar ==
The 12 Hours of Kuwait was provisionally included in the calendar as the opening round in December 2024, however it was dropped later, meaning the season started in 2025 with the Dubai 24 Hour.

Round	Event	Circuit	Location	Date	Map of circuit locations
1	Michelin Dubai 24 Hour	(United Arab Emirates) Dubai Autodrome	Dubai, United Arab Emirates	10–12 January 2025	2025 Middle East Trophy is located in United Arab Emirates
2	Michelin 6 Hours of Abu Dhabi	(United Arab Emirates) Yas Marina Circuit	Abu Dhabi, United Arab Emirates	17–19 January 2025	2025 Middle East Trophy is located in United Arab Emirates

== Teams and drivers ==
Team	Car	Engine	No.	Drivers	Class	Rounds
GT3
(United Arab Emirates) Manamauri Energy by Ebimotors	Porsche 911 GT3 R (992)	Porsche M97/80 4.2 L Flat-6	1	(Italy) Fabrizio Broggi	P 1 PA 2	All
(United Arab Emirates) Manamauri Energy by Ebimotors	Porsche 911 GT3 R (992)	Porsche M97/80 4.2 L Flat-6	1	(Italy) Sabino de Castro	P 1 PA 2	All
(United Arab Emirates) Manamauri Energy by Ebimotors	Porsche 911 GT3 R (992)	Porsche M97/80 4.2 L Flat-6	1	(Romania) Sergiu Nicolae	P 1 PA 2	All
(United Arab Emirates) Manamauri Energy by Ebimotors	Porsche 911 GT3 R (992)	Porsche M97/80 4.2 L Flat-6	1	(Switzerland) Patric Niederhauser	P 1 PA 2	1
(United Arab Emirates) Manamauri Energy by Ebimotors	Porsche 911 GT3 R (992)	Porsche M97/80 4.2 L Flat-6	1	(Italy) Cosimo Papi	P 1 PA 2	2
(China) Climax Racing	Mercedes-AMG GT3 Evo	Mercedes-AMG M159 6.2 L V8	2	(China) Lu Wei	P	2
(China) Climax Racing	Mercedes-AMG GT3 Evo	Mercedes-AMG M159 6.2 L V8	2	(China) Zhang Yaqi	P	2
(China) Climax Racing	Mercedes-AMG GT3 Evo	Mercedes-AMG M159 6.2 L V8	2	(China) Mike Zhou	P	2
(Germany) Haupt Racing Team	Mercedes-AMG GT3 Evo	Mercedes-AMG M159 6.2 L V8	4	(Saudi Arabia) Reema Juffali	Am 1 PA 2	All
(Germany) Haupt Racing Team	Mercedes-AMG GT3 Evo	Mercedes-AMG M159 6.2 L V8	4	(Germany) Salman Owega	Am 1 PA 2	All
(Germany) Haupt Racing Team	Mercedes-AMG GT3 Evo	Mercedes-AMG M159 6.2 L V8	4	(France) Romain Andriolo	Am 1 PA 2	1
(Germany) Haupt Racing Team	Mercedes-AMG GT3 Evo	Mercedes-AMG M159 6.2 L V8	4	(Germany) Hubert Haupt	Am 1 PA 2	1
(Germany) Haupt Racing Team	Mercedes-AMG GT3 Evo	Mercedes-AMG M159 6.2 L V8	4	(Germany) Finn Wiebelhaus	Am 1 PA 2	2
(Germany) SMP Racing (Note: SMP Racing is a Russian team, but they compete under a German flag as Russian national emblems were banned by the FIA following the Russian invasion of Ukraine.)	Mercedes-AMG GT3 Evo	Mercedes-AMG M159 6.2 L V8	7	Vitaly Petrov (Note: All 25 drivers are Russian, but they compete as neutral competitors as Russian national emblems were banned by the FIA following the Russian invasion of Ukraine.)	P	All
(Germany) SMP Racing	Mercedes-AMG GT3 Evo	Mercedes-AMG M159 6.2 L V8	7	Dennis Remenyako	P	All
(Germany) SMP Racing	Mercedes-AMG GT3 Evo	Mercedes-AMG M159 6.2 L V8	7	Sergey Sirotkin	P	All
(Germany) SMP Racing	Mercedes-AMG GT3 Evo	Mercedes-AMG M159 6.2 L V8	7	Alexander Smolyar	P	All
(Germany) SMP Racing	Mercedes-AMG GT3 Evo	Mercedes-AMG M159 6.2 L V8	7	(Kyrgyzstan) Kirill Smal (Note: All following drivers are Russian, but Bukhantsov competes under an Kittitan licence, Ekelchik and Mavlanov under an Armenian license, Geshev under a Montenegrin license, Kireev under a Cypriot license and Minsky, Smal and Solukovtsev under a Kyrgyz license as Russian national emblems were banned by the FIA following the Russian invasion of Ukraine.)	P	1
(Germany) Team Motopark	Mercedes-AMG GT3 Evo	Mercedes-AMG M159 6.2 L V8	5	(Hungary) Levente Révész	PA 1 P 2	All
(Germany) Team Motopark	Mercedes-AMG GT3 Evo	Mercedes-AMG M159 6.2 L V8	5	(Mexico) Sebastián Álvarez	PA 1 P 2	1
(Germany) Team Motopark	Mercedes-AMG GT3 Evo	Mercedes-AMG M159 6.2 L V8	5	(France) Frédéric Jousset	PA 1 P 2	1
(Germany) Team Motopark	Mercedes-AMG GT3 Evo	Mercedes-AMG M159 6.2 L V8	5	(Netherlands) Lin Hodenius	PA 1 P 2	1
(Germany) Team Motopark	Mercedes-AMG GT3 Evo	Mercedes-AMG M159 6.2 L V8	5	(Netherlands) Thierry Vermeulen	PA 1 P 2	1
(Germany) Team Motopark	Mercedes-AMG GT3 Evo	Mercedes-AMG M159 6.2 L V8	5	(Netherlands) Yelmer Buurman	PA 1 P 2	2
(Germany) Team Motopark	Mercedes-AMG GT3 Evo	Mercedes-AMG M159 6.2 L V8	5	(Netherlands) Nigel Schoonderwoerd	PA 1 P 2	2
(South Africa) Into Africa Racing by Dragon Racing (Note: Car No. 8 entered as Into Africa Racing by Dragon Racing and car No. 88 entered as Dragon Racing and Car No. 98 entered as Dragon Racing.) (United Arab Emirates) Dragon Racing	Ferrari 296 GT3	Ferrari F163 3.0 L Turbo V6	8	(Zimbabwe) Axcil Jefferies	PA	All
(South Africa) Into Africa Racing by Dragon Racing (United Arab Emirates) Dragon Racing	Ferrari 296 GT3	Ferrari F163 3.0 L Turbo V6	8	(South Africa) Xolile Letlaka	PA	All
(South Africa) Into Africa Racing by Dragon Racing (United Arab Emirates) Dragon Racing	Ferrari 296 GT3	Ferrari F163 3.0 L Turbo V6	8	(United Kingdom) Jason Ambrose	PA	1
(South Africa) Into Africa Racing by Dragon Racing (United Arab Emirates) Dragon Racing	Ferrari 296 GT3	Ferrari F163 3.0 L Turbo V6	8	(Republic of Ireland) Matt Griffin	PA	1
(South Africa) Into Africa Racing by Dragon Racing (United Arab Emirates) Dragon Racing	Ferrari 296 GT3	Ferrari F163 3.0 L Turbo V6	8	(India) Zaamin Jaffer	PA	1
(South Africa) Into Africa Racing by Dragon Racing (United Arab Emirates) Dragon Racing	Ferrari 296 GT3	Ferrari F163 3.0 L Turbo V6	8	(South Africa) Stuart White	PA	2
(South Africa) Into Africa Racing by Dragon Racing (United Arab Emirates) Dragon Racing	Ferrari 296 GT3	Ferrari F163 3.0 L Turbo V6	8	(United States) Blake McDonald	PA	2
(South Africa) Into Africa Racing by Dragon Racing (United Arab Emirates) Dragon Racing	Ferrari 296 GT3	Ferrari F163 3.0 L Turbo V6	88	(United Kingdom) Matt Bell	PA	1
(South Africa) Into Africa Racing by Dragon Racing (United Arab Emirates) Dragon Racing	Ferrari 296 GT3	Ferrari F163 3.0 L Turbo V6	88	(United States) Dustin Blattner	PA	1
(South Africa) Into Africa Racing by Dragon Racing (United Arab Emirates) Dragon Racing	Ferrari 296 GT3	Ferrari F163 3.0 L Turbo V6	88	(United States) Patrick Liddy	PA	1
(South Africa) Into Africa Racing by Dragon Racing (United Arab Emirates) Dragon Racing	Ferrari 296 GT3	Ferrari F163 3.0 L Turbo V6	88	(United States) Blake McDonald	PA	1
(South Africa) Into Africa Racing by Dragon Racing (United Arab Emirates) Dragon Racing	Porsche 911 GT3 R (991.2)	Porsche 4.0 L Flat-6	98	(United Kingdom) Glynn Geddie	P	2
(South Africa) Into Africa Racing by Dragon Racing (United Arab Emirates) Dragon Racing	Porsche 911 GT3 R (991.2)	Porsche 4.0 L Flat-6	98	(United Kingdom) Jim Geddie	P	2
(South Africa) Into Africa Racing by Dragon Racing (United Arab Emirates) Dragon Racing	Porsche 911 GT3 R (991.2)	Porsche 4.0 L Flat-6	98	(United Kingdom) Phil Keen	P	2
(Switzerland) Hofor Racing	Mercedes-AMG GT3	Mercedes-AMG M159 6.2 L V8	11	(Switzerland) Michael Kroll	Am	All
(Switzerland) Hofor Racing	Mercedes-AMG GT3	Mercedes-AMG M159 6.2 L V8	11	(Switzerland) Alexander Prinz	Am	All
(Switzerland) Hofor Racing	Mercedes-AMG GT3	Mercedes-AMG M159 6.2 L V8	11	(Switzerland) Chantal Prinz	Am	All
(Switzerland) Hofor Racing	Mercedes-AMG GT3	Mercedes-AMG M159 6.2 L V8	11	(Germany) Timo Rumpfkeil	Am	1
(Switzerland) Hofor Racing	Mercedes-AMG GT3	Mercedes-AMG M159 6.2 L V8	11	(Germany) Carsten Tilke	Am	1
(Germany) Winward Racing	Mercedes-AMG GT3 Evo	Mercedes-AMG M159 6.2 L V8	16	Viktor Shaytar	PA	All
(Germany) Winward Racing	Mercedes-AMG GT3 Evo	Mercedes-AMG M159 6.2 L V8	16	Sergey Stolyarov	PA	All
(Germany) Winward Racing	Mercedes-AMG GT3 Evo	Mercedes-AMG M159 6.2 L V8	16	(Italy) Gabriele Piana	PA	1
(Germany) Winward Racing	Mercedes-AMG GT3 Evo	Mercedes-AMG M159 6.2 L V8	16	Rinat Salikhov	PA	1
(Germany) Winward Racing	Mercedes-AMG GT3 Evo	Mercedes-AMG M159 6.2 L V8	16	Sergei Borisov	PA	2
(Germany) Winward Racing	Mercedes-AMG GT3 Evo	Mercedes-AMG M159 6.2 L V8	87	Sergei Borisov	PA	2
(Germany) Winward Racing	Mercedes-AMG GT3 Evo	Mercedes-AMG M159 6.2 L V8	87	(Italy) Gabriele Piana	PA	2
(Germany) Winward Racing	Mercedes-AMG GT3 Evo	Mercedes-AMG M159 6.2 L V8	87	Rinat Salikhov	PA	2
(Germany) Winward Racing	Mercedes-AMG GT3 Evo	Mercedes-AMG M159 6.2 L V8	87	Viktor Shaytar	PA	All
(Netherlands) MP Motorsport	Mercedes-AMG GT3 Evo	Mercedes-AMG M159 6.2 L V8	19	(Netherlands) Bert de Heus	PA	1
(Netherlands) MP Motorsport	Mercedes-AMG GT3 Evo	Mercedes-AMG M159 6.2 L V8	19	(Netherlands) Daniël de Jong	PA	1
(Netherlands) MP Motorsport	Mercedes-AMG GT3 Evo	Mercedes-AMG M159 6.2 L V8	19	(Netherlands) Henk de Jong	PA	1
(Netherlands) MP Motorsport	Mercedes-AMG GT3 Evo	Mercedes-AMG M159 6.2 L V8	19	(Netherlands) Jaap van Lagen	PA	1
(Germany) Huber Motorsport	Porsche 911 GT3 R (992)	Porsche M97/80 4.2 L Flat-6	20	(China) Liang Jiatong	Am	1
(Germany) Huber Motorsport	Porsche 911 GT3 R (992)	Porsche M97/80 4.2 L Flat-6	20	(United States) Robert Mau	Am	1
(Germany) Huber Motorsport	Porsche 911 GT3 R (992)	Porsche M97/80 4.2 L Flat-6	20	(United States) Jon Miller	Am	1
(Germany) Huber Motorsport	Porsche 911 GT3 R (992)	Porsche M97/80 4.2 L Flat-6	20	(Germany) Hans Wehrmann	Am	1
(Antigua and Barbuda) HAAS RT	Audi R8 LMS Evo II	Audi DAR 5.2 L V10	21	(Saint Kitts and Nevis) Alexander Bukhantsov	Am 1 P 2	All
(Antigua and Barbuda) HAAS RT	Audi R8 LMS Evo II	Audi DAR 5.2 L V10	21	(Belgium) Peter Guelinckx	Am 1 P 2	1
(Antigua and Barbuda) HAAS RT	Audi R8 LMS Evo II	Audi DAR 5.2 L V10	21	(Belgium) Bert Longin	Am 1 P 2	1
(Antigua and Barbuda) HAAS RT	Audi R8 LMS Evo II	Audi DAR 5.2 L V10	21	(United Kingdom) James Winslow	Am 1 P 2	1
(Antigua and Barbuda) HAAS RT	Audi R8 LMS Evo II	Audi DAR 5.2 L V10	21	(Canada) Ramez Azzam	Am 1 P 2	2
(Antigua and Barbuda) HAAS RT	Audi R8 LMS Evo II	Audi DAR 5.2 L V10	21	(United Arab Emirates) Omar Jackson	Am 1 P 2	2
(Italy) Dinamic GT	Porsche 911 GT3 R (992)	Porsche M97/80 4.2 L Flat-6	24	(Austria) Klaus Bachler	P	1
(Italy) Dinamic GT	Porsche 911 GT3 R (992)	Porsche M97/80 4.2 L Flat-6	24	(Denmark) Anders Fjordbach	P	1
(Italy) Dinamic GT	Porsche 911 GT3 R (992)	Porsche M97/80 4.2 L Flat-6	24	(Netherlands) Loek Hartog	P	1
(Italy) Dinamic GT	Porsche 911 GT3 R (992)	Porsche M97/80 4.2 L Flat-6	24	(Germany) Thomas Kiefer	P	1
(Italy) Dinamic GT	Porsche 911 GT3 R (992)	Porsche M97/80 4.2 L Flat-6	24	(Kyrgyzstan) Stanislav Minsky	P	1
(Ukraine) Dinamic GT by Tsunami RT	Porsche 911 GT3 R (992)	Porsche M97/80 4.2 L Flat-6	79	(Italy) Fabio Babini	PA	2
(Ukraine) Dinamic GT by Tsunami RT	Porsche 911 GT3 R (992)	Porsche M97/80 4.2 L Flat-6	79	(Italy) Giuseppe Ghezzi	PA	2
(Ukraine) Dinamic GT by Tsunami RT	Porsche 911 GT3 R (992)	Porsche M97/80 4.2 L Flat-6	79	(Germany) Johannes Zelger	PA	2
(United States) Heart of Racing by SPS	Mercedes-AMG GT3 Evo	Mercedes-AMG M159 6.2 L V8	27	(United States) Hannah Grisham	Am	1
(United States) Heart of Racing by SPS	Mercedes-AMG GT3 Evo	Mercedes-AMG M159 6.2 L V8	27	(United Kingdom) Ian James	Am	1
(United States) Heart of Racing by SPS	Mercedes-AMG GT3 Evo	Mercedes-AMG M159 6.2 L V8	27	(United States) Gray Newell	Am	1
(United States) Heart of Racing by SPS	Mercedes-AMG GT3 Evo	Mercedes-AMG M159 6.2 L V8	27	(Canada) Zacharie Robichon	Am	1
(Germany) Car Collection Motorsport	Porsche 911 GT3 R (992)	Porsche M97/80 4.2 L Flat-6	30	(Switzerland) Alex Fontana	PA	1
(Germany) Car Collection Motorsport	Porsche 911 GT3 R (992)	Porsche M97/80 4.2 L Flat-6	30	(Slovenia) Matej Knez	PA	1
(Germany) Car Collection Motorsport	Porsche 911 GT3 R (992)	Porsche M97/80 4.2 L Flat-6	30	(Armenia) Roman Mavlanov	PA	1
(Germany) Car Collection Motorsport	Porsche 911 GT3 R (992)	Porsche M97/80 4.2 L Flat-6	30	Victor Plekhanov	PA	1
(Germany) Car Collection Motorsport	Porsche 911 GT3 R (992)	Porsche M97/80 4.2 L Flat-6	30	Damir Saitov	PA	1
(United Kingdom) Team Parker Racing	Bentley Continental GT3	Bentley 4.0 L Turbo V8	31	(United Kingdom) Robert Huff	PA	1
(United Kingdom) Team Parker Racing	Bentley Continental GT3	Bentley 4.0 L Turbo V8	31	(United Kingdom) Max Lynn	PA	1
(United Kingdom) Team Parker Racing	Bentley Continental GT3	Bentley 4.0 L Turbo V8	31	(United Kingdom) Shaun Lynn	PA	1
(United Kingdom) Team Parker Racing	Bentley Continental GT3	Bentley 4.0 L Turbo V8	31	(United Kingdom) Scott Malvern	PA	1
(Belgium) The Bend Team WRT	BMW M4 GT3 Evo	BMW S58B30T0 3.0 L Turbo V8	32	Timur Boguslavskiy	P	2
(Belgium) The Bend Team WRT	BMW M4 GT3 Evo	BMW S58B30T0 3.0 L Turbo V8	32	(Australia) Yasser Shahin	P	2
(Belgium) The Bend Team WRT	BMW M4 GT3 Evo	BMW S58B30T0 3.0 L Turbo V8	32	(Belgium) Charles Weerts	P	2
(Belgium) AlManar Racing by Team WRT	BMW M4 GT3 Evo	BMW S58B30T0 3.0 L Turbo V8	777	(Oman) Al Faisal Al Zubair	P	1
(Belgium) AlManar Racing by Team WRT	BMW M4 GT3 Evo	BMW S58B30T0 3.0 L Turbo V8	777	(United Kingdom) Dan Harper	P	1
(Belgium) AlManar Racing by Team WRT	BMW M4 GT3 Evo	BMW S58B30T0 3.0 L Turbo V8	777	(Germany) Max Hesse	P	1
(Belgium) AlManar Racing by Team WRT	BMW M4 GT3 Evo	BMW S58B30T0 3.0 L Turbo V8	777	(United Kingdom) Darren Leung	P	1
(Belgium) AlManar Racing by Team WRT	BMW M4 GT3 Evo	BMW S58B30T0 3.0 L Turbo V8	777	(United Kingdom) Ben Tuck	P	1
(United Kingdom) Optimum Motorsport	McLaren 720S GT3 Evo	McLaren M840T 4.0 L Turbo V8	33	(United Kingdom) Tom Ikin	P	All
(United Kingdom) Optimum Motorsport	McLaren 720S GT3 Evo	McLaren M840T 4.0 L Turbo V8	33	(United Kingdom) Mikey Porter	P	All
(United Kingdom) Optimum Motorsport	McLaren 720S GT3 Evo	McLaren M840T 4.0 L Turbo V8	33	(Denmark) Benjamin Goethe	P	1
(United Kingdom) Optimum Motorsport	McLaren 720S GT3 Evo	McLaren M840T 4.0 L Turbo V8	33	(United Kingdom) Morgan Tillbrook	P	1
(United Kingdom) Optimum Motorsport	McLaren 720S GT3 Evo	McLaren M840T 4.0 L Turbo V8	33	(United Kingdom) Andrew Gilbert	P	2
(United Kingdom) WeBuyAnyPhone.com Racing by Simpson Motorsport (Note: Car No. 38 entered as WeBuyAnyPhone.com Racing by Simpson Motorsport and car No. 98 entered as Continental Racing with Simpson Motorsport) (United Arab Emirates) Continental Racing with Simpson Motorsport	BMW M4 GT3	BMW S58B30T0 3.0 L Turbo V8	38	(United Kingdom) James Kaye	P	2
(United Kingdom) WeBuyAnyPhone.com Racing by Simpson Motorsport (United Arab Emirates) Continental Racing with Simpson Motorsport	BMW M4 GT3	BMW S58B30T0 3.0 L Turbo V8	38	(Zimbabwe) Ameerh Naran	P	2
(United Kingdom) WeBuyAnyPhone.com Racing by Simpson Motorsport (United Arab Emirates) Continental Racing with Simpson Motorsport	BMW M4 GT3	BMW S58B30T0 3.0 L Turbo V8	38	(United Kingdom) Darren Ridge	P	2
(United Kingdom) WeBuyAnyPhone.com Racing by Simpson Motorsport (United Arab Emirates) Continental Racing with Simpson Motorsport	Audi R8 LMS Evo II	Audi DAR 5.2 L V10	69	David Pogosyan	Am	All
(United Kingdom) WeBuyAnyPhone.com Racing by Simpson Motorsport (United Arab Emirates) Continental Racing with Simpson Motorsport	Audi R8 LMS Evo II	Audi DAR 5.2 L V10	69	(Kyrgyzstan) Andrey Solukovtsev	Am	All
(United Kingdom) WeBuyAnyPhone.com Racing by Simpson Motorsport (United Arab Emirates) Continental Racing with Simpson Motorsport	Audi R8 LMS Evo II	Audi DAR 5.2 L V10	69	(Cyprus) Vasily Vladykin	Am	All
(United Kingdom) WeBuyAnyPhone.com Racing by Simpson Motorsport (United Arab Emirates) Continental Racing with Simpson Motorsport	Audi R8 LMS Evo II	Audi DAR 5.2 L V10	69	(Montenegro) Alim Geshev	Am	1
(United Kingdom) WeBuyAnyPhone.com Racing by Simpson Motorsport (United Arab Emirates) Continental Racing with Simpson Motorsport	Audi R8 LMS Evo II	Audi DAR 5.2 L V10	69	Mikhail Loboda	Am	1
(Belgium) Comtoyou Racing	Aston Martin Vantage AMR GT3 Evo	Aston Martin M177 4.0 L Twin-Turbo V8	40	(United Arab Emirates) Jamie Day	PA	1
(Belgium) Comtoyou Racing	Aston Martin Vantage AMR GT3 Evo	Aston Martin M177 4.0 L Twin-Turbo V8	40	(Belgium) Matisse Lismont	PA	1
(Belgium) Comtoyou Racing	Aston Martin Vantage AMR GT3 Evo	Aston Martin M177 4.0 L Twin-Turbo V8	40	(Belgium) Kobe Pauwels	PA	1
(Belgium) Comtoyou Racing	Aston Martin Vantage AMR GT3 Evo	Aston Martin M177 4.0 L Twin-Turbo V8	40	(Belgium) Tom van Rompuy	PA	1
(Belgium) Comtoyou Racing	Aston Martin Vantage AMR GT3 Evo	Aston Martin M177 4.0 L Twin-Turbo V8	41	(Belgium) Nicolas Baert	P	1
(Belgium) Comtoyou Racing	Aston Martin Vantage AMR GT3 Evo	Aston Martin M177 4.0 L Twin-Turbo V8	41	Viacheslav Gutak	P	1
(Belgium) Comtoyou Racing	Aston Martin Vantage AMR GT3 Evo	Aston Martin M177 4.0 L Twin-Turbo V8	41	(Netherlands) Mex Jansen	P	1
(Belgium) Comtoyou Racing	Aston Martin Vantage AMR GT3 Evo	Aston Martin M177 4.0 L Twin-Turbo V8	41	(Netherlands) Dante Rappange	P	1
(Slovakia) ARC Bratislava	Lamborghini Huracán GT3 Evo	Lamborghini DGF 5.2 L V10	44	(Slovakia) Adam Konôpka	Am	2
(Slovakia) ARC Bratislava	Lamborghini Huracán GT3 Evo	Lamborghini DGF 5.2 L V10	44	(Slovakia) Matej Konopka	Am	2
(Slovakia) ARC Bratislava	Lamborghini Huracán GT3 Evo	Lamborghini DGF 5.2 L V10	44	(Slovakia) Miro Konôpka	Am	2
(Czech Republic) Scuderia Praha	Ferrari 296 GT3	Ferrari F163 3.0 L Turbo V6	56	(Czech Republic) Josef Král	PA	All
(Czech Republic) Scuderia Praha	Ferrari 296 GT3	Ferrari F163 3.0 L Turbo V6	56	(Slovakia) Matúš Výboh	PA	All
(Czech Republic) Scuderia Praha	Ferrari 296 GT3	Ferrari F163 3.0 L Turbo V6	56	(Slovakia) Miroslav Výboh	PA	All
(Czech Republic) Scuderia Praha	Ferrari 296 GT3	Ferrari F163 3.0 L Turbo V6	56	(Czech Republic) Dennis Waszek	PA	All
(United Kingdom) Garage 59	McLaren 720S GT3 Evo	McLaren M840T 4.0 L Turbo V8	58	(United Kingdom) Adam Smalley	P	2
(United Kingdom) Garage 59	McLaren 720S GT3 Evo	McLaren M840T 4.0 L Turbo V8	58	(Monaco) Louis Prette	P	2
(United Kingdom) Garage 59	McLaren 720S GT3 Evo	McLaren M840T 4.0 L Turbo V8	58	(China) Zhou Yiran	P	2
(Germany) Proton Huber Competition	Porsche 911 GT3 R (992)	Porsche M97/80 4.2 L Flat-6	73	(Germany) Jörg Dreisow	Am	2
(Germany) Proton Huber Competition	Porsche 911 GT3 R (992)	Porsche M97/80 4.2 L Flat-6	73	(Germany) Manuel Lauck	Am	2
(Germany) Proton Huber Competition	Porsche 911 GT3 R (992)	Porsche M97/80 4.2 L Flat-6	73	(Luxembourg) Gabriel Rindone	Am	2
(Germany) Proton Huber Competition	Porsche 911 GT3 R (992)	Porsche M97/80 4.2 L Flat-6	969	(Finland) Jukka Honkavuori	PA	1
(Germany) Proton Huber Competition	Porsche 911 GT3 R (992)	Porsche M97/80 4.2 L Flat-6	969	(Finland) Jani Käkelä	PA	1
(Germany) Proton Huber Competition	Porsche 911 GT3 R (992)	Porsche M97/80 4.2 L Flat-6	969	(United Arab Emirates) Bashar Mardini	PA	1
(Germany) Proton Huber Competition	Porsche 911 GT3 R (992)	Porsche M97/80 4.2 L Flat-6	969	(Dominican Republic) Joel Monegro	PA	1
(Germany) Proton Huber Competition	Porsche 911 GT3 R (992)	Porsche M97/80 4.2 L Flat-6	969	(Finland) Kalle Rovanperä	PA	1
(New Zealand) Earl Bamber Motorsport	Aston Martin Vantage AMR GT3 Evo	Aston Martin M177 4.0 L Twin-Turbo V8	77	(Indonesia) Setiawan Santoso	PA	All
(New Zealand) Earl Bamber Motorsport	Aston Martin Vantage AMR GT3 Evo	Aston Martin M177 4.0 L Twin-Turbo V8	77	(Thailand) Tanart Sathienthirakul	PA	All
(New Zealand) Earl Bamber Motorsport	Aston Martin Vantage AMR GT3 Evo	Aston Martin M177 4.0 L Twin-Turbo V8	77	(New Zealand) Earl Bamber	PA	1
(New Zealand) Earl Bamber Motorsport	Aston Martin Vantage AMR GT3 Evo	Aston Martin M177 4.0 L Twin-Turbo V8	77	(Thailand) Munkong Sathienthirakul	PA	1
(New Zealand) Earl Bamber Motorsport	Aston Martin Vantage AMR GT3 Evo	Aston Martin M177 4.0 L Twin-Turbo V8	77	(United Arab Emirates) Jamie Day	PA	2
(Germany) Herberth Motorsport	Porsche 911 GT3 R (992)	Porsche M97/80 4.2 L Flat-6	80	(Hong Kong) Antares Au	Am 1 P 2	All
(Germany) Herberth Motorsport	Porsche 911 GT3 R (992)	Porsche M97/80 4.2 L Flat-6	80	(Hong Kong) Jonathan Hui	Am 1 P 2	1
(Germany) Herberth Motorsport	Porsche 911 GT3 R (992)	Porsche M97/80 4.2 L Flat-6	80	(Macau) Kevin Tse	Am 1 P 2	1
(Germany) Herberth Motorsport	Porsche 911 GT3 R (992)	Porsche M97/80 4.2 L Flat-6	80	(Hong Kong) Frank Yu	Am 1 P 2	1
(Germany) Herberth Motorsport	Porsche 911 GT3 R (992)	Porsche M97/80 4.2 L Flat-6	80	(Netherlands) Loek Hartog	Am 1 P 2	2
(Germany) Herberth Motorsport	Porsche 911 GT3 R (992)	Porsche M97/80 4.2 L Flat-6	80	(Germany) Joel Sturm	Am 1 P 2	2
(Germany) Herberth Motorsport	Porsche 911 GT3 R (992)	Porsche M97/80 4.2 L Flat-6	91	(Germany) Ralf Bohn	PA	1
(Germany) Herberth Motorsport	Porsche 911 GT3 R (992)	Porsche M97/80 4.2 L Flat-6	91	(Netherlands) Kay van Berlo	PA	1
(Germany) Herberth Motorsport	Porsche 911 GT3 R (992)	Porsche M97/80 4.2 L Flat-6	91	(United States) Jake Pedersen	PA	1
(Germany) Herberth Motorsport	Porsche 911 GT3 R (992)	Porsche M97/80 4.2 L Flat-6	91	(Germany) Alfred Renauer	PA	1
(Germany) Herberth Motorsport	Porsche 911 GT3 R (992)	Porsche M97/80 4.2 L Flat-6	91	(Germany) Robert Renauer	PA	1
(Germany) Herberth Motorsport	Porsche 911 GT3 R (992)	Porsche M97/80 4.2 L Flat-6	269	(Germany) Christoph Breuer	Am	1
(Germany) Herberth Motorsport	Porsche 911 GT3 R (992)	Porsche M97/80 4.2 L Flat-6	269	(Germany) Vincent Kolb	Am	1
(Germany) Herberth Motorsport	Porsche 911 GT3 R (992)	Porsche M97/80 4.2 L Flat-6	269	(Germany) Max Moritz	Am	1
(Germany) Herberth Motorsport	Porsche 911 GT3 R (992)	Porsche M97/80 4.2 L Flat-6	269	(Germany) Florian Spengler	Am	1
(United States) Era Motorsport	Ferrari 296 GT3	Ferrari F163 3.0 L Turbo V6	81	(United Kingdom) Jake Hill	PA	All
(United States) Era Motorsport	Ferrari 296 GT3	Ferrari F163 3.0 L Turbo V6	81	(United States) Dwight Merriman	PA	All
(United States) Era Motorsport	Ferrari 296 GT3	Ferrari F163 3.0 L Turbo V6	81	(United Kingdom) Kyle Tilley	PA	All
(United States) Era Motorsport	Ferrari 296 GT3	Ferrari F163 3.0 L Turbo V6	81	(United Kingdom) Oliver Bryant	PA	1
(United States) Era Motorsport	Ferrari 296 GT3	Ferrari F163 3.0 L Turbo V6	81	(United Kingdom) Ryan Dalziel	PA	1
(Austria) Baron Motorsport	Ferrari 488 GT3 Evo 2020	Ferrari F154CB 3.9 L Turbo V8	86	(Italy) Eduardo Bacci	Am	2
(Austria) Baron Motorsport	Ferrari 488 GT3 Evo 2020	Ferrari F154CB 3.9 L Turbo V8	86	(Iran) Masoud Jaberian	Am	2
(Austria) Baron Motorsport	Ferrari 488 GT3 Evo 2020	Ferrari F154CB 3.9 L Turbo V8	86	(Italy) Angelo Nero	Am	2
(Austria) Baron Motorsport	Ferrari 488 GT3 Evo 2020	Ferrari F154CB 3.9 L Turbo V8	86	(Monaco) Philippe Prette	Am	2
(Lithuania) Pure Rxcing	Porsche 911 GT3 R (992)	Porsche M97/80 4.2 L Flat-6	92	(United Kingdom) Harry King	P	1
(Lithuania) Pure Rxcing	Porsche 911 GT3 R (992)	Porsche M97/80 4.2 L Flat-6	92	(Saint Kitts and Nevis) Alex Malykhin (Note: Malykhin is Belarusian, but he competes under a Kittitan licence as Belarusian national emblems were banned by the FIA following the Russian invasion of Ukraine.)	P	1
(Lithuania) Pure Rxcing	Porsche 911 GT3 R (992)	Porsche M97/80 4.2 L Flat-6	92	Alexey Nesov	P	1
(Lithuania) Pure Rxcing	Porsche 911 GT3 R (992)	Porsche M97/80 4.2 L Flat-6	92	(Austria) Thomas Preining	P	1
GWR Australia	Mercedes-AMG GT3 Evo	Mercedes-AMG M159 6.2 L V8	96	(Australia) Brett Hobson	Am	All
GWR Australia	Mercedes-AMG GT3 Evo	Mercedes-AMG M159 6.2 L V8	96	(Australia) Justin Mcmillan	Am	All
GWR Australia	Mercedes-AMG GT3 Evo	Mercedes-AMG M159 6.2 L V8	96	(Australia) Michael Sheargold	Am	All
GWR Australia	Mercedes-AMG GT3 Evo	Mercedes-AMG M159 6.2 L V8	96	(Australia) Garth Walden	Am	1
GWR Australia	Mercedes-AMG GT3 Evo	Mercedes-AMG M159 6.2 L V8	96	(Australia) Glen Wood	Am	1
(Germany) Tresor Attempto Racing	Audi R8 LMS Evo II	Audi DAR 5.2 L V10	99	(Germany) Alex Aka	P	All
(Germany) Tresor Attempto Racing	Audi R8 LMS Evo II	Audi DAR 5.2 L V10	99	(China) Deng Yi	P	All
(Germany) Tresor Attempto Racing	Audi R8 LMS Evo II	Audi DAR 5.2 L V10	99	(Germany) Dennis Marschall	P	1
(Germany) Tresor Attempto Racing	Audi R8 LMS Evo II	Audi DAR 5.2 L V10	99	(Italy) Lorenzo Patrese	P	1
(Germany) Tresor Attempto Racing	Audi R8 LMS Evo II	Audi DAR 5.2 L V10	99	(China) Mike Zhou	P	1
(Germany) Tresor Attempto Racing	Audi R8 LMS Evo II	Audi DAR 5.2 L V10	99	(Belgium) Jef Machiels	P	2
(United Kingdom) Paradine Competition	BMW M4 GT3 Evo	BMW S58B30T0 3.0 L Turbo V8	991	(Oman) Ahmad Al Harthy	Am	1
(United Kingdom) Paradine Competition	BMW M4 GT3 Evo	BMW S58B30T0 3.0 L Turbo V8	991	(United Kingdom) Darren Leung	Am	1
(United Kingdom) Paradine Competition	BMW M4 GT3 Evo	BMW S58B30T0 3.0 L Turbo V8	991	(United Kingdom) Toby Sowery	Am	1
(United Kingdom) Paradine Competition	BMW M4 GT3 Evo	BMW S58B30T0 3.0 L Turbo V8	991	(United Kingdom) Simon Traves	Am	1
GTX
(Australia) 111 Racing	IRC GT	GM LS3 6.2 L V8	111	(Australia) Jake Camilleri	All	
(Australia) 111 Racing	IRC GT	GM LS3 6.2 L V8	111	(Australia) Darren Currie	All	
(Australia) 111 Racing	IRC GT	GM LS3 6.2 L V8	111	(Australia) Mark Griffith	All	
(Australia) 111 Racing	IRC GT	GM LS3 6.2 L V8	111	(Australia) Grant Donaldson	1	
(France) Vortex V8	Vortex 2.0	Chevrolet LS3 6.2 L V8	701	(France) Lionel Amrouche	All	
(France) Vortex V8	Vortex 2.0	Chevrolet LS3 6.2 L V8	701	(France) Philippe Bonnel	All	
(France) Vortex V8	Vortex 2.0	Chevrolet LS3 6.2 L V8	701	(France) Gilles Courtois	All	
(France) Vortex V8	Vortex 2.0	Chevrolet LS3 6.2 L V8	701	(France) Solenn Amrouche	1	
(France) Vortex V8	Vortex 2.0	Chevrolet LS3 6.2 L V8	702	(France) Arnaud Gomez	2	
(France) Vortex V8	Vortex 2.0	Chevrolet LS3 6.2 L V8	702	(France) Olivier Gomez	2	
(Germany) Leipert Motorsport	Lamborghini Huracán Super Trofeo Evo 2	Lamborghini 5.2 L V10	710	(Switzerland) "Takis"	1	
(Germany) Leipert Motorsport	Lamborghini Huracán Super Trofeo Evo 2	Lamborghini 5.2 L V10	710	(New Zealand) Brendon Leitch	1	
(Germany) Leipert Motorsport	Lamborghini Huracán Super Trofeo Evo 2	Lamborghini 5.2 L V10	710	(China) JJ Song	1	
(Germany) Leipert Motorsport	Lamborghini Huracán Super Trofeo Evo 2	Lamborghini 5.2 L V10	710	(United States) Gerhard Watzinger	1	
(Germany) Leipert Motorsport	Lamborghini Huracán Super Trofeo Evo 2	Lamborghini 5.2 L V10	710	(United States) Don Yount	1	
(United Arab Emirates) Saalocin by Kox Racing	KTM X-Bow GT2	Audi 2.5 L I5	748	(Netherlands) Peter Kox	2	
(United Arab Emirates) Saalocin by Kox Racing	KTM X-Bow GT2	Audi 2.5 L I5	748	(Netherlands) Nico Pronk	2	
(United Arab Emirates) Saalocin by Kox Racing	KTM X-Bow GT2	Audi 2.5 L I5	748	(Netherlands) Dennis Retera	2	
(United Kingdom) Scott Sport	Lamborghini Huracán Super Trofeo Evo	Lamborghini 5.2 L V10	750	(Canada) Keith Frieser	2	
(United Kingdom) Scott Sport	Lamborghini Huracán Super Trofeo Evo	Lamborghini 5.2 L V10	750	(Denmark) Mikkel Mac	2	
(United Kingdom) Scott Sport	Lamborghini Huracán Super Trofeo Evo	Lamborghini 5.2 L V10	750	(United Kingdom) Aaron Scott	2	
(France) Team CMR	Ginetta G56 GTX	GM LS3 6.2 L V8	795	(France) Erwin Creed	1	
(France) Team CMR	Ginetta G56 GTX	GM LS3 6.2 L V8	795	(France) Ethan Gialdini	1	
(France) Team CMR	Ginetta G56 GTX	GM LS3 6.2 L V8	795	(Belgium) Rodolphe Gillion	1	
(France) Team CMR	Ginetta G56 GTX	GM LS3 6.2 L V8	795	(France) Hugo Mogica	1	
(France) Team CMR	Ginetta G56 GTX	GM LS3 6.2 L V8	795	(France) Eric Mouez	1	
(France) Graff Racing	Rossa LM GT	Audi DAR 5.2 L V10	797	(Cyprus) Evgeny Kireev	1	
(France) Graff Racing	Rossa LM GT	Audi DAR 5.2 L V10	797	Nikita Mazepin	1	
(France) Graff Racing	Rossa LM GT	Audi DAR 5.2 L V10	797	(United Kingdom) Harrison Newey	1	
(France) Graff Racing	Rossa LM GT	Audi DAR 5.2 L V10	797	Roman Rusinov	1	
992
(France) SebLajoux Racing	Porsche 992 GT3 Cup	Porsche 4.0 L Flat-6	888	(France) Sebastien Lajoux	Am 1 P 2	All
(France) SebLajoux Racing	Porsche 992 GT3 Cup	Porsche 4.0 L Flat-6	888	(France) Stephane Perrin	Am 1 P 2	All
(France) SebLajoux Racing	Porsche 992 GT3 Cup	Porsche 4.0 L Flat-6	888	(France) Mathys Jaubert	Am 1 P 2	1
(France) SebLajoux Racing	Porsche 992 GT3 Cup	Porsche 4.0 L Flat-6	888	(Belgium) Alexandre Leroy	Am 1 P 2	1
(France) SebLajoux Racing	Porsche 992 GT3 Cup	Porsche 4.0 L Flat-6	888	(France) Louis Perrot	Am 1 P 2	1
(France) SebLajoux Racing	Porsche 992 GT3 Cup	Porsche 4.0 L Flat-6	888	(Hong Kong) Liu Kaishun	Am 1 P 2	2
(France) SebLajoux Racing	Porsche 992 GT3 Cup	Porsche 4.0 L Flat-6	992	(Kazakhstan) Alexandr Artemyev	Am	1
(France) SebLajoux Racing	Porsche 992 GT3 Cup	Porsche 4.0 L Flat-6	992	(Netherlands) Paul Meijer	Am	1
(France) SebLajoux Racing	Porsche 992 GT3 Cup	Porsche 4.0 L Flat-6	992	(France) Lauris Nauroy	Am	1
(France) SebLajoux Racing	Porsche 992 GT3 Cup	Porsche 4.0 L Flat-6	992	(France) Louis Perrot	Am	1
(France) SebLajoux Racing	Porsche 992 GT3 Cup	Porsche 4.0 L Flat-6	992	(France) Lucas Sugliano	Am	1
(France) SebLajoux Racing	Porsche 992 GT3 Cup	Porsche 4.0 L Flat-6	992	(China) Qikuan Cao	P	2
(France) SebLajoux Racing	Porsche 992 GT3 Cup	Porsche 4.0 L Flat-6	992	(China) Ling Kang	P	2
(France) SebLajoux Racing	Porsche 992 GT3 Cup	Porsche 4.0 L Flat-6	992	(China) Lu Zhi Wei	P	2
(India) Ajith Kumar Racing by Bas Koeten Racing	Porsche 992 GT3 Cup	Porsche 4.0 L Flat-6	901	(Belgium) Fabian Duffieux	P	1
(India) Ajith Kumar Racing by Bas Koeten Racing	Porsche 992 GT3 Cup	Porsche 4.0 L Flat-6	901	(Belgium) Mathieu Detry	P	1
(India) Ajith Kumar Racing by Bas Koeten Racing	Porsche 992 GT3 Cup	Porsche 4.0 L Flat-6	901	(India) Ajith Kumar	P	1
(India) Ajith Kumar Racing by Bas Koeten Racing	Porsche 992 GT3 Cup	Porsche 4.0 L Flat-6	901	(Australia) Cameron McLeod	P	1
(Netherlands) Red Camel-Jordans.nl	Porsche 992 GT3 Cup	Porsche 4.0 L Flat-6	909	(Netherlands) Ivo Breukers	P	All
(Netherlands) Red Camel-Jordans.nl	Porsche 992 GT3 Cup	Porsche 4.0 L Flat-6	909	(Netherlands) Luc Breukers	P	All
(Netherlands) Red Camel-Jordans.nl	Porsche 992 GT3 Cup	Porsche 4.0 L Flat-6	909	(Netherlands) Rik Breukers	P	All
(Netherlands) Red Camel-Jordans.nl	Porsche 992 GT3 Cup	Porsche 4.0 L Flat-6	909	(Switzerland) Fabian Danz	P	All
(France) TFT Racing	Porsche 992 GT3 Cup	Porsche 4.0 L Flat-6	911	(France) Jordan Boisson	Am	All
(France) TFT Racing	Porsche 992 GT3 Cup	Porsche 4.0 L Flat-6	911	(France) Patrick Charlaix	Am	All
(France) TFT Racing	Porsche 992 GT3 Cup	Porsche 4.0 L Flat-6	911	(Belgium) Benjamin Paque	Am	All
(France) TFT Racing	Porsche 992 GT3 Cup	Porsche 4.0 L Flat-6	911	(France) Jérôme Boullery	Am	1
(Netherlands) Tierra Outdoor Racing by Hans Weijs Motorsport	Porsche 992 GT3 Cup	Porsche 4.0 L Flat-6	912	(Netherlands) Huub van Eijndhoven	P	1
(Netherlands) Tierra Outdoor Racing by Hans Weijs Motorsport	Porsche 992 GT3 Cup	Porsche 4.0 L Flat-6	912	(Netherlands) Lucas van Eijndhoven	P	1
(Netherlands) Tierra Outdoor Racing by Hans Weijs Motorsport	Porsche 992 GT3 Cup	Porsche 4.0 L Flat-6	912	(Netherlands) Jop Rappange	P	1
(Netherlands) Tierra Outdoor Racing by Hans Weijs Motorsport	Porsche 992 GT3 Cup	Porsche 4.0 L Flat-6	912	(Netherlands) Ralph Poppelaars	P	1
(Austria) razoon – more than racing	Porsche 992 GT3 Cup	Porsche 4.0 L Flat-6	914	(Poland) Artur Chwist	P	All
(Austria) razoon – more than racing	Porsche 992 GT3 Cup	Porsche 4.0 L Flat-6	914	(Denmark) Simon Birch	P	All
(Austria) razoon – more than racing	Porsche 992 GT3 Cup	Porsche 4.0 L Flat-6	914	(Austria) Daniel Drexel	P	All
(Austria) razoon – more than racing	Porsche 992 GT3 Cup	Porsche 4.0 L Flat-6	914	(Armenia) Ivan Ekelchik	P	1
(Italy) Fulgenzi Racing	Porsche 992 GT3 Cup	Porsche 4.0 L Flat-6	917	(Italy) Enrico Fulgenzi	P	All
(Italy) Fulgenzi Racing	Porsche 992 GT3 Cup	Porsche 4.0 L Flat-6	917	(United Arab Emirates) Alessandro Giannone	P	All
(Italy) Fulgenzi Racing	Porsche 992 GT3 Cup	Porsche 4.0 L Flat-6	917	(Italy) Andrea Girondi	P	All
(Italy) Fulgenzi Racing	Porsche 992 GT3 Cup	Porsche 4.0 L Flat-6	917	(Netherlands) Sam Jongejan	P	1
(United Arab Emirates) RABDAN by Fulgenzi Racing	Porsche 992 GT3 Cup	Porsche 4.0 L Flat-6	971	(United Arab Emirates) Saif Alameri	Am 1 P 2	All
(United Arab Emirates) RABDAN by Fulgenzi Racing	Porsche 992 GT3 Cup	Porsche 4.0 L Flat-6	971	(United Arab Emirates) Salem Alketbi	Am 1 P 2	All
(United Arab Emirates) RABDAN by Fulgenzi Racing	Porsche 992 GT3 Cup	Porsche 4.0 L Flat-6	971	(United Arab Emirates) Fahad Alzaabi	Am 1 P 2	All
(United Arab Emirates) RABDAN by Fulgenzi Racing	Porsche 992 GT3 Cup	Porsche 4.0 L Flat-6	971	(Austria) Christopher Zöchling	Am 1 P 2	All
(Belgium) Mühlner Motorsport	Porsche 992 GT3 Cup	Porsche 4.0 L Flat-6	918	(Estonia) Martin Rump	Am 1 P 2	All
(Belgium) Mühlner Motorsport	Porsche 992 GT3 Cup	Porsche 4.0 L Flat-6	918	(Germany) Ben Bünnagel	Am 1 P 2	1
(Belgium) Mühlner Motorsport	Porsche 992 GT3 Cup	Porsche 4.0 L Flat-6	918	Alexey Denisov	Am 1 P 2	1
(Belgium) Mühlner Motorsport	Porsche 992 GT3 Cup	Porsche 4.0 L Flat-6	918	(United States) Bryan Sircely	Am 1 P 2	1
(Belgium) Mühlner Motorsport	Porsche 992 GT3 Cup	Porsche 4.0 L Flat-6	918	(Latvia) Valters Zviedris	Am 1 P 2	2
(Germany) HRT Performance	Porsche 992 GT3 Cup	Porsche 4.0 L Flat-6	928	(France) Stéphane Adler	Am 1 P 2	1
(Germany) HRT Performance	Porsche 992 GT3 Cup	Porsche 4.0 L Flat-6	928	(France) Michael Blanchemain	Am 1 P 2	1
(Germany) HRT Performance	Porsche 992 GT3 Cup	Porsche 4.0 L Flat-6	928	(France) Jérôme da Costa	Am 1 P 2	1
(Germany) HRT Performance	Porsche 992 GT3 Cup	Porsche 4.0 L Flat-6	928	(France) Franck Eburderie	Am 1 P 2	1
(Germany) HRT Performance	Porsche 992 GT3 Cup	Porsche 4.0 L Flat-6	928	(France) Franck Lavergne	Am 1 P 2	1
(Germany) HRT Performance	Porsche 992 GT3 Cup	Porsche 4.0 L Flat-6	928	(United States) Gregg Gorski	Am 1 P 2	2
(Germany) HRT Performance	Porsche 992 GT3 Cup	Porsche 4.0 L Flat-6	928	(Belgium) Gilles Thiers	Am 1 P 2	2
(Germany) HRT Performance	Porsche 992 GT3 Cup	Porsche 4.0 L Flat-6	929	(France) Sylvain Caroff	Am	1
(Germany) HRT Performance	Porsche 992 GT3 Cup	Porsche 4.0 L Flat-6	929	(France) Julien Jacquel	Am	1
(Germany) HRT Performance	Porsche 992 GT3 Cup	Porsche 4.0 L Flat-6	929	(France) Jean Michel Marie	Am	1
(Germany) HRT Performance	Porsche 992 GT3 Cup	Porsche 4.0 L Flat-6	929	(Germany) Alex Renner	Am	1
(Germany) HRT Performance	Porsche 992 GT3 Cup	Porsche 4.0 L Flat-6	929	(France) Vincent Roche	Am	1
(Germany) HRT Performance	Porsche 992 GT3 Cup	Porsche 4.0 L Flat-6	929	(Germany) Steve Caroli	Am	2
(Germany) HRT Performance	Porsche 992 GT3 Cup	Porsche 4.0 L Flat-6	930	(Germany) Holger Harmsen	Am	1
(Germany) HRT Performance	Porsche 992 GT3 Cup	Porsche 4.0 L Flat-6	930	(United States) Gregg Gorski	Am	1
(Germany) HRT Performance	Porsche 992 GT3 Cup	Porsche 4.0 L Flat-6	930	(Germany) Marlon Menden	Am	1
(Germany) HRT Performance	Porsche 992 GT3 Cup	Porsche 4.0 L Flat-6	930	(Switzerland) Silvain Pastoris	Am	1
(Germany) HRT Performance	Porsche 992 GT3 Cup	Porsche 4.0 L Flat-6	930	Alexey Denisov	P	2
(Germany) HRT Performance	Porsche 992 GT3 Cup	Porsche 4.0 L Flat-6	930	Sergey Titarenko	P	2
(Germany) HRT Performance	Porsche 992 GT3 Cup	Porsche 4.0 L Flat-6	930	Victor Titarenko	P	2
(Qatar) QMMF by HRT	Porsche 992 GT3 Cup	Porsche 4.0 L Flat-6	974	(Qatar) Ibrahim Al-Abdulghani	Am	All
(Qatar) QMMF by HRT	Porsche 992 GT3 Cup	Porsche 4.0 L Flat-6	974	(Qatar) Abdulla Ali Al-Khelaifi	Am	All
(Qatar) QMMF by HRT	Porsche 992 GT3 Cup	Porsche 4.0 L Flat-6	974	(Qatar) Ghanim Ali Al-Maadheed	Am	All
(Qatar) QMMF by HRT	Porsche 992 GT3 Cup	Porsche 4.0 L Flat-6	974	(Germany) Julian Hanses	Am	All
(France) GP Racing Team	Porsche 992 GT3 Cup	Porsche 4.0 L Flat-6	938	(France) Victor Bernier	P	1
(France) GP Racing Team	Porsche 992 GT3 Cup	Porsche 4.0 L Flat-6	938	(France) Enzo Joulié	P	1
(France) GP Racing Team	Porsche 992 GT3 Cup	Porsche 4.0 L Flat-6	938	(France) Gabriel Pemeant	P	1
(France) GP Racing Team	Porsche 992 GT3 Cup	Porsche 4.0 L Flat-6	938	(France) Loïc Teire	P	1
(United Arab Emirates) Duel Racing by Huber	Porsche 992 GT3 Cup	Porsche 4.0 L Flat-6	950	(United Kingdom) Phil Keen	P	1
(United Arab Emirates) Duel Racing by Huber	Porsche 992 GT3 Cup	Porsche 4.0 L Flat-6	950	(United Arab Emirates) Nabil Moutran	P	1
(United Arab Emirates) Duel Racing by Huber	Porsche 992 GT3 Cup	Porsche 4.0 L Flat-6	950	(United Arab Emirates) Ramzi Moutran	P	1
(United Arab Emirates) Duel Racing by Huber	Porsche 992 GT3 Cup	Porsche 4.0 L Flat-6	950	(United Arab Emirates) Sami Moutran	P	1
(United Arab Emirates) Duel Racing by Huber	Porsche 992 GT3 Cup	Porsche 4.0 L Flat-6	950	(Germany) Theo Oeverhaus	P	1
(Belgium) Speed Lover	Porsche 992 GT3 Cup	Porsche 4.0 L Flat-6	978	(Belgium) Wim Meulders	Am	All
(Belgium) Speed Lover	Porsche 992 GT3 Cup	Porsche 4.0 L Flat-6	978	(Belgium) Gilles Renmans	Am	All
(Belgium) Speed Lover	Porsche 992 GT3 Cup	Porsche 4.0 L Flat-6	978	(Belgium) Rik Renmans	Am	All
(Belgium) Speed Lover	Porsche 992 GT3 Cup	Porsche 4.0 L Flat-6	978	(Belgium) Stienes Longin	Am	1
(Belgium) Speed Lover	Porsche 992 GT3 Cup	Porsche 4.0 L Flat-6	978	(Belgium) John de Wilde	Am	1
(Japan) Seven x Seven Racing	Porsche 992 GT3 Cup	Porsche 4.0 L Flat-6	989	(Japan) "Bankcy"	P	1
(Japan) Seven x Seven Racing	Porsche 992 GT3 Cup	Porsche 4.0 L Flat-6	989	(Japan) Kiyoto Fujinami	P	1
(Japan) Seven x Seven Racing	Porsche 992 GT3 Cup	Porsche 4.0 L Flat-6	989	(Japan) Tsubasa Kondo	P	1
(Japan) Seven x Seven Racing	Porsche 992 GT3 Cup	Porsche 4.0 L Flat-6	989	(Japan) Taichi Watarai	P	1
(Japan) JBR	Porsche 992 GT3 Cup	Porsche 4.0 L Flat-6	990	(Japan) Yasutaka Ando	Am	1
(Japan) JBR	Porsche 992 GT3 Cup	Porsche 4.0 L Flat-6	990	(Japan) Taku Bamba	Am	1
(Japan) JBR	Porsche 992 GT3 Cup	Porsche 4.0 L Flat-6	990	(Japan) Kiwamu Katayama	Am	1
(Japan) JBR	Porsche 992 GT3 Cup	Porsche 4.0 L Flat-6	990	(Japan) Norikazu Shibata	Am	1
(Japan) JBR	Porsche 992 GT3 Cup	Porsche 4.0 L Flat-6	990	(United Kingdom) David Tan	Am	1
(United Kingdom) Toro Verde GT	Porsche 992 GT3 Cup	Porsche 4.0 L Flat-6	995	(United Kingdom) Callum Davies	P	2
(United Kingdom) Toro Verde GT	Porsche 992 GT3 Cup	Porsche 4.0 L Flat-6	995	(United Kingdom) Steve Laidlaw	P	2
(United Kingdom) Toro Verde GT	Porsche 992 GT3 Cup	Porsche 4.0 L Flat-6	995	(United Kingdom) Graeme Mundy	P	2
GT4
(Austria) Razoon - More Than Racing	Porsche 718 Cayman GT4 RS Clubsport	Porsche MDG 4.0 L Flat-6	414	(India) Ajith Kumar	1	
(Austria) Razoon - More Than Racing	Porsche 718 Cayman GT4 RS Clubsport	Porsche MDG 4.0 L Flat-6	414	(Austria) Leo Pichler	1	
(Austria) Razoon - More Than Racing	Porsche 718 Cayman GT4 RS Clubsport	Porsche MDG 4.0 L Flat-6	414	(Austria) Dominik Olbert	1	
(Germany) SRS Team Sorg Rennsport	Porsche 718 Cayman GT4 RS Clubsport	Porsche MDG 4.0 L Flat-6	427	(Switzerland) Gero Bauknecht	1	
(Germany) SRS Team Sorg Rennsport	Porsche 718 Cayman GT4 RS Clubsport	Porsche MDG 4.0 L Flat-6	427	(Sweden) Tommy Gråberg	1	
(Germany) SRS Team Sorg Rennsport	Porsche 718 Cayman GT4 RS Clubsport	Porsche MDG 4.0 L Flat-6	427	(United Kingdom) Harley Haughton	1	
(Germany) SRS Team Sorg Rennsport	Porsche 718 Cayman GT4 RS Clubsport	Porsche MDG 4.0 L Flat-6	427	(United States) Arthur Simondet	1	
(Germany) SRS Team Sorg Rennsport	Porsche 718 Cayman GT4 RS Clubsport	Porsche MDG 4.0 L Flat-6	427	(Ukraine) Oleksiy Kikireshko	2	
(Germany) SRS Team Sorg Rennsport	Porsche 718 Cayman GT4 RS Clubsport	Porsche MDG 4.0 L Flat-6	427	(United States) Arthur Simondet	2	
(Germany) SRS Team Sorg Rennsport	Porsche 718 Cayman GT4 RS Clubsport	Porsche MDG 4.0 L Flat-6	427	(Germany) Jan-Niklas Stieler	2	
(Germany) SRS Team Sorg Rennsport	Porsche 718 Cayman GT4 RS Clubsport	Porsche MDG 4.0 L Flat-6	427	(Germany) Luka Wlömer	2	
(United Kingdom) AGMC Racing by Simpson Motorsport	BMW M4 GT4 Gen II	BMW S58B30T0 3.0 L Twin Turbo I6	438	(Canada) Ramez Azzam	1	
(United Kingdom) AGMC Racing by Simpson Motorsport	BMW M4 GT4 Gen II	BMW S58B30T0 3.0 L Twin Turbo I6	438	(United Kingdom) Tim Docker	1	
(United Kingdom) AGMC Racing by Simpson Motorsport	BMW M4 GT4 Gen II	BMW S58B30T0 3.0 L Twin Turbo I6	438	(United States) Tiger Tari	1	
(United Kingdom) AGMC Racing by Simpson Motorsport	BMW M4 GT4 Gen II	BMW S58B30T0 3.0 L Twin Turbo I6	438	(Ghana) William Tewiah	1	
(United Kingdom) AGMC Racing by Simpson Motorsport	BMW M4 GT4 Gen II	BMW S58B30T0 3.0 L Twin Turbo I6	438	(Romania) Tudor Tudurachi	1	
(United Kingdom) AGMC Racing by Simpson Motorsport	BMW M4 GT4 Gen II	BMW S58B30T0 3.0 L Twin Turbo I6	438	(Japan) Takashi Hata	2	
(United Kingdom) AGMC Racing by Simpson Motorsport	BMW M4 GT4 Gen II	BMW S58B30T0 3.0 L Twin Turbo I6	438	(Japan) Taiyo Ida	2	
(United Kingdom) AGMC Racing by Simpson Motorsport	BMW M4 GT4 Gen II	BMW S58B30T0 3.0 L Twin Turbo I6	438	(Japan) Kenji Suzuki	2	
(Germany) WS Racing	BMW M4 GT4 Gen II	BMW S58B30T0 3.0 L Twin Turbo I6	470	(Netherlands) Jeroen Bleekemolen	All	
(Germany) WS Racing	BMW M4 GT4 Gen II	BMW S58B30T0 3.0 L Twin Turbo I6	470	(United States) Keith Gatehouse	All	
(Germany) WS Racing	BMW M4 GT4 Gen II	BMW S58B30T0 3.0 L Twin Turbo I6	470	(Netherlands) Emely de Heus	1	
(Germany) WS Racing	BMW M4 GT4 Gen II	BMW S58B30T0 3.0 L Twin Turbo I6	470	(United Kingdom) George King	1	
(Germany) WS Racing	BMW M4 GT4 Gen II	BMW S58B30T0 3.0 L Twin Turbo I6	470	(United States) Tim Pappas	1	
(Germany) WS Racing	BMW M4 GT4 Gen II	BMW S58B30T0 3.0 L Twin Turbo I6	470	(Romania) Tudor Tudurachi	2	
(France) Team CMR	Ginetta G56 GT4 Evo	GM LS3 6.2 L V8	495	(France) Nico Prost	1	
(France) Team CMR	Ginetta G56 GT4 Evo	GM LS3 6.2 L V8	495	(United Kingdom) Mike Simpson	1	
(France) Team CMR	Ginetta G56 GT4 Evo	GM LS3 6.2 L V8	495	(United Kingdom) Freddie Tomlinson	1	
(France) Team CMR	Ginetta G56 GT4 Evo	GM LS3 6.2 L V8	495	(United Kingdom) Lawrence Tomlinson	1	
(United Arab Emirates) Continental TTR Racing	Toyota GR Supra GT4 Evo	BMW B58B30 3.0 L Twin-Turbo I6	496	Viktor Agafonov	1	
(United Arab Emirates) Continental TTR Racing	Toyota GR Supra GT4 Evo	BMW B58B30 3.0 L Twin-Turbo I6	496	Marat Gubaydullin	1	
(United Arab Emirates) Continental TTR Racing	Toyota GR Supra GT4 Evo	BMW B58B30 3.0 L Twin-Turbo I6	496	Dimitry Levin	1	
(United Arab Emirates) Continental TTR Racing	Toyota GR Supra GT4 Evo	BMW B58B30 3.0 L Twin-Turbo I6	496	Konstantin Mandrikov	1	
(United Arab Emirates) Continental TTR Racing	Toyota GR Supra GT4 Evo	BMW B58B30 3.0 L Twin-Turbo I6	496	Stanislav Nonikov	2	
(United Arab Emirates) Continental TTR Racing	Toyota GR Supra GT4 Evo	BMW B58B30 3.0 L Twin-Turbo I6	496	Ilya Sidorov	2	
TCX
(Germany) asBest Racing	SEAT León Cup Racer	Volkswagen EA888 2.0 L I4	101	(Switzerland) Thomas Alpiger	1	
(Germany) asBest Racing	SEAT León Cup Racer	Volkswagen EA888 2.0 L I4	101	(United Arab Emirates) Mohammed Al Owais	1	
(Germany) asBest Racing	SEAT León Cup Racer	Volkswagen EA888 2.0 L I4	101	(Germany) Christian Ladurner	1	
(Germany) asBest Racing	SEAT León Cup Racer	Volkswagen EA888 2.0 L I4	101	(Germany) Pia Ohlsson	1	
(Germany) asBest Racing	SEAT León Cup Racer	Volkswagen EA888 2.0 L I4	101	(United Arab Emirates) Nadir Zuhour	1	
(Germany) asBest Racing	Cupra León TCR	Volkswagen EA888 2.0 L I4	102	(India) Akshay Gupta	1	
(Germany) asBest Racing	Cupra León TCR	Volkswagen EA888 2.0 L I4	102	(Germany) Lutz Obermann	1	
(Germany) asBest Racing	Cupra León TCR	Volkswagen EA888 2.0 L I4	102	(Sweden) Henrik Sandell	1	
(Germany) asBest Racing	Cupra León TCR	Volkswagen EA888 2.0 L I4	102	(Japan) Junichi Umemoto	1	
(Germany) asBest Racing	Cupra León TCR	Volkswagen EA888 2.0 L I4	102	(United Arab Emirates) Nadir Zuhour	1	
(Germany) asBest Racing	Cupra León TCR	Volkswagen EA888 2.0 L I4	102	(United Arab Emirates) Ahmed Al Khaja	2	
(Germany) asBest Racing	Cupra León TCR	Volkswagen EA888 2.0 L I4	102	(India) Fahad Khan	2	
(Germany) asBest Racing	Cupra León TCR	Volkswagen EA888 2.0 L I4	102	(United Arab Emirates) Johny Khazzoum	2	
(France) Chazel Technologie Course	Alpine A110 Cup	Alpine Renault TCe M5Pt 1.8 L Turbo I4	110	(France) Michel Abattu	2	
(France) Chazel Technologie Course	Alpine A110 Cup	Alpine Renault TCe M5Pt 1.8 L Turbo I4	110	(France) Felix Crepet	2	
(France) Chazel Technologie Course	Alpine A110 Cup	Alpine Renault TCe M5Pt 1.8 L Turbo I4	110	(France) Guillaume Masset	2	
(France) Chazel Technologie Course	Alpine A110 Cup	Alpine Renault TCe M5Pt 1.8 L Turbo I4	110	(France) Stéphane Lipp	2	
(France) Chazel Technologie Course	Alpine A110 Cup	Alpine Renault TCe M5Pt 1.8 L Turbo I4	193	(France) Frederic de Badant	2	
(France) Chazel Technologie Course	Alpine A110 Cup	Alpine Renault TCe M5Pt 1.8 L Turbo I4	193	(France) Louka Desgranges	2	
(France) Chazel Technologie Course	Alpine A110 Cup	Alpine Renault TCe M5Pt 1.8 L Turbo I4	193	Ivan Ovsienko	2	
(Germany) SRS Team Sorg Rennsport	Porsche 718 Cayman GT4 Clubsport	Porsche 4.0 L Flat-6	127	(France) Thierry Chkondali	1	
(Germany) SRS Team Sorg Rennsport	Porsche 718 Cayman GT4 Clubsport	Porsche 4.0 L Flat-6	127	(Japan) Yasuhiro Misashi	1	
(Germany) SRS Team Sorg Rennsport	Porsche 718 Cayman GT4 Clubsport	Porsche 4.0 L Flat-6	127	(Japan) Yutaka Seki	1	
(Germany) SRS Team Sorg Rennsport	Porsche 718 Cayman GT4 Clubsport	Porsche 4.0 L Flat-6	127	(Mexico) Benito Tagle	1	

GT3 entries
Icon	Class
P	GT3-Pro
PA	GT3-Pro Am
Am	GT3-Am
992 entries
Icon	Class
P	992-Pro
Am	992-Am

== Race results ==
Bold indicates overall winner.

Event	Circuit	GT3-Pro Winners	GT3-Pro Am Winners	GT3-Am Winners	GTX Winners	992-Pro Winners	992-Am Winners	GT4 Winners	TCX Winners	Report
1	(United Arab Emirates) Dubai Autodrome	**(Belgium) No. 777 AlManar Racing by Team WRT**	(Germany) No. 91 Herberth Motorsport	(United Kingdom) No. 991 Paradine Competition	(Germany) No. 710 Leipert Motorsport	(Netherlands) No. 909 Red Camel-Jordans.nl	(Qatar) No. 974 QMMF by HRT	(United Kingdom) No. 438 AGMC Racing by Simpson Motorsport	(Germany) No. 101 asBest Racing	Report
1	(United Arab Emirates) Dubai Autodrome	**(Oman) Al Faisal Al Zubair** **(United Kingdom) Dan Harper** **(Germany) Max Hesse** **(United Kingdom) Darren Leung** **(United Kingdom) Ben Tuck**	(Netherlands) Kay van Berlo (Germany) Ralf Bohn (United States) Jake Pedersen (Germany) Alfred Renauer (Germany) Robert Renauer	(Oman) Ahmad Al Harthy (United Kingdom) Darren Leung (United Kingdom) Toby Sowery (United Kingdom) Simon Traves	(Switzerland) "Takis" (New Zealand) Brendon Leitch (China) JJ Song (United States) Gerhard Watzinger (United States) Don Yount	(Netherlands) Ivo Breukers (Netherlands) Luc Breukers (Netherlands) Rik Breukers (Switzerland) Fabian Danz	(Qatar) Ibrahim Al-Abdulghani (Qatar) Abdulla Ali Al-Khelaifi (Qatar) Ghanim Ali Al-Maadheed (Germany) Julian Hanses	(Canada) Ramez Azzam (United Kingdom) Tim Docker (United States) Tiger Tari (Ghana) William Tewiah (Romania) Tudor Tudurachi	(Switzerland) Thomas Alpiger (United Arab Emirates) Mohammed Al Owais (Germany) Christian Ladurner (Germany) Pia Ohlsson (United Arab Emirates) Nadir Zuhour	Report
2	(United Arab Emirates) Yas Marina Circuit	**(Belgium) No. 32 The Bend Team WRT**	(United States) No. 16 Winward Racing	(Switzerland) No. 11 HOFOR Racing	(United Arab Emirates) No. 748 Saalocin by Kox Racing	(Belgium) No. 918 Mühlner Motorsport	(Qatar) No. 974 QMMF by HRT	(United Kingdom) No. 438 Simpson Motorsport	(Germany) No. 102 asBest Racing	Report
2	(United Arab Emirates) Yas Marina Circuit	**Timur Boguslavskiy** **(Australia) Yasser Shahin** **(Belgium) Charles Weerts**	Viktor Shaytar; Sergey Stolyarov (Italy) Gabriele Piana; Rinat Salikhov; Sergei Borisov	(Switzerland) Michael Kroll (Switzerland) Chantal Prinz (Germany) Alexander Prinz (Germany) Timo Rumpfkeil	(Netherlands) Peter Kox (Netherlands) Nico Pronk (Netherlands) Dennis Retera	(Estonia) Martin Rump (Latvia) Valters Zviedris	(Qatar) Ibrahim Al-Abdulghani (Qatar) Abdulla Ali Al-Khelaifi (Qatar) Ghanim Ali Al-Maadheed (Germany) Julian Hanses	(Japan) Takashi Hata (Japan) Taiyo Ida (Japan) Kenji Suzuki	(United Arab Emirates) Ahmed Al Khaja (India) Fahad Khan (United Arab Emirates) Johny Khazzoum	Report
