= 2018 24H Proto Series =

The 2018 24H Proto Series powered by Hankook was the second season of the 24H Proto Series. Creventic was the organiser and promoter of the series. The races were contested with Le Mans Prototype and Group CN cars, as well as some special prototypes.

== Calendar ==
Round	Event	Circuit	Date	Report
1	3x3H Dubai	Dubai Autodrome, Dubai, United Arab Emirates	5–7 January	Report
2	3x3H Dubai	Dubai Autodrome, Dubai, United Arab Emirates	5–7 January	Report
3	3x3H Dubai	Dubai Autodrome, Dubai, United Arab Emirates	5–7 January	Report
4	12H Silverstone	Silverstone Circuit, Northamptonshire, United Kingdom	9–11 March	Report
5	12H Navarra	Circuito de Navarra, Los Arcos, Spain	20–22 April	Report
6	3x3H Portimão	Algarve International Circuit, Portimão, Portugal	5–7 July	Report
7	3x3H Portimão	Algarve International Circuit, Portimão, Portugal	5–7 July	Report
8	3x3H Portimão	Algarve International Circuit, Portimão, Portugal	5–7 July	Report
9	3x3H COTA	Circuit of the Americas, Austin, United States	15–17 November	Report
10	3x3H COTA	Circuit of the Americas, Austin, United States	15–17 November	Report
11	3x3H COTA	Circuit of the Americas, Austin, United States	15–17 November	Report

Race is part of the Championship of the Continents
Race is part of the European Championship
Race is part of both the Championship of the Continents and the European Championship

== Entry list ==
Team	Car	No.	Drivers	Rounds
P2
(United Kingdom) Simpson Motorsport	Ginetta G57 P2	4	(South Africa) Simon Murray	1–3
(United Kingdom) Simpson Motorsport	Ginetta G57 P2	4	(United Kingdom) Charlie Robertson	1–4
(United Kingdom) Simpson Motorsport	Ginetta G57 P2	4	(United Kingdom) Jordan Sanders	1, 3
(United Kingdom) Simpson Motorsport	Ginetta G57 P2	4	(United Kingdom) Mike Simpson	2, 4
(United Kingdom) Simpson Motorsport	Ginetta G57 P2	4	(United Kingdom) Bob Berridge	4
(United Kingdom) Simpson Motorsport	Ginetta G57 P2	4	(United Kingdom) Steve Tandy	4
(United Kingdom) Simpson Motorsport	Ginetta G57 P2	6	(Australia) John Corbett	1–4
(United Kingdom) Simpson Motorsport	Ginetta G57 P2	6	(Australia) Neale Muston	1–4
(United Kingdom) Simpson Motorsport	Ginetta G57 P2	6	(United Kingdom) Mike Simpson	1–4
(United Kingdom) Simpson Motorsport	Ginetta G57 P2	6	(United Kingdom) Jordan Sanders	1–2
(United Kingdom) Simpson Motorsport	Ginetta G57 P2	6	(Greece) Andreas Laskaratos	4
P3
(United Kingdom) Speedworks Motorsport	Ligier JS P3	22	(Netherlands) Kay van Berlo	1–3
(United Kingdom) Speedworks Motorsport	Ligier JS P3	22	(United Kingdom) Jack Butel	1–3
(United Kingdom) Speedworks Motorsport	Ligier JS P3	22	(Russia) Konstantin Gugkaev	1–3
(France) Graff	Ligier JS P3	44	(Poland) Michał Broniszewski	1–3
(France) Graff	Ligier JS P3	44	(Italy) Giacomo Piccini	1–3
(Switzerland) Spirit of Race	Ligier JS P3	48	(Portugal) Rui Águas	1–3
(Switzerland) Spirit of Race	Ligier JS P3	48	(Italy) Marco Cioci	1–3
(Switzerland) Spirit of Race	Ligier JS P3	48	(Greece) Kriton Lendoudis	1–3
(Switzerland) Spirit of Race	Ligier JS P3	48	(Italy) Piergiuseppe Perazzini	1–3
CN1
(United Kingdom) Tim Gray Motorsport	Norma M20 FC	92	(United Kingdom) Sam Allpass	4
(United Kingdom) Tim Gray Motorsport	Norma M20 FC	92	(United Kingdom) Stefano Leaney	4
(United Kingdom) Tim Gray Motorsport	Norma M20 FC	92	(United Kingdom) Neil Primrose	4
(France) Krafft Racing	Norma M20 FC	97	(France) Régis Tref	1–4
(France) Krafft Racing	Norma M20 FC	97	(France) Max Bortolami	1–3
(France) Krafft Racing	Norma M20 FC	97	(France) David Cristini	1–3
(France) Krafft Racing	Norma M20 FC	97	(France) Karl Pedraza	4
(France) Krafft Racing	Norma M20 FC	97	(France) Norbert Sauvain	4
(France) Krafft Racing	Norma M20 FC	98	(France) Daniel Kirmann	1–3
(France) Krafft Racing	Norma M20 FC	98	(France) François Kirmann	1–3
(France) Krafft Racing	Norma M20 FC	98	(France) Marc Vives	1–3
(United Arab Emirates) AUH Motorsports	Radical SR3 RSX	177	(Kuwait) Mohammed Al Hassawi	1–3
(United Arab Emirates) AUH Motorsports	Radical SR3 RSX	177	(Kuwait) Mohammed Al Nusif	1–3
(United Arab Emirates) AUH Motorsports	Radical SR3 RSX	177	(Kuwait) Salem Al Nusif	1–3

== Race results ==
Bold indicates overall winner.

Classes	(United Arab Emirates) 3x3h Dubai (Rounds 1-3)			(United Kingdom) 12h Silverstone (Round 4)	(Spain) 12h Navarra (Round 5)	(Portugal) 3x3h Portimão (Rounds 6-8)	(United States) 3x3h Austin (Round 9-11)
P2 Winners	**(United Kingdom) No. 6 Simpson Motorsport**	**(United Kingdom) No. 4 Simpson Motorsport**	**(United Kingdom) No. 6 Simpson Motorsport**	**(United Kingdom) No. 6 Simpson Motorsport**	No Entries		
P2 Winners	**(Australia) John Corbett** **(Australia) Neale Muston** **(United Kingdom) Jordan Sanders** **(United Kingdom) Mike Simpson**	**(South Africa) Simon Murray** **(United Kingdom) Charlie Robertson** **(United Kingdom) Mike Simpson**	**(Australia) John Corbett** **(Australia) Neale Muston** **(United Kingdom) Mike Simpson**	**(United Kingdom) Steve Tandy** **(United Kingdom) Bob Berridge** **(United Kingdom) Mike Simpson** **(United Kingdom) Charlie Robertson**	No Entries		
P3 Winners	(France) No. 44 Graff	(United Kingdom) No. 22 Speedworks Motorsport	(United Kingdom) No. 22 Speedworks Motorsport	No entries	No Entries		
P3 Winners	(Poland) Michał Broniszewski (Italy) Giacomo Piccini	(Netherlands) Kay van Berlo (United Kingdom) Jack Butel (Russia) Konstantin Gugkaev	(Netherlands) Kay van Berlo (United Kingdom) Jack Butel (Russia) Konstantin Gugkaev	No entries	No Entries		
CN1 Winners	(France) No. 98 Krafft Racing	(France) No. 97 Krafft Racing	(France) No. 98 Krafft Racing	(France) No. 97 Krafft Racing	No Entries		
CN1 Winners	(France) Daniel Kirmann (France) François Kirmann (France) Marc Vives	(France) Max Bortolami (France) David Cristini (France) Régis Tref	(France) Daniel Kirmann (France) François Kirmann (France) Marc Vives	(France) Karl Pedraza (France) Norbert Sauvain (France) Régis Tref	No Entries		

== See also ==
- 24H Series
- 2018 24H GT Series
- 2018 24H TCE Series
- 2018 Dubai 24 Hour
