= Ian Curley =

British racing driver (born 1972)

Ian Curley (born 1 July 1972) is a British Mini racing driver.

Curley is also known for his brief time in the 2005 British Touring Car Championship season. Previously he raced in the 2004 Renault Clio Cup, having a successful season with two race wins and a final point standing of fifth. He stepped up to the BTCC the next year with a drive in a Lexus IS200 for the HPI Racing with Friends Reunited team. The car was uncompetitive and well off the pace of the front running teams. He only had the funding for selected races through the season and finished down in seventeenth in a field of just eighteen drivers with three points.

== Racing record ==
=== Complete British Touring Car Championship results ===
(key) (Races in bold indicate pole position - 1 point awarded in first race) (Races in italics indicate fastest lap - 1 point awarded all races) (* signifies that driver lead race for at least one lap - 1 point awarded all races)

Year	Team	Car	1	2	3	4	5	6	7	8	9	10	11	12	13	14	15	16	17	18	19	20	21	22	23	24	25	26	27	28	29	30	DC	Pts
2005	HPI Racing	Lexus IS200	DON; 1	DON; 2	DON; 3	THR; 1	THR; 2	THR; 3	BRH; 1 NC	BRH; 2; 9	**BRH**; **3** NC	OUL; 1 DNS	OUL; 2 DNS	OUL; 3 DNS	CRO; 1; 12	CRO; 2; 11	CRO; 3 Ret	MON; 1; 16	MON; 2; 11	MON; 3; 12	SNE; 1; 14	SNE; 2 Ret	SNE; 3; 10	KNO; 1; 12	KNO; 2 Ret	KNO; 3 DNS	SIL; 1; 14	SIL; 2; 11	SIL; 3; 14	BRH; 1; 14	BRH; 2; 12	BRH; 3; 12	**17th**	**3**
