= 2016 4 Hours of Fuji =

The Track map of the Fuji Speedway

The 2016 4 Hours of Fuji was the second round of the 2016-17 Asian Le Mans Series season. It took place on December 4, 2016, at Fuji Speedway in Oyama, Shizuoka, Japan.

== Qualifying ==
=== Qualifying results ===
Pole positions in each class are indicated in bold.

Pos.	Class	No.	Entry	Chassis	Time
1	**LMP2**	**25**	**(Portugal) Algarve Pro Racing**	Ligier JS P2-Nissan	**1:32.646**
2	LMP2	35	(China) Jackie Chan DC Racing	Oreca 03R-Nissan	1:32.916
3	LMP2	24	(Portugal) Algarve Pro Racing	Ligier JS P2-Judd	1:33.089
4	LMP2	8	(Switzerland) Race Performance	Oreca 03R-Judd	1:33.771
5	**LMP3**	**26**	**(United Kingdom) Tockwith Motorsports**	**Ligier JS P3**	**1:36.054**
6	LMP3	67	(Philippines) PRT Racing	Ginetta-Juno LMP3	1:36.115
7	LMP3	1	(China) Jackie Chan DC Racing	Ligier JS P3	1:36.523
8	LMP3	7	(Slovakia) ARC Bratislava	Ginetta-Juno LMP3	1:36.968
9	LMP3	99	(Hong Kong) Wineurasia	Ligier JS P3	1:37.029
10	LMP3	85	(Chinese Taipei) G-Print by Triple 1 Racing	Ligier JS P3	1:37.065
11	**GT**	**37**	**(China) Team BBT**	**Ferrari 488 GT3**	**1:37.083**
12	LMP3	4	(Slovakia) ARC Bratislava	Ginetta-Juno LMP3	1:37.223
13	GT	5	(Hong Kong) DH Racing	Ferrari 488 GT3	1:37.228
14	GT	38	(Switzerland) Spirit of Race	Ferrari 488 GT3	1:37.243
15	GT	91	(Chinese Taipei) FIST-Team AAI	BMW M6 GT3	1:37.573
16	GT	90	(Chinese Taipei) FIST-Team AAI	BMW M6 GT3	1:37.651
17	GT	10	(China) FFF Racing by ACM	Lamborghini Huracán GT3	1:37.657
18	LMP3	69	(Malaysia) Aylezo Ecotint Racing	Ginetta-Juno LMP3	1:37.678
19	GT	3	(Hong Kong) DH Racing	Ferrari 488 GT3	1:37.696
20	GT	6	(Italy) VS Racing	Lamborghini Huracán GT3	1:37.837
21	GT	86	(Malaysia) OD Racing Best Leader Team	Mclaren 650S GT3	1:37.978
22	GT	61	(Singapore) Clearwater Racing	Ferrari 488 GT3	1:38.179
13	GT	31	(South Korea) Team Audi Korea	Audi R8 LMS	1:38.583
24	GT	51	(Hong Kong) KCMG	Audi R8 LMS	1:38.922
25	GT	92	(Chinese Taipei) FIST-Team AAI	Mercedes-AMG GT3	1:39.137
26	LMP3	48	(Finland) PS Racing	ADESS-03	1:40.439
27	**GTC**	**96**	**(Japan) TKS**	**Porsche 911 GT3 Cup**	**1:43.947**

== Race ==
=== Race results ===
Class winners are in bold.

Pos.	Class	No.	Entry	Drivers	Chassis	Laps
Pos.	Class	No.	Entry	Drivers	Engine	Laps
1	**LMP2**	**8**	**(Switzerland) Race Performance**	**(Switzerland) Giorgio Maggi** **(United Kingdom) Struan Moore** **(Germany) Fabian Schiller**	**Oreca 03R**	**138**
1	**LMP2**	**8**	**(Switzerland) Race Performance**	**(Switzerland) Giorgio Maggi** **(United Kingdom) Struan Moore** **(Germany) Fabian Schiller**	**Judd HK 3.6 L V8**	**138**
2	LMP2	35	(China) Jackie Chan DC Racing	(China) Ho-Pin Tung (United States) Gustavo Menezes (France) Thomas Laurent	Oreca 03R	137
2	LMP2	35	(China) Jackie Chan DC Racing	(China) Ho-Pin Tung (United States) Gustavo Menezes (France) Thomas Laurent	Nissan VK45DE 4.5 L V8	137
3	LMP2	25	(Portugal) Algarve Pro Racing	(France) Andrea Pizzitola (United Kingdom) Michael Munemann (Italy) Andrea Roda	Ligier JS P2	137
3	LMP2	25	(Portugal) Algarve Pro Racing	(France) Andrea Pizzitola (United Kingdom) Michael Munemann (Italy) Andrea Roda	Nissan VK45DE 4.5 L V8	137
4	LMP2	24	(Portugal) Algarve Pro Racing	(South Korea) Tacksung Kim (Switzerland) Jonathan Hirschi (United States) Mark Patterson	Ligier JS P2	136
4	LMP2	24	(Portugal) Algarve Pro Racing	(South Korea) Tacksung Kim (Switzerland) Jonathan Hirschi (United States) Mark Patterson	Judd HK 3.6 L V8	136
5	**GT**	**5**	**(Hong Kong) DH Racing**	**(Italy) Michele Rugolo** **(Belgium) Stéphane Lémeret** **(France) Matthieu Vaxivière**	**Ferrari 488 GT3**	**133**
5	**GT**	**5**	**(Hong Kong) DH Racing**	**(Italy) Michele Rugolo** **(Belgium) Stéphane Lémeret** **(France) Matthieu Vaxivière**	**Ferrari F154CB 3.9 L V8**	**133**
6	**LMP3**	**26**	**(United Kingdom) Tockwith Motorsports**	**(United Kingdom) Phil Hanson** **(United Kingdom) Nigel Moore**	**Ligier JS P3**	**132**
6	**LMP3**	**26**	**(United Kingdom) Tockwith Motorsports**	**(United Kingdom) Phil Hanson** **(United Kingdom) Nigel Moore**	**Nissan VK50 5.0 L V8**	**132**
7	GT	37	(China) Team BBT	(China) Anthony Liu (Italy) Alessandro Pier Guidi (Italy) Davide Rizzo	Ferrari 488 GT3	132
7	GT	37	(China) Team BBT	(China) Anthony Liu (Italy) Alessandro Pier Guidi (Italy) Davide Rizzo	Ferrari F154CB 3.9 L V8	132
8	GT	91	(Chinese Taipei) FIST-Team AAI	(Chinese Taipei) Jun-San Chen (United Kingdom) Ollie Millroy (Austria) Philipp Eng	BMW M6 GT3	132
8	GT	91	(Chinese Taipei) FIST-Team AAI	(Chinese Taipei) Jun-San Chen (United Kingdom) Ollie Millroy (Austria) Philipp Eng	BMW 4.4 L Turbo V8	132
9	LMP3	4	(Slovakia) ARC Bratislava	(United Kingdom) Darren Burke (Slovakia) Miroslav Konôpka (United Kingdom) Mike Simpson	Ginetta-Juno LMP3	132
9	LMP3	4	(Slovakia) ARC Bratislava	(United Kingdom) Darren Burke (Slovakia) Miroslav Konôpka (United Kingdom) Mike Simpson	Nissan VK50 5.0 L V8	132
10	GT	6	(Italy) VS Racing	(Italy) Kei Cozzolino (United States) Corey Lewis (Japan) Yuhi Sekiguchi	Lamborghini Huracán GT3	132
10	GT	6	(Italy) VS Racing	(Italy) Kei Cozzolino (United States) Corey Lewis (Japan) Yuhi Sekiguchi	Lamborghini 5.2 L V10	132
11	GT	3	(Hong Kong) DH Racing	(Monaco) Olivier Beretta (Italy) Rino Mastronardi (Spain) Alex Riberas	Ferrari 488 GT3	132
11	GT	3	(Hong Kong) DH Racing	(Monaco) Olivier Beretta (Italy) Rino Mastronardi (Spain) Alex Riberas	Ferrari F154CB 3.9 L V8	132
12	GT	31	(South Korea) Team Audi Korea	(South Korea) You Kyong-Ouk (Hong Kong) Marchy Lee (Malaysia) Alex Yoong	Audi R8 LMS	132
12	GT	31	(South Korea) Team Audi Korea	(South Korea) You Kyong-Ouk (Hong Kong) Marchy Lee (Malaysia) Alex Yoong	Audi 5.2 L V10	132
13	GT	61	(Singapore) Clearwater Racing	(Republic of Ireland) Matt Griffin (Japan) Keita Sawa (Singapore) Weng Sun Mok	Ferrari 488 GT3	131
13	GT	61	(Singapore) Clearwater Racing	(Republic of Ireland) Matt Griffin (Japan) Keita Sawa (Singapore) Weng Sun Mok	Ferrari F154CB 3.9 L V8	131
14	GT	86	(Malaysia) OD Racing Best Leader Team	(Malaysia) Fairuz Fauzy (New Zealand) Jono Lester (France) Philippe Descombes	Mclaren 650S GT3	131
14	GT	86	(Malaysia) OD Racing Best Leader Team	(Malaysia) Fairuz Fauzy (New Zealand) Jono Lester (France) Philippe Descombes	McLaren 3.8 L Turbo V8	131
15	LMP3	1	(China) Jackie Chan DC Racing	(China) David Cheng (United Kingdom) James Winslow (Japan) Hiroki Yoshida	Ligier JS P3	130
15	LMP3	1	(China) Jackie Chan DC Racing	(China) David Cheng (United Kingdom) James Winslow (Japan) Hiroki Yoshida	Nissan VK50 5.0 L V8	130
16	GT	51	(Hong Kong) KCMG	(Japan) Go Max (Japan) Tetsuya Tanaka (Japan) Toru Tanaka	Audi R8 LMS	130
16	GT	51	(Hong Kong) KCMG	(Japan) Go Max (Japan) Tetsuya Tanaka (Japan) Toru Tanaka	Audi 5.2 L V10	130
17	LMP3	7	(Slovakia) ARC Bratislava	(Australia) Neale Muston (Latvia) Konstantīns Calko	Ginetta-Juno LMP3	129
17	LMP3	7	(Slovakia) ARC Bratislava	(Australia) Neale Muston (Latvia) Konstantīns Calko	Nissan VK50 5.0 L V8	129
18	LMP3	67	(Philippines) PRT Racing	(Netherlands) Ate de Jong (United Kingdom) Charlie Robertson (Estonia) Martin Rump	Ginetta-Juno LMP3	129
18	LMP3	67	(Philippines) PRT Racing	(Netherlands) Ate de Jong (United Kingdom) Charlie Robertson (Estonia) Martin Rump	Nissan VK50 5.0 L V8	129
19	GT	92	(Chinese Taipei) FIST-Team AAI	(China) Li Bin (Japan) Tatsuya Tanigawa (China) Wen He Zhang	Mercedes-AMG GT3	128
19	GT	92	(Chinese Taipei) FIST-Team AAI	(China) Li Bin (Japan) Tatsuya Tanigawa (China) Wen He Zhang	Mercedes 4.0 L M178 twin-turbo V8	128
20	GT	10	(China) FFF Racing by ACM	(United Kingdom) Matthew Bell (Japan) Hiroshi Hamaguchi (Italy) Andrea Caldarelli	Lamborghini Huracán GT3	127
20	GT	10	(China) FFF Racing by ACM	(United Kingdom) Matthew Bell (Japan) Hiroshi Hamaguchi (Italy) Andrea Caldarelli	Lamborghini 5.2 L V10	127
21	LMP3	69	(Malaysia) Aylezo Ecotint Racing	(Malaysia) Zen Low (Malaysia) Weiron Tan (United Kingdom) Riki Christodoulou	Ginetta-Juno LMP3	127
21	LMP3	69	(Malaysia) Aylezo Ecotint Racing	(Malaysia) Zen Low (Malaysia) Weiron Tan (United Kingdom) Riki Christodoulou	Nissan VK50 5.0 L V8	127
22	**GTC**	**96**	**(Japan) TKS**	**(Japan) Takuma Aoki** **(Japan) Shinyo Sano** **(Japan) Shigeto Nagashima**	**Porsche 911 GT3 Cup**	**123**
22	**GTC**	**96**	**(Japan) TKS**	**(Japan) Takuma Aoki** **(Japan) Shinyo Sano** **(Japan) Shigeto Nagashima**	**Porsche 4.0 L Flat-6**	**123**
DNF	LMP3	85	(Chinese Taipei) G-Print by Triple 1 Racing	(Chinese Taipei) Hanss Lin (Hong Kong) Shaun Thong	Ligier JS P3	110
DNF	LMP3	85	(Chinese Taipei) G-Print by Triple 1 Racing	(Chinese Taipei) Hanss Lin (Hong Kong) Shaun Thong	Nissan VK50 5.0 L V8	110
DNF	LMP3	99	(Hong Kong) Wineurasia	(Hong Kong) William Lok (Australia) Scott Andrews (Australia) Aidan Read	Ligier JS P3	59
DNF	LMP3	99	(Hong Kong) Wineurasia	(Hong Kong) William Lok (Australia) Scott Andrews (Australia) Aidan Read	Nissan VK50 5.0 L V8	59
DNF	GT	38	(Switzerland) Spirit of Race	(Portugal) Rui Águas (Italy) Marco Cioci (Singapore) Nasrat Muzayyin	Ferrari 488 GT3	25
DNF	GT	38	(Switzerland) Spirit of Race	(Portugal) Rui Águas (Italy) Marco Cioci (Singapore) Nasrat Muzayyin	Ferrari F154CB 3.9 L V8	25
DNF	LMP3	48	(Finland) PS Racing	(Italy) Angelo Negro (Italy) Louis Prette (Italy) Philippe Prette	ADESS-03	—
DNF	LMP3	48	(Finland) PS Racing	(Italy) Angelo Negro (Italy) Louis Prette (Italy) Philippe Prette	Nissan VK50 5.0 L V8	—
DNS	GT	90	(Chinese Taipei) FIST-Team AAI	(United Kingdom) Tom Blomqvist (Japan) Akira Iida (China) Lam Yu	BMW M6 GT3	—
DNS	GT	90	(Chinese Taipei) FIST-Team AAI	(United Kingdom) Tom Blomqvist (Japan) Akira Iida (China) Lam Yu	BMW 4.4 L Turbo V8	—
