= 2017 4 Hours of Sepang =

The layout of the Sepang International Circuit

The 2017 4 Hours of Sepang was an auto race held on January 22, 2017, at Sepang International Circuit in Sepang, Malaysia. It served as the last race of the 2016-17 Asian Le Mans Series season.

== Qualifying ==
=== Qualifying results ===
Pole positions in each class are indicated in bold.

Pos.	Class	No.	Entry	Chassis	Time
1	**LMP2**	**25**	**(Portugal) Algarve Pro Racing**	**Ligier JS P2-Nissan**	**1:55.279**
2	LMP2	35	(China) Jackie Chan DC Racing	Oreca 03R-Nissan	1:55.287
3	LMP2	8	(Switzerland) Race Performance	Oreca 03R-Judd	1:55.544
4	LMP2	24	(Portugal) Algarve Pro Racing	Ligier JS P2-Judd	1:58.103
5	**LMP3**	**26**	**(United Kingdom) Tockwith Motorsports**	**Ligier JS P3**	**1:59.345**
6	LMP3	99	(Hong Kong) Wineurasia	Ligier JS P3	1:59.478
7	LMP3	1	(China) Jackie Chan DC Racing	Ligier JS P3	1:59.597
8	LMP3	85	(Chinese Taipei) G-Print by Triple 1 Racing	Ligier JS P3	1:59.621
9	LMP3	67	(Philippines) PRT Racing	Ginetta-Juno LMP3	1:59.676
10	LMP3	69	(Malaysia) Aylezo Ecotint Racing	Ginetta-Juno LMP3	2:00.032
11	LMP3	4	(Slovakia) ARC Bratislava	Ginetta-Juno LMP3	2:00.199
12	LMP3	7	(Slovakia) ARC Bratislava	Ginetta-Juno LMP3	2:00.486
13	**GT**	**3**	**(Hong Kong) DH Racing**	**Ferrari 488 GT3**	**2:02.375**
14	GT	37	(China) Team BBT	Ferrari 488 GT3	2:02.379
15	GT	31	(South Korea) Team Audi Korea	Audi R8 LMS	2:02.540
16	GT	38	(Switzerland) Spirit of Race	Ferrari 488 GT3	2:02.566
17	GT	91	(Chinese Taipei) FIST-Team AAI	BMW M6 GT3	2:02.770
18	GT	61	(Singapore) Clearwater Racing	Ferrari 488 GT3	2:02.900
19	GT	90	(Chinese Taipei) FIST-Team AAI	BMW M6 GT3	2:02.904
20	GT	5	(Hong Kong) DH Racing	Ferrari 488 GT3	2:03.057
21	GT	86	(Malaysia) OD Racing Best Leader Team	Mclaren 650S GT3	2:03.293
22	GT	51	(Hong Kong) KCMG	Audi R8 LMS	2:03.848
23	LMP3	93	(Chinese Taipei) FIST-Team AAI	ADESS-03	2:04.607
24	**GTC**	**96**	**(Japan) TKS**	**Porsche 911 GT3 Cup**	**2:12.071**
25	GTC	77	(New Zealand) Team NZ	Porsche 911 GT3 Cup	2:12.287

== Race ==
=== Race results ===
Class winners are in bold.

Pos.	Class	No.	Entry	Drivers	Chassis	Laps
Pos.	Class	No.	Entry	Drivers	Engine	Laps
1	**LMP2**	**25**	**(Portugal) Algarve Pro Racing**	**(France) Andrea Pizzitola** **(Australia) Aidan Read** **(Italy) Andrea Roda**	**Ligier JS P2**	**115**
1	**LMP2**	**25**	**(Portugal) Algarve Pro Racing**	**(France) Andrea Pizzitola** **(Australia) Aidan Read** **(Italy) Andrea Roda**	**Nissan VK45DE 4.5 L V8**	**115**
2	LMP2	8	(Switzerland) Race Performance	(Switzerland) Giorgio Maggi (United Kingdom) Struan Moore (Germany) Fabian Schiller	Oreca 03R	115
2	LMP2	8	(Switzerland) Race Performance	(Switzerland) Giorgio Maggi (United Kingdom) Struan Moore (Germany) Fabian Schiller	Judd HK 3.6 L V8	115
3	LMP2	24	(Portugal) Algarve Pro Racing	(South Korea) Tacksung Kim (United Kingdom) Michael Munemann (United States) Mark Patterson	Ligier JS P2	115
3	LMP2	24	(Portugal) Algarve Pro Racing	(South Korea) Tacksung Kim (United Kingdom) Michael Munemann (United States) Mark Patterson	Judd HK 3.6 L V8	115
4	**LMP3**	**26**	**(United Kingdom) Tockwith Motorsports**	**(United Kingdom) Phil Hanson** **(United Kingdom) Nigel Moore**	**Ligier JS P3**	**112**
4	**LMP3**	**26**	**(United Kingdom) Tockwith Motorsports**	**(United Kingdom) Phil Hanson** **(United Kingdom) Nigel Moore**	**Nissan VK50 5.0 L V8**	**112**
5	LMP3	85	(Chinese Taipei) G-Print by Triple 1 Racing	(Chinese Taipei) Hanss Lin (Hong Kong) Shaun Thong	Ligier JS P3	112
5	LMP3	85	(Chinese Taipei) G-Print by Triple 1 Racing	(Chinese Taipei) Hanss Lin (Hong Kong) Shaun Thong	Nissan VK50 5.0 L V8	112
6	LMP3	1	(China) Jackie Chan DC Racing	(China) David Cheng (United Kingdom) James Winslow (Japan) Hiroki Yoshida	Ligier JS P3	112
6	LMP3	1	(China) Jackie Chan DC Racing	(China) David Cheng (United Kingdom) James Winslow (Japan) Hiroki Yoshida	Nissan VK50 5.0 L V8	112
7	**GT**	**31**	**(South Korea) Team Audi Korea**	**(South Korea) You Kyong-Ouk** **(Hong Kong) Marchy Lee** **(Malaysia) Alex Yoong**	**Audi R8 LMS**	**111**
7	**GT**	**31**	**(South Korea) Team Audi Korea**	**(South Korea) You Kyong-Ouk** **(Hong Kong) Marchy Lee** **(Malaysia) Alex Yoong**	**Audi 5.2 L V10**	**111**
8	GT	3	(Hong Kong) DH Racing	(Monaco) Olivier Beretta (Italy) Rino Mastronardi (Spain) Alex Riberas	Ferrari 488 GT3	111
8	GT	3	(Hong Kong) DH Racing	(Monaco) Olivier Beretta (Italy) Rino Mastronardi (Spain) Alex Riberas	Ferrari F154CB 3.9 L V8	111
9	GT	37	(China) Team BBT	(China) Anthony Liu (Italy) Alessandro Pier Guidi (Italy) Davide Rizzo	Ferrari 488 GT3	110
9	GT	37	(China) Team BBT	(China) Anthony Liu (Italy) Alessandro Pier Guidi (Italy) Davide Rizzo	Ferrari F154CB 3.9 L V8	110
10	GT	61	(Singapore) Clearwater Racing	(Republic of Ireland) Matt Griffin (Japan) Keita Sawa (Singapore) Weng Sun Mok	Ferrari 488 GT3	110
10	GT	61	(Singapore) Clearwater Racing	(Republic of Ireland) Matt Griffin (Japan) Keita Sawa (Singapore) Weng Sun Mok	Ferrari F154CB 3.9 L V8	110
11	GT	5	(Hong Kong) DH Racing	(Italy) Michele Rugolo (Belgium) Stéphane Lémeret (France) Matthieu Vaxivière	Ferrari 488 GT3	110
11	GT	5	(Hong Kong) DH Racing	(Italy) Michele Rugolo (Belgium) Stéphane Lémeret (France) Matthieu Vaxivière	Ferrari F154CB 3.9 L V8	110
12	GT	90	(Chinese Taipei) FIST-Team AAI	(United Kingdom) Tom Blomqvist (Japan) Akira Iida (China) Lam Yu	BMW M6 GT3	109
12	GT	90	(Chinese Taipei) FIST-Team AAI	(United Kingdom) Tom Blomqvist (Japan) Akira Iida (China) Lam Yu	BMW 4.4 L Turbo V8	109
13	GT	91	(Chinese Taipei) FIST-Team AAI	(Chinese Taipei) Jun-San Chen (United Kingdom) Ollie Millroy (Austria) Philipp Eng	BMW M6 GT3	109
13	GT	91	(Chinese Taipei) FIST-Team AAI	(Chinese Taipei) Jun-San Chen (United Kingdom) Ollie Millroy (Austria) Philipp Eng	BMW 4.4 L Turbo V8	109
14	LMP3	69	(Malaysia) Aylezo Ecotint Racing	(Malaysia) Zen Low (Malaysia) Weiron Tan (United Kingdom) Riki Christodoulou	Ginetta-Juno LMP3	109
14	LMP3	69	(Malaysia) Aylezo Ecotint Racing	(Malaysia) Zen Low (Malaysia) Weiron Tan (United Kingdom) Riki Christodoulou	Nissan VK50 5.0 L V8	109
15	GT	38	(Switzerland) Spirit of Race	(Portugal) Rui Águas (Italy) Marco Cioci (Singapore) Nasrat Muzayyin	Ferrari 488 GT3	108
15	GT	38	(Switzerland) Spirit of Race	(Portugal) Rui Águas (Italy) Marco Cioci (Singapore) Nasrat Muzayyin	Ferrari F154CB 3.9 L V8	108
16	LMP3	99	(Hong Kong) Wineurasia	(Hong Kong) William Lok (Australia) Scott Andrews (United Kingdom) Devon Modell	Ligier JS P3	108
16	LMP3	99	(Hong Kong) Wineurasia	(Hong Kong) William Lok (Australia) Scott Andrews (United Kingdom) Devon Modell	Nissan VK50 5.0 L V8	108
17	GT	51	(Hong Kong) KCMG	(Japan) Go Max (Japan) Tetsuya Tanaka (Japan) Toru Tanaka	Audi R8 LMS	102
17	GT	51	(Hong Kong) KCMG	(Japan) Go Max (Japan) Tetsuya Tanaka (Japan) Toru Tanaka	Audi 5.2 L V10	102
18	**GTC**	**96**	**(Japan) TKS**	**(Japan) Takuma Aoki** **(Japan) Shinyo Sano** **(Japan) Shigeto Nagashima**	**Porsche 911 GT3 Cup**	**101**
18	**GTC**	**96**	**(Japan) TKS**	**(Japan) Takuma Aoki** **(Japan) Shinyo Sano** **(Japan) Shigeto Nagashima**	**Porsche 4.0 L Flat-6**	**101**
19	GTC	77	(New Zealand) Team NZ	(Republic of Ireland) John Curran (New Zealand) Graeme Dowsett (New Zealand) Will Bamber	Porsche 911 GT3 Cup	101
19	GTC	77	(New Zealand) Team NZ	(Republic of Ireland) John Curran (New Zealand) Graeme Dowsett (New Zealand) Will Bamber	Porsche 4.0 L Flat-6	101
20	LMP3	4	(Slovakia) ARC Bratislava	(United Kingdom) Darren Burke (Latvia) Konstantīns Calko	Ginetta-Juno LMP3	95
20	LMP3	4	(Slovakia) ARC Bratislava	(United Kingdom) Darren Burke (Latvia) Konstantīns Calko	Nissan VK50 5.0 L V8	95
21	LMP3	7	(Slovakia) ARC Bratislava	(Australia) Neale Muston (Slovakia) Miroslav Konôpka (United Kingdom) Mike Simpson	Ginetta-Juno LMP3	95
21	LMP3	7	(Slovakia) ARC Bratislava	(Australia) Neale Muston (Slovakia) Miroslav Konôpka (United Kingdom) Mike Simpson	Nissan VK50 5.0 L V8	95
DNF	LMP3	67	(Philippines) PRT Racing	(Netherlands) Ate de Jong (United Kingdom) Charlie Robertson	Ginetta-Juno LMP3	92
DNF	LMP3	67	(Philippines) PRT Racing	(Netherlands) Ate de Jong (United Kingdom) Charlie Robertson	Nissan VK50 5.0 L V8	92
DNF	LMP3	93	(Chinese Taipei) FIST-Team AAI	(Chinese Taipei) Huang Chi (Japan) Ryohei Sakaguchi (Japan) Tatsuya Tanigawa	ADESS-03	9
DNF	LMP3	93	(Chinese Taipei) FIST-Team AAI	(Chinese Taipei) Huang Chi (Japan) Ryohei Sakaguchi (Japan) Tatsuya Tanigawa	Nissan VK50 5.0 L V8	9
DNF	LMP2	35	(China) Jackie Chan DC Racing	(China) Ho-Pin Tung (United States) Gustavo Menezes (France) Thomas Laurent	Oreca 03R	8
DNF	LMP2	35	(China) Jackie Chan DC Racing	(China) Ho-Pin Tung (United States) Gustavo Menezes (France) Thomas Laurent	Nissan VK45DE 4.5 L V8	8
