= 2016 4 Hours of Zhuhai =

The Track map of Zhuhai International Circuit

The 2016 4 Hours of Zhuhai was an auto race held on 30 October 2016 at the Zhuhai International Circuit in Zhuhai, China and served as the opening round of the 2016-17 Asian Le Mans Series.

== Qualifying results ==
Pole positions in each class are indicated in bold.

Pos.	Class	No.	Entry	Chassis	Time
1	**LMP2**	**25**	**(Portugal) Algarve Pro Racing**	**Ligier JS P2-Nissan**	**1:38.155**
2	LMP2	35	(China) Jackie Chan DC Racing	Oreca 03R-Nissan	1:38.429
3	LMP2	24	(Portugal) Algarve Pro Racing	Ligier JS P2-Judd	1:40.540
4	LMP2	8	(Switzerland) Race Performance	Oreca 03R-Judd	1:41.170
5	**LMP3**	**99**	**(Hong Kong) Wineurasia**	**Ligier JS P3**	**1:41.346**
6	LMP3	69	(Malaysia) Aylezo Ecotint Racing	Ginetta-Juno LMP3	1:41.582
7	LMP3	67	(Philippines) PRT Racing	Ginetta-Juno LMP3	1:41.745
8	LMP3	4	(Slovakia) ARC Bratislava	Ginetta-Juno LMP3	1:41.903
9	LMP3	26	(United Kingdom) Tockwith Motorsports	Ligier JS P3	1:41.973
10	LMP3	1	(China) Jackie Chan DC Racing	Ligier JS P3	1:41.996
11	**GT**	**38**	**(Switzerland) Spirit of Race**	**Ferrari 488 GT3**	**1:42.152**
12	GT	37	(China) Team BBT	Ferrari 488 GT3	1:42.274
13	GT	61	(Singapore) Clearwater Racing	Ferrari 488 GT3	1:42.337
14	GT	2	(China) Absolute Racing	Audi R8 LMS	1:42.521
15	GT	10	(China) FFF Racing by ACM	Lamborghini Huracán GT3	1:42.812
16	GT	66	(China) TianShi Racing Team	Audi R8 LMS ultra	1:42.878
17	LMP3	85	(Chinese Taipei) G-Print by Triple 1 Racing	Ligier JS P3	1:42.911
18	GT	5	(Hong Kong) DH Racing	Ferrari 488 GT3	1:43.009
19	GT	6	(Italy) VS Racing	Lamborghini Huracán GT3	1:43.178
20	GT	86	(Malaysia) OD Racing Best Leader Team	Mclaren 650S GT3	1:43.483
21	GT	51	(Hong Kong) KCMG	Audi R8 LMS	1:43.670
22	GT	3	(Hong Kong) DH Racing	Ferrari 488 GT3	1:44.054
23	LMP3	7	(Slovakia) ARC Bratislava	Ginetta-Juno LMP3	1:44.064
24	GT	88	(China) Team Bentley Absolute	Bentley Continental GT3	1:44.473
25	GT	90	(Chinese Taipei) FIST-Team AAI	BMW M6 GT3	1:44.882
26	**CN**	**68**	**(Finland) PS Racing**	**Ligier JS53**	**1:48.137**
27	LMP3	48	(Finland) PS Racing	ADESS-03	1:48.398
28	GT	91	(Chinese Taipei) FIST-Team AAI	Mclaren 650S GT3	1:45.738
29	GT	92	(Chinese Taipei) FIST-Team AAI	Mercedes-AMG GT3	—

== Race results ==
Class winners are in bold.

Pos.	Class	No.	Entry	Drivers	Chassis	Laps
Pos.	Class	No.	Entry	Drivers	Engine	Laps
1	**LMP2**	**35**	**(China) Jackie Chan DC Racing**	**(China) Ho-Pin Tung** **(United States) Gustavo Menezes**	**Oreca 03R**	**146**
1	**LMP2**	**35**	**(China) Jackie Chan DC Racing**	**(China) Ho-Pin Tung** **(United States) Gustavo Menezes**	**Nissan VK45DE 4.5 L V8**	**146**
2	LMP2	24	(Portugal) Algarve Pro Racing	(South Korea) Tacksung Kim (United States) Matt McMurry (Italy) Andrea Roda	Ligier JS P2	146
2	LMP2	24	(Portugal) Algarve Pro Racing	(South Korea) Tacksung Kim (United States) Matt McMurry (Italy) Andrea Roda	Judd HK 3.6 L V8	146
3	LMP2	25	(Portugal) Algarve Pro Racing	(France) Andrea Pizzitola (United Kingdom) Michael Munemann (Netherlands) Nicky Catsburg	Ligier JS P2	143
3	LMP2	25	(Portugal) Algarve Pro Racing	(France) Andrea Pizzitola (United Kingdom) Michael Munemann (Netherlands) Nicky Catsburg	Nissan VK45DE 4.5 L V8	143
4	**LMP3**	**1**	**(China) Jackie Chan DC Racing**	**(China) David Cheng** **(United Kingdom) James Winslow** **(China) Pu Jun Jin**	**Ligier JS P3**	**142**
4	**LMP3**	**1**	**(China) Jackie Chan DC Racing**	**(China) David Cheng** **(United Kingdom) James Winslow** **(China) Pu Jun Jin**	**Nissan VK50VE 5.0 L V8**	**142**
5	**GT**	**38**	**(Switzerland) Spirit of Race**	**(Portugal) Rui Águas** **(Italy) Marco Cioci** **(Singapore) Nasrat Muzayyin**	**Ferrari 488 GT3**	**142**
5	**GT**	**38**	**(Switzerland) Spirit of Race**	**(Portugal) Rui Águas** **(Italy) Marco Cioci** **(Singapore) Nasrat Muzayyin**	**Ferrari F154CB 3.9 L V8**	**142**
6	GT	61	(Singapore) Clearwater Racing	(Republic of Ireland) Matt Griffin (Japan) Keita Sawa (Singapore) Weng Sun Mok	Ferrari 488 GT3	142
6	GT	61	(Singapore) Clearwater Racing	(Republic of Ireland) Matt Griffin (Japan) Keita Sawa (Singapore) Weng Sun Mok	Ferrari F154CB 3.9 L V8	142
7	GT	6	(Italy) VS Racing	(Italy) Kei Cozzolino (United States) Corey Lewis (South Africa) Adrian Zaugg	Lamborghini Huracán GT3	141
7	GT	6	(Italy) VS Racing	(Italy) Kei Cozzolino (United States) Corey Lewis (South Africa) Adrian Zaugg	Lamborghini DGF 5.2 L V10	141
8	GT	5	(Hong Kong) DH Racing	(Italy) Michele Rugolo (Belgium) Frédéric Vervisch (China) Chaoyin Wei	Ferrari 488 GT3	140
8	GT	5	(Hong Kong) DH Racing	(Italy) Michele Rugolo (Belgium) Frédéric Vervisch (China) Chaoyin Wei	Ferrari F154CB 3.9 L V8	140
9	GT	2	(China) Absolute Racing	(China) Cheng Congfu (China) Steven Lin (Belgium) Alessio Picariello	Audi R8 LMS	140
9	GT	2	(China) Absolute Racing	(China) Cheng Congfu (China) Steven Lin (Belgium) Alessio Picariello	Audi DAR 5.2 L V10	140
10	LMP3	26	(United Kingdom) Tockwith Motorsports	(United Kingdom) Phil Hanson (United Kingdom) Nigel Moore	Ligier JS P3	140
10	LMP3	26	(United Kingdom) Tockwith Motorsports	(United Kingdom) Phil Hanson (United Kingdom) Nigel Moore	Nissan VK50VE 5.0 L V8	140
11	GT	51	(Hong Kong) KCMG	(Japan) Go Max (Japan) Tetsuya Tanaka (Japan) Toru Tanaka	Audi R8 LMS	140
11	GT	51	(Hong Kong) KCMG	(Japan) Go Max (Japan) Tetsuya Tanaka (Japan) Toru Tanaka	Audi DAR 5.2 L V10	140
12	LMP3	85	(Chinese Taipei) G-Print by Triple 1 Racing	(Chinese Taipei) Hanss Lin (Colombia) Julio Acosta	Ligier JS P3	138
12	LMP3	85	(Chinese Taipei) G-Print by Triple 1 Racing	(Chinese Taipei) Hanss Lin (Colombia) Julio Acosta	Nissan VK50VE 5.0 L V8	138
13	LMP3	4	(Slovakia) ARC Bratislava	(United Kingdom) Darren Burke (Slovakia) Miroslav Konôpka (United Kingdom) Mike Simpson	Ginetta-Juno LMP3	133
13	LMP3	4	(Slovakia) ARC Bratislava	(United Kingdom) Darren Burke (Slovakia) Miroslav Konôpka (United Kingdom) Mike Simpson	Nissan VK50VE 5.0 L V8	133
14	LMP3	7	(Slovakia) ARC Bratislava	(Australia) Neale Muston (Latvia) Konstantīns Calko	Ginetta-Juno LMP3	132
14	LMP3	7	(Slovakia) ARC Bratislava	(Australia) Neale Muston (Latvia) Konstantīns Calko	Nissan VK50VE 5.0 L V8	132
15	LMP3	99	(Hong Kong) Wineurasia	(Hong Kong) William Lok (United Kingdom) Richard Bradley (France) Philippe Descombes	Ligier JS P3	122
15	LMP3	99	(Hong Kong) Wineurasia	(Hong Kong) William Lok (United Kingdom) Richard Bradley (France) Philippe Descombes	Nissan VK50VE 5.0 L V8	122
16	LMP3	48	(Finland) PS Racing	(Italy) Angelo Negro (Italy) Louis Prette (Italy) Philippe Prette	ADESS-03	108
16	LMP3	48	(Finland) PS Racing	(Italy) Angelo Negro (Italy) Louis Prette (Italy) Philippe Prette	Nissan VK50VE 5.0 L V8	108
17	GT	88	(China) Team Bentley Absolute	(Hong Kong) Adderly Fong (Chinese Taipei) Jeffrey Lee (Hong Kong) Vincent Wong	Bentley Continental GT3	105
17	GT	88	(China) Team Bentley Absolute	(Hong Kong) Adderly Fong (Chinese Taipei) Jeffrey Lee (Hong Kong) Vincent Wong	Bentley EA824 4.0 L Turbo V8	105
DNF	LMP2	8	(Switzerland) Race Performance	(Switzerland) Giorgio Maggi (United Kingdom) Struan Moore	Oreca 03R	139
DNF	LMP2	8	(Switzerland) Race Performance	(Switzerland) Giorgio Maggi (United Kingdom) Struan Moore	Judd HK 3.6 L V8	139
DNF	GT	3	(Hong Kong) DH Racing	(Monaco) Olivier Beretta (Italy) Rino Mastronardi (Spain) Alex Riberas	Ferrari 488 GT3	130
DNF	GT	3	(Hong Kong) DH Racing	(Monaco) Olivier Beretta (Italy) Rino Mastronardi (Spain) Alex Riberas	Ferrari F154CB 3.9 L V8	130
DNF	GT	91	(Chinese Taipei) FIST-Team AAI	(Chinese Taipei) Jun-San Chen (United Kingdom) Ollie Millroy (Netherlands) Xavier Maassen	Mclaren 650S GT3	127
DNF	GT	91	(Chinese Taipei) FIST-Team AAI	(Chinese Taipei) Jun-San Chen (United Kingdom) Ollie Millroy (Netherlands) Xavier Maassen	McLaren M838T 3.8 L Turbo V8	127
NC	LMP3	69	(Malaysia) Aylezo Ecotint Racing	(Malaysia) Zen Low (Malaysia) Weiron Tan (Italy) Giacomo Barri	Ginetta-Juno LMP3	99
NC	LMP3	69	(Malaysia) Aylezo Ecotint Racing	(Malaysia) Zen Low (Malaysia) Weiron Tan (Italy) Giacomo Barri	Nissan VK50VE 5.0 L V8	99
DNF	LMP3	67	(Philippines) PRT Racing	(Netherlands) Ate de Jong (United Kingdom) Charlie Robertson (Estonia) Martin Rump	Ginetta-Juno LMP3	97
DNF	LMP3	67	(Philippines) PRT Racing	(Netherlands) Ate de Jong (United Kingdom) Charlie Robertson (Estonia) Martin Rump	Nissan VK50VE 5.0 L V8	97
DNF	GT	10	(China) FFF Racing by ACM	(United Kingdom) Matthew Bell (Japan) Hiroshi Hamaguchi (Italy) Andrea Caldarelli	Lamborghini Huracán GT3	91
DNF	GT	10	(China) FFF Racing by ACM	(United Kingdom) Matthew Bell (Japan) Hiroshi Hamaguchi (Italy) Andrea Caldarelli	Lamborghini DGF 5.2 L V10	91
DNF	GT	90	(Chinese Taipei) FIST-Team AAI	(United Kingdom) Tom Blomqvist (Japan) Akira Iida (China) Lam Yu	BMW M6 GT3	86
DNF	GT	90	(Chinese Taipei) FIST-Team AAI	(United Kingdom) Tom Blomqvist (Japan) Akira Iida (China) Lam Yu	BMW S63 4.4 L Turbo V8	86
DNF	GT	92	(Chinese Taipei) FIST-Team AAI	(China) Li Bin (Japan) Tatsuya Tanigawa (Chinese Taipei) Huang Chi	Mercedes-AMG GT3	86
DNF	GT	92	(Chinese Taipei) FIST-Team AAI	(China) Li Bin (Japan) Tatsuya Tanigawa (Chinese Taipei) Huang Chi	Mercedes-AMG M159 6.2 L V8	86
NC	GT	86	(Malaysia) OD Racing Best Leader Team	(Malaysia) Fairuz Fauzy (New Zealand) Jono Lester (China) Tang Chi Lun	Mclaren 650S GT3	46
NC	GT	86	(Malaysia) OD Racing Best Leader Team	(Malaysia) Fairuz Fauzy (New Zealand) Jono Lester (China) Tang Chi Lun	McLaren M838T 3.8 L Turbo V8	46
DNF	CN	68	(Finland) PS Racing	(Japan) Kenji Abe (Japan) Akihiro Asai (China) Qin Tianqi	Ligier JS53	37
DNF	CN	68	(Finland) PS Racing	(Japan) Kenji Abe (Japan) Akihiro Asai (China) Qin Tianqi	Honda K20A 2.0 L I4	37
DNF	GT	66	(China) TianShi Racing Team	(Germany) Christopher Haase (China) Peng Liu (Italy) Max Wiser	Audi R8 LMS ultra	15
DNF	GT	66	(China) TianShi Racing Team	(Germany) Christopher Haase (China) Peng Liu (Italy) Max Wiser	Audi CJJ 5.2 L V10	15
DNS	GT	37	(China) Team BBT	(China) Anthony Liu (Italy) Alessandro Pier Guidi (Italy) Davide Rizzo	Ferrari 488 GT3	—
DNS	GT	37	(China) Team BBT	(China) Anthony Liu (Italy) Alessandro Pier Guidi (Italy) Davide Rizzo	Ferrari F154CB 3.9 L V8	—
