= 2017 4 Hours of Buriram =

The Track map of the Buriram International Circuit

The 2017 4 Hours of Buriam was the third round of the 2016-17 Asian Le Mans Series season. It took place on January 10, 2017, at Buriram International Circuit in Buriram, Thailand.

== Qualifying results ==
Pole positions in each class are indicated in bold.

Pos.	Class	No.	Entry	Chassis	Time
1	**LMP2**	**35**	**(China) Jackie Chan DC Racing**	**Oreca 03R-Nissan**	**1:26.954**
2	LMP2	25	(Portugal) Algarve Pro Racing	Ligier JS P2-Nissan	1:27.616
3	LMP2	8	(Switzerland) Race Performance	Oreca 03R-Judd	1:27.970
4	LMP2	24	(Portugal) Algarve Pro Racing	Ligier JS P2-Judd	1:29.532
5	**LMP3**	**26**	**(United Kingdom) Tockwith Motorsports**	**Ligier JS P3**	**1:30.154**
6	LMP3	99	(Hong Kong) Wineurasia	Ligier JS P3	1:30.825
7	LMP3	67	(Philippines) PRT Racing	Ginetta-Juno LMP3	1:30.879
8	LMP3	1	(China) Jackie Chan DC Racing	Ligier JS P3	1:31.155
9	LMP3	85	(Chinese Taipei) G-Print by Triple 1 Racing	Ligier JS P3	1:31.303
10	LMP3	4	(Slovakia) ARC Bratislava	Ginetta-Juno LMP3	1:31.412
11	LMP3	69	(Malaysia) Aylezo Ecotint Racing	Ginetta-Juno LMP3	1:31.448
12	LMP3	7	(Slovakia) ARC Bratislava	Ginetta-Juno LMP3	1:31.555
13	**GT**	**37**	**(China) Team BBT**	**Ferrari 488 GT3**	**1:31.858**
14	GT	38	(Switzerland) Spirit of Race	Ferrari 488 GT3	1:31.889
15	GT	90	(Chinese Taipei) FIST-Team AAI	BMW M6 GT3	1:31.972
16	GT	3	(Hong Kong) DH Racing	Ferrari 488 GT3	1:32.020
17	GT	61	(Singapore) Clearwater Racing	Ferrari 488 GT3	1:32.178
18	GT	91	(Chinese Taipei) FIST-Team AAI	BMW M6 GT3	1:32.424
19	GT	5	(Hong Kong) DH Racing	Ferrari 488 GT3	1:32.616
20	GT	31	(South Korea) Team Audi Korea	Audi R8 LMS	1:32.716
21	GT	6	(Italy) VS Racing	Lamborghini Huracán GT3	1:32.910
22	GT	10	(China) FFF Racing by ACM	Lamborghini Huracán GT3	1:33.530
23	GT	86	(Malaysia) OD Racing Best Leader Team	Mclaren 650S GT3	1:33.745
24	GT	51	(Hong Kong) KCMG	Audi R8 LMS	1:33.870
25	**GTC**	**77**	**(New Zealand) Team NZ**	**Porsche 911 GT3 Cup**	**1:46.187**
26	**CN**	**68**	**(Finland) PS Racing**	**Ligier JS53**	**1:49.118**

== Race results ==
Class winners are in bold.

Pos.	Class	No.	Entry	Drivers	Chassis	Laps
Pos.	Class	No.	Entry	Drivers	Engine	Laps
1	**LMP2**	**35**	**(China) Jackie Chan DC Racing**	**(China) Ho-Pin Tung** **(United States) Gustavo Menezes** **(France) Thomas Laurent**	**Oreca 03R**	**154**
1	**LMP2**	**35**	**(China) Jackie Chan DC Racing**	**(China) Ho-Pin Tung** **(United States) Gustavo Menezes** **(France) Thomas Laurent**	**Nissan VK45DE 4.5 L V8**	**154**
2	LMP2	25	(Portugal) Algarve Pro Racing	(France) Andrea Pizzitola (United States) Matt McMurry (Italy) Andrea Roda	Ligier JS P2	154
2	LMP2	25	(Portugal) Algarve Pro Racing	(France) Andrea Pizzitola (United States) Matt McMurry (Italy) Andrea Roda	Nissan VK45DE 4.5 L V8	154
3	LMP2	24	(Portugal) Algarve Pro Racing	(South Korea) Tacksung Kim (United Kingdom) Michael Munemann (United States) Mark Patterson	Ligier JS P2	151
3	LMP2	24	(Portugal) Algarve Pro Racing	(South Korea) Tacksung Kim (United Kingdom) Michael Munemann (United States) Mark Patterson	Judd HK 3.6 L V8	151
4	LMP2	8	(Switzerland) Race Performance	(Switzerland) Giorgio Maggi (United Kingdom) Struan Moore (Germany) Fabian Schiller	Oreca 03R	148
4	LMP2	8	(Switzerland) Race Performance	(Switzerland) Giorgio Maggi (United Kingdom) Struan Moore (Germany) Fabian Schiller	Judd HK 3.6 L V8	148
5	**GT**	**3**	**(Hong Kong) DH Racing**	**(Monaco) Olivier Beretta** **(Italy) Rino Mastronardi** **(Spain) Alex Riberas**	**Ferrari 488 GT3**	**147**
5	**GT**	**3**	**(Hong Kong) DH Racing**	**(Monaco) Olivier Beretta** **(Italy) Rino Mastronardi** **(Spain) Alex Riberas**	**Ferrari F154CB 3.9 L V8**	**147**
6	GT	37	(China) Team BBT	(China) Anthony Liu (Italy) Alessandro Pier Guidi (Italy) Davide Rizzo	Ferrari 488 GT3	147
6	GT	37	(China) Team BBT	(China) Anthony Liu (Italy) Alessandro Pier Guidi (Italy) Davide Rizzo	Ferrari F154CB 3.9 L V8	147
7 (Note: The No. 5 DH Racing entry was given a post race penalty for driving too slow in the fast lane of the pits.)	GT	5	(Hong Kong) DH Racing	(Italy) Michele Rugolo (Belgium) Stéphane Lémeret (France) Matthieu Vaxivière	Ferrari 488 GT3	147
7	GT	5	(Hong Kong) DH Racing	(Italy) Michele Rugolo (Belgium) Stéphane Lémeret (France) Matthieu Vaxivière	Ferrari F154CB 3.9 L V8	147
8	GT	90	(Chinese Taipei) FIST-Team AAI	(United Kingdom) Tom Blomqvist (Japan) Akira Iida (Finland) Jesse Krohn	BMW M6 GT3	146
8	GT	90	(Chinese Taipei) FIST-Team AAI	(United Kingdom) Tom Blomqvist (Japan) Akira Iida (Finland) Jesse Krohn	BMW 4.4 L Turbo V8	146
9	**LMP3**	**4**	**(Slovakia) ARC Bratislava**	**(United Kingdom) Darren Burke** **(Slovakia) Miroslav Konôpka** **(United Kingdom) Mike Simpson**	**Ginetta-Juno LMP3**	**146**
9	**LMP3**	**4**	**(Slovakia) ARC Bratislava**	**(United Kingdom) Darren Burke** **(Slovakia) Miroslav Konôpka** **(United Kingdom) Mike Simpson**	**Nissan VK50 5.0 L V8**	**146**
10	LMP3	7	(Slovakia) ARC Bratislava	(Australia) Neale Muston (Latvia) Konstantīns Calko	Ginetta-Juno LMP3	146
10	LMP3	7	(Slovakia) ARC Bratislava	(Australia) Neale Muston (Latvia) Konstantīns Calko	Nissan VK50 5.0 L V8	146
11	GT	91	(Chinese Taipei) FIST-Team AAI	(Chinese Taipei) Jun-San Chen (United Kingdom) Ollie Millroy (Austria) Philipp Eng	BMW M6 GT3	145
11	GT	91	(Chinese Taipei) FIST-Team AAI	(Chinese Taipei) Jun-San Chen (United Kingdom) Ollie Millroy (Austria) Philipp Eng	BMW 4.4 L Turbo V8	145
12	LMP3	85	(Chinese Taipei) G-Print by Triple 1 Racing	(Chinese Taipei) Hanss Lin (Hong Kong) Shaun Thong (Japan) Ryuichirou Ohtsuka	Ligier JS P3	145
12	LMP3	85	(Chinese Taipei) G-Print by Triple 1 Racing	(Chinese Taipei) Hanss Lin (Hong Kong) Shaun Thong (Japan) Ryuichirou Ohtsuka	Nissan VK50 5.0 L V8	145
13	GT	61	(Singapore) Clearwater Racing	(Republic of Ireland) Matt Griffin (Japan) Keita Sawa (Singapore) Weng Sun Mok	Ferrari 488 GT3	145
13	GT	61	(Singapore) Clearwater Racing	(Republic of Ireland) Matt Griffin (Japan) Keita Sawa (Singapore) Weng Sun Mok	Ferrari F154CB 3.9 L V8	145
14	GT	10	(China) FFF Racing by ACM	(United Kingdom) Matthew Bell (Japan) Hiroshi Hamaguchi (Italy) Vitantonio Liuzzi	Lamborghini Huracán GT3	144
14	GT	10	(China) FFF Racing by ACM	(United Kingdom) Matthew Bell (Japan) Hiroshi Hamaguchi (Italy) Vitantonio Liuzzi	Lamborghini 5.2 L V10	144
15	LMP3	67	(Philippines) PRT Racing	(Netherlands) Ate de Jong (United Kingdom) Charlie Robertson	Ginetta-Juno LMP3	144
15	LMP3	67	(Philippines) PRT Racing	(Netherlands) Ate de Jong (United Kingdom) Charlie Robertson	Nissan VK50 5.0 L V8	144
16	GT	38	(Switzerland) Spirit of Race	(Portugal) Rui Águas (Italy) Marco Cioci (Singapore) Nasrat Muzayyin	Ferrari 488 GT3	144
16	GT	38	(Switzerland) Spirit of Race	(Portugal) Rui Águas (Italy) Marco Cioci (Singapore) Nasrat Muzayyin	Ferrari F154CB 3.9 L V8	144
17	LMP3	99	(Hong Kong) Wineurasia	(Hong Kong) William Lok (Australia) Scott Andrews (Australia) Aidan Read	Ligier JS P3	144
17	LMP3	99	(Hong Kong) Wineurasia	(Hong Kong) William Lok (Australia) Scott Andrews (Australia) Aidan Read	Nissan VK50 5.0 L V8	144
18	GT	31	(South Korea) Team Audi Korea	(South Korea) You Kyong-Ouk (Hong Kong) Marchy Lee (Malaysia) Alex Yoong	Audi R8 LMS	143
18	GT	31	(South Korea) Team Audi Korea	(South Korea) You Kyong-Ouk (Hong Kong) Marchy Lee (Malaysia) Alex Yoong	Audi 5.2 L V10	143
19	GT	51	(Hong Kong) KCMG	(Japan) Go Max (Japan) Tetsuya Tanaka (Japan) Toru Tanaka	Audi R8 LMS	143
19	GT	51	(Hong Kong) KCMG	(Japan) Go Max (Japan) Tetsuya Tanaka (Japan) Toru Tanaka	Audi 5.2 L V10	143
20	LMP3	1	(China) Jackie Chan DC Racing	(China) David Cheng (United Kingdom) James Winslow (Japan) Hiroki Yoshida	Ligier JS P3	141
20	LMP3	1	(China) Jackie Chan DC Racing	(China) David Cheng (United Kingdom) James Winslow (Japan) Hiroki Yoshida	Nissan VK50 5.0 L V8	141
21	LMP3	26	(United Kingdom) Tockwith Motorsports	(United Kingdom) Phil Hanson (United Kingdom) Nigel Moore	Ligier JS P3	132
21	LMP3	26	(United Kingdom) Tockwith Motorsports	(United Kingdom) Phil Hanson (United Kingdom) Nigel Moore	Nissan VK50 5.0 L V8	132
22	LMP3	69	(Malaysia) Aylezo Ecotint Racing	(Malaysia) Zen Low (Malaysia) Weiron Tan (United Kingdom) Riki Christodoulou	Ginetta-Juno LMP3	131
22	LMP3	69	(Malaysia) Aylezo Ecotint Racing	(Malaysia) Zen Low (Malaysia) Weiron Tan (United Kingdom) Riki Christodoulou	Nissan VK50 5.0 L V8	131
23	**GTC**	**77**	**(New Zealand) Team NZ**	**(Republic of Ireland) John Curran** **(New Zealand) Graeme Dowsett** **(Thailand) Paul Kanjanapas**	**Porsche 911 GT3 Cup**	**128**
23	**GTC**	**77**	**(New Zealand) Team NZ**	**(Republic of Ireland) John Curran** **(New Zealand) Graeme Dowsett** **(Thailand) Paul Kanjanapas**	**Porsche 4.0 L Flat-6**	**128**
DNF	GT	86	(Malaysia) OD Racing Best Leader Team	(Malaysia) Fairuz Fauzy (New Zealand) Jono Lester (Australia) Liam Talbot	Mclaren 650S GT3	135
DNF	GT	86	(Malaysia) OD Racing Best Leader Team	(Malaysia) Fairuz Fauzy (New Zealand) Jono Lester (Australia) Liam Talbot	McLaren 3.8 L Turbo V8	135
DNF	GT	6	(Italy) VS Racing	(Italy) Kei Cozzolino (United States) Corey Lewis (Japan) Yuhi Sekiguchi	Lamborghini Huracán GT3	132
DNF	GT	6	(Italy) VS Racing	(Italy) Kei Cozzolino (United States) Corey Lewis (Japan) Yuhi Sekiguchi	Lamborghini 5.2 L V10	132
DNF	CN	68	(Finland) PS Racing	(Thailand) Tira Sosothikul (Thailand) Medhapan Sundaradeja	Ligier JS53	6
DNF	CN	68	(Finland) PS Racing	(Thailand) Tira Sosothikul (Thailand) Medhapan Sundaradeja	Honda 2.0 L I4	6
