= 2016–17 Asian Le Mans Series =

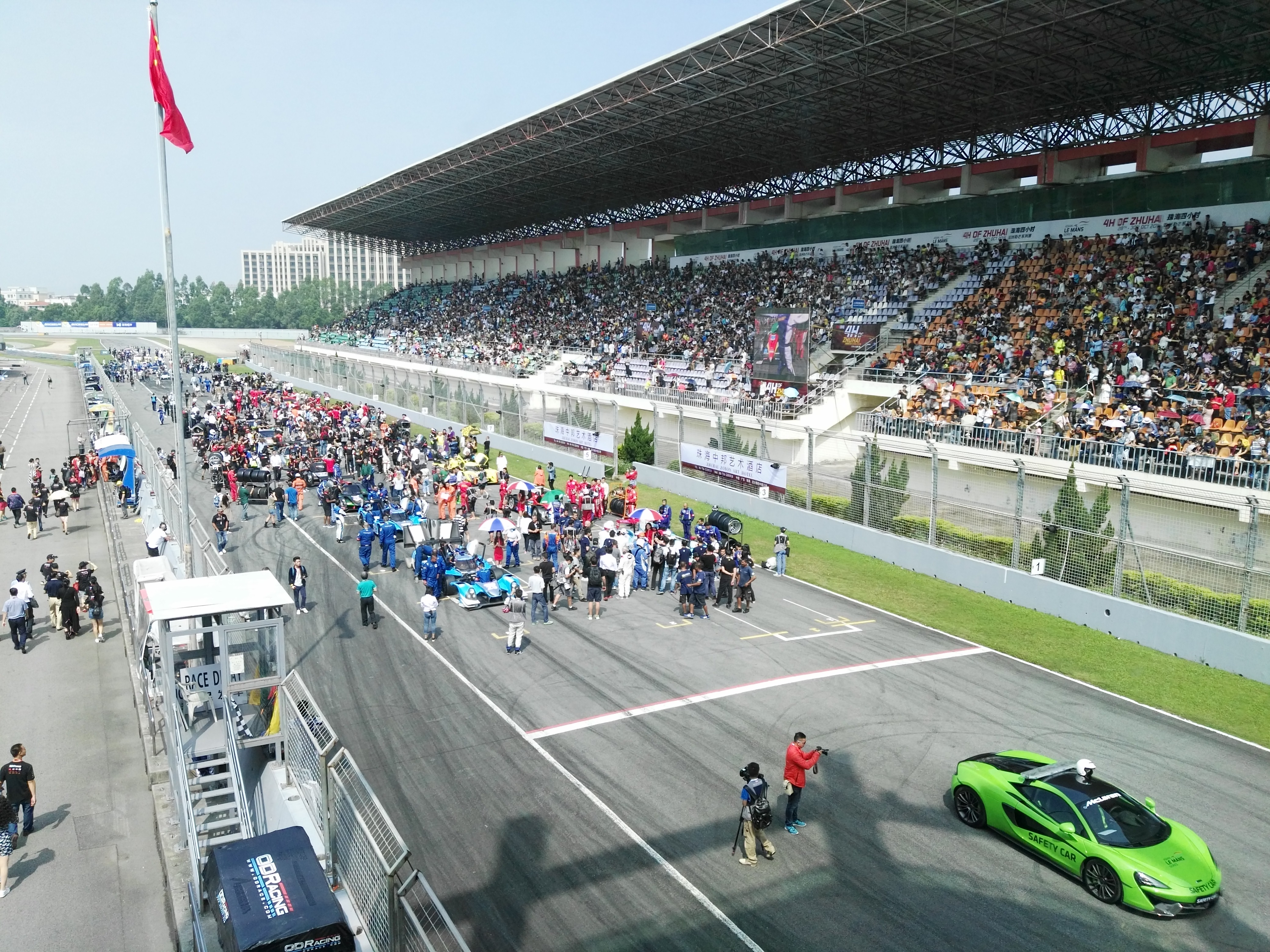
2016-17 Asian Le Mans Series Zhuhai Round starting grid.

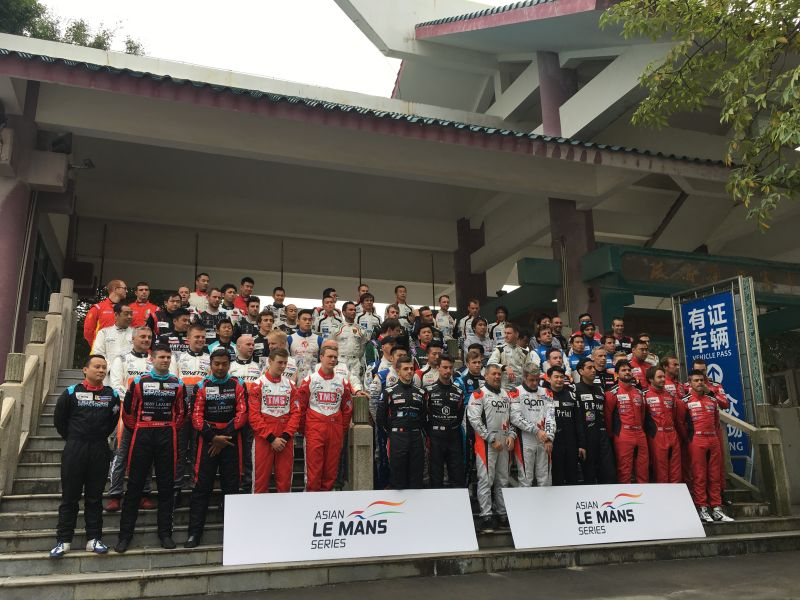
2016-17 Asian Le Mans Series drivers group photo.

The 2016–17 Asian Le Mans Series was the fifth season of the Automobile Club de l'Ouest's Asian Le Mans Series. It is the fourth 24 Hours of Le Mans-based series created by the ACO, following the American Le Mans Series (since merged with the Rolex Sports Car Series to form the United SportsCar Championship), the European Le Mans Series and the FIA World Endurance Championship. The four event season begun at the Zhuhai International Circuit on 30 October 2016 and ended at Sepang International Circuit in Selangor on 22 January 2017.

== Calendar ==
The 2016–2017 calendar was revealed on 27 January 2016.

Rnd	Race	Circuit	Date
1	4 Hours of Zhuhai	Zhuhai International Circuit, Zhuhai, China	30 October 2016
2	4 Hours of Fuji	Fuji Speedway, Oyama, Japan	4 December 2016
3	4 Hours of Buriram	Chang International Circuit, Buriram, Thailand	8 January 2017
4	4 Hours of Sepang	Sepang International Circuit, Selangor, Malaysia	22 January 2017

== Entry list ==
=== LMP2 ===
Entrant/Team	Car	Engine	Class	No.	Drivers	Rounds
(Switzerland) Race Performance	Oreca 03R	Judd HK 3.6 L V8	P2	8	(Switzerland) Giorgio Maggi	All
(Switzerland) Race Performance	Oreca 03R	Judd HK 3.6 L V8	P2	8	(United Kingdom) Struan Moore	All
(Switzerland) Race Performance	Oreca 03R	Judd HK 3.6 L V8	P2	8	(Germany) Fabian Schiller	2–4
(Portugal) Algarve Pro Racing	Ligier JS P2	Judd HK 3.6 L V8	P2	24	(South Korea) Tacksung Kim	All
(Portugal) Algarve Pro Racing	Ligier JS P2	Judd HK 3.6 L V8	P2	24	(United States) Matt McMurry	1
(Portugal) Algarve Pro Racing	Ligier JS P2	Judd HK 3.6 L V8	P2	24	(Italy) Andrea Roda	1
(Portugal) Algarve Pro Racing	Ligier JS P2	Judd HK 3.6 L V8	P2	24	(United States) Mark Patterson	2–4
(Portugal) Algarve Pro Racing	Ligier JS P2	Judd HK 3.6 L V8	P2	24	(Switzerland) Jonathan Hirschi	2
(Portugal) Algarve Pro Racing	Ligier JS P2	Judd HK 3.6 L V8	P2	24	(United Kingdom) Michael Munemann	3–4
(Portugal) Algarve Pro Racing	Ligier JS P2	Nissan VK45DE 4.5 L V8	P2	25	(France) Andrea Pizzitola	All
(Portugal) Algarve Pro Racing	Ligier JS P2	Nissan VK45DE 4.5 L V8	P2	25	(United Kingdom) Michael Munemann	1–2
(Portugal) Algarve Pro Racing	Ligier JS P2	Nissan VK45DE 4.5 L V8	P2	25	(Netherlands) Nicky Catsburg	1
(Portugal) Algarve Pro Racing	Ligier JS P2	Nissan VK45DE 4.5 L V8	P2	25	(Italy) Andrea Roda	2–4
(Portugal) Algarve Pro Racing	Ligier JS P2	Nissan VK45DE 4.5 L V8	P2	25	(United States) Matt McMurry	3
(Portugal) Algarve Pro Racing	Ligier JS P2	Nissan VK45DE 4.5 L V8	P2	25	(Australia) Aidan Read	4
(China) Jackie Chan DC Racing	Oreca 03R	Nissan VK45DE 4.5 L V8	P2	35	(United States) Gustavo Menezes	All
(China) Jackie Chan DC Racing	Oreca 03R	Nissan VK45DE 4.5 L V8	P2	35	(China) Ho-Pin Tung	All
(China) Jackie Chan DC Racing	Oreca 03R	Nissan VK45DE 4.5 L V8	P2	35	(France) Thomas Laurent	2–4

Icon	Class
P2	LMP2

=== LMP3 ===
Entrant/Team	Car	Engine	Class	No.	Drivers	Rounds
(China) Jackie Chan DC Racing	Ligier JS P3	Nissan VK50VE 5.0 L V8	P3	1	(China) David Cheng	All
(China) Jackie Chan DC Racing	Ligier JS P3	Nissan VK50VE 5.0 L V8	P3	1	(United Kingdom) James Winslow	All
(China) Jackie Chan DC Racing	Ligier JS P3	Nissan VK50VE 5.0 L V8	P3	1	(China) Pu Jun Jin	1
(China) Jackie Chan DC Racing	Ligier JS P3	Nissan VK50VE 5.0 L V8	P3	1	(Japan) Hiroki Yoshida	2–4
(Slovakia) ARC Bratislava	Ginetta-Juno LMP3	Nissan VK50VE 5.0 L V8	P3	4	(United Kingdom) Darren Burke	All
(Slovakia) ARC Bratislava	Ginetta-Juno LMP3	Nissan VK50VE 5.0 L V8	P3	4	(Slovakia) Miroslav Konôpka	1–3
(Slovakia) ARC Bratislava	Ginetta-Juno LMP3	Nissan VK50VE 5.0 L V8	P3	4	(United Kingdom) Mike Simpson	1–3
(Slovakia) ARC Bratislava	Ginetta-Juno LMP3	Nissan VK50VE 5.0 L V8	P3	4	(Latvia) Konstantīns Calko	4
(Slovakia) ARC Bratislava	Ginetta-Juno LMP3	Nissan VK50VE 5.0 L V8	P3	7	(Australia) Neale Muston	All
(Slovakia) ARC Bratislava	Ginetta-Juno LMP3	Nissan VK50VE 5.0 L V8	P3	7	(Latvia) Konstantīns Calko	1–3
(Slovakia) ARC Bratislava	Ginetta-Juno LMP3	Nissan VK50VE 5.0 L V8	P3	7	(Slovakia) Miroslav Konôpka	4
(Slovakia) ARC Bratislava	Ginetta-Juno LMP3	Nissan VK50VE 5.0 L V8	P3	7	(United Kingdom) Mike Simpson	4
(United Kingdom) Tockwith Motorsports	Ligier JS P3	Nissan VK50VE 5.0 L V8	P3	26	(United Kingdom) Phil Hanson	All
(United Kingdom) Tockwith Motorsports	Ligier JS P3	Nissan VK50VE 5.0 L V8	P3	26	(United Kingdom) Nigel Moore	All
(Finland) PS Racing	ADESS-03	Nissan VK50VE 5.0 L V8	P3	48	(Italy) Angelo Negro	1–2
(Finland) PS Racing	ADESS-03	Nissan VK50VE 5.0 L V8	P3	48	(Italy) Louis Prette	1–2
(Finland) PS Racing	ADESS-03	Nissan VK50VE 5.0 L V8	P3	48	(Italy) Philippe Prette	1–2
(Philippines) PRT Racing	Ginetta-Juno LMP3	Nissan VK50VE 5.0 L V8	P3	67	(Netherlands) Ate de Jong	All
(Philippines) PRT Racing	Ginetta-Juno LMP3	Nissan VK50VE 5.0 L V8	P3	67	(United Kingdom) Charlie Robertson	All
(Philippines) PRT Racing	Ginetta-Juno LMP3	Nissan VK50VE 5.0 L V8	P3	67	(Estonia) Martin Rump	1–2
(Malaysia) Aylezo Ecotint Racing	Ginetta-Juno LMP3	Nissan VK50VE 5.0 L V8	P3	69	(Malaysia) Zen Low	All
(Malaysia) Aylezo Ecotint Racing	Ginetta-Juno LMP3	Nissan VK50VE 5.0 L V8	P3	69	(Malaysia) Weiron Tan	All
(Malaysia) Aylezo Ecotint Racing	Ginetta-Juno LMP3	Nissan VK50VE 5.0 L V8	P3	69	(Italy) Giacomo Barri	1
(Malaysia) Aylezo Ecotint Racing	Ginetta-Juno LMP3	Nissan VK50VE 5.0 L V8	P3	69	(United Kingdom) Riki Christodoulou	2–4
(Chinese Taipei) G-Print by Triple 1 Racing	Ligier JS P3	Nissan VK50VE 5.0 L V8	P3	85	(Chinese Taipei) Hanss Lin	All
(Chinese Taipei) G-Print by Triple 1 Racing	Ligier JS P3	Nissan VK50VE 5.0 L V8	P3	85	(Colombia) Julio Acosta	1
(Chinese Taipei) G-Print by Triple 1 Racing	Ligier JS P3	Nissan VK50VE 5.0 L V8	P3	85	(Hong Kong) Shaun Thong	2–4
(Chinese Taipei) G-Print by Triple 1 Racing	Ligier JS P3	Nissan VK50VE 5.0 L V8	P3	85	(Japan) Ryuichirou Ohtsuka	3
(Chinese Taipei) FIST-Team AAI	ADESS-03	Nissan VK50VE 5.0 L V8	P3	93	(Chinese Taipei) Huang Chi	4
(Chinese Taipei) FIST-Team AAI	ADESS-03	Nissan VK50VE 5.0 L V8	P3	93	(Japan) Ryohei Sakaguchi	4
(Chinese Taipei) FIST-Team AAI	ADESS-03	Nissan VK50VE 5.0 L V8	P3	93	(Japan) Tatsuya Tanigawa	4
(Hong Kong) Wineurasia	Ligier JS P3	Nissan VK50VE 5.0 L V8	P3	99	(Hong Kong) William Lok	All
(Hong Kong) Wineurasia	Ligier JS P3	Nissan VK50VE 5.0 L V8	P3	99	(United Kingdom) Richard Bradley	1
(Hong Kong) Wineurasia	Ligier JS P3	Nissan VK50VE 5.0 L V8	P3	99	(France) Philippe Descombes	1
(Hong Kong) Wineurasia	Ligier JS P3	Nissan VK50VE 5.0 L V8	P3	99	(Australia) Scott Andrews	2–4
(Hong Kong) Wineurasia	Ligier JS P3	Nissan VK50VE 5.0 L V8	P3	99	(Australia) Aidan Read	2–3
(Hong Kong) Wineurasia	Ligier JS P3	Nissan VK50VE 5.0 L V8	P3	99	(United Kingdom) Devon Modell	4

Icon	Class
P3	LMP3

=== CN ===
Entrant/Team	Car	Engine	Class	No.	Drivers	Rounds
(Finland) PS Racing	Ligier JS53	Honda K20A 2.0 L I4	CN	68	(Japan) Kenji Abe	1
(Finland) PS Racing	Ligier JS53	Honda K20A 2.0 L I4	CN	68	(Japan) Akihiro Asai	1
(Finland) PS Racing	Ligier JS53	Honda K20A 2.0 L I4	CN	68	(China) Qin Tianqi	1
(Finland) PS Racing	Ligier JS53	Honda K20A 2.0 L I4	CN	68	(Thailand) Tira Sosothikul	3
(Finland) PS Racing	Ligier JS53	Honda K20A 2.0 L I4	CN	68	(Thailand) Medhapan Sundaradeja	3

Icon	Class
CN	CN

=== GT ===
Entrant/Team	Car	Engine	Class	No.	Drivers	Rounds
(China) / Absolute Racing (Note: 1. 2 entered as Absolute Racing and #88 entered as Team Bentley Absolute.); (China) / Team Bentley Absolute	Audi R8 LMS	Audi DAR 5.2 L V10	GT	2	(China) Cheng Congfu	1
(China) / Absolute Racing; (China) / Team Bentley Absolute	Audi R8 LMS	Audi DAR 5.2 L V10	GT	2	(China) Steven Lin	1
(China) / Absolute Racing; (China) / Team Bentley Absolute	Audi R8 LMS	Audi DAR 5.2 L V10	GT	2	(Belgium) Alessio Picariello	1
(China) / Absolute Racing; (China) / Team Bentley Absolute	Bentley Continental GT3	Bentley EA824 4.0 L Turbo V8	GT	88	(Hong Kong) Adderly Fong	1
(China) / Absolute Racing; (China) / Team Bentley Absolute	Bentley Continental GT3	Bentley EA824 4.0 L Turbo V8	GT	88	(Chinese Taipei) Jeffrey Lee	1
(China) / Absolute Racing; (China) / Team Bentley Absolute	Bentley Continental GT3	Bentley EA824 4.0 L Turbo V8	GT	88	(Hong Kong) Vincent Wong	1
(Hong Kong) DH Racing	Ferrari 488 GT3	Ferrari F154CB 3.9 L Turbo V8	GT	3	(Monaco) Olivier Beretta	All
(Hong Kong) DH Racing	Ferrari 488 GT3	Ferrari F154CB 3.9 L Turbo V8	GT	3	(Italy) Rino Mastronardi	All
(Hong Kong) DH Racing	Ferrari 488 GT3	Ferrari F154CB 3.9 L Turbo V8	GT	3	(Spain) Alex Riberas	All
(Hong Kong) DH Racing	Ferrari 488 GT3	Ferrari F154CB 3.9 L Turbo V8	GT	5	(Italy) Michele Rugolo	All
(Hong Kong) DH Racing	Ferrari 488 GT3	Ferrari F154CB 3.9 L Turbo V8	GT	5	(Belgium) Frédéric Vervisch	1
(Hong Kong) DH Racing	Ferrari 488 GT3	Ferrari F154CB 3.9 L Turbo V8	GT	5	(China) Neric Wei	1
(Hong Kong) DH Racing	Ferrari 488 GT3	Ferrari F154CB 3.9 L Turbo V8	GT	5	(Belgium) Stéphane Lémeret	2–4
(Hong Kong) DH Racing	Ferrari 488 GT3	Ferrari F154CB 3.9 L Turbo V8	GT	5	(France) Matthieu Vaxivière	2–4
(Italy) VS Racing	Lamborghini Huracán GT3	Lamborghini DGF 5.2 L V10	GT	6	(Italy) Kei Cozzolino	1–3
(Italy) VS Racing	Lamborghini Huracán GT3	Lamborghini DGF 5.2 L V10	GT	6	(United States) Corey Lewis	1–3
(Italy) VS Racing	Lamborghini Huracán GT3	Lamborghini DGF 5.2 L V10	GT	6	(South Africa) Adrian Zaugg	1
(Italy) VS Racing	Lamborghini Huracán GT3	Lamborghini DGF 5.2 L V10	GT	6	(Japan) Yuhi Sekiguchi	2–3
(China) FFF Racing by ACM	Lamborghini Huracán GT3	Lamborghini DGF 5.2 L V10	GT	10	(United Kingdom) Matthew Bell	1–3
(China) FFF Racing by ACM	Lamborghini Huracán GT3	Lamborghini DGF 5.2 L V10	GT	10	(Japan) Hiroshi Hamaguchi	1–3
(China) FFF Racing by ACM	Lamborghini Huracán GT3	Lamborghini DGF 5.2 L V10	GT	10	(Italy) Andrea Caldarelli	1–2
(China) FFF Racing by ACM	Lamborghini Huracán GT3	Lamborghini DGF 5.2 L V10	GT	10	(Italy) Vitantonio Liuzzi	3
(South Korea) Team Audi Korea	Audi R8 LMS	Audi DAR 5.2 L V10	GT	31	(South Korea) You Kyong-Ouk	2–4
(South Korea) Team Audi Korea	Audi R8 LMS	Audi DAR 5.2 L V10	GT	31	(Hong Kong) Marchy Lee	2–4
(South Korea) Team Audi Korea	Audi R8 LMS	Audi DAR 5.2 L V10	GT	31	(Malaysia) Alex Yoong	2–4
(China) Team BBT	Ferrari 488 GT3	Ferrari F154CB 3.9 L Turbo V8	GT	37	(China) Anthony Liu	All
(China) Team BBT	Ferrari 488 GT3	Ferrari F154CB 3.9 L Turbo V8	GT	37	(Italy) Alessandro Pier Guidi	All
(China) Team BBT	Ferrari 488 GT3	Ferrari F154CB 3.9 L Turbo V8	GT	37	(Italy) Davide Rizzo	All
(Switzerland) Spirit of Race	Ferrari 488 GT3	Ferrari F154CB 3.9 L Turbo V8	GT	38	(Portugal) Rui Águas	All
(Switzerland) Spirit of Race	Ferrari 488 GT3	Ferrari F154CB 3.9 L Turbo V8	GT	38	(Italy) Marco Cioci	All
(Switzerland) Spirit of Race	Ferrari 488 GT3	Ferrari F154CB 3.9 L Turbo V8	GT	38	(Singapore) Nasrat Muzayyin	All
(Hong Kong) KCMG	Audi R8 LMS	Audi DAR 5.2 L V10	GT	51	(Japan) Go Max	All
(Hong Kong) KCMG	Audi R8 LMS	Audi DAR 5.2 L V10	GT	51	(Japan) Tetsuya Tanaka	All
(Hong Kong) KCMG	Audi R8 LMS	Audi DAR 5.2 L V10	GT	51	(Japan) Toru Tanaka	All
(Singapore) Clearwater Racing	Ferrari 488 GT3	Ferrari F154CB 3.9 L Turbo V8	GT	61	(Republic of Ireland) Matt Griffin	All
(Singapore) Clearwater Racing	Ferrari 488 GT3	Ferrari F154CB 3.9 L Turbo V8	GT	61	(Japan) Keita Sawa	All
(Singapore) Clearwater Racing	Ferrari 488 GT3	Ferrari F154CB 3.9 L Turbo V8	GT	61	(Singapore) Weng Sun Mok	All
(China) TianShi Racing Team	Audi R8 LMS ultra	Audi DAR 5.2 L V10	GT	66	(Germany) Christopher Haase	1
(China) TianShi Racing Team	Audi R8 LMS ultra	Audi DAR 5.2 L V10	GT	66	(China) Peng Liu	1
(China) TianShi Racing Team	Audi R8 LMS ultra	Audi DAR 5.2 L V10	GT	66	(Italy) Max Wiser	1
(New Zealand) Team NZ	Porsche 911 GT3 Cup	Porsche 4.0 L Flat-6	GTC	77	(Republic of Ireland) John Curran	3–4
(New Zealand) Team NZ	Porsche 911 GT3 Cup	Porsche 4.0 L Flat-6	GTC	77	(New Zealand) Graeme Dowsett	3–4
(New Zealand) Team NZ	Porsche 911 GT3 Cup	Porsche 4.0 L Flat-6	GTC	77	(Thailand) Paul Kanjanapas	3
(New Zealand) Team NZ	Porsche 911 GT3 Cup	Porsche 4.0 L Flat-6	GTC	77	(New Zealand) Will Bamber	4
(Malaysia) OD Racing Best Leader Team	McLaren 650S GT3	McLaren M838T 3.8 L Turbo V8	GT	86	(Malaysia) Fairuz Fauzy	All
(Malaysia) OD Racing Best Leader Team	McLaren 650S GT3	McLaren M838T 3.8 L Turbo V8	GT	86	(New Zealand) Jono Lester	All
(Malaysia) OD Racing Best Leader Team	McLaren 650S GT3	McLaren M838T 3.8 L Turbo V8	GT	86	(China) James Tang	1
(Malaysia) OD Racing Best Leader Team	McLaren 650S GT3	McLaren M838T 3.8 L Turbo V8	GT	86	(France) Philippe Descombes	2
(Malaysia) OD Racing Best Leader Team	McLaren 650S GT3	McLaren M838T 3.8 L Turbo V8	GT	86	(Australia) Liam Talbot	3–4
(Chinese Taipei) FIST-Team AAI (Note: Car No. 91 entered with a McLaren 650S GT3 in Round 1.)	BMW M6 GT3	BMW S63 4.4 L Turbo V8	GT	90	(United Kingdom) Tom Blomqvist	All
(Chinese Taipei) FIST-Team AAI	BMW M6 GT3	BMW S63 4.4 L Turbo V8	GT	90	(Japan) Akira Iida	All
(Chinese Taipei) FIST-Team AAI	BMW M6 GT3	BMW S63 4.4 L Turbo V8	GT	90	(China) Lam Yu	1–2, 4
(Chinese Taipei) FIST-Team AAI	BMW M6 GT3	BMW S63 4.4 L Turbo V8	GT	90	(Finland) Jesse Krohn	3
(Chinese Taipei) FIST-Team AAI	BMW M6 GT3	BMW S63 4.4 L Turbo V8	GT	91	(Chinese Taipei) Jun-San Chen	All
(Chinese Taipei) FIST-Team AAI	BMW M6 GT3	BMW S63 4.4 L Turbo V8	GT	91	(United Kingdom) Ollie Millroy	All
(Chinese Taipei) FIST-Team AAI	BMW M6 GT3	BMW S63 4.4 L Turbo V8	GT	91	(Netherlands) Xavier Maassen	1
(Chinese Taipei) FIST-Team AAI	BMW M6 GT3	BMW S63 4.4 L Turbo V8	GT	91	(Austria) Philipp Eng	2–4
(Chinese Taipei) FIST-Team AAI	Mercedes-AMG GT3	Mercedes-AMG M159 6.2 L V8	GT	92	(China) Li Bin	1–2
(Chinese Taipei) FIST-Team AAI	Mercedes-AMG GT3	Mercedes-AMG M159 6.2 L V8	GT	92	(Japan) Tatsuya Tanigawa	1–2
(Chinese Taipei) FIST-Team AAI	Mercedes-AMG GT3	Mercedes-AMG M159 6.2 L V8	GT	92	(Chinese Taipei) Huang Chi	1
(Chinese Taipei) FIST-Team AAI	Mercedes-AMG GT3	Mercedes-AMG M159 6.2 L V8	GT	92	(China) Wen He Zhang	2
(Japan) TKS	Porsche 911 GT3 Cup	Porsche 4.0 L Flat-6	GTC	96	(Japan) Takuma Aoki	2, 4
(Japan) TKS	Porsche 911 GT3 Cup	Porsche 4.0 L Flat-6	GTC	96	(Japan) Shinyo Sano	2, 4
(Japan) TKS	Porsche 911 GT3 Cup	Porsche 4.0 L Flat-6	GTC	96	(Japan) Shigeto Nagashima	2
(Japan) TKS	Porsche 911 GT3 Cup	Porsche 4.0 L Flat-6	GTC	96	(Japan) Takuya Shirasaka	4

Icon	Class
GT	GT3
GTC	GT Cup

== Results ==
Bold indicates overall winner.

Rnd.	Circuit	LMP2 Winning Team	LMP3 Winning Team	CN Winning Team	GT Winning Team	GT Cup Winning Team	Results
Rnd.	Circuit	LMP2 Winning Drivers	LMP3 Winning Drivers	CN Winning Drivers	GT Winning Drivers	GT Cup Winning Drivers	Results
1	Zhuhai	**(China) No. 35 Jackie Chan DC Racing**	(China) No. 1 Jackie Chan DC Racing	No finishers	(Switzerland) No. 38 Spirit of Race	No entries	Report
1	Zhuhai	**(United States) Gustavo Menezes** **(China) Ho-Pin Tung**	(China) David Cheng (China) Pu Jun Jin (United Kingdom) James Winslow	No finishers	(Portugal) Rui Águas (Italy) Marco Cioci (Singapore) Nasrat Muzayyin	No entries	Report
2	Fuji	**(Switzerland) No. 8 Race Performance**	(United Kingdom) No. 26 Tockwith Motorsports	No entries	(Hong Kong) No. 5 DH Racing	(Japan) No. 96 TKS	Report
2	Fuji	(Switzerland) **Giorgio Maggi** **(United Kingdom) Struan Moore** **(Germany) Fabian Schiller**	(United Kingdom) Philip Hanson (United Kingdom) Nigel Moore	No entries	(Belgium) Stéphane Lémeret (Italy) Michele Rugolo (France) Matthieu Vaxivière	(Japan) Takuma Aoki (Japan) Shigeto Nagashima (Japan) Shinyo Sano	Report
3	Buriram	**(China) No. 35 Jackie Chan DC Racing**	(Slovakia) No. 4 ARC Bratislava	No finishers	(Hong Kong) No. 3 DH Racing	(New Zealand) No. 77 Team NZ	Report
3	Buriram	**(France) Thomas Laurent** **(United States) Gustavo Menezes** **(China) Ho-Pin Tung**	(United Kingdom) Darren Burke (Slovakia) Miroslav Konôpka (United Kingdom) Mike Simpson	No finishers	(Monaco) Olivier Beretta (Italy) Rino Mastronardi (Spain) Alex Riberas	(Republic of Ireland) John Curran (New Zealand) Graeme Dowsett (Thailand) Paul Kanjanapas	Report
4	Sepang	**(Portugal) No. 25 Algarve Pro Racing**	(United Kingdom) No. 26 Tockwith Motorsports	No entries	(South Korea) No. 31 Team Audi Korea	(Japan) No. 96 TKS	Report
4	Sepang	**(France) Andrea Pizzitola** **(Australia) Aidan Read** **(Italy) Andrea Roda**	(United Kingdom) Philip Hanson (United Kingdom) Nigel Moore	No entries	(South Korea) You Kyong-Ouk (Hong Kong) Marchy Lee (Malaysia) Alex Yoong	(Japan) Takuma Aoki (Japan) Shinyo Sano (Japan) Takuya Shirasaka	Report

== Championship Standings ==
Championship Race points

Position	1st	2nd	3rd	4th	5th	6th	7th	8th	9th	10th	Other Classified
Points	25	18	15	12	10	8	6	4	2	1	0.5

== Teams Championships ==
=== LMP2 Teams Championship ===
Pos.	Team	Car	ZHU (China)	FUJ (Japan)	BUR (Thailand)	SEP (Malaysia)	Total
1	(Portugal) #25 Algarve Pro Racing	Ligier JS P2	**3**	**3**	2	**1**	76
2	(China) #35 Jackie Chan DC Racing	Oreca 03R	1	2	**1**	Ret	69
3	(Portugal) #24 Algarve Pro Racing	Ligier JS P2	2	4	3	3	60
4	(Switzerland) #8 Race Performance	Oreca 03R	Ret	1	4	2	55

Key
Colour	Result
Gold	Race winner
Silver	2nd place
Bronze	3rd place
Green	Points finish
Blue	Non-points finish
Blue	Non-classified finish (NC)
Purple	Did not finish (Ret)
Black	Disqualified (DSQ)
Black	Excluded (EX)
White	Did not start (DNS)
White	Race cancelled (C)
White	Withdrew (WD)
Blank	Did not participate

**Bold** – Pole

=== LMP3 Teams Championship ===
Pos.	Team	Car	ZHU (China)	FUJ (Japan)	BUR (Thailand)	SEP (Malaysia)	Total
1	(United Kingdom) #26 Tockwith Motorsports	Ligier JS P3	2	**1**	**7**	**1**	77
2	(Slovakia) #4 ARC Bratislava	Ginetta-Juno LMP3	4	2	1	6	63
3	(China) #1 Jackie Chan DC Racing	Ligier JS P3	1	3	6	3	63
4	(Chinese Taipei) #85 G-Print by Triple 1 Racing	Ligier JS P3	3	Ret	3	2	48
5	(Slovakia) #7 ARC Bratislava	Ginetta-Juno LMP3	5	4	2	7	46
6	(Hong Kong) #99 Wineurasia	Ligier JS P3	**6**	Ret	5	5	29
7	(Malaysia) #69 Aylezo Ecotint Racing	Ginetta-Juno LMP3	DNC	6	8	4	24
8	(Philippines) #67 PRT Racing	Ginetta-Juno LMP3	Ret	5	4	Ret	22
9	(Finland) #48 PS Racing	ADESS-03	7	Ret			6
10	(Chinese Taipei) #93 FIST-Team AAI	ADESS-03				Ret	0

Key
Colour	Result
Gold	Race winner
Silver	2nd place
Bronze	3rd place
Green	Points finish
Blue	Non-points finish
Blue	Non-classified finish (NC)
Purple	Did not finish (Ret)
Black	Disqualified (DSQ)
Black	Excluded (EX)
White	Did not start (DNS)
White	Race cancelled (C)
White	Withdrew (WD)
Blank	Did not participate

**Bold** – Pole

=== CN Teams Championship ===
Pos.	Team	Car	ZHU (China)	FUJ (Japan)	BUR (Thailand)	SEP (Malaysia)	Total
1	(Finland) #68 PS Racing	Ligier JS53	**Ret**		**Ret**		2

Key
Colour	Result
Gold	Race winner
Silver	2nd place
Bronze	3rd place
Green	Points finish
Blue	Non-points finish
Blue	Non-classified finish (NC)
Purple	Did not finish (Ret)
Black	Disqualified (DSQ)
Black	Excluded (EX)
White	Did not start (DNS)
White	Race cancelled (C)
White	Withdrew (WD)
Blank	Did not participate

**Bold** – Pole

=== GT Teams Championship ===
Pos.	Team	Car	ZHU (China)	FUJ (Japan)	BUR (Thailand)	SEP (Malaysia)	Total
1	(Hong Kong) #5 DH Racing	Ferrari 488 GT3	4	1	3	5	62
2	(Hong Kong) #3 DH Racing	Ferrari 488 GT3	Ret	5	1	**2**	54
3	(China) #37 Team BBT	Ferrari 488 GT3	DNS	**2**	**2**	3	53
4	(Singapore) #61 Clearwater Racing	Ferrari 488 GT3	2	7	6	4	44
5	(South Korea) #31 Team Audi Korea	Audi R8 LMS		6	9	1	35
6	(Switzerland) #38 Spirit of Race	Ferrari 488 GT3	**1**	Ret	8	8	34
7	(Chinese Taipei) #91 FIST-Team AAI	McLaren 650S GT3; BMW M6 GT3	Ret	3	5	7	31
8	(Italy) #6 VS Racing	Lamborghini Huracán GT3	3	4	Ret		27
9	(Chinese Taipei) #90 FIST-Team AAI	BMW M6 GT3	Ret	DNS	4	6	20
10	(Hong Kong) #51 KCMG	Audi R8 LMS	6	9	10	9	13
11	(China) #2 Absolute Racing	Audi R8 LMS	5				10
12	(China) #10 FFF Racing by ACM	Lamborghini Huracán GT3	Ret	11	7		6.5
13	(China) #88 Team Bentley Absolute	Bentley Continental GT3	7				6
14	(Malaysia) #86 OD Racing Best Leader Team	McLaren 650S GT3	DNC	8	Ret	10	5
15	(Chinese Taipei) #92 FIST-Team AAI	BMW M6 GT3	Ret	10			1
16	(China) #66 TianShi Racing Team	Audi R8 LMS ultra	Ret				0

Key
Colour	Result
Gold	Race winner
Silver	2nd place
Bronze	3rd place
Green	Points finish
Blue	Non-points finish
Blue	Non-classified finish (NC)
Purple	Did not finish (Ret)
Black	Disqualified (DSQ)
Black	Excluded (EX)
White	Did not start (DNS)
White	Race cancelled (C)
White	Withdrew (WD)
Blank	Did not participate

**Bold** – Pole

=== GT Cup Teams Championship ===
Pos.	Team	Car	ZHU (China)	FUJ (Japan)	BUR (Thailand)	SEP (Malaysia)	Total
1	(Japan) #96 TKS	Porsche 911 GT3 Cup		**1**		**1**	52
2	(New Zealand) #77 Team NZ	Porsche 911 GT3 Cup			**1**	2	44

Key
Colour	Result
Gold	Race winner
Silver	2nd place
Bronze	3rd place
Green	Points finish
Blue	Non-points finish
Blue	Non-classified finish (NC)
Purple	Did not finish (Ret)
Black	Disqualified (DSQ)
Black	Excluded (EX)
White	Did not start (DNS)
White	Race cancelled (C)
White	Withdrew (WD)
Blank	Did not participate

**Bold** – Pole

== Drivers Championships ==
=== LMP2 Drivers Championship ===
Pos.	Driver	Team	ZHU (China)	FUJ (Japan)	BUR (Thailand)	SEP (Malaysia)	Total
1	(Italy) Andrea Roda	(Portugal) Algarve Pro Racing	2	**3**	2	**1**	78
2	(France) Andrea Pizzitola	(Portugal) Algarve Pro Racing	**3**	**3**	2	**1**	76
3	(China) Ho-Pin Tung	(China) Jackie Chan DC Racing	1	2	**1**	Ret	69
3	(United States) Gustavo Menezes	(China) Jackie Chan DC Racing	1	2	**1**	Ret	69
4	(United Kingdom) Michael Munemann	(Portugal) Algarve Pro Racing	**3**	**3**	3	3	62
5	(South Korea) Tacksung Kim	(Portugal) Algarve Pro Racing	2	4	3	3	62
6	(Switzerland) Giorgio Maggi	(Switzerland) Race Performance	Ret	1	4	2	55
6	(Germany) Fabian Schiller	(Switzerland) Race Performance		1	4	2	55
6	(United Kingdom) Struan Moore	(Switzerland) Race Performance		1	4	2	55
7	(France) Thomas Laurent	(China) Jackie Chan DC Racing		2	**1**	Ret	44
8	(United States) Mark Patterson	(Portugal) Algarve Pro Racing		4	3	3	42
9	(United States) Matt McMurry	(Portugal) Algarve Pro Racing	2		2		36
10	(Australia) Aidan Read	(Portugal) Algarve Pro Racing				**1**	25
11	(Netherlands) Nicky Catsburg	(Portugal) Algarve Pro Racing	**3**				16
12	(Switzerland) Jonathan Hirschi	(Portugal) Algarve Pro Racing		4			12

Key
Colour	Result
Gold	Race winner
Silver	2nd place
Bronze	3rd place
Green	Points finish
Blue	Non-points finish
Blue	Non-classified finish (NC)
Purple	Did not finish (Ret)
Black	Disqualified (DSQ)
Black	Excluded (EX)
White	Did not start (DNS)
White	Race cancelled (C)
White	Withdrew (WD)
Blank	Did not participate

**Bold** – Pole

=== LMP3 Drivers Championship ===
Pos.	Driver	Team	ZHU (China)	FUJ (Japan)	BUR (Thailand)	SEP (Malaysia)	Total
1	(United Kingdom) Nigel Moore	(United Kingdom) Tockwith Motorsports	2	**1**	**7**	**1**	77
1	(United Kingdom) Philip Hanson	(United Kingdom) Tockwith Motorsports	2	**1**	**7**	**1**	77
2	(United Kingdom) Darren Burke	(Slovakia) ARC Bratislava	4	2	1	6	63
2	(United Kingdom) James Winslow	(China) Jackie Chan DC Racing	1	3	6	3	63
2	(China) David Cheng	(China) Jackie Chan DC Racing	1	3	6	3	63
3	(Slovakia) Miroslav Konôpka	(Slovakia) ARC Bratislava	4	2	1	7	61
3	(United Kingdom) Mike Simpson	(Slovakia) ARC Bratislava	4	2	1	7	61
4	(Latvia) Konstantīns Calko	(Slovakia) ARC Bratislava	5	4	2	6	48
4	(Chinese Taipei) Hanss Lin	(Chinese Taipei) G-Print by Triple 1 Racing	3	7	3	2	48
5	(Australia) Neale Muston	(Slovakia) ARC Bratislava	5	4	2	7	46
6	(Japan) Hiroki Yoshida	(China) Jackie Chan DC Racing		3	6	3	38
7	(Hong Kong) Shaun Thong	(Chinese Taipei) G-Print by Triple 1 Racing		Ret	3	2	33
8	(Hong Kong) William Lok	(Hong Kong) Wineurasia	**6**	Ret	5	5	29
9	(China) Pu Jun Jin	(China) Jackie Chan DC Racing	1				25
10	(Malaysia) Zen Low	(Malaysia) Aylezo Ecotint Racing	DNC	6	8	4	24
10	(Malaysia) Weiron Tan	(Malaysia) Aylezo Ecotint Racing	DNC	6	8	4	24
10	(United Kingdom) Riki Christodoulou	(Malaysia) Aylezo Ecotint Racing	DNC	6	8	4	24
11	(Netherlands) Ate de Jong	(Philippines) PRT Racing	Ret	5	4	Ret	22
11	(United Kingdom) Charlie Robertson	(Philippines) PRT Racing	Ret	5	4	Ret	22
12	(Australia) Scott Andrews	(Hong Kong) Wineurasia		Ret	5	5	20
13	(Colombia) Julio Acosta	(Chinese Taipei) G-Print by Triple 1 Racing	3				15
13	(Japan) Ryuichirou Ohtsuka	(Chinese Taipei) G-Print by Triple 1 Racing			3		15
14	(Estonia) Martin Rump	(Philippines) PRT Racing	Ret	5			10
14	(Australia) Aidan Read	(Hong Kong) Wineurasia		Ret	5		10
14	(United Kingdom) Devon Modell	(Hong Kong) Wineurasia				5	10
15	(United Kingdom) Richard Bradley	(Hong Kong) Wineurasia	**6**				9
15	(France) Philippe Descombes	(Hong Kong) Wineurasia	**6**				9
16	(Italy) Philippe Prette	(Finland) PS Racing	7	Ret			6
16	(Italy) Angelo Negro	(Finland) PS Racing	7	Ret			6
16	(Italy) Louis Prette	(Finland) PS Racing	7	Ret			6
17	(Italy) Giacomo Barri	(Malaysia) Aylezo Ecotint Racing	DNC				0
17	(Chinese Taipei) Huang Chi	(Chinese Taipei) FIST-Team AAI				Ret	0
17	(Japan) Ryohei Sakaguchi	(Chinese Taipei) FIST-Team AAI				Ret	0
17	(Japan) Tatsuya Tanigawa	(Chinese Taipei) FIST-Team AAI				Ret	0

Key
Colour	Result
Gold	Race winner
Silver	2nd place
Bronze	3rd place
Green	Points finish
Blue	Non-points finish
Blue	Non-classified finish (NC)
Purple	Did not finish (Ret)
Black	Disqualified (DSQ)
Black	Excluded (EX)
White	Did not start (DNS)
White	Race cancelled (C)
White	Withdrew (WD)
Blank	Did not participate

**Bold** – Pole

=== CN Drivers Championship ===
Pos.	Driver	Team	ZHU (China)	FUJ (Japan)	BUR (Thailand)	SEP (Malaysia)	Total
1	(Japan) Kenji Abe	(Finland) PS Racing	**Ret**				1
1	(Japan) Akihiro Asai	(Finland) PS Racing	**Ret**				1
1	(China) Qin Tianqi	(Finland) PS Racing	**Ret**				1
1	(Thailand) Tira Sosothikul	(Finland) PS Racing			**Ret**		1
1	(Thailand) Medhapan Sundaradeja	(Finland) PS Racing			**Ret**		1

Key
Colour	Result
Gold	Race winner
Silver	2nd place
Bronze	3rd place
Green	Points finish
Blue	Non-points finish
Blue	Non-classified finish (NC)
Purple	Did not finish (Ret)
Black	Disqualified (DSQ)
Black	Excluded (EX)
White	Did not start (DNS)
White	Race cancelled (C)
White	Withdrew (WD)
Blank	Did not participate

**Bold** – Pole

=== GT Drivers Championship ===
Pos.	Driver	Team	ZHU (China)	FUJ (Japan)	BUR (Thailand)	SEP (Malaysia)	Total
1	(Italy) Michele Rugolo	(Hong Kong) DH Racing	4	1	3	5	62
2	(Italy) Rino Mastronardi	(Hong Kong) DH Racing	Ret	5	1	**2**	54
2	(Spain) Alex Riberas	(Hong Kong) DH Racing	Ret	5	1	**2**	54
2	(Monaco) Olivier Beretta	(Hong Kong) DH Racing	Ret	5	1	**2**	54
3	(China) Anthony Liu	(China) Team BBT	DNS	**2**	**2**	3	53
3	(Italy) Alessandro Pier Guidi	(China) Team BBT	DNS	**2**	**2**	3	53
3	(Italy) Davide Rizzo	(China) Team BBT	DNS	**2**	**2**	3	53
4	(Belgium) Stéphane Lémeret	(Hong Kong) DH Racing		1	3	5	50
4	(France) Matthieu Vaxivière	(Hong Kong) DH Racing		1	3	5	50
5	(Republic of Ireland) Matt Griffin	(Singapore) Clearwater Racing	2	7	6	4	44
5	(Japan) Keita Sawa	(Singapore) Clearwater Racing	2	7	6	4	44
5	(Singapore) Weng Sun Mok	(Singapore) Clearwater Racing	2	7	6	4	44
6	(Malaysia) Alex Yoong	(South Korea) Team Audi Korea		6	9	1	35
6	(South Korea) You Kyong-Ouk	(South Korea) Team Audi Korea		6	9	1	35
6	(Hong Kong) Marchy Lee	(South Korea) Team Audi Korea		6	9	1	35
7	(Portugal) Rui Águas	(Switzerland) Spirit of Race	**1**	Ret	8	8	34
7	(Italy) Marco Cioci	(Switzerland) Spirit of Race	**1**	Ret	8	8	34
7	(Singapore) Nasrat Muzayyin	(Switzerland) Spirit of Race	**1**	Ret	8	8	34
8	(Chinese Taipei) Jun-San Chen	(Chinese Taipei) FIST-Team AAI	Ret	3	5	7	31
8	(United Kingdom) Ollie Millroy	(Chinese Taipei) FIST-Team AAI	Ret	3	5	7	31
8	(Austria) Philipp Eng	(Chinese Taipei) FIST-Team AAI		3	5	7	31
9	(Italy) Kei Cozzolino	(Italy) VS Racing	3	4	Ret		27
9	(United States) Corey Lewis	(Italy) VS Racing	3	4	Ret		27
10	(United Kingdom) Tom Blomqvist	(Chinese Taipei) FIST-Team AAI	Ret	DNS	4	6	20
10	(Japan) Akira Iida	(Chinese Taipei) FIST-Team AAI	Ret	DNS	4	6	20
11	(South Africa) Adrian Zaugg	(Italy) VS Racing	3				15
12	(Japan) Go Max	(Hong Kong) KCMG	6	9	10	9	13
12	(Japan) Tetsuya Tanaka	(Hong Kong) KCMG	6	9	10	9	13
12	(Japan) Toru Tanaka	(Hong Kong) KCMG	6	9	10	9	13
13	(Japan) Yuhi Sekiguchi	(Italy) VS Racing		4	Ret		12
13	(China) Chaoyin Wei	(Hong Kong) DH Racing	4				12
13	(Belgium) Frédéric Vervisch	(Hong Kong) DH Racing	4				12
13	(Finland) Jesse Krohn	(Chinese Taipei) FIST-Team AAI			4		12
14	(China) Cheng Congfu	(China) Absolute Racing	5				10
14	(China) Steven Lin	(China) Absolute Racing	5				10
14	(Belgium) Alessio Picariello	(China) Absolute Racing	5				10
15	(China) Lam Yu	(Chinese Taipei) FIST-Team AAI	Ret	3		7	8
16	(United Kingdom) Matthew Bell	(China) FFF Racing by ACM	Ret	11	7		6.5
16	(Japan) Hiroshi Hamaguchi	(China) FFF Racing by ACM	Ret	11	7		6.5
17	(Hong Kong) Adderly Fong	(China) Team Bentley Absolute	7				6
17	(Chinese Taipei) Jeffrey Lee	(China) Team Bentley Absolute	7				6
17	(Hong Kong) Vincent Wong	(China) Team Bentley Absolute	7				6
17	(Italy) Vitantonio Liuzzi	(China) FFF Racing by ACM			7		6
18	(Malaysia) Fairuz Fauzy	(Malaysia) OD Racing Best Leader Team	DNC	8	Ret	10	5
18	(New Zealand) Jono Lester	(Malaysia) OD Racing Best Leader Team	DNC	8	Ret	10	5
19	(France) Philippe Descombes	(Malaysia) OD Racing Best Leader Team		8			4
20	(China) Wen He Zhang	(Chinese Taipei) FIST-Team AAI		10			1
20	(China) Li Bin	(Chinese Taipei) FIST-Team AAI	Ret	10			1
20	(Japan) Tatsuya Tanigawa	(Chinese Taipei) FIST-Team AAI	Ret	10			1
20	(Australia) Liam Talbot	(Malaysia) OD Racing Best Leader Team			Ret	10	1
21	(Italy) Andrea Caldarelli	(China) FFF Racing by ACM	Ret	11			0.5
22	(Germany) Christopher Haase	(China) TianShi Racing Team	Ret				0
22	(China) Peng Liu	(China) TianShi Racing Team	Ret				0
22	(Italy) Max Wiser	(China) TianShi Racing Team	Ret				0
22	(China) Tang Chi Lun	(Malaysia) OD Racing Best Leader Team	DNC				0
22	(Netherlands) Xavier Maassen	(Chinese Taipei) FIST-Team AAI	Ret				0
22	(Chinese Taipei) Huang Chi	(Chinese Taipei) FIST-Team AAI	Ret				0

Key
Colour	Result
Gold	Race winner
Silver	2nd place
Bronze	3rd place
Green	Points finish
Blue	Non-points finish
Blue	Non-classified finish (NC)
Purple	Did not finish (Ret)
Black	Disqualified (DSQ)
Black	Excluded (EX)
White	Did not start (DNS)
White	Race cancelled (C)
White	Withdrew (WD)
Blank	Did not participate

**Bold** – Pole

=== GT Cup Drivers Championship ===
Pos.	Driver	Team	ZHU (China)	FUJ (Japan)	BUR (Thailand)	SEP (Malaysia)	Total
1	(Japan) Shinyo Sano	(Japan) TKS		**1**		**1**	52
1	(Japan) Takuma Aoki	(Japan) TKS		**1**		**1**	52
2	(New Zealand) Graeme Dowsett	(New Zealand) Team NZ			**1**	2	44
2	(Republic of Ireland) John Curran	(New Zealand) Team NZ			**1**	2	44
3	(Japan) Takuya Shirasaka	(Japan) TKS				**1**	26
3	(Japan) Shigeto Nagashima	(Japan) TKS		**1**			26
3	(Thailand) Paul Kanjanapas	(New Zealand) Team NZ			**1**		26
4	(New Zealand) Will Bamber	(New Zealand) Team NZ				2	18

Key
Colour	Result
Gold	Race winner
Silver	2nd place
Bronze	3rd place
Green	Points finish
Blue	Non-points finish
Blue	Non-classified finish (NC)
Purple	Did not finish (Ret)
Black	Disqualified (DSQ)
Black	Excluded (EX)
White	Did not start (DNS)
White	Race cancelled (C)
White	Withdrew (WD)
Blank	Did not participate

**Bold** – Pole
