= Charlie Robertson (racing driver) =

British racing driver (born 1997)

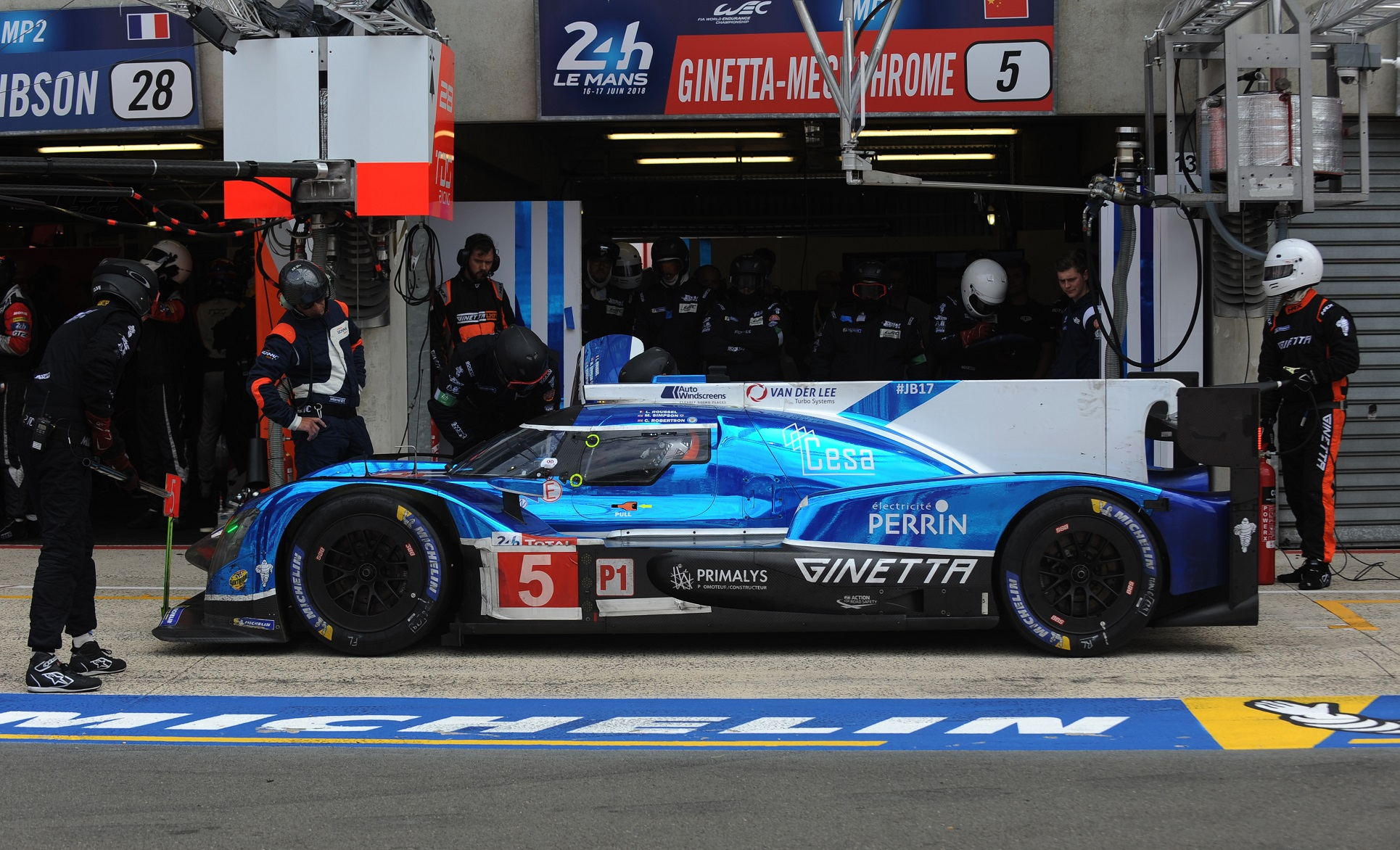
- Robertson driving the Ginetta G60-LT-P1 at the 2018 24 Hours of Le Mans
- Nationality: (United Kingdom) British
- Born: Charles Cameron Robertson; 1 January 1997 (age 29) Caterham, Surrey, England
- Categorisation: FIA Silver (until 2019); FIA Gold (2020–present)

Championship titles
- 2026 2018 2015 2014 2012: GT4 Winter Series – Pro-Am; 24H Proto Series European Championship – P2; ELMS – LMP3; Ginetta GT4 Supercup; Ginetta Junior

Charles Cameron Robertson (born 1 January 1997) is a British racing driver who last competed in the GT4 European Series for Elite Motorsport.

A former Ginetta factory driver, Robertson has won titles in the Ginetta Junior Championship, the Ginetta GT4 Supercup, and the European Le Mans Series' LMP3 class. He also raced in LMP1 in the FIA World Endurance Championship, notably taking the fastest lap at the 2019 4 Hours of Shanghai.

== Early career ==
Charles Cameron Robertson was born on 1 January 1997 in Caterham, Surrey, and attended Caterham School. Robertson began karting at the age of eight, winning the Scottish Open in the Cadet class in 2006 and the Scottish S-plate Championship in 2007. Following two years in the Ginetta Junior Championship where he won the 2012 title, Robertson switched to the BRDC Formula 4 Championship.

In his only season in single-seater competition, Robertson scored his first win at Brands Hatch and took two more wins in the final round at Donington Park to finish third in the standings. At the end of the season, Robertson switched to Ginetta GT4 Supercup, winning the title at season's end with a race to spare.

== Endurance career ==
In 2015, Robertson joined Team LNT to compete in the LMP3 class of the European Le Mans Series alongside Chris Hoy. Robertson won on his series debut at Silverstone, and then took wins at the Red Bull Ring and Le Castellet to take the LMP3 title with a race to spare.

After testing LMP2 machinery at the end of 2015, Robertson stayed in the LMP3 class for 2016, competing in both the Asian Le Mans Sprint Cup and the Asian Le Mans Series for PRT Racing. Winning one race and finishing runner-up in the standings in the former, Robertson only managed a best result of fourth in the latter and finished 11th in points.

In early 2018, it was announced that Robertson would join CEFC TRSM Racing to make his debut in LMP1 machinery in the FIA World Endurance Championship's "super season". After both Ginettas were withdrawn from the season-opener at Spa due to late payments from the team, Robertson raced at the 24 Hours of Le Mans and scored the team's sole point of the season despite being the last classified finisher. With Manor pulling out from Ginetta's LMP1 programme shortly after, Robertson's season effectively came to an end with as disagreements between Ginetta and the ACO meant none of the cars competed in the remaining six races.

Robertson returned to the FIA World Endurance Championship the following year, remaining in LMP1 but joining Team LNT alongside Ben Hanley and Egor Orudzhev. In the opening race of the season, Robertson finished fourth but was classified third points-wise as Rebellion's No. 3 car was entered on a race-by-race basis and thus wasn't eligible for championship points. Robertson finished fifth and took the fastest lap in Shanghai, but after the 8 Hours of Bahrain, both Team LNT's cars withdrew from the 2020 Lone Star Le Mans and subsequently pulled out from the rest of the season.

== GT career ==
In 2017, Robertson joined Ginetta-aligned Century Motorsport alongside Parker Chase to compete in the British GT Championship. Racing just a handful of times in the series, Robertson scored a lone points finish at Silverstone, just after winning both races at Brands Hatch in the GT4 European Series Northern Cup. In 2021, Robertson returned to the British GT Championship, racing in the GT4 class for Assetto Motorsport alongside Mark Sansom. Robertson scored a best result of fourth at the season-opening round at Brands Hatch and finished tenth in the GT4 standings.

After taking a class win at the 6 Hours of Abu Dhabi for Century Motorsport in late 2023, Robertson stayed with them to race a BMW M4 GT4 in the 2024 British GT Championship alongside Ravi Ramyead. The Briton won race one at the Snetterton round and also won at Donington Park to finish sixth in the points at the end of the season. Robertson returned to the British GT Championship and Century Motorsport for 2025. In this third full-time season in GT4, Robertson scored wins at Silverstone, Spa and Snetterton and scored two more podiums to end the year runner-up in the GT4 standings.

In 2026, Robertson and Ramyead joined fellow BMW outfit L'Espace Bienvenue to race in both the GT4 Winter Series and the GT4 European Series. In the five-round Winter Series, the pair scored five class wins and eight other podiums to secure the Pro-Am title. In April, however, their season was put in jeopardy as L'Espace Bienvenue hit financial trouble and withdrew from GT4 Europe. Just a day later, Elite Motorsport entered a third McLaren Artura GT4 to accommodate Robertson. In his first full season in the series, Robertson took class wins at Misano and Algarve, as well as three other class podiums to secure third in Pro-Am.

== Karting record ==
=== Karting career summary ===
| Season | Series | Team | Position |
|---|---|---|---|
| 2007 | British Kart Championship — Cadet | | 31st |
| 2008 | Super One Series — Comer Cadet | | 2nd |
| 2008 | BRDC Stars of Tomorrow — Cadet | | 2nd |
| 2009 | British Open Championship — Mini Max | | 5th |
| 2009 | Formula Kart Series — Mini Max | | 8th |
| 2009 | Kartmasters British GP — Mini Max | | 20th |
| 2010 | Super One Series — KF3 | | 8th |
| 2010 | Formula Kart Series — KF3 | | 2nd |
| 2010 | FIA European Championship — KF3 | Fusion Motorsport | 34th |
| 2010 | Kartmasters British GP — KF3 | | 4th |

== Racing record ==
=== Racing career summary ===
| Season | Series | Team | Races | Wins | Poles | F/Laps | Podiums | Points | Position |
|---|---|---|---|---|---|---|---|---|---|
| 2011 | Ginetta Junior Winter Series | HHC Motorsport | 4 | 2 | 2 | 1 | 2 | 95 | **3rd** |
| 2011 | Ginetta Junior Championship | HHC Motorsport | 20 | 3 | 5 | 5 | 9 | 437 | **2nd** |
| 2012 | Ginetta Junior Championship | HHC Motorsport | 20 | 6 | 12 | 7 | 13 | 507 | **1st** |
| 2013 | BRDC Formula 4 Championship | HHC Motorsport | 24 | 3 | 0 | 7 | 9 | 396 | **3rd** |
| 2014 | Ginetta GT4 Supercup | HHC Motorsport | 27 | 8 | 6 | 7 | 20 | 710 | **1st** |
| 2014 | Challenge Endurance GT/Tourisme V de V | Team LNT | 1 | 0 | 0 | 0 | 0 | 0 | NC |
| 2015 | European Le Mans Series – LMP3 | Team LNT | 5 | 3 | 5 | 5 | 4 | 94 | **1st** |
| 2015 | Silverstone 24 Hours – Class 1 | Team LNT | 1 | 0 | 0 | 0 | 1 | N/A | **2nd** |
| 2016 | Sepang 12 Hours – GT4 | Simpson Motorsport | 1 | 0 | 0 | 1 | 1 | N/A | **3rd** |
| 2016 | Challenge Endurance PFV V de V | CWS Recycling | 7 | 2 | 0 | 2 | 3 | 182.5 | 4th |
| 2016 | Road to Le Mans – LMP3 | Team LNT | 1 | 0 | 0 | 0 | 0 | N/A | 14th |
| 2016 | Asian Le Mans Sprint Cup – LMP3 | PRT Racing | 6 | 1 | 1 | 6 | 4 | 86 | **2nd** |
| 2016–17 | Asian Le Mans Series – LMP3 | PRT Racing | 4 | 0 | 0 | 0 | 0 | 22 | 11th |
| 2017 | British GT Championship – GT3 | Century Motorsport | 3 | 0 | 0 | 0 | 0 | 1.5 | 21st |
| 2017 | GT4 European Series Northern Cup | Ginetta Cars | 2 | 2 | 2 | 2 | 2 | 50 | 14th |
| 2017 | Trans-Am Series – TA3 | Ginetta Cars | 1 | 0 | 1 | 0 | 0 | 0 | NC |
| 2017 | V de V Endurance Series - PFV | Simpson Motorsport; Nova Race | 3 | 1 | 2 | 2 | 2 | 89 | 6th |
| 2018 | 24H Proto Series Championship of the Continents – P2 | Simpson Motorsport | 2 | 1 | 0 | 2 | 2 | 36 | **3rd** |
| 2018 | 24H Proto Series European Championship – P2 | Simpson Motorsport | 1 | 1 | 0 | 0 | 1 | 28 | **1st** |
| 2018–19 | FIA World Endurance Championship – LMP1 | CEFC TRSM Racing | 1 | 0 | 0 | 0 | 0 | 1 | 38th |
| 2019 | VLN Series – V4 | KKrämer Racing | 2 | 0 | 0 | 0 | 0 | 3.13 | 129th |
| 2019 | VLN Series – Cayman GT4 | KKrämer Racing | 1 | 0 | 0 | 0 | 0 | 4.23 | 36th |
| 2019 | 24 Hours of Nürburgring – SP10 | KKrämer Racing powered by REWITEC | 1 | 0 | 0 | 0 | 0 | N/A | 4th |
| 2019–20 | FIA World Endurance Championship – LMP1 | Team LNT | 4 | 0 | 0 | 1 | 1 | 27 | 16th |
| 2021 | Asian Le Mans Series – LMP3 | ARC Bratislava | 4 | 0 | 0 | 0 | 0 | 14 | 10th |
| 2021 | British GT Championship – GT4 | Assetto Motorsport | 9 | 0 | 1 | 1 | 0 | 63 | 10th |
| 2022 | Championnat de France FFSA GT - Pro-Am | Paradine Motorsport | 2 | 0 | 0 | 0 | 0 | 0 | NC |
| 2022 | British GT Championship – GT4 | Assetto Motorsport | 1 | 0 | 0 | 0 | 0 | 0 | NC |
| 2023–24 | Middle East Trophy – GT4 | Century Motorsport | 2 | 1 | 0 | 0 | 2 | 76 | ?? |
| 2024 | British GT Championship – GT4 | Century Motorsport | 8 | 2 | 0 | 0 | 2 | 72.5 | 6th |
| 2024 | 24H Series – GT4 | Simpson Motorsport | 2 | 0 | 0 | 0 | 0 | 24 | 14th |
| 2025 | GT4 Winter Series – Invitational | Century Motorsport | 15 | 14 | 0 | 1 | 15 | 0 | NC† |
| 2025 | British GT Championship – GT4 | Century Motorsport | 8 | 3 | 1 | 0 | 5 | 184 | **2nd** |
| 2026 | GT4 Winter Series – Pro-Am | L'Espace Bienvenue | 15 | 5 | 0 | 0 | 13 | 206 | **1st** |
| 2026 | GT4 European Series – Pro-Am | Elite Motorsport with Entire Racing Engineering | 12 | 2 | 2 | 0 | 5 | 151 | **3rd** |

=== Complete Ginetta Junior Championship results ===
(key) (Races in bold indicate pole position) (Races in italics indicate fastest lap)

| Year | Team | 1 | 2 | 3 | 4 | 5 | 6 | 7 | 8 | 9 | 10 | 11 | 12 | 13 | 14 | 15 | 16 | 17 | 18 | 19 | 20 | DC | Points |
|---|---|---|---|---|---|---|---|---|---|---|---|---|---|---|---|---|---|---|---|---|---|---|---|
| 2011 | HHC Motorsport | BHI; 1; 4 | BHI; 2; 5 | DON; 1; 2 | DON; 2 DSQ | THR; 1; 6 | THR; 2; 10 | OUL; 1; 2 | OUL; 2; 4 | **CRO**; **1**; 2 | **CRO**; **2**; 1 | **SNE**; **1**; 2 | SNE; 2; 4 | KNO; 1; 5 | KNO; 2; 3 | **ROC**; **1**; 8 | **ROC**; **2**; 1 | BHGP; 1; 4 | BHGP; 2; 1 | SIL; 1; 6 | SIL; 2; 3 | 2nd | 437 |
| 2012 | HHC Motorsport | BHI; 1; 12 | **BHI**; **2**; 1 | DON; 1; 2 | DON; 2 Ret | **THR**; **1**; 1 | **THR**; **2**; 1 | **OUL**; **1**; 4 | **OUL**; **2**; 7 | CRO; 1; 3 | CRO; 2; 2 | SNE; 1; 5 | SNE; 2; 1 | **KNO**; **1**; 1 | **KNO**; **2**; 1 | **ROC**; **1**; 2 | **ROC**; **2**; 2 | **SIL**; **1**; 2 | **SIL**; **2** Ret | BHGP; 1; 4 | **BHGP**; **2**; 2 | 1st | 507 |

=== Complete BRDC Formula 4 Championship results ===
(key) (Races in bold indicate pole position) (Races in italics indicate fastest lap)

| Year | Team | 1 | 2 | 3 | 4 | 5 | 6 | 7 | 8 | 9 | 10 | 11 | 12 | 13 | 14 | 15 | 16 | 17 | 18 | 19 | 20 | 21 | 22 | 23 | 24 | DC | Points |
|---|---|---|---|---|---|---|---|---|---|---|---|---|---|---|---|---|---|---|---|---|---|---|---|---|---|---|---|
| 2013 | HHC Motorsport | SIL1; 1; 5 | SIL1; 2; 7 | SIL1; 3; 4 | BRH1; 1; 2 | BRH1; 2; 3 | **BRH1**; **3**; 1 | SNE1; 1; 2 | SNE1; 2; 5 | **SNE1**; **3** DSQ | OUL; 1 Ret | OUL; 2; 14 | **OUL**; **3**; 3 | BRH2; 1; 3 | BRH2; 2; 8 | BRH2; 3 Ret | SIL2; 1; 3 | SIL2; 2; 4 | SIL2; 3; 5 | SNE2; 1; 4 | SNE2; 2; 4 | SNE2; 3; 5 | DON; 1; 4 | DON; 2; 1 | **DON**; **3**; 1 | 3rd | 396 |

=== Complete Ginetta GT4 Supercup results ===
(key) (Races in bold indicate pole position) (Races in italics indicate fastest lap)

| Year | Team | 1 | 2 | 3 | 4 | 5 | 6 | 7 | 8 | 9 | 10 | 11 | 12 | 13 | 14 | 15 | 16 | 17 | 18 | 19 | 20 | 21 | 22 | 23 | 24 | 25 | 26 | 27 | DC | Points |
|---|---|---|---|---|---|---|---|---|---|---|---|---|---|---|---|---|---|---|---|---|---|---|---|---|---|---|---|---|---|---|
| 2014 | HHC Motorsport | BRH; 1; 3 | BRH; 2; 2 | BRH; 3; 11 | **DON**; **1**; 1 | **DON**; **2**; 2 | DON; 3; 9 | **THR**; **1**; 5 | THR; 2; 5 | THR; 3; 10 | **OUL**; **1**; 1 | **OUL**; **2**; 1 | **CRO**; **1**; 2 | CRO; 2; 2 | CRO; 3; 6 | **SNE**; **1**; 1 | **SNE**; **2**; 1 | SNE; 3; 9 | KNO; 1; 2 | KNO; 2; 2 | KNO; 3; 3 | **ROC**; **1**; 1 | **ROC**; **2**; 2 | SIL; 1; 3 | SIL; 2; 3 | BRH; 1; 3 | BRH; 2; 3 | BRH; 3; 1 | 1st | 710 |

=== Complete European Le Mans Series results ===
(key) (Races in bold indicate pole position) (Races in italics indicate fastest lap)

| Year | Entrant | Class | Chassis | Engine | 1 | 2 | 3 | 4 | 5 | Rank | Points |
|---|---|---|---|---|---|---|---|---|---|---|---|
| 2015 | Team LNT | LMP3 | Ginetta-Juno LMP3 | Nissan VK50 5L V8 | **SIL**; 1 | **IMO**; Ret | **RBR**; 1 | **LEC**; 1 | **EST**; 3 | 1st | 93 |

=== 24 Hours of Silverstone results ===
| Year | Team | Co-Drivers | Car | Car No. | Class | Laps | Pos. | Class Pos. |
|---|---|---|---|---|---|---|---|---|
| 2015 | (United Kingdom) Team LNT | (United Kingdom) Lawrence Tomlinson (United Kingdom) Chris Hoy (United Kingdom) Mike Simpson (France) Gaëtan Paletou | Ginetta Juno LMP3 | 12 | 1 | 418 | 13th | 2nd |

=== Complete Asian Le Mans Series results ===
(key) (Races in bold indicate pole position; results in italics indicate fastest lap)

| Year | Team | Class | Car | Engine | 1 | 2 | 3 | 4 | Rank | Pts |
|---|---|---|---|---|---|---|---|---|---|---|
| 2016–17 | PRT Racing | LMP3 | Ginetta-Juno LMP3 | Nissan VK56DE 5.6L V8 | ZHU; Ret | FUJ; 5 | CHA; 4 | SEP; Ret | 11th | 22 |
| 2021 | ARC Bratislava | LMP3 | Ginetta G61-LT-P3 | Nissan VK56DE 5.6L V8 | DUB; 1 Ret | DUB; 2; 8 | ABU; 1; 6 | ABU; 2; 9 | 10th | 14 |

=== Complete FIA World Endurance Championship results ===
(key) (Races in bold indicate pole position; races in italics indicate fastest lap)

| Year | Entrant | Class | Chassis | Engine | 1 | 2 | 3 | 4 | 5 | 6 | 7 | 8 | Rank | Points |
|---|---|---|---|---|---|---|---|---|---|---|---|---|---|---|
| 2018–19 | CEFC TRSM Racing | LMP1 | Ginetta G60-LT-P1 | Mecachrome V634P1 3.4 L Turbo V6 | SPA; WD | LMS; 5 | SIL | FUJ | SHA | SEB | SPA | LMS | 38th | 1 |
| 2019–20 | Team LNT | LMP1 | Ginetta G60-LT-P1 | AER P60C 2.4 L Turbo V6 | SIL; 3 | FUJ; 9 | SHA; 5 | BHR; Ret | COA | SPA | LMS | BHR | 16th | 27 |

=== Complete 24 Hours of Le Mans results ===
| Year | Team | Co-Drivers | Car | Class | Laps | Pos. | Class Pos. |
|---|---|---|---|---|---|---|---|
| 2018 | (China) CEFC TRSM Racing | (France) Léo Roussel (United Kingdom) Mike Simpson | Ginetta G60-LT-P1 | LMP1 | 283 | 41st | 5th |

=== Complete British GT Championship results ===
(key) (Races in bold indicate pole position in class) (Races in italics indicate fastest lap in class)

| Year | Entrant | Chassis | Class | 1 | 2 | 3 | 4 | 5 | 6 | 7 | 8 | 9 | 10 | DC | Pts |
|---|---|---|---|---|---|---|---|---|---|---|---|---|---|---|---|
| 2017 | Century Motorsport | Ginetta G55 GT3 | GT3 | OUL; 1 Ret | OUL; 2 DNS | ROC; 12 | SNE; 1 | SNE; 2 | SIL; 10 | SPA; 1 | SPA; 2 | BRH | DON | 21st | 1.5 |
| 2021 | Assetto Motorsport | Ginetta G56 GT4 | GT4 | BRH; 16 | SIL; 18 | DON1; Ret | SPA; Ret | SNE; 1; 14 | **SNE**; **2** Ret | OUL; 1; 15 | OUL; 2; 16 | DON2; 21 | | 10th | 63 |
| 2022 | Assetto Motorsport | Ginetta G56 GT4 | GT4 | OUL; 1 | OUL; 2 | SIL | DON1 | SNE; 1 | SNE; 2 | SPA | BRH; 18 | DON2 | | NC | 0 |
| 2024 | Century Motorsport | BMW M4 GT4 Gen II | GT4 | OUL; 1; 24 | OUL; 2 Ret | SIL; 31 | DON1; Ret | SPA; WD | SNE; 1; 14 | SNE; 2 Ret | DON2; 13 | BRH | | 6th | 72.5 |
| 2025 | Century Motorsport | BMW M4 GT4 Evo (G82) | GT4 | DON1; 14 | SIL; 17 | OUL; 1 Ret | **OUL**; **2** DNS | SPA; 11 | SNE; 1; 17 | SNE; 2; 13 | BRH; 13 | DON2; 17 | | 2nd | 184 |

=== Complete GT4 European Series results ===
(key) (Races in bold indicate pole position) (Races in italics indicate fastest lap)

| Year | Team | Car | Class | 1 | 2 | 3 | 4 | 5 | 6 | 7 | 8 | 9 | 10 | 11 | 12 | Pos | Points |
|---|---|---|---|---|---|---|---|---|---|---|---|---|---|---|---|---|---|
| 2017 | Ginetta Cars | Ginetta G55 GT4 | Silver | MIS; 1 | MIS; 2 | **BRH**; **1**; 1 | **BRH**; **2**; 1 | RBR; 1 | RBR; 2 | SVK; 1 | SVK; 2 | ZAN; 1 | ZAN; 2 | NÜR; 1 | NÜR; 2 | 14th | 50 |
| 2026 | Elite Motorsport with Entire Race Engineering | McLaren Artura GT4 | Pro-Am | LEC; 1; 24 | LEC; 2; 13 | MNZ; 1; 18 | MNZ; 2; 26 | **SPA**; **1**; 22 | SPA; 2; 10 | **MIS**; **1**; 7 | MIS; 2 Ret | ZAN; 1; 15 | ZAN; 2; 12 | POR; 1; 3 | POR; 2; 12 | 3rd | 151 |
