= Giorgio Maggi =

Swiss racing driver

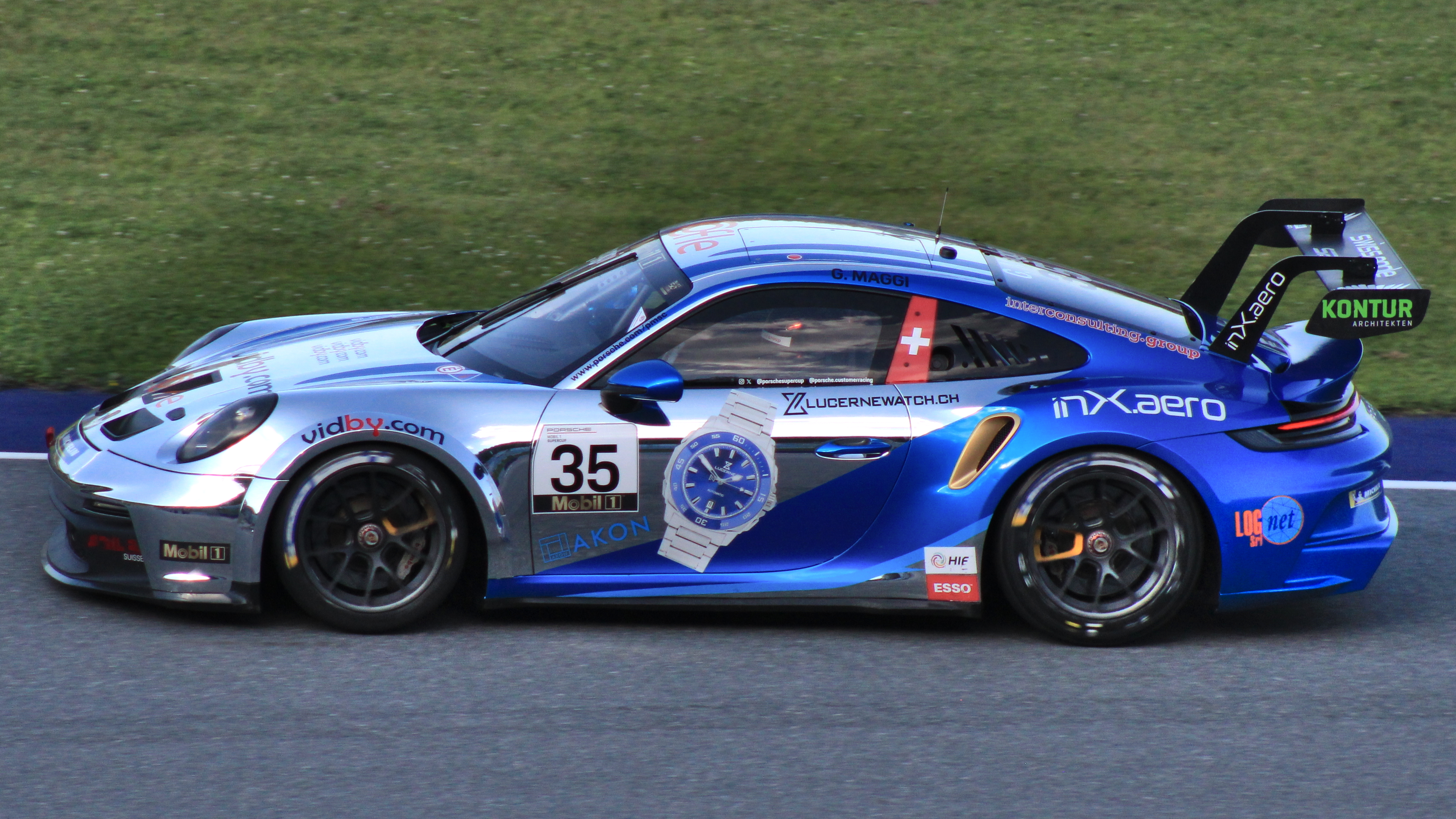
- Maggi at the Red Bull Ring in 2024
- Nationality: (Switzerland) Swiss
- Born: 18 December 1997 (age 28) Hergiswil, Switzerland

NASCAR Whelen Euro Series career
- Debut season: 2019
- Current team: Race Art Technology
- Categorisation: FIA Silver
- Car number: 18
- Engine: Toyota
- Former teams: Hendriks Motorsport
- Starts: 26 (ENPRO), 13 (EN2)
- Wins: 0 (ENPRO), 3 (EN2)
- Podiums: 2 (ENPRO), 8 (EN2)
- Poles: 1 (ENPRO), 6 (EN2)
- Fastest laps: 1 (ENPRO), 5 (EN2)
- Best finish: 2nd in 2019
- Finished last season: 7th in 2021

NASCAR O'Reilly Auto Parts Series career
- 2021 position: 111th
- Best finish: 111th (2021)
Wins	Top tens	Poles
0	0	0

Previous series
- 2019: NASCAR Whelen Euro Series Elite 2
- Statistics up to date as of 28 December 2021.

Giorgio Romero Maggi (born 18 December 1997) is a Swiss professional racing driver. He competes in the NASCAR Whelen Euro Series' EuroNASCAR PRO division, driving the No. 18 Toyota Camry for Race Art Technology. He has also raced in the NASCAR Xfinity Series.

== Career ==
Maggi ran the 2019 season in the Whelen Euro Elite 2 series, finishing second in the standings with three wins. Maggi spent the 2020 season in the NASCAR Whelen Euro Series, finishing 11th in the standings with one podium. Maggi attempted to qualify for his first NASCAR Xfinity Series race, the 2021 Pennzoil 150, but failed to qualify.

In the 2022 season, Maggi switched teams to Race Art Technology to drive the team's No. 18 Toyota Camry in the EuroNASCAR PRO division.

== Racing record ==
=== Career summary ===
Season	Series	Team	Races	Wins	Poles	F/Laps	Podiums	Points	Position
2013	ADAC Formel Masters	ADAC Berlin-Brandenburg e.V.	23	0	0	0	0	0	20th
2014	ADAC Formel Masters	ADAC Berlin-Brandenburg	24	0	0	0	0	10	15th
2014	Legend SuperCup	Team Switzerland	4	0	0	1	3	127	13th
2015	ADAC Formula 4 Championship	SMG Swiss Motorsport	12	0	0	0	0	8	23rd
2015	ADAC Formula 4 Championship	Race Performance	12	0	0	0	0	8	23rd
2015-16	Asian Le Mans Series - CN	Avelon Formula	3	2	1	1	2	51	**1st**
2016	European Le Mans Series - LMP3	Race Performance	6	0	0	0	0	22.5	13th
2016	Road to Le Mans - LMP3	Race Performance	1	0	0	0	0	N/A	10th
2016-17	Asian Le Mans Series - LMP2	Race Performance	4	1	0	0	2	55	6th
2017	Blancpain GT Series Endurance Cup	Attempto Racing	4	0	0	0	0	0	NC
2017	Intercontinental GT Challenge	Attempto Racing	1	0	0	0	0	0	NC
2017	European Le Mans Series - LMP3	By Speed Factory	1	0	0	0	0	0.5	29th
2017	24H Series - A6	Konrad Motorsport							
2018	ADAC GT Masters	Honda Team Schubert Motorsport	14	0	0	0	0	8	34th
2019	NASCAR Whelen Euro Series - Elite 2	Hendriks Motorsport	13	3	5	5	8	564	**2nd**
2020	NASCAR Whelen Euro Series - EuroNASCAR PRO	Hendriks Motorsport	10	0	1	0	1	303	11th
2021	NASCAR Whelen Euro Series - EuroNASCAR PRO	Hendriks Motorsport-MOMO	12	0	0	1	0	357	7th
2021	NASCAR Xfinity Series	MBM Motorsports	0	0	0	0	0	0	NC
2022	NASCAR Whelen Euro Series - EuroNASCAR PRO	Race Art Technology	12	0	1	2	4	357	5th
2023	NASCAR Whelen Euro Series - EuroNASCAR PRO	Race Art Technology	10	0	0	0	1	323	10th
2023	Italian GT Championship - GT Cup	Double TT Racing							
2024	Italian GT Sprint Championship - GT3 Pro-Am	Double TT Racing	0	0	0	0	0	43	5th
2024	Porsche Supercup	SP Racing - Swiss Eagle	2	0	0	0	0	0	NC†
2025	NASCAR Euro Series - PRO	SpeedHouse Racing	11	0	0	0	0	354	16th

=== Complete ADAC Formel Masters/Formula 4 Championship results ===
(key) (Races in bold indicate pole position) (Races in italics indicate fastest lap)

Year	Team	1	2	3	4	5	6	7	8	9	10	11	12	13	14	15	16	17	18	19	20	21	22	23	24	DC	Points
2013	ADAC Berlin-Brandenburg e.V.	OSC; 1; 15	OSC; 2 DNS	OSC; 3; 13	SPA; 1; 16	SPA; 2; 18	SPA; 3; 15	SAC; 1; 17	SAC; 2; 12	SAC; 3; 16	NÜR; 1; 15	NÜR; 2; 16	NÜR; 3; 16	RBR; 1; 16	RBR; 2; 17	RBR; 3; 15	LAU; 1; 18	LAU; 2; 17	LAU; 3; 14	SVK; 1; 13	SVK; 2; 14	SVK; 3; 15	HOC; 1; 19	HOC; 2; 12	HOC; 3; 15	20th	0
2014	ADAC Berlin-Brandenburg	OSC; 1; 10	OSC; 2; 12	OSC; 3; 11	ZAN; 1 Ret	ZAN; 2; 12	ZAN; 3; 9	LAU; 1; 11	LAU; 2; 11	LAU; 3; 13	RBR; 1; 15	RBR; 2; 14	RBR; 3; 12	SVK; 1; 12	SVK; 2; 14	SVK; 3; 11	NÜR; 1; 13	NÜR; 2; 12	NÜR; 3; 11	SAC; 1 Ret	SAC; 2; 9	SAC; 3; 6	HOC; 1; 13	HOC; 2; 14	HOC; 3; 13	15th	10
2015	SMG Swiss Motorsport	OSC; 1; 11	OSC; 2; 7	OSC; 3; 11	RBR; 1; 26	RBR; 2; 25	RBR; 3; 15	SPA; 1; 9	SPA; 2; 17	SPA; 3 Ret	LAU; 1; 11	LAU; 2; 22	LAU; 3 Ret													23rd	8
2015	Race Performance													NÜR; 1; 26	NÜR; 2; 22	NÜR; 3; 26	SAC; 1 Ret	SAC; 2; 17	SAC; 3; 20	OSC; 1; 12	OSC; 2; 19	OSC; 3; 23	HOC; 1; 25	HOC; 2; 20	HOC; 3 Ret	23rd	8

=== NASCAR ===
(key) (Bold – Pole position awarded by qualifying time. Italics – Pole position earned by points standings or practice time. * – Most laps led.)

==== Xfinity Series ====
NASCAR Xfinity Series results
Year	Team	No.	Make	1	2	3	4	5	6	7	8	9	10	11	12	13	14	15	16	17	18	19	20	21	22	23	24	25	26	27	28	29	30	31	32	33	NXSC	Pts	Ref
2021	MBM Motorsports	42	Toyota	DAY	DAY	HOM	LVS	PHO	ATL	MAR	TAL	DAR	DOV	COA	CLT	MOH	TEX	NSH	POC	ROA	ATL	NHA	GLN	IND; DNQ	MCH	DAY	DAR	RCH	BRI	LVS	TAL	CLT	TEX	KAN	MAR	PHO	-	-	

==== Whelen Euro Series – EuroNASCAR PRO ====
(key) (Bold – Pole position. Italics – Fastest lap. * – Most laps led. ^ – Most positions gained)

NASCAR Whelen Euro Series – EuroNASCAR PRO results
Year	Team	No.	Make	1	2	3	4	5	6	7	8	9	10	11	12	NWES	Pts
2020	Hendriks Motorsport	18	Ford	ITA; 15	ITA; 12	BEL; 16	BEL; 18	**CRO**; 2	CRO; 17	ESP1; 8	ESP1; 12	ESP2; 5	ESP2; 19			11th	303
2021	Hendriks Motorsport-MOMO	18	Ford	ESP; 24	ESP; 8	GBR; 8	GBR; 4^	CZE; 7	CZE; 6	CRO; 18	CRO; 23	BEL; 7	BEL; 6	ITA; 6	ITA; 8	7th	357
2022	Race Art Technology	18	Toyota	ESP; 6	ESP; 18	GBR; 5	GBR; 2	ITA; 2	ITA; 2	CZE; 3	CZE; 20	BEL; 6	BEL; 20	CRO; 4	**CRO**; 17*	5th	374
2023	Race Art Technology	18	Toyota	ESP; 10	ESP; 7	GBR; 6	GBR; 15	ITA; 22	ITA; 18	CZE; DNS	CZE; DNS	GER; 19	GER; 8	BEL; 3	BEL; 5	10th	323
2025	SpeedHouse Racing	33	Ford	ESP; 18	ESP; 19	ITA; 16	ITA; 13	GBR; 8	GBR; 8	CZE; 8	CZE; 17	GER; 16	GER; 13	BEL; 14	BEL; DNS	16th	354

^{*} Season still in progress.

==== Whelen Euro Series – Elite 2 ====
(key) (Bold – Pole position. Italics – Fastest lap. * – Most laps led. ^ – Most positions gained)

NASCAR Whelen Euro Series – Elite 2 results
Year	Team	No.	Make	1	2	3	4	5	6	7	8	9	10	11	12	13	NWES	Pts
2019	Hendriks Motorsport	50	Ford	VAL; 1	VAL; 7	FRA; 3	FRA; 4	BRH; 12	BRH; 3	**MOS**; 1*	**MOS**; 2	**VEN**; 5	**HOC**; 1*	**HOC**; 5	**ZOL**; 2	ZOL; 2	2nd	564

^{*} Season still in progress
^{1} Ineligible for series points
