= 2017 V de V Endurance Series =

The 2017 V de V Endurance Series was the third consecutive season for the GT, Touring Car and LMP3 classes of the V de V sanctioned series.

== Entry list ==
=== PFV ===
| Team | Chassis | Engine | No. | Drivers | Round |
|---|---|---|---|---|---|
| R-ace GP | Renault R.S. 01 Trophy | Nismo VR38DETT 3.8L V6 | 28 | (France) Matthieu Vaxivière (France) François Perrodo | 1 |
| DEMJ Team | Renault R.S. 01 Trophy | Nismo VR38DETT 3.8L V6 | 16 | (France) Patrick Sarrailh (Italy) Max Mugelli | 5–7 |
| Pegasus Racing | Ginetta G57 P2 | Chevrolet LS3 6.2L V8 | 29 | (France) Julien Schell | 1–2 |
| Pegasus Racing | Ginetta G57 P2 | Chevrolet LS3 6.2L V8 | 29 | (France) Stéphane Raffin | 1 |
| Pegasus Racing | Ginetta G57 P2 | Chevrolet LS3 6.2L V8 | 29 | (France) David Caussanel | 2 |
| Pegasus Racing | Ginetta G57 P2 | Chevrolet LS3 6.2L V8 | 57 | (United Kingdom) Mike Simpson | 1–2 |
| Pegasus Racing | Ginetta G57 P2 | Chevrolet LS3 6.2L V8 | 57 | (Australia) Neale Muston | 1 |
| Pegasus Racing | Ginetta G57 P2 | Chevrolet LS3 6.2L V8 | 57 | (United Kingdom) Jordan Sanders | 1 |
| Pegasus Racing | Ginetta G57 P2 | Chevrolet LS3 6.2L V8 | 57 | (United Kingdom) Simon Murray | 2 |
| Pegasus Racing | Ginetta G57 P2 | Chevrolet LS3 6.2L V8 | 57 | (United Kingdom) Tom Hibbert | 2 |
| Simpson Motorsport | Ginetta G57 P2 | Chevrolet LS3 6.2L V8 | 50 | (United Kingdom) Charlie Robertson | 1 |
| Simpson Motorsport | Ginetta G57 P2 | Chevrolet LS3 6.2L V8 | 50 | (United Kingdom) Sennan Fielding | 1 |
| Simpson Motorsport | Ginetta G57 P2 | Chevrolet LS3 6.2L V8 | 52 | (United Kingdom) Jordan Sanders | 2 |
| Simpson Motorsport | Ginetta G57 P2 | Chevrolet LS3 6.2L V8 | 52 | (United Kingdom) Sennan Fielding | 2 |
| CWS Recycling | Ginetta G57 P2 | Chevrolet LS3 6.2L V8 | 55 | (United Kingdom) Colin White (United Kingdom) Samuel Allpass (United Kingdom) Adrian Watt | 1 |
| Century Motorsport | Ginetta G57 P2 | Chevrolet LS3 6.2L V8 | 99 | (United Kingdom) Ben Green (Netherlands) Rik Breukers (United Kingdom) Euan McKay | 1 |

=== LMP3 ===
| Team | Chassis | Engine | No. | Drivers | Round |
|---|---|---|---|---|---|
| By Speed Factory | Ligier JS P3 | Nissan VK50VE 5.0L V8 | 5 | (Estonia) Migule Abello Gamazo | 2 |
| By Speed Factory | Ligier JS P3 | Nissan VK50VE 5.0L V8 | 5 | (Estonia) Mirko van Oostrum | 2 |
| By Speed Factory | Ligier JS P3 | Nissan VK50VE 5.0L V8 | 5 | (Spain) Jesus Fuster Pliego | 2 |
| Wintec | Ligier JS P3 | Nissan VK50VE 5.0L V8 | 7 | (France) Julien Neveu (France) Edouard Hery (France) Cyril Denis | 1–2 |
| Duqueine Engineering | Ligier JS P3 | Nissan VK50VE 5.0L V8 | 8 | (Switzerland) Antonin Borga | 1–2 |
| Duqueine Engineering | Ligier JS P3 | Nissan VK50VE 5.0L V8 | 8 | (Sweden) Henning Engqvist | 1–2 |
| Duqueine Engineering | Ligier JS P3 | Nissan VK50VE 5.0L V8 | 9 | (France) Gilles Duqueine | 1–2 |
| Duqueine Engineering | Ligier JS P3 | Nissan VK50VE 5.0L V8 | 9 | (Switzerland) Lucas Légeret | 1 |
| Duqueine Engineering | Ligier JS P3 | Nissan VK50VE 5.0L V8 | 9 | (France) Nelson Panciatici | 1–2 |
| Duqueine Engineering | Ligier JS P3 | Nissan VK50VE 5.0L V8 | 9 | (Switzerland) David Droux | 2 |
| EuroInternational | Ligier JS P3 | Nissan VK50VE 5.0L V8 | 9 | (San Marino) Yoshiki Ohmura (San Marino) Thomas Loefflad (San Marino) Martin Grab | 1–2 |
| DB Autosport | Norma M30 | Nissan VK50VE 5.0L V8 | 20 | (France) Jean-Ludovic Foubert (France) Jacques Wolff (Switzerland) Nicolas Maulini | 1–2 |
| Inter Europol Competition | Ligier JS P3 | Nissan VK50VE 5.0L V8 | 22 | (Poland) Jakub Śmiechowski | 1–2 |
| Inter Europol Competition | Ligier JS P3 | Nissan VK50VE 5.0L V8 | 22 | (Germany) Hendrik Still | 1–2 |
| Inter Europol Competition | Ligier JS P3 | Nissan VK50VE 5.0L V8 | 22 | (Germany) Peter Elkmann | 1–2 |
| Inter Europol Competition | Ligier JS P3 | Nissan VK50VE 5.0L V8 | 33 | (Germany) Paul Scheuschner | 1–2 |
| Inter Europol Competition | Ligier JS P3 | Nissan VK50VE 5.0L V8 | 33 | (France) Xavier Michel | 1–2 |
| Inter Europol Competition | Ligier JS P3 | Nissan VK50VE 5.0L V8 | 33 | (Germany) Alexander Müller | 2 |
| Graff | Ligier JS P3 | Nissan VK50VE 5.0L V8 | 39 | (France) Eric Trouillet (France) Franck Gauvin (France) Remy de Guffroy | 1–2 |
| N'Race | Ligier JS P3 | Nissan VK50VE 5.0L V8 | 93 | (France) Pierre Fontaine (France) Christophe Decultot (France) Jordan Perroy | 1–2 |
| Araujo FB Team | ADESS-03 | Nissan VK50VE 5.0L V8 | 103 | (Portugal) Gonçalo Araújo (France) Sylvain Boulay (Portugal) João Calado Luís | 1 |
| BHK Motorsport | Ligier JS P3 | Nissan VK50VE 5.0L V8 | 735 | (Italy) Francesco Dracone (Italy) Jacopo Baratto | 1–2 |

=== GTV1 ===
| Team | Chassis | Engine | No. | Drivers | Round |
|---|---|---|---|---|---|
| Visiom | Ferrari 488 GT3 | Ferrari F154 3,9L V8 | 1 | (France) Jean-Paul Pagny (France) Thierry Perrier (France) Jean-Bernard Bouvet | 1–2 |
| V de V / AB Sport Auto | Renault R.S. 01 | Nismo VR38DETT 3.8L V6 | 11 | (France) Eric van de Vyver | 1–2 |
| V de V / AB Sport Auto | Renault R.S. 01 | Nismo VR38DETT 3.8L V6 | 11 | (France) Franck Thybaud | 1–2 |
| V de V / AB Sport Auto | Renault R.S. 01 | Nismo VR38DETT 3.8L V6 | 11 | (France) Maxime Jousse | 1 |
| V de V / AB Sport Auto | Renault R.S. 01 | Nismo VR38DETT 3.8L V6 | 11 | (Italy) Tiziano Carugati | 2 |
| Classic & Modern Racing | Ferrari 458 GT3 | Ferrari F136 4.5L V8 | 44 | (France) David Loger | 1–2 |
| Classic & Modern Racing | Ferrari 458 GT3 | Ferrari F136 4.5L V8 | 44 | (France) Eric Mouez | 1–2 |
| Classic & Modern Racing | Ferrari 458 GT3 | Ferrari F136 4.5L V8 | 44 | (France) Sylvain Debs | 1 |
| Classic & Modern Racing | Ferrari 458 GT3 | Ferrari F136 4.5L V8 | 44 | (France) Jérémy Reymond | 2 |
| AB Sport Auto | Lamborghini Huracán GT3 | Lamborghini 5.2L V10 | 46 | (France) Henry Teneketzian (France) Joffrey de Narda | 1–2 |
| IMSA Performance | Porsche 911 GT3 R | Porsche 4.0L flat-6 | 76 | (France) Raymond Narac | 1 |
| IMSA Performance | Porsche 911 GT3 R | Porsche 4.0L flat-6 | 76 | (France) Thierry Cornac | 1–2 |
| IMSA Performance | Porsche 911 GT3 R | Porsche 4.0L flat-6 | 76 | (France) Nicolas Armindo | 2 |
| AGS Events | Lamborghini Huracán LP620-2 Super Trofeo | Lamborghini 5.2L V10 | 89 | (France) Nicolas Gomar (France) Joseph Collado | 1 |

=== GTV2 ===
| Team | Chassis | Engine | No. | Drivers | Round |
|---|---|---|---|---|---|
| RMS | Porsche 991 Cup | Porsche 3.8L flat-6 | 56 | (France) Yannick Mallegol | 1–2 |
| RMS | Porsche 991 Cup | Porsche 3.8L flat-6 | 56 | (Italy) Howard Blank | 1–2 |
| RMS | Porsche 991 Cup | Porsche 3.8L flat-6 | 56 | (France) Frank Mechaly | 2 |
| Porsche Alméras | Porsche 997 GT3 Cup S | Porsche 3.8L flat-6 | 65 | (France) Pierre Martinet (France) Gerard Tremblay (France) Steven Palette | 1 |
| IMSA Performance | Porsche 991 Cup | Porsche 3.8L flat-6 | 67 | (France) Arnaud Pierre (France) Nicolas Armindo | 1 |

== Race calendar and results ==
Bold indicates overall winner.

| Round | Circuit | Date | Pole position | Fastest lap | PFV winner | LMP3 winner | GTV1 winner | GTV2 winner | Race |
|---|---|---|---|---|---|---|---|---|---|
| 1 | (Spain) Circuit de Barcelona-Catalunya | 19 March | No. 52 Simpson Motorsport | No. 52 Simpson Motorsport | **No. 52 Simpson Motorsport** | No. 9 Duqueine Engineering | No. 76 IMSA Performance | No. 4 RMS | 4 Hours of Barcelona |
| 1 | (Spain) Circuit de Barcelona-Catalunya | 19 March | (United Kingdom) Charlie Robertson (United Kingdom) Sennan Fielding | (United Kingdom) Charlie Robertson (United Kingdom) Sennan Fielding | (United Kingdom) **Charlie Robertson** **(United Kingdom) Sennan Fielding** | (France) Gilles Duqueine (Switzerland) Lucas Légeret (France) Nelson Panciatici | (France) Raymond Narac (France) Thierry Cornac | (France) Yannick Mallegol (Italy) Howard Blank | 4 Hours of Barcelona |
| 2 | (Portugal) Algarve International Circuit | 30 April | No. 57 Pegasus Racing | No. 57 Pegasus Racing | No. 57 Pegasus Racing | **No. 22 Inter Europol Competition** | No. 46 AB Sport Auto | No. 56 RMS | 6 Hours of Portimao |
| 2 | (Portugal) Algarve International Circuit | 30 April | (United Kingdom) Mike Simpson (United Kingdom) Simon Murray (United Kingdom) Tom Hibbert | (United Kingdom) Mike Simpson (United Kingdom) Simon Murray (United Kingdom) Tom Hibbert | (United Kingdom) Mike Simpson (United Kingdom) Simon Murray (United Kingdom) Tom Hibbert | **(Poland) Jakub Śmiechowski** **(Germany) Hendrik Still** **(Germany) Peter Elkmann** | (France) Henry Teneketzian (France) Joffrey de Narda | (France) Yannick Mallegol (Italy) Howard Blank (France) Frank Mechaly | 6 Hours of Portimao |
| 3 | (France) Circuit Paul Ricard | 28 May | | | | | | | 4 Hours of Paul Ricard |
| 4 | (France) Dijon-Prenois | 25 June | | | **No. 16 DEMJ Team** | | | | 3 Hours of Dijon |
| 4 | (France) Dijon-Prenois | 25 June | | | **(France) Patrick Sarrailh** **(Italy) Max Mugelli** | | | | 3 Hours of Dijon |
| 5 | (Spain) Circuito del Jarama | 3 September | | | **No. 16 DEMJ Team** | | | | 4 Hours of Jarama |
| 5 | (Spain) Circuito del Jarama | 3 September | | | **(France) Patrick Sarrailh** **(Italy) Max Mugelli** | | | | 4 Hours of Jarama |
| 6 | (France) Circuit de Nevers Magny-Cours | 8 October | | | **No. 16 DEMJ Team** | | | | 4 Hours of Magny-Cours |
| 6 | (France) Circuit de Nevers Magny-Cours | 8 October | | | (France) **Patrick Sarrailh** **(Italy) Max Mugelli** | | | | 4 Hours of Magny-Cours |
| 7 | (Portugal) Autódromo Fernanda Pires da Silva | 5 November | | | **No. 16 DEMJ Team** | | | | 6 Hours of Estoril |
| 7 | (Portugal) Autódromo Fernanda Pires da Silva | 5 November | | | (France) **Patrick Sarrailh** **(Italy) Max Mugelli** | | | | 6 Hours of Estoril |
