= Mechaly =

Mechaly is a French surname that may refer to the following notable people:

- Frank Mechaly (born 1975), French jeans designer and brand maker
- Gaëlle Méchaly (born 1970), French operatic soprano
- Nathaniel Méchaly (born 1972), French musician and film composer, brother of Gaëlle
- Sophie Mechaly (born 1967), French designer, wife of Frank
