= 2017 GT & Prototype Challenge =

Car racing competition

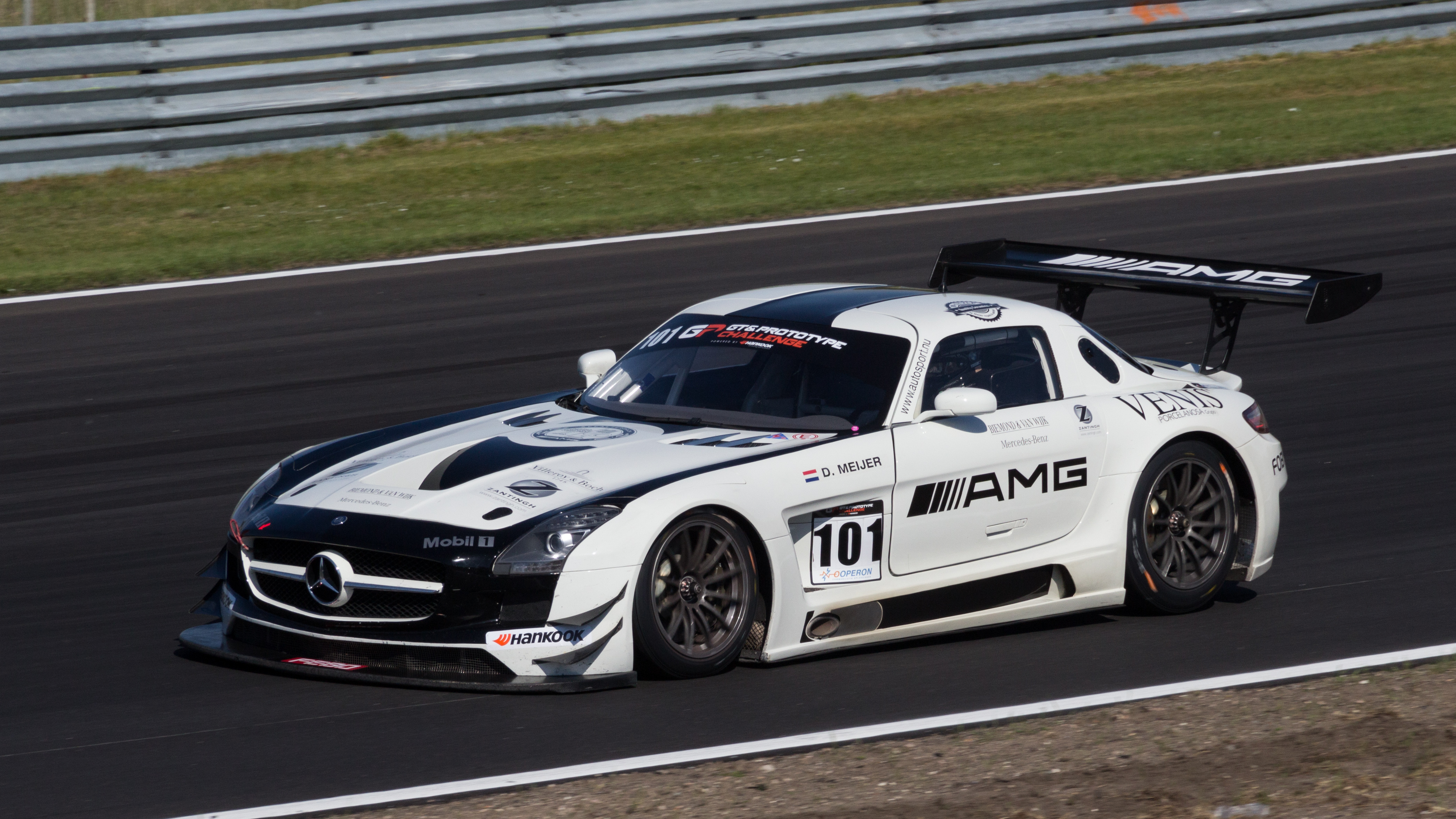
Daan Meijer was the Super GT Champion.

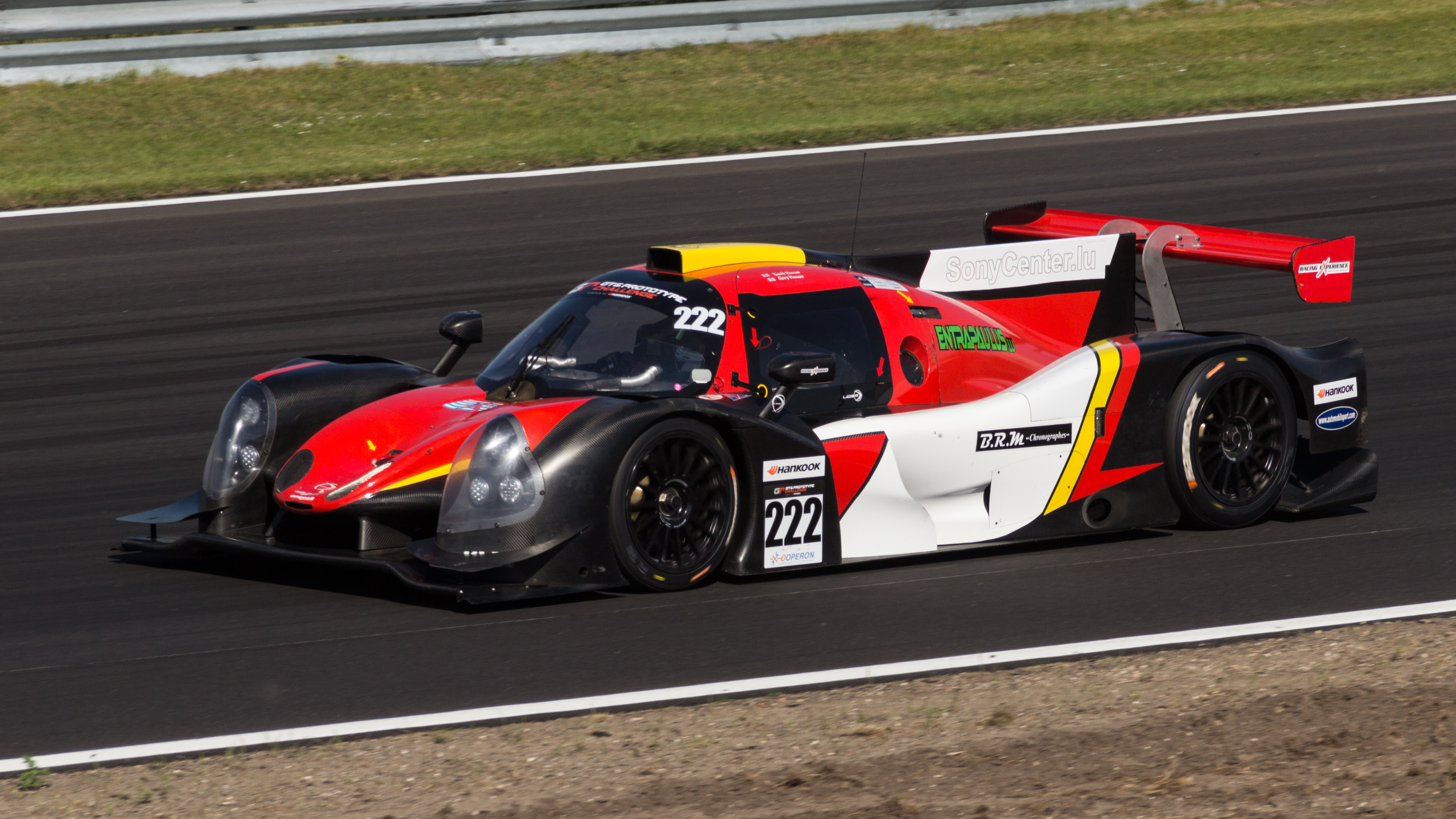
David and Gary Hauser were the LMP3 Champions.

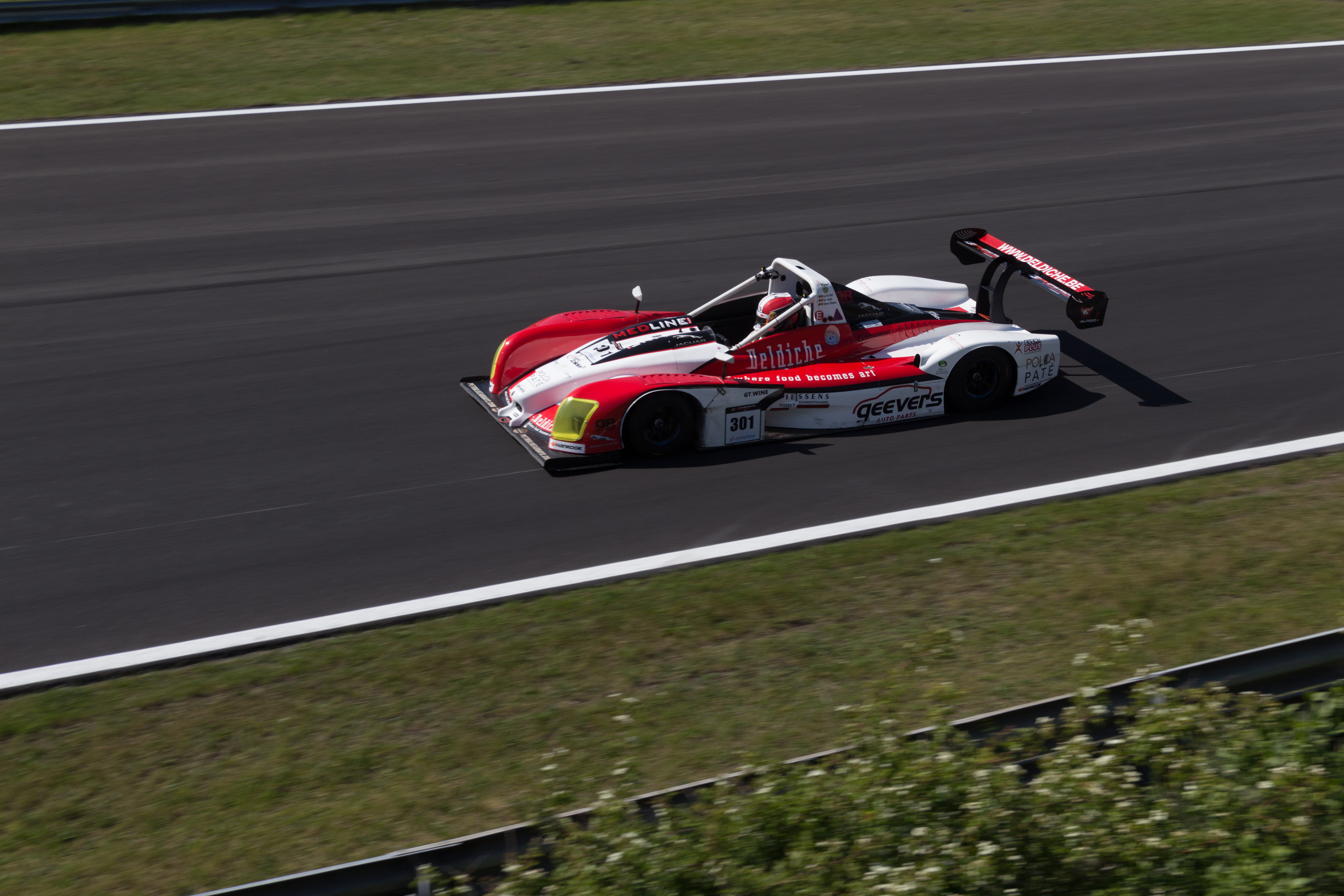
Luc de Cock and Tim Joosen were the Group CN Champions.

The 2017 GT & Prototype Challenge was the 1st season of the GT & Prototype Challenge. The Super GT and Superlights classes of the Supercar Challenge were split from the original series to form the new championship.

== Regulations ==
The series entrants are divided over four classes. The GT class, from the Supercar Challenge Super GT class, forms the highest and fastest division. Cars with a 2,8kg per HP or more ratio are allowed to compete. This includes all Group GT3 class cars and specially built GT's such as the Solution F built Volvo S60 and Renault Sport R.S. 01. LMP3 spec cars first raced in the Supercar Challenge Super GT class in 2016. The class forms a separate class within the series open to all 2016 specification LMP3 machinery.

Two classes from the Supercar Challenge Superlights class are included in the new series. The fastest of the two is the Group CN class. Group CN specification cars built after 2014 are allowed to compete. The fourth, and slowest, class is the Radical SR3 class. Mainly a Radical SR3 spec class, the class is open to cars with comparable lap times. Also allowed are the Praga R1 and pre-2014 Group CN class cars.

== Entry list ==
Team	Chassis	Engine	No.	Drivers	Rounds
Super GT
(Netherlands) JR Motorsport	Mercedes-Benz SLS AMG GT3	Mercedes-Benz M156 6.2 L V8	101	(Netherlands) Daan Meijer	1, 4–5
(Netherlands) de Jong Racing	Mercedes-AMG GT3	Mercedes-AMG M159 6.2 L V8	106	(Netherlands) Daniël de Jong	6
(Netherlands) de Jong Racing	Mercedes-AMG GT3	Mercedes-AMG M159 6.2 L V8	106	(Netherlands) Henk de Jong	6
(Netherlands) Topper Team	Porsche 997 GT3 Cup	Porsche 3.8 L Flat-6	109	(Netherlands) Sebastiaan Bleekemolen	2
(Netherlands) Topper Team	Porsche 997 GT3 Cup	Porsche 3.8 L Flat-6	109	(Netherlands) Dirk Schulz	2
(United Kingdom) TCS Motorsport	Ginetta G50 GT4	Ford Cyclone 3.5 L V6	128	(United Kingdom) Paul Fleury	2
(Belgium) Speedlover	Porsche 911 GT3 Cup	Porsche 3.8 L Flat-6	153	(Sweden) Hans Hjelm	4
(Netherlands) PUMAXS Racing	Pumax RT	Chevrolet LS7 6.7 L V8	172	(Netherlands) Henk Thuis	1, 6
(Netherlands) BlueBerry Racing	Mosler MT900R GT3	Chevrolet LS7 7.0 L V8	173	(Netherlands) Berry van Elk	1, 4–6
(Netherlands) BlueBerry Racing	Mosler MT900R GT3	Chevrolet LS7 7.0 L V8	173	(Netherlands) Dick van Elk	6
(Netherlands) TransAm EuroRacing	Howe Ford Mustang TA2	Chevrolet LS3 6.2 L V8	180	(Belgium) Hervé Maillien	2
(Netherlands) TransAm EuroRacing	Howe Ford Mustang TA2	Chevrolet LS3 6.2 L V8	181	(Belgium) Alexis van de Poele	2
(Netherlands) TransAm EuroRacing	Howe Ford Mustang TA2	Chevrolet LS3 6.2 L V8	181	(Belgium) Eric van de Poele	2
(Netherlands) TransAm EuroRacing	Howe Ford Mustang TA2	Chevrolet LS3 6.2 L V8	182	(France) Alexandre Berard	3
(Netherlands) TransAm EuroRacing	Howe Ford Mustang TA2	Chevrolet LS3 6.2 L V8	182	(France) Charles-Aime Clerc	3
(France) Team Roscar	Ferrari 458 GT3	Ferrari 4.5 L V8	192	(France) Alexis Berthet	5
(France) Team Roscar	Ferrari 458 GT3	Ferrari 4.5 L V8	192	(France) Patrick Michellier	5
(France) Team Roscar	Saleen S7R	Ford 7.0 L V8	195	(France) Guy Heliou	5
GT entries ineligible to score points
(Netherlands) TransAm EuroRacing	Howe Ford Mustang TA2	Chevrolet LS3 6.2 L V8	180	(Belgium) Amaury Bonduel	1
(Netherlands) TransAm EuroRacing	Howe Ford Mustang TA2	Chevrolet LS3 6.2 L V8	180	(Netherlands) Stéphane Kox	1
(Netherlands) JR Motorsport	BMW M4 Silhouette	BMW S54 3.2 L I6	181	(Netherlands) Koen Bogaerts	1
(Netherlands) JR Motorsport	BMW M4 Silhouette	BMW S54 3.2 L I6	181	(Netherlands) Bas Schouten	1
(Netherlands) DVB Racing	Porsche 911 GT3 Cup	Porsche 3.8 L Flat-6	184	(France) Alexandre Jouannem	1
(Netherlands) DVB Racing	Porsche 911 GT3 Cup	Porsche 3.8 L Flat-6	184	(Turkey) Cengiz Oguzhan	1
(France) Team Roscar	Porsche 997 GT3 Cup	Porsche 3.8 L Flat-6	187	(France) Jean Jacques Lega	5
(France) Team Roscar	Porsche 997 GT3 Cup	Porsche 3.8 L Flat-6	188	(France) Eric Bazonnet	5
(France) Team Roscar	Porsche 997 GT3 Cup	Porsche 3.8 L Flat-6	188	(France) Laurent Cochard	5
(France) Team Roscar	Porsche 997 GT3 Cup	Porsche 3.8 L Flat-6	189	(France) Jean-Pierre Levasseur	5
(France) Team Roscar	Porsche 997 GT3 Cup	Porsche 3.8 L Flat-6	189	(France) Jean-Charles Levy	5
(France) Team Roscar	Porsche 997 GT3 Cup	Porsche 3.8 L Flat-6	190	(France) George Canas	5
(France) Team Roscar	Porsche 997 GT3 Cup	Porsche 3.8 L Flat-6	197	(Switzerland) Thomas Winkler	5
(France) Team Roscar	Porsche 997 GT3 Cup	Porsche 3.8 L Flat-6	198	(Switzerland) Tomas Pfister	5
(France) Team Roscar	Porsche 997 GT3 Cup	Porsche 3.8 L Flat-6	198	(Switzerland) Alfred Winkler	5
(France) Team Roscar	Porsche 996 GT3 Cup	Porsche 3.8 L Flat-6	191	(France) Denis Baron	5
(France) Team Roscar	Porsche 996 GT3 Cup	Porsche 3.8 L Flat-6	191	(France) David Defaux	5
(France) Team Roscar	Porsche Cayman GT4 Clubsport MR	Porsche 3.8 L Flat-6	193	(Belgium) Thierry Genetier	5
(France) Team Roscar	Porsche Cayman GT4 Clubsport MR	Porsche 3.8 L Flat-6	193	(France) Marc Peraldi	5
(France) Team Roscar	Porsche 911 GT3 Cup	Porsche 3.8 L Flat-6	194	(France) Régis Rego de Sebes	5
(Netherlands) ABOG	Porsche 911 GT3 Cup	Porsche 3.8 L Flat-6	190	(Netherlands) Aart Bosman	1
(Netherlands) Moritz Racing	Marcos Mantis	Ford 5.0 L V8	191	(Netherlands) Bert Moritz	1
(Netherlands) Moritz Racing	Marcos Mantis	Ford 5.0 L V8	191	(Netherlands) Patrick Moritz	1
LMP3
(Luxembourg) Prime Racing	Ginetta G57 P2	Chevrolet LS3 6.2 L V8	202	(Luxembourg) Jean-Pierre Lequeux	1–3
(Luxembourg) Prime Racing	Ginetta G57 P2	Chevrolet LS3 6.2 L V8	202	(Luxembourg) Jean-Marc Ueberecken	1–3
(Poland) Inter Europol Competition	Ligier JS P3	Nissan VK50VE 5.0 L V8	203	(Poland) Jakub Śmiechowski	1–5
(Poland) Inter Europol Competition	Ligier JS P3	Nissan VK50VE 5.0 L V8	203	(Germany) Wolfgang Jordan	1
(Poland) Inter Europol Competition	Ligier JS P3	Nissan VK50VE 5.0 L V8	203	(Germany) Cristopher Dreyspring	3–4
(Poland) Inter Europol Competition	Ligier JS P3	Nissan VK50VE 5.0 L V8	204	(Germany) Martin Hippe	1–2, 5
(Poland) Inter Europol Competition	Ligier JS P3	Nissan VK50VE 5.0 L V8	204	(Germany) Hans Laub	1
(Poland) Inter Europol Competition	Ligier JS P3	Nissan VK50VE 5.0 L V8	204	(France) Philippe Bourgeois	2
(Poland) Inter Europol Competition	Ligier JS P3	Nissan VK50VE 5.0 L V8	204	(Sweden) Pontus Fredricsson	5
(Luxembourg) Racing Experience	Ligier JS P3	Nissan VK50VE 5.0 L V8	222	(Luxembourg) David Hauser	All
(Luxembourg) Racing Experience	Ligier JS P3	Nissan VK50VE 5.0 L V8	222	(Luxembourg) Gary Hauser	4–6
(Netherlands) Equipe Verschuur	Renault RS 01 Trophy	Gibson 3.8 L V6	226	(Netherlands) Sandor van Es	1
(Netherlands) Equipe Verschuur	Renault RS 01 Trophy	Gibson 3.8 L V6	226	(Netherlands) Rob Kamphues	1
(Netherlands) Equipe Verschuur	Renault RS 01 Trophy	Gibson 3.8 L V6	227	(Belgium) Sam Dejonghe	5
(Netherlands) Equipe Verschuur	Renault RS 01 Trophy	Gibson 3.8 L V6	227	(Belgium) Stéphane Lémeret	5
(Germany) AFK Motorsport	Renault RS 01 Trophy	Gibson 3.8 L V6	228	(Germany) Oliver Freymuth	2–3, 5
(Denmark) KEO Racing	Ligier JS P3	Nissan VK50VE 5.0 L V8	243	(Sweden) Joakim Frid	5
(Denmark) KEO Racing	Ligier JS P3	Nissan VK50VE 5.0 L V8	243	(Australia) Roman Krumins	5
(Netherlands) Peter Kox Motorsport	Ligier JS P3	Nissan VK50VE 5.0 L V8	248	(Netherlands) Peter Kox	4
(Netherlands) Peter Kox Motorsport	Ligier JS P3	Nissan VK50VE 5.0 L V8	248	(Netherlands) Stéphane Kox	4
G57
(Luxembourg) Prime Racing	Ginetta G57 P2	Chevrolet LS3 6.2 L V8	202	(Luxembourg) Jean-Pierre Lequeux	5
(Luxembourg) Prime Racing	Ginetta G57 P2	Chevrolet LS3 6.2 L V8	202	(Luxembourg) Jean-Marc Ueberecken	5
(Belgium) Powermotorsports	Norma M20 FC	Chevrolet LS3 6.2 L V8	290	(Germany) Siegmar Pfeifer	5
Group CN
(Belgium) Deldiche Racing (Note: Car no. 301 was entered as Deldiche Racing and car no. 333 was entered as Norma Benelux) (Belgium) Norma Benelux	Norma M20 FC	Honda K20A 2.0 L I4	301	(Belgium) Luc de Cock	1–3, 6
(Belgium) Deldiche Racing (Belgium) Norma Benelux	Norma M20 FC	Honda K20A 2.0 L I4	301	(Belgium) Tim Joosen	1–3, 6
(Belgium) Deldiche Racing (Belgium) Norma Benelux	Norma M20 FC	Honda K20A 2.0 L I4	301	(Belgium) Sam Dejonghe	3
(Belgium) Deldiche Racing (Belgium) Norma Benelux	Norma M20 FC	Honda K20A 2.0 L I4	333	(Belgium) David Houthoofd	2
(United Kingdom) Hulford Racing	Wolf GB08	Honda K20A 2.0 L I4	337	(United Kingdom) Gerry Hulford	5
(United Kingdom) Hulford Racing	Wolf GB08	Honda K20A 2.0 L I4	337	(United Kingdom) Miles Hulford	5
(Luxembourg) Alain Berg	Radical SR8	Suzuki RPE 2.7 L V8	339	(Luxembourg) Alain Berg	4
(Luxembourg) Alain Berg	Radical SR8	Suzuki RPE 2.7 L V8	339	(Netherlands) Henk Thuis	4
(Netherlands) Bas Koeten Racing	Wolf GB08	Honda K20A 2.0 L I4	340	(Netherlands) Rob Kamphues	4
(Netherlands) Bas Koeten Racing	Wolf GB08	Honda K20A 2.0 L I4	340	(Netherlands) Leon Rijnbeek	4
(Netherlands) JR Motorsport	Radical SR8	Suzuki RPE 2.7 L V8	341	(Netherlands) Bob Herber	4, 6
(Netherlands) JR Motorsport	Radical SR8	Suzuki RPE 2.7 L V8	341	(Netherlands) Daan Meijer	6
(Netherlands) Daniel Schildgen	Radical SR8	Suzuki RPE 2.7 L V8	342	(Netherlands) Daniel Schildgen	6
(Germany) Team Aschoff	Praga R1T	Renault F4R 832 2.0 L I4	387	(Germany) Max Aschoff	5
(Germany) Team Aschoff	Praga R1T	Renault F4R 832 2.0 L I4	387	(Germany) Robert Aschoff	5
(Czech Republic) Praga Factory Team	Praga R1T	Renault F4R 832 2.0 L I4	388	(Czech Republic) Ales Jirasek	5
(United Kingdom) VR Motorsport	Praga R1T	Renault F4R 832 2.0 L I4	396	(United Kingdom) Tim Gray	1–4, 6
(United Kingdom) VR Motorsport	Praga R1T	Renault F4R 832 2.0 L I4	396	(United Kingdom) Alastair Boulton	1, 4–5
(United Kingdom) VR Motorsport	Praga R1T	Renault F4R 832 2.0 L I4	396	(United Kingdom) Oliver Hewitt	2–3
(United Kingdom) VR Motorsport	Praga R1T	Renault F4R 832 2.0 L I4	396	(Luxembourg) Alain Berg	5–6
SR3-Praga
(Netherlands) Blueberry Racing	Praga R1	Renault F4R 832 2.0 L I4	401	(United Kingdom) Fiona James	1–2, 4, 6
(Netherlands) Blueberry Racing	Praga R1	Renault F4R 832 2.0 L I4	401	(Netherlands) Cor Euser	3
(Netherlands) Blueberry Racing	Praga R1	Renault F4R 832 2.0 L I4	402	(Netherlands) Dick van Elk	2–4, 6
(Netherlands) V-Max Racing	Praga R1	Renault F4R 832 2.0 L I4	402	(Netherlands) Dick van Elk	5
(Netherlands) V-Max Racing	Praga R1	Renault F4R 832 2.0 L I4	408	(Netherlands) Daniel Schildgen	5
(Belgium) Wim Jeuris	Radical SR3L	Suzuki RPE 1.5 L I4	403	(Belgium) Wim Jeuris	1–5
(Netherlands) EHK2	Ligier JS51	Honda K20A 2.0 L I4	405	(Netherlands) Cristian Holtappels	3
(Netherlands) Ko Koppejan	Radical SR3	Suzuki RPE 1.5 L I4	406	(Netherlands) Ko Koppejan	1

== Race results ==
Rounds 1, 3 and 6 are co-headlined by the TCR Benelux Touring Car Championship.

Round		Circuit	Date	Super GT Winning Car	GT Winning Car	LMP3 Winning Car	Group CN Winning Car	SR3 - Praga Winning Car	Supporting
Round		Circuit	Date	Super GT Winning Drivers	GT Winning Drivers	LMP3 Winning Drivers	Group CN Winning Drivers	SR3 - Praga Winning Drivers	Supporting
1	R1	(Netherlands) Zandvoort	20 May	(Netherlands) No. 101 JR Motorsport	(Netherlands) No. 181 JR Motorsport	(Netherlands) No. 226 Equipe Verschuur	(Belgium) No. 301 Deldiche Racing	(Netherlands) No. 406 Ko Koppejan	Jumbo Family Racing Days
1	R1	(Netherlands) Zandvoort	20 May	(Netherlands) Daan Meijer	(Netherlands) Koen Bogaerts (Netherlands) Bas Schouten	(Netherlands) Sandor van Es (Netherlands) Rob Kamphues	(Belgium) Luc de Cock (Belgium) Tim Joosen	(Netherlands) Ko Koppejan	Jumbo Family Racing Days
1	R2	(Netherlands) Zandvoort	21 May	(Netherlands) No. 172 PUMAXS Racing	(Netherlands) No. 181 JR Motorsport	(Luxembourg) No. 222 Racing Experience	(Belgium) No. 301 Deldiche Racing	(Netherlands) No. 401 Blueberry Racing	Jumbo Family Racing Days
1	R2	(Netherlands) Zandvoort	21 May	(Netherlands) Henk Thuis	(Netherlands) Koen Bogaerts (Netherlands) Bas Schouten	(Luxembourg) David Hauser	(Belgium) Luc de Cock (Belgium) Tim Joosen	(United Kingdom) Fiona James	Jumbo Family Racing Days
2	R1	(Belgium) Spa-Francorchamps	10 June	(United Kingdom) No. 128 TCS Motorsport	Merged with Super GT class	(Luxembourg) No. 222 Racing Experience	(Belgium) No. 301 Deldiche Racing	(Belgium) No. 403 Wim Jeuris	Spa Euro Race
2	R1	(Belgium) Spa-Francorchamps	10 June	(United Kingdom) Paul Fleury	Merged with Super GT class	(Luxembourg) David Hauser	(Belgium) Luc de Cock (Belgium) Tim Joosen	(Belgium) Wim Jeuris	Spa Euro Race
2	R2	(Belgium) Spa-Francorchamps	11 June	(Netherlands) No. 180 TransAm EuroRacing	Merged with Super GT class	(Luxembourg) No. 202 Prime Racing	(Belgium) No. 333 Norma Benelux	(Belgium) No. 403 Wim Jeuris	Spa Euro Race
2	R2	(Belgium) Spa-Francorchamps	11 June	(Belgium) Hervé Maillien	Merged with Super GT class	(Luxembourg) Jean-Pierre Lequeux (Luxembourg) Jean-Marc Ueberecken	(Belgium) David Houthoofd	(Belgium) Wim Jeuris	Spa Euro Race
3	R1	(Belgium) Zolder	15 July	(Netherlands) No. 182 TransAm EuroRacing	Merged with Super GT class	(Poland) No. 203 Inter Europol Competition	(Belgium) No. 301 Deldiche Racing	(Netherlands) No. 401 Blueberry Racing	Zolder Superprix
3	R1	(Belgium) Zolder	15 July	(France) Alexandre Berard (France) Charles-Aime Clerc	Merged with Super GT class	(Germany) Cristopher Dreyspring (Poland) Jakub Śmiechowski	(Belgium) Luc de Cock (Belgium) Tim Joosen (Belgium) Sam Dejonghe	(Netherlands) Cor Euser	Zolder Superprix
3	R2	(Belgium) Zolder	16 July	(Netherlands) No. 182 TransAm EuroRacing	Merged with Super GT class	(Poland) No. 203 Inter Europol Competition	(United Kingdom) No. 396 VR Motorsport	(Netherlands) No. 401 Blueberry Racing	Zolder Superprix
3	R2	(Belgium) Zolder	16 July	(France) Alexandre Berard (France) Charles-Aime Clerc	Merged with Super GT class	(Germany) Cristopher Dreyspring (Poland) Jakub Śmiechowski	(United Kingdom) Tim Gray (United Kingdom) Oliver Hewitt	(Netherlands) Cor Euser	Zolder Superprix
4	R1	(Netherlands) Assen	5 August	(Belgium) No. 153 Speedlover	Merged with Super GT class	(Luxembourg) No. 222 Racing Experience	(Netherlands) No. 341 JR Motorsport	(Netherlands) No. 401 Blueberry Racing	Gamma Racing Days
4	R1	(Netherlands) Assen	5 August	(Sweden) Hans Hjelm	Merged with Super GT class	(Luxembourg) David Hauser (Luxembourg) Gary Hauser	(Netherlands) Bob Herber	(United Kingdom) Fiona James	Gamma Racing Days
4	R2	(Netherlands) Assen	6 August	(Netherlands) No. 101 JR Motorsport	Merged with Super GT class	(Poland) No. 203 Inter Europol Competition	(Luxembourg) No. 339 Alain Berg	(Belgium) No. 403 Wim Jeuris	Gamma Racing Days
4	R2	(Netherlands) Assen	6 August	(Netherlands) Daan Meijer	Merged with Super GT class	(Germany) Cristopher Dreyspring (Poland) Jakub Śmiechowski	(Luxembourg) Alain Berg (Netherlands) Henk Thuis	(Belgium) Wim Jeuris	Gamma Racing Days
5	R1	(Belgium) Spa-Francorchamps	30 September	(Netherlands) No. 173 BlueBerry Racing	Merged with Super GT class	(Netherlands) No. 227 Equipe Verschuur	(Czech Republic) No. 388 Praga Factory Team	(Netherlands) No. 408 V-Max Racing	Racing Festival
5	R1	(Belgium) Spa-Francorchamps	30 September	(Netherlands) Berry van Elk	Merged with Super GT class	(Belgium) Sam Dejonghe (Belgium) Stéphane Lémeret	(Czech Republic) Ales Jirasek	(Netherlands) Daniel Schildgen	Racing Festival
5	R2	(Belgium) Spa-Francorchamps	1 October	(Netherlands) No. 101 JR Motorsport	Merged with Super GT class	(Poland) No. 203 Inter Europol Competition	(Czech Republic) No. 388 Praga Factory Team	(Belgium) No. 403 Wim Jeuris	Racing Festival
5	R2	(Belgium) Spa-Francorchamps	1 October	(Netherlands) Daan Meijer	Merged with Super GT class	(Poland) Jakub Śmiechowski	(Czech Republic) Ales Jirasek	(Belgium) Wim Jeuris	Racing Festival
6	R1	(Netherlands) Assen	21 October	(Netherlands) No. 172 PUMAXS Racing	Merged with Super GT class	(Luxembourg) No. 222 Racing Experience	(Belgium) No. 301 Deldiche Racing	(Netherlands) No. 401 Blueberry Racing	Formido Finaleraces
6	R1	(Netherlands) Assen	21 October	(Netherlands) Henk Thuis	Merged with Super GT class	(Luxembourg) David Hauser (Luxembourg) Gary Hauser	(Belgium) Luc de Cock (Belgium) Tim Joosen	(United Kingdom) Fiona James	Formido Finaleraces
6	R2	(Netherlands) Assen	22 October	(Netherlands) No. 106 de Jong Racing	Merged with Super GT class	(Luxembourg) No. 222 Racing Experience	(Netherlands) No. 341 JR Motorsport	(Netherlands) No. 401 Blueberry Racing	Formido Finaleraces
6	R2	(Netherlands) Assen	22 October	(Netherlands) Daniël de Jong (Netherlands) Henk de Jong	Merged with Super GT class	(Luxembourg) David Hauser (Luxembourg) Gary Hauser	(Netherlands) Bob Herber (Netherlands) Daan Meijer	(United Kingdom) Fiona James	Formido Finaleraces

=== Drivers' championships ===
Pos.	Driver	Team	ZAN (Netherlands)		SPA (Belgium)		ZOL (Belgium)		ASS (Netherlands)		SPA (Belgium)		ASS (Netherlands)		Points
Super GT
1	(Netherlands) Daan Meijer	(Netherlands) JR Motorsport	**7**	Ret					**DNS**	5	15	11			96
2	(Netherlands) Henk Thuis	(Netherlands) PUMAXS Racing	9	9									3	9	89
3	(Netherlands) Berry van Elk	(Netherlands) BlueBerry Racing	13	Ret					10	DNS	7	Ret	8	8	82
4	(Netherlands) Daniël de Jong (Netherlands) Henk de Jong	(Netherlands) de Jong Racing											5	1	46
5	(Belgium) Hervé Maillien	(Netherlands) TransAm EuroRacing			9	7									45
6	(Sweden) Hans Hjelm	(Belgium) Speedlover							9	11					45
7	(Netherlands) Sebastiaan Bleekemolen (Netherlands) Dirk Schulz	(Netherlands) Topper Team			10	9									39
8	(France) Guy Heliou	(France) Team Roscar									16	14			32
9	(France) Alexandre Berard (France) Charles-Aime Clerc	(Netherlands) TransAm EuroRacing					**10**	10							29
10	(United Kingdom) Paul Fleury	(United Kingdom) TCS Motorsport			8	DNS									25
11	(France) Alexis Berthet (France) Patrick Michellier	(France) Team Roscar									**11**	DNS			23
12	(Belgium) Alexis van de Poele (Belgium) Eric van de Poele	(Netherlands) TransAm EuroRacing			**Ret**	Ret									3
Entries ineligible to score points
	(Netherlands) Koen Bogaerts (Netherlands) Bas Schouten	(Netherlands) JR Motorsport	10	4											0
	(Netherlands) Aart Bosman	(Netherlands) ABOG	11	6											0
	(France) Alexandre Jouannem (Turkey) Cengiz Oguzhan	(Netherlands) DVB Racing	DNS	10											0
	(Belgium) Amaury Bonduel (Netherlands) Stéphane Kox	(Netherlands) TransAm EuroRacing	Ret	11											0
	(Netherlands) Bert Moritz (Netherlands) Patrick Moritz	(Netherlands) Moritz Racing	DNS	12											0
	(Switzerland) Thomas Winkler	(France) Team Roscar									21	13			0
	(France) George Canas	(France) Team Roscar									13	Ret			0
	(France) Régis Rego de Sebes	(France) Team Roscar									14	Ret			0
	(France) Jean Jacques Lega	(France) Team Roscar									22	16			0
	(Switzerland) Tomas Pfister (Switzerland) Alfred Winkler	(France) Team Roscar									17	22			0
	(France) Eric Bazonnet (France) Laurent Cochard	(France) Team Roscar									Ret	17			0
	(France) Jean-Pierre Levasseur (France) Jean-Charles Levy	(France) Team Roscar									18	18			0
	(Belgium) Thierry Genetier (France) Marc Peraldi	(France) Team Roscar									19	19			0
	(France) Denis Baron (France) David Defaux	(France) Team Roscar									24	23			0
LMP3
1	(Luxembourg) David Hauser	(Luxembourg) Racing Experience	2	1	**1**	3	3	2	**1**	3	4	7	**1**	2	249
1	(Luxembourg) Gary Hauser	(Luxembourg) Racing Experience							**1**	3	4	7	**1**	2	249
2	(Poland) Jakub Śmiechowski	(Poland) Inter Europol Competition	**3**	5	2	2	**1**	1	5	1	5	2			208
2	(Germany) Wolfgang Jordan	(Poland) Inter Europol Competition	**3**	5											208
2	(Germany) Cristopher Dreyspring	(Poland) Inter Europol Competition					**1**	1	5	1					208
3	(Luxembourg) Jean-Pierre Lequeux (Luxembourg) Jean-Marc Ueberecken	(Luxembourg) Prime Racing	6	2	7	1	4	4			8	6			136
4	(Germany) Martin Hippe	(Poland) Inter Europol Competition	4	7	DNS	DNS					9	4			76
4	(Germany) Hans Laub	(Poland) Inter Europol Competition	4	7											76
4	(France) Philippe Bourgeois	(Poland) Inter Europol Competition			3	4									76
4	(Sweden) Pontus Fredricsson	(Poland) Inter Europol Competition									9	4			76
5	(Germany) Oliver Freymuth	(Germany) AFK Motorsport			5	5	6	Ret			3	8			64
6	(Belgium) Sam Dejonghe (Belgium) Stéphane Lémeret	(Netherlands) Equipe Verschuur									**1**	3			49
7	(Netherlands) Peter Kox (Netherlands) Stéphane Kox	(Netherlands) Peter Kox Motorsport							2	2					40
8	(Netherlands) Sandor van Es (Netherlands) Rob Kamphues	(Netherlands) Equipe Verschuur	1	8											36
9	(Sweden) Joakim Frid (Australia) Roman Krumins	(Denmark) KEO Racing									12	9			16
Entries ineligible to score points
	(Germany) Siegmar Pfeifer	(Belgium) Powermotorsports									**2**	1			0
Group CN
1	(Belgium) Luc de Cock (Belgium) Tim Joosen	(Belgium) Deldiche Racing	**5**	3	**3**	10	**2**	5					**2**	6	194
2	(United Kingdom) Tim Gray	(United Kingdom) VR Motorsport	12	Ret	Ret	Ret	5	3	**4**	7			6	10	107
2	(United Kingdom) Alistair Boulton	(United Kingdom) VR Motorsport	12	Ret					**4**	7	Ret	Ret			107
2	(United Kingdom) Oliver Hewitt	(United Kingdom) VR Motorsport			Ret	Ret	5	3							107
2	(Luxembourg) Alain Berg	(United Kingdom) VR Motorsport									Ret	Ret	6	10	107
3	(Netherlands) Bob Herber	(Netherlands) JR Motorsport							3	9			7	3	84
4	(Czech Republic) Ales Jirasek	(Czech Republic) Praga Factory Team									**7**	5			54
5	(Belgium) David Houthoofd	(Belgium) Norma Benelux			6	5									45
6	(Germany) Max Aschoff (Germany) Robert Aschoff	(Germany) Team Aschoff									10	10			40
7	(Netherlands) Daniel Schildgen	(Netherlands) Daniel Schildgen											4	4	40
8	(Netherlands) Rob Kamphues (Netherlands) Leon Rijnbeek	(Netherlands) Bas Koeten Racing							8	6					30
9	(United Kingdom) Gerry Hulford (United Kingdom) Miles Hulford	(United Kingdom) Hulford Racing									20	12			30
10	(Netherlands) Henk Thuis	(Luxembourg) Alain Berg							Ret	4					26
Entries ineligible to score points
	(Belgium) Sam Dejonghe	(Belgium) Deldiche Racing					**2**	5							0
SR3 - Praga
1	(Belgium) Wim Jeuris	(Belgium) Wim Jeuris	DNS	DNS	**11**	8	8	7	**11**	8	**Ret**	15			169
2	(United Kingdom) Fiona James	(Netherlands) Blueberry Racing	Ret	13	12	12			6	10			**9**	5	159
3	(Netherlands) Dick van Elk	(Netherlands) Blueberry Racing			13	11	9	9	7	DNS			Ret	7	117
3	(Netherlands) Dick van Elk	(Netherlands) V-Max Racing									DNS	21			117
4	(Netherlands) Cor Euser	(Netherlands) Blueberry Racing					**7**	6							52
5	(Netherlands) Ko Koppejan	(Netherlands) Ko Koppejan	**8**	15											49
6	(Netherlands) Daniel Schildgen	(Netherlands) V-Max Racing									23	20			45
7	(Netherlands) Cristian Holtappels	(Netherlands) EHK2					Ret	8							15
Pos.	Driver	Team	ZAN (Netherlands)		SPA (Belgium)		ZOL (Belgium)		ASS (Netherlands)		SPA (Belgium)		ASS (Netherlands)		Points

Key
Colour	Result
Gold	Winner
Silver	Second place
Bronze	Third place
Green	Other points position
Blue	Other classified position
Blue	Not classified, finished (NC)
Purple	Not classified, retired (Ret)
Red	Did not qualify (DNQ)
Red	Did not pre-qualify (DNPQ)
Black	Disqualified (DSQ)
White	Did not start (DNS)
White	Race cancelled (C)
Blank	Did not practice (DNP)
Blank	Excluded (EX)
Blank	Did not arrive (DNA)
Blank	Withdrawn (WD)
Blank	Did not enter (cell empty)
Text formatting	Meaning
**Bold**	Pole position
Italics	Fastest lap
