= Renault Sport R.S. 01 =

Sports racing car

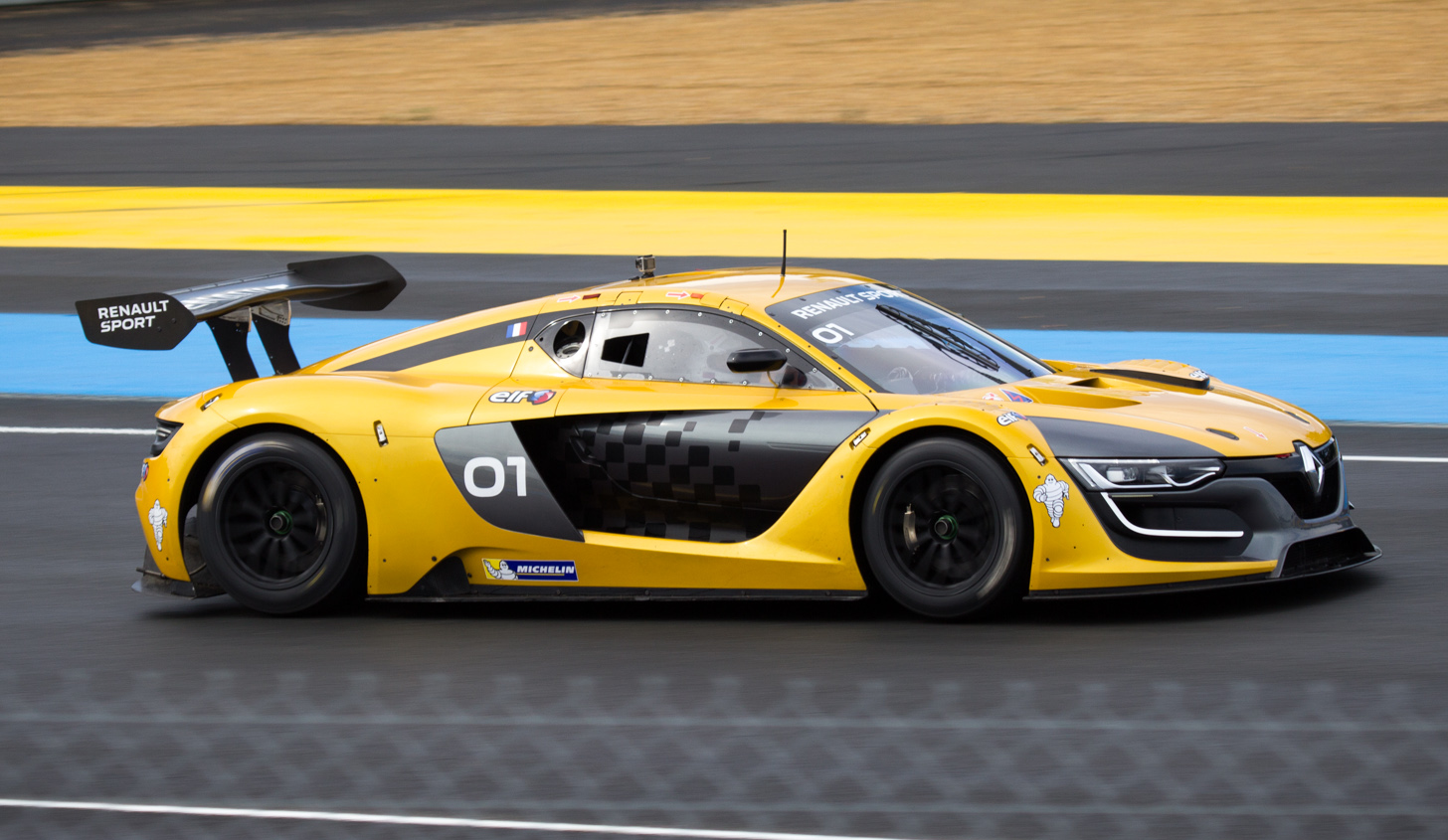
- Category: Renault Sport Trophy; Group GT3 (FFSA homologation)
- Constructor: Renault Sport
- Designers: Akio Shimizu (managed by Laurens van den Acker and Éric Diemert)
- Predecessor: Renault Mégane Trophy

Technical specifications
- Chassis: Carbon-fiber monocoque by Dallara with steel roll cage and crash boxes, based on 2014 FIA LMP1 regulations
- Suspension (front): Double unequal-length wishbones, pushrods, and Öhlins two-way adjustable dampers
- Suspension (rear): Double unequal-length wishbones, pushrods, and Öhlins two-way adjustable dampers
- Length: 4,710 mm (185 in)
- Width: 2,000 mm (79 in)
- Height: 1,116 mm (44 in)
- Wheelbase: 2,744 mm (108 in)
- Engine: Nismo and Gibson Technology tuned VR38DETT 3.8 L (3,799 cc) twin-turbocharged 24-valve V6 in a mid-mounted longitudinal configuration
- Transmission: Sadev 7-speed sequential transmission with limited-slip differential
- Weight: 1,145 kg (2,524 lb) (RST); 1,270 kg (2,800 lb) (GT3)
- Fuel: Elf
- Tyres: Michelin; 30/68 R18 front 31/71 R18 rear

Competition history
- Notable entrants: (France) Team Renault Sport (Netherlands) Equipe Verschuur (Spain) Marc VDS Racing Team (Italy) Oregon Team (Netherlands) V8 Racing
- Notable drivers: (Italy) Dario Capitanio (Netherlands) Luc Braams (Netherlands) Max Braams (Italy) David Fumanelli (Finland) Markus Palttala (Netherlands) Nicky Pastorelli (France) Andrea Pizzitola (Portugal) Miguel Ramos (Germany) Fabian Schiller (Netherlands) Pieter Schothorst (Netherlands) Mike Verschuur
- Debut: Circuit de Spa-Francorchamps
Wins	Podiums	Poles
7 (not including 42 from RST)	13 (not including 126 from RST)	3 (not including 42 from RST)

The Renault Sport R.S. 01 is a sports racing car manufactured by Renault Sport, the performance division of French automaker Renault. It was originally built to compete in the Renault Sport Trophy, the company's one-make racing series, serving as a replacement for the Renault Mégane Trophy. The car was later homologated for Group GT3 by the SRO Motorsports Group for the car to be able to compete in GT3 class racing series. The Trophy-spec R.S. 01 is the most powerful one-make racer built by Renault, and also the only race car not based on a production car.

The vehicle was unveiled at the 2014 Moscow International Automobile Salon.

== Car development ==
The car was designed in Renault's Guyancourt studio by Japanese designer Akio Shimizu, under the management of Laurens van den Acker and Éric Diemert, the design manager and design director, respectively. According to Diemert, the car was intended to have a design reach beyond the regular process, in a way to make it a unique and iconic model among Renault models, and that the process of designing the R.S. 01 was "similar to designing a concept car".

The design of the R.S. 01, completed in five months, is similar to that of a GT race car, with a low-slung aerodynamic design and imbalanced overhangs due to the vehicle's architecture and weight distribution. The R.S. 01 shares design cues with the 2010 Renault DeZir concept car and the 2012 Alpine A110-50 concept racing car.

=== In-depth specifications ===
The R.S. 01 is powered by a 3.8-liter VR38DETT twin-turbocharged 24-valve V6 engine sourced from the Nissan GT-R and tuned by Nismo and Gibson Technology, which has been modified to include dry sump lubrication and to allow for a longitudinal mid-engined configuration. The engine has a redline of 6800 rpm and has been tuned to 550 hp (410 kW; 558 PS) and 443 lb⋅ft (601 N⋅m). This power runs through a 7-speed sequential transmission manufactured by Sadev, with long-lasting, anti-stall functioning clutch plates from ZF, coupled to a limited-slip differential. An electromagnetic actuator constructed by XAP manages the R.S. 01's sequential control, activated with paddles on the steering wheel. Electronic management is from a Pectel SQ6M system with traction control, and data acquisition comes from Cosworth's ICD Pro system. The vehicle's top speed is over 186 mph (300 km/h) and produces 1,200 kg (2,646 lb) of downforce at its top speed.

The chassis is a Dallara-manufactured carbon fiber monocoque with a steel roll cage and crash boxes that conforms to FIA LMP1 regulations from 2014, allowing the car to weigh 1,145 kg (2,524 lb). The car's carbon brake discs, measuring 380 mm (15 in) in diameter and paired with 6-piston calipers, are supplied by PFC (Performance Friction Corporation), with an ABS system from Bosch. The wheels are manufactured by Braid, and the tires, manufactured by Michelin, are constructed specifically for the R.S. 01 (with sizes being 30/68 R18 and 31/71 R18 at the front and rear, respectively). Double wishbone pushrod suspension, with two-way adjustable dampers from Öhlins, is used in both the front and rear.

According to Renault, the R.S. 01's performance places it between a GT3 sports car and a DTM Class One touring car.

==== GT3 homologation ====
Renault entered GT3 racing in 2015 with the R.S.01 after being granted homologation by the FFSA, and to comply with the category regulations, they detuned the car and added weight. The engine's power was decreased to 500 hp (373 kW; 507 PS), but the torque remained the same. The car got a 125 kg (276 lb) increase in weight from its heavier chassis and new ballast. The original carbon-ceramic brakes were swapped out with steel rotors. The ride height was also raised, and the aerodynamics were reworked.

=== R.S. 01 Interceptor ===
In early 2016, Renault created a police interceptor concept version of the R.S. 01 with a full police livery, neon green stripes, and police strobe lights. In the same month, Renault released a video with the police R.S. 01 in action with WRC racing veteran Jean Ragnotti behind the wheel, chasing a speeding motorcycle along a highway before arresting the rider.

== Motorsport history ==
=== Renault Sport Trophy ===
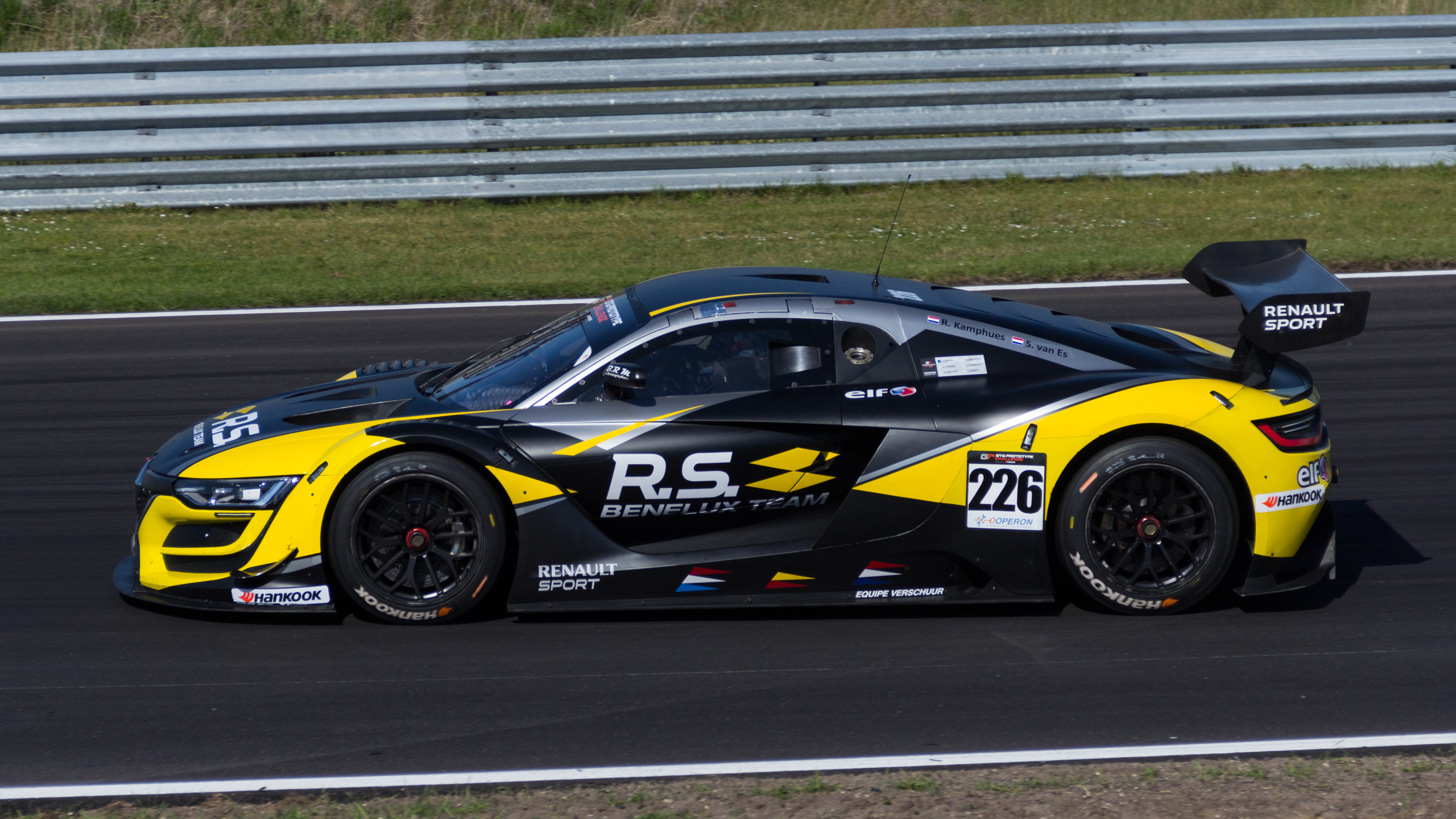
Renault Sport R.S. 01 of Equipe Verschuur at Zandvoort in the 2017 GT & Prototype Challenge.

The Renault Sport R.S. 01 was the host car of the Renault Sport Trophy, the company’s one-make series, up until the series was discontinued in 2016 after two seasons due to low interest from teams and viewers alike as well as the high costs of keeping the Trophy series running. In the two seasons the R.S. 01 raced in, Andrea Pizzitola and Pieter Schothorst would be the Pro class champions, Dario Capitanio and Fabian Schiller would be the Am class champions, and Oregon Team and Marc VDS Racing Team would be the teams’ champions.

The Trophy-spec R.S. 01 continued competing in other racing series, entering in prototype classes or special classes. In 2017, Equipe Verschuur and AFK Motorsport entered the 2017 GT & Prototype Challenge with R.S. 01s in the LMP3 class, competing against LMP3 prototypes. Equipe Verschuur took the overall win in Race 1 of the Circuit Zandvoort round, but would be forced to retire from the race in Race 2. In 2018, French team DEMJ competed in the Circuit de Barcelona-Catalunya round of the 2018 24H GT Series under the PFV-2 prototype class and went on to take the class victory. In 2023, the R.S.01 would race in the Caribbean Clash of Champions.

=== Group GT3 ===
Less than a week after the 2015 Renault Sport Trophy season finale, Renault announced their expansion to Group GT3 sports car racing. The new R.S.01 would feature less power, more weight, and reworked aerodynamics to comply with the regulations.

The new GT3 version of the R.S. 01 was granted homologation by the Fédération Française du Sport Automobile through the SRO Motorsports Group and officially debuted at Circuit Paul Ricard in the season finale of the 2015 FFSA GT Championship. Boutsen-Ginion Racing and Duqueine Engineering each ran a car in the Open class, though both were forced to retire during the race. Monlau Competición also ran a car in the 2015 Supercar Challenge where it competed in three rounds, scoring a win at Circuit de Spa-Francorchamps.

In 2016, the R.S. 01 GT3 participated in a number of racing series. The car would compete in the 2016 24H Series with Duqueine Engineering and V8 Racing in the A6-Pro class, and Equipe Verschuur and Boutsen-Ginion in the A6-Am class. The car would make its first major GT3 victory in Mugello Circuit, where V8 Racing would take the overall win with their #333 entry driven by Luc Braams, Max Braams, Nicky Pastorelli, and Miguel Ramos. Both Equipe Verschuur and Boutsen-Ginion also finished on the podium on the same race in the Am class in 2nd and 3rd. The car also made its first and only appearance in the International GT Open in 2016 where, with V8 Racing, the car achieved four class victories; once in Spa in the Pro class, and three times in the Am class at Spa and Paul Ricard. The team collected four more podiums in Silverstone Circuit and Red Bull Ring with the R.S. 01. Monlau Competición also competed in the Supercar Challenge again for 2016, where the team won two out of the four races it participated in on the two Belgian rounds at Spa and Circuit Zolder.

In 2017, the number of teams running the R.S. 01 in the 24H Series dropped from four to one in the 2017 season, where the car would continue racing with Emirati team GP Extreme, entering in both A6-Pro and A6-Am classifications. The team finished fourth in A6-Pro and thirteenth in A6-Am in the season. The V de V Endurance Series also saw a new team enter the GTV1 classification with the R.S. 01 GT3, as series founder Eric van de Vyver joined forces with French team AB Sport Auto to race during the 2017 season. They gained two podiums and three points finishes and finished third in class.

GP Extreme would leave the A6-Pro class in the 2018 24H GT Series, making A6-Am the primary classification for the team, and throughout the season, they would finish third in the class with car #27, but car #28 would not be classified, as it retired in the first race. As for the V de V Endurance Series, AB Sport Auto would participate in 2018 without van de Vyver. The team competed only once, racing in the Barcelona-Catalunya round and taking the victory.

The R.S. 01 would continue to make one-off appearances in the next few seasons with Equipe Verschuur in the 24H Series. In 2019, the R.S. 01 would race in Barcelona-Catalunya, but the car retired after 88 laps. In 2020, it would compete in Monza Circuit and Hockenheimring, where the car would take pole position in the GT class in both events but would later retire in those events. In 2021, Equipe Verschuur achieved pole position in Mugello but would again retire from the race.

=== 24 Hours of Nürburgring ===
In the 2017 and 2018 editions of the 24 Hours of Nürburgring, German team mcchip-dkr.com entered the endurance event under the SP-X class with a Renault Sport R.S. 01. The team failed to finish on their first attempt but would manage to score a 2nd place finish in their class and 23rd overall the following year.

Year	Team	Drivers	Class	Laps	Pos.	Class Pos.
2017	(Germany) GTronix 360° Team mcchip-dkr	(Germany) Dieter Schmidtmann (Germany) Heiko Hammel (Germany) Dominik Schwager	SP-X	88	Ret	Ret
2018	(Germany) GTronix 360° Team mcchip-dkr	(Germany) Dieter Schmidtmann (Germany) Heiko Hammel (Canada) Kuno Wittmer	SP-X	127	23rd	2nd

== In video games ==
The Renault Sport R.S. 01 is featured in a selection of video games, mobile and console. The car appears in Asphalt 8: Airborne, Asphalt Legends Unite, Real Racing 3, Need for Speed: No Limits, Assoluto Racing[es], Nitro Nation, Top Drives, Project CARS, Project CARS 2, Project Cars 3, The Crew 2, The Crew: Motorfest, Gran Turismo Sport and Gran Turismo 7.

== Gallery ==
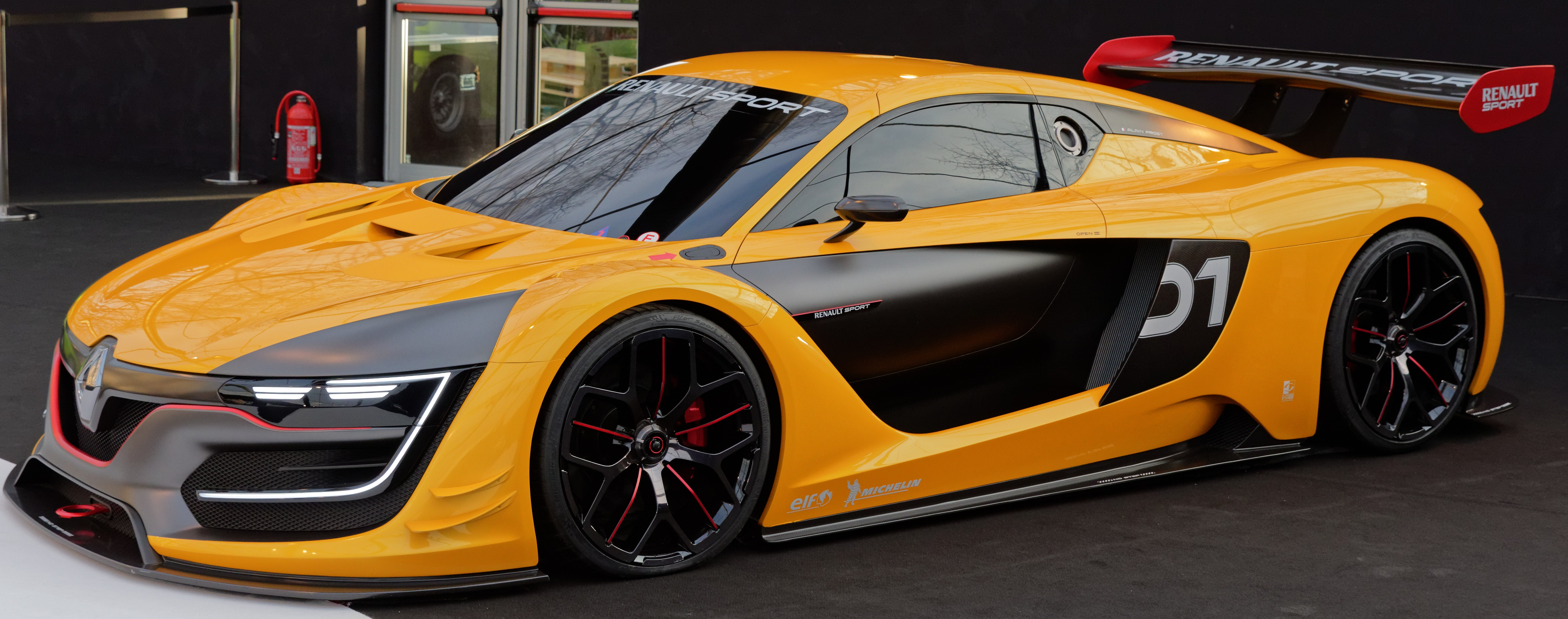
R.S.01 concept on display at the 2015 Festival Automobile International.

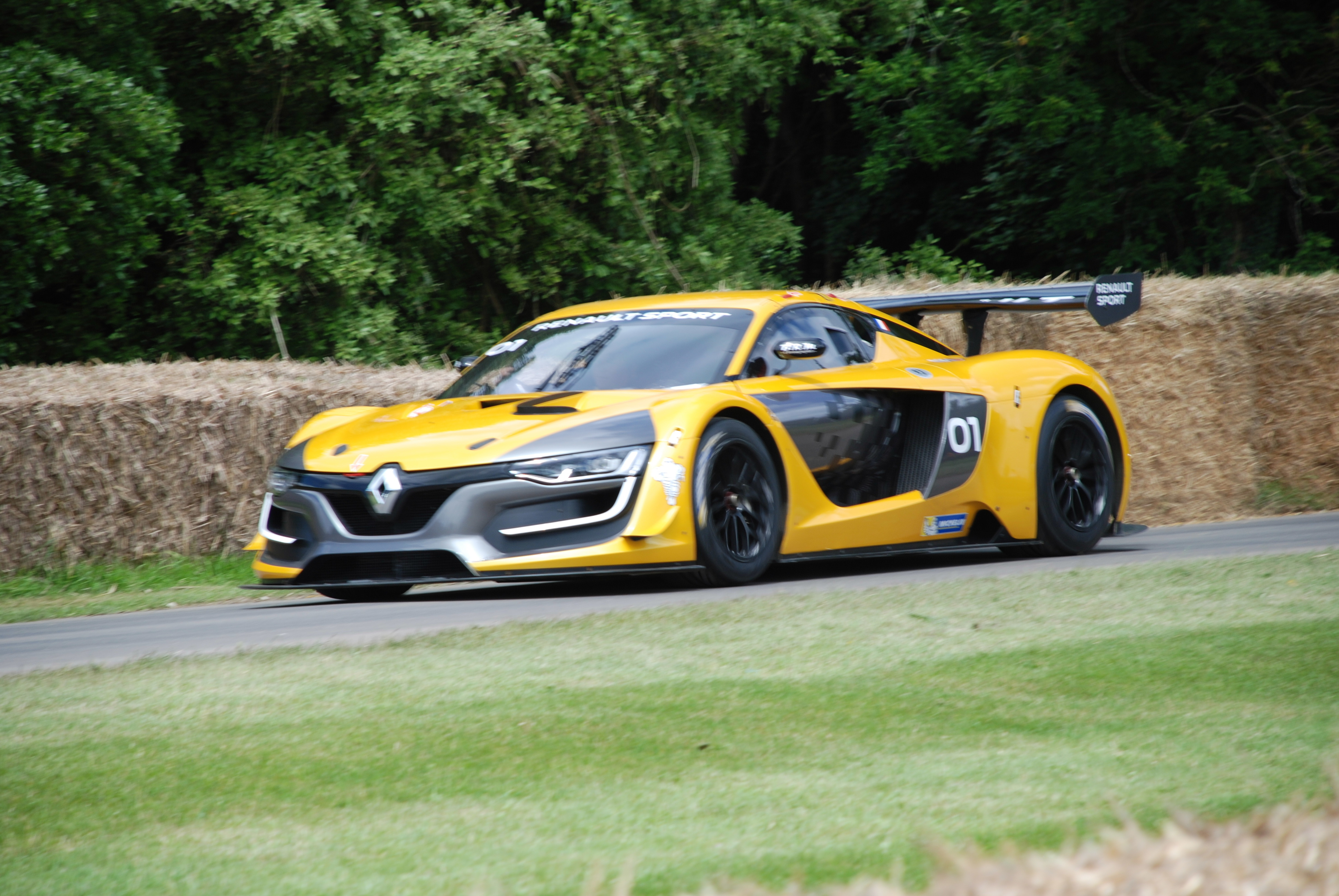
The R.S.01 at the 2016 Goodwood Festival of Speed.

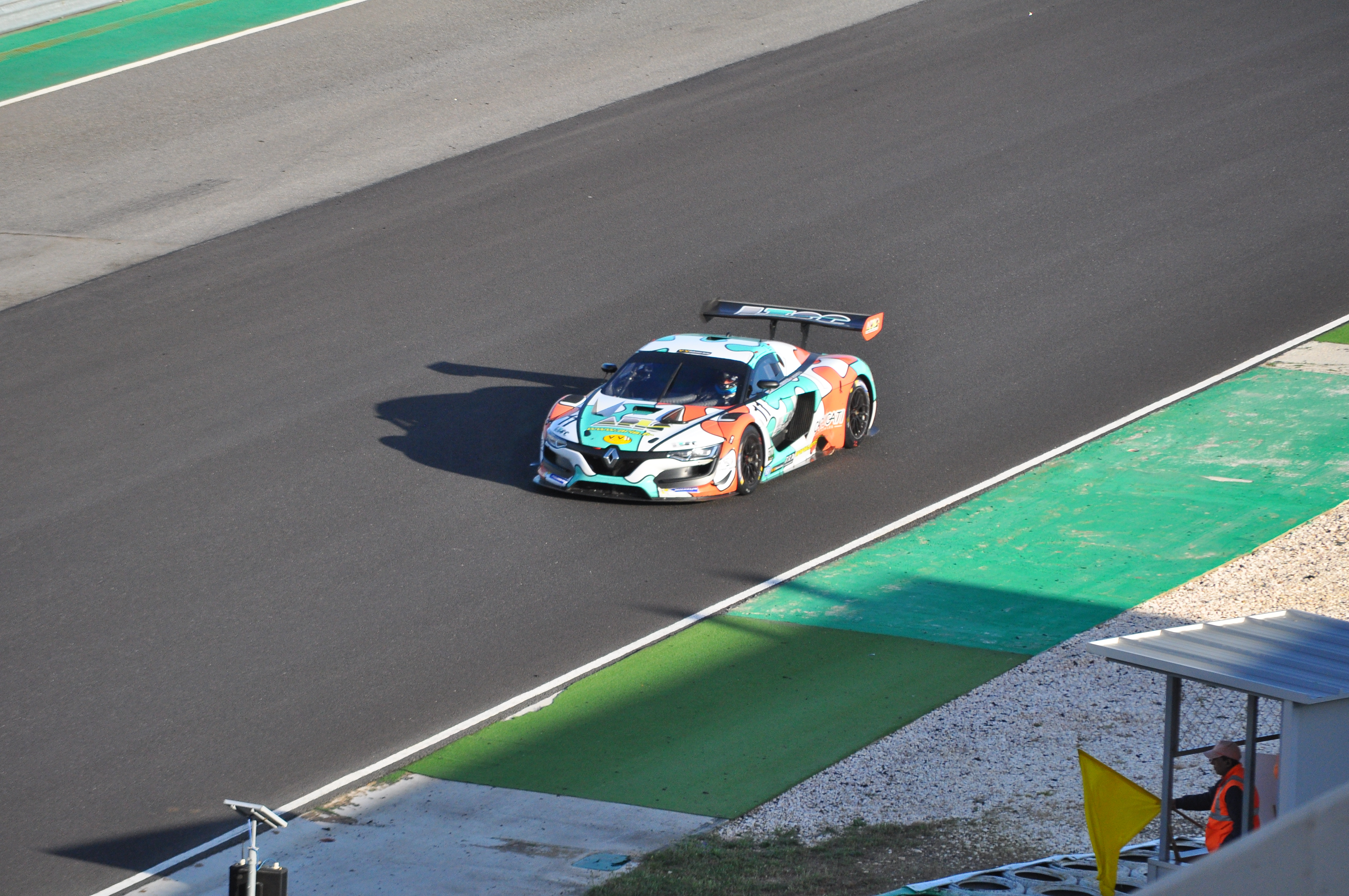
The R.S.01 at the 2017 V de V Endurance Series.

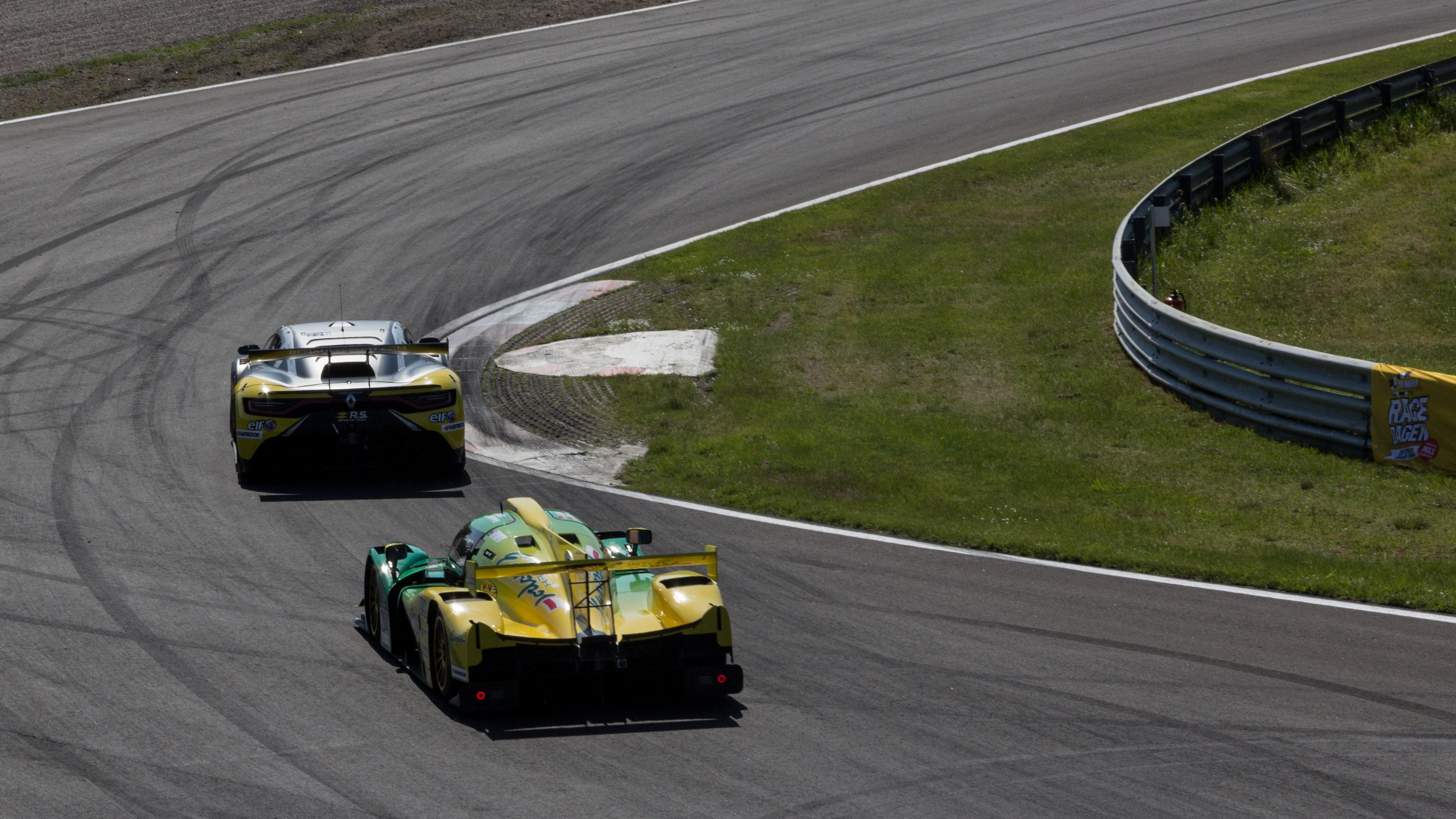
The R.S.01 racing a Ligier JS P3 in the 2017 GT & Prototype Challenge.

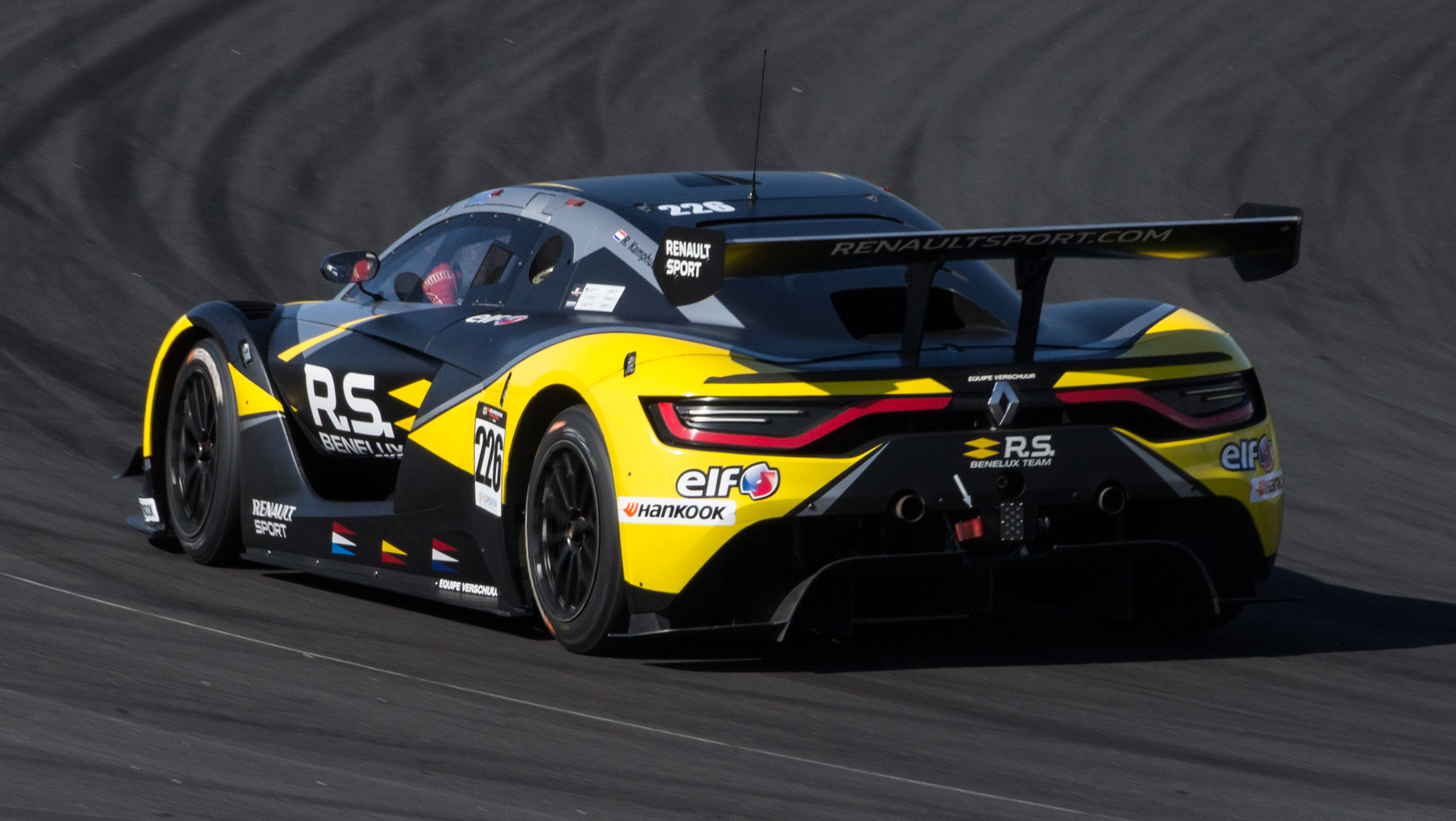
Rear view of the R.S.01.
