= Jakub Śmiechowski =

Polish racing driver

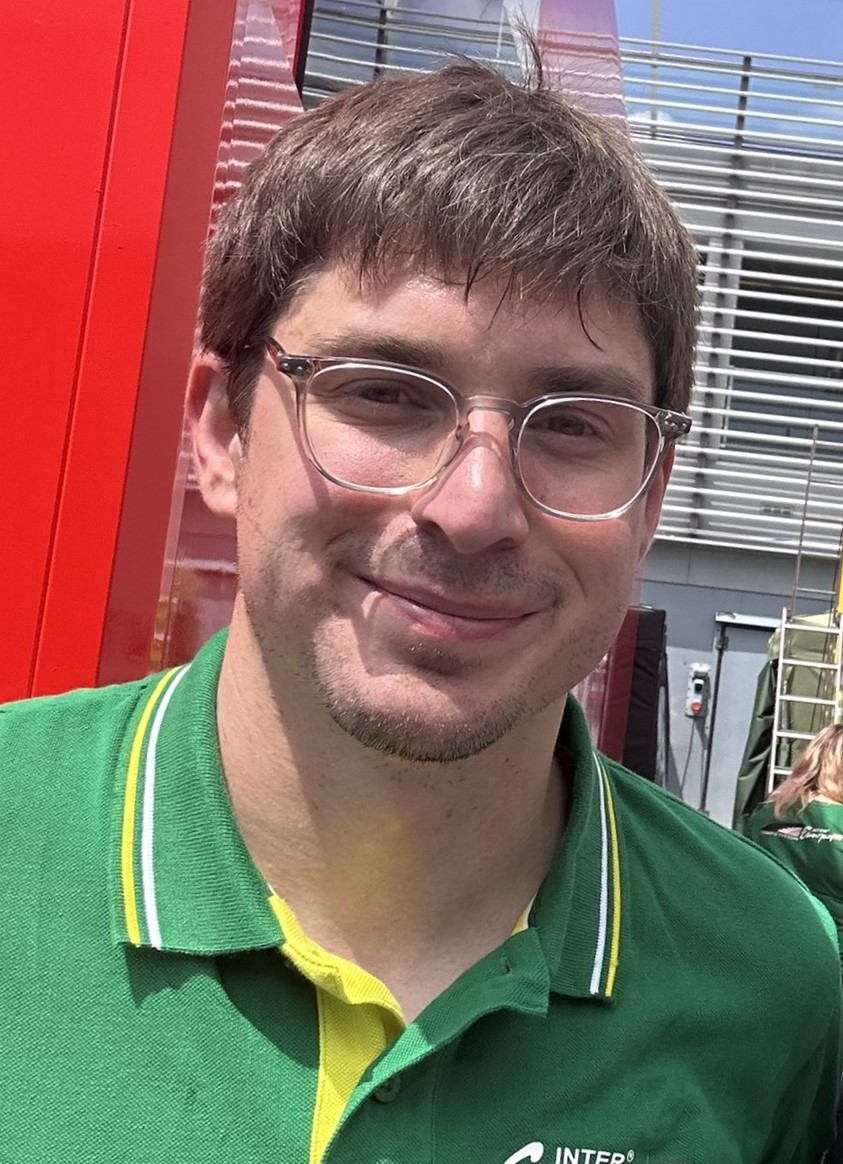
- Śmiechowski in 2023
- Nationality: (Poland) Polish
- Born: Jakub Jerzy Śmiechowski; 11 October 1991 (age 35) Warsaw, Poland

European Le Mans Series career
- Debut season: 2016
- Current team: Inter Europol Competition
- Categorisation: FIA Silver
- Car number: 43
- Starts: 39
- Wins: 2
- Podiums: 9
- Poles: 1
- Fastest laps: 1
- Best finish: 2nd in 2018 (LMP3), 2025 (LMP2)

IMSA SportsCar Championship career
- Debut season: 2024
- Current team: Inter Europol Competition
- Car number: 343
- Starts: 6
- Wins: 0
- Podiums: 3
- Poles: 0
- Fastest laps: 0
- Best finish: 1st in 2024 (LMP2)

24 Hours of Le Mans career
- Years: 2019–
- Teams: Inter Europol Competition
- Best finish: 1st (2023, 2025, 2026)
- Class wins: 3 (2023, 2025, 2026)

Previous series
- 2021–2023 2018-2019–2019-2020 2016–2018 2014–2015 2010–2013 2010–2011: FIA World Endurance Championship; Asian Le Mans Series V de V Endurance Series; BOSS GP - Open; NEC; Eurocup Formula Renault 2.0

Championship titles
- 2018–19 2017 2014: Asian Le Mans Series - LMP3; V de V Endurance - LMP3; BOSS GP - Open

Jakub Jerzy "Kuba" Śmiechowski (born 11 October 1991) is a Polish racing driver and a three-time LMP2 class winner of the 24 Hours of Le Mans. He competes in the IMSA SportsCar Championship and 24 Hours of Le Mans with Inter Europol Competition, where he also serves as team principal.

== Early career ==
After competing in karting, Śmiechowski made his single-seater debut with Kochanski Motorsport in the Italian Formula Renault series in 2009, partaking in three race meetings. He moved into the Formula Renault Northern European Cup the following year. Remaining with Kochanski, the Pole finished seventh in the drivers' standings. In 2011, Śmiechowski switched to his father's team Inter Europol Competition and returned to the NEC series, finishing 12th overall. The two subsequent years saw Śmiechowski contest the NEC two further times, although his finishes would worsen, with 25th place in 2012 and 39th in 2013. During the latter year, Śmiechowski also took part in the Remus Formula Renault 2.0 Cup, where he won the title by taking victory in all six races he participated in.

2014 saw Śmiechowski switching to the BOSS GP championship, which he and Inter Europol would contest with a Dallara GP2/05 as part of the Open class. In his debut season, two race wins and 11 podiums earned the Pole a championship title. He switched to the Formula class in 2015, finishing second in the standings with five victories.

== Sportscar career ==
=== ELMS and V de V Endurance split ===
In 2016, Śmiechowski stepped into sportscar racing, partnering Jens Petersen in the LMP3 category of the European Le Mans Series. There, a best finish of fifth in the Algarve earned the team tenth in the standings. Śmiechowski reaped more rewards in the V de V Challenge, as he and Martin Hippe won the series LMP3 championship.

Śmiechowski and Inter Europol returned to both championships in 2017. The team saw their results improve, as a maiden podium in Le Castellet earned Śmiechowski and Martin Hippe fifth place in the standings. In the V de V Endurance Series, he retained his title thanks to four podiums including two victories alongside full-time teammate Hendrik Still. Additionally, he raced in the GT & Prototype Challenge that year, finishing second in the LMP3 class.

For the 2018 ELMS season, Śmiechowski and Hippe remained teammates at Inter Europol. They had a breakthrough in terms of accolades, with the team's first win in the category coming at the season-ending Portimão round, which, along with a podium at the Red Bull Ring, propelled the pair up to second place in LMP3. During the same year, Śmiechowski contested his final V de V campaign, where he finished fifth with one win. At the end of the year and going into 2019, the Pole managed to win two races in the Asian Le Mans Series alongside Hippe, and two additional second-place finishes earned the team the AsLMS title - as well as an invitation to the 2019 24 Hours of Le Mans.

=== First LMP2 years ===
2019 would be Śmiechowski's debut season in the LMP2 category, which he and Inter Europol contested in the ELMS. A campaign of struggle was in order, as the No. 34 team could not supersede a best race result of 12th on their path to 17th and second-last in the teams' standings. At Le Mans, Śmiechowski, Nigel Moore, and James Winslow battled past technical gremlins with their Ligier JS P217 to finish 16th in the LMP2 class.

During the 2019-2020 winter, Inter Europol came back to the AsLMS, this time in LMP2. Despite partnering seasoned LMP2 veteran Mathias Beche as well as James Winslow, Śmiechowski and his partners took fifth in the standings, one place behind the sister IEC car.

Śmiechowski partnered René Binder and Matevos Isaakyan in the truncated ELMS campaign, having originally been slated to be joined by Beche. The team scored their best finishes in Le Castellet with seventh in the first race and sixth in August, results which helped IEC to finish 12th overall. In addition, Śmiechowski ran at the 24 Hours of Le Mans, where he finished 17th in class alongside his ELMS teammates, and drove in two races of the IMSA SportsCar Championship, where the Pole made his first racing appearances in an Oreca 07.

=== WEC seasons and Le Mans victories ===
Ahead of 2021, Inter Europol made a permanent move to the FIA World Endurance Championship, fielding one Oreca 07 with Śmiechowski, Cadillac factory driver Renger van der Zande, and Alex Brundle in the lineup. The team experienced a consistent opening season, finishing all but one race in the top five, which included fourth at Monza and fifth at Le Mans. With these results, IEC ended up fifth in the teams' standings.

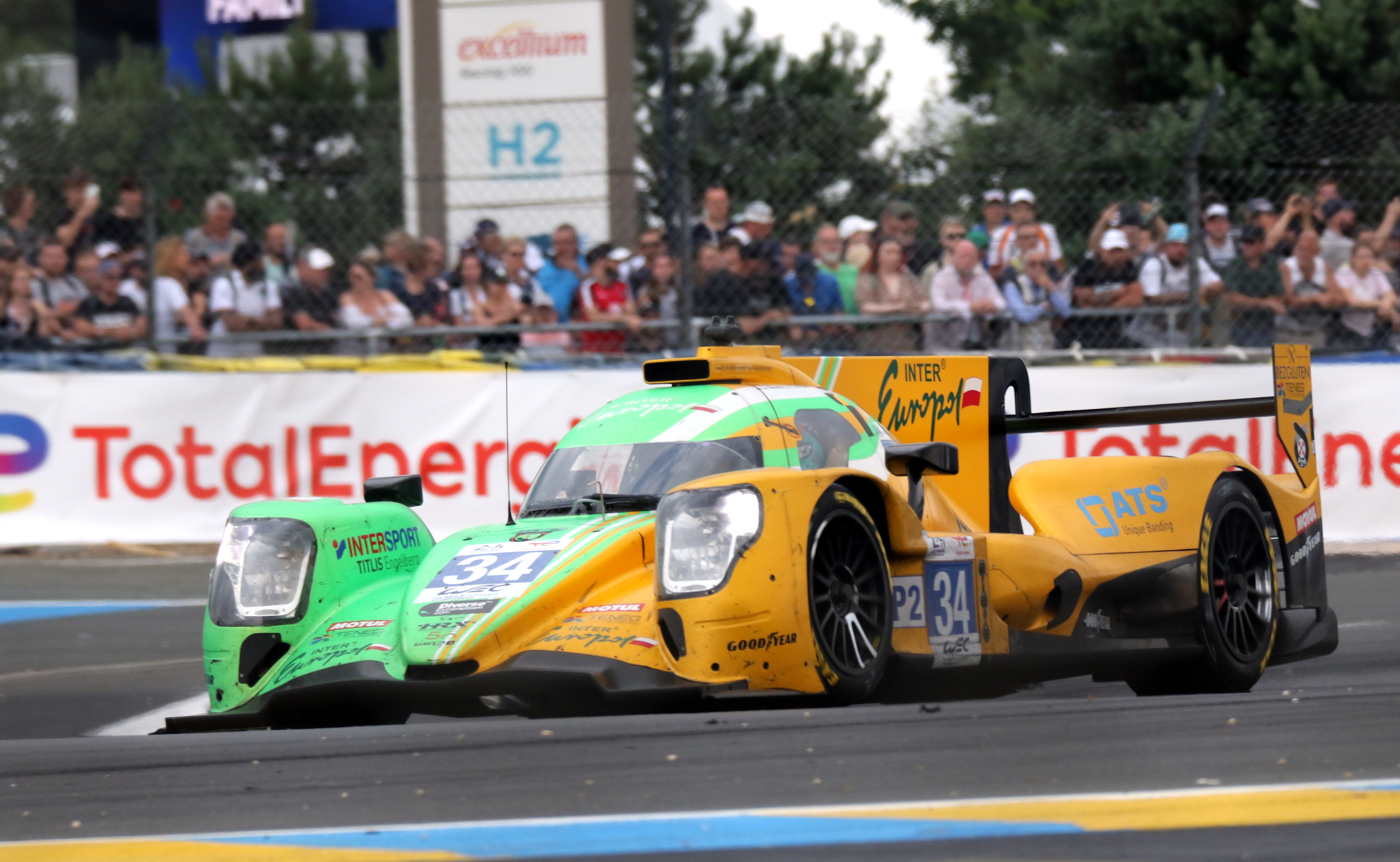
Śmiechowski and his Le Mans-winning Inter Europol Competition Oreca 07.

Remaining in the WEC in 2022, the now team principal Śmiechowski was joined by Brundle and ex-F1 driver Esteban Gutiérrez. A sophomore slump befell the outfit, as the car experienced electrical problems and a damaged clutch at Sebring and Brundle crashed in the wet at Spa. Their fortunes turned slightly after a 13th place in the Le Mans 24h, with a fourth place at Monza being the season highlight. However, IEC missed out on points in the final two rounds, leaving them 11th in the LMP2 table, only ahead of the four Pro-Am lineups.

For the 2023 season, Śmiechowski was partnered by former Lamborghini factory driver Albert Costa and third-year LMP2 racer Fabio Scherer. The trio proved that the team had progressed, scoring points finishes in the opening two races before finishing third at Spa. However, the ultimate triumph came at Le Mans, as Inter Europol were able to take victory despite a foot injury for Scherer and radio issues during the final stages, with Śmiechowski being on pace with the majority of other silver-ranked drivers. With further points finishes during the remaining three races, Śmiechowski and his teammates were able to defend second place in the standings.

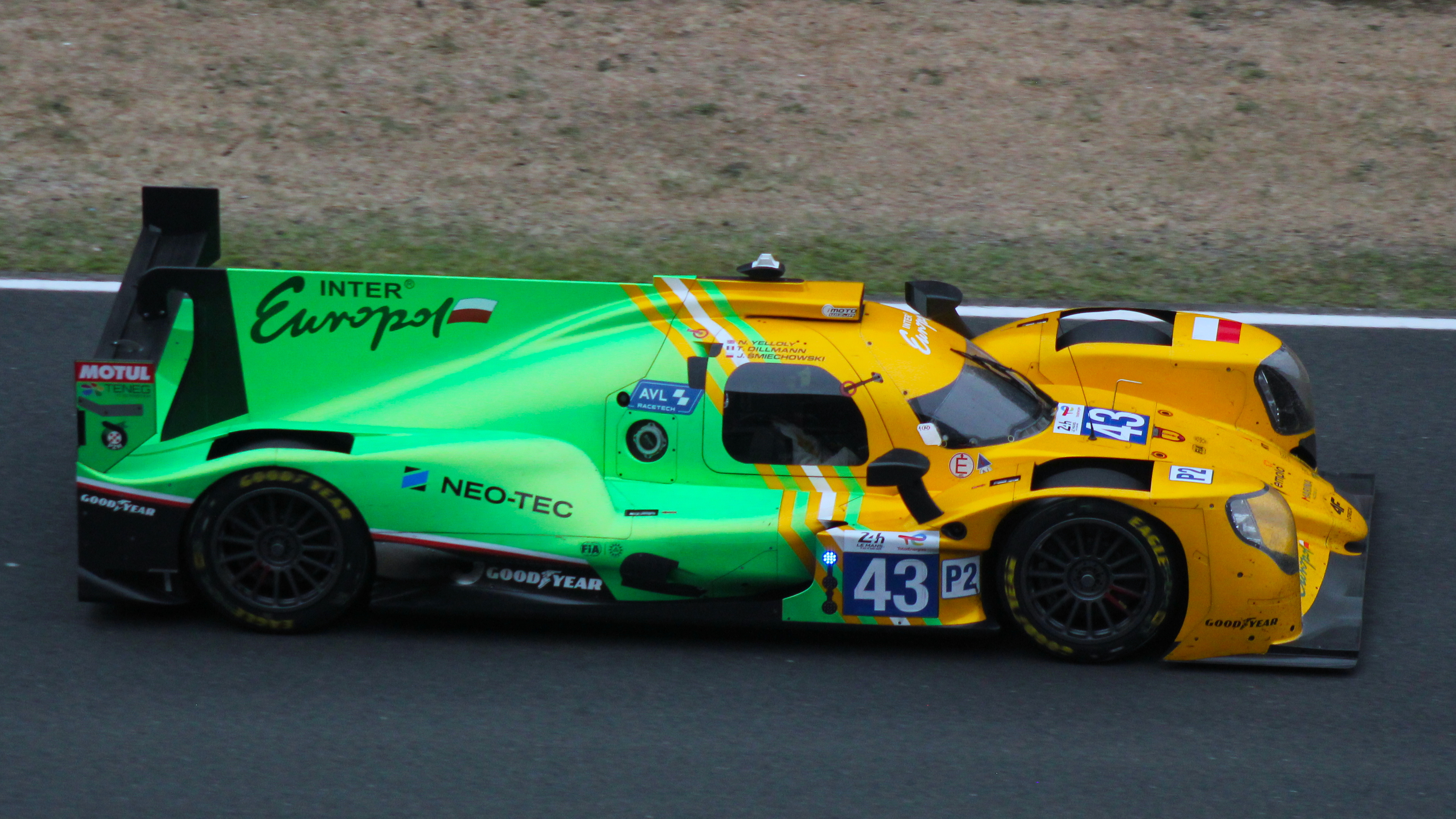
Śmiecowski's class-winning No. 43 car at the 2025 24 Hours of Le Mans

Śmiechowski took a step back from racing full-time in 2024, as he limited his schedule to the Endurance Cup rounds of the IMSA SportsCar Championship. In a season where teammates Tom Dillmann and Nick Boulle won the overall LMP2 title, Śmiechowski aided them with podiums at Watkins Glen and Indianapolis. The trio finished second in the Michelin Endurance Cup standings. Śmiechowski also returned to defend his Le Mans crown in 2024, partnering Clément Novalak and Vladislav Lomko. Despite losing a wheel and dropping one lap behind the leaders on Saturday evening, the team fought back to end the event in second place.

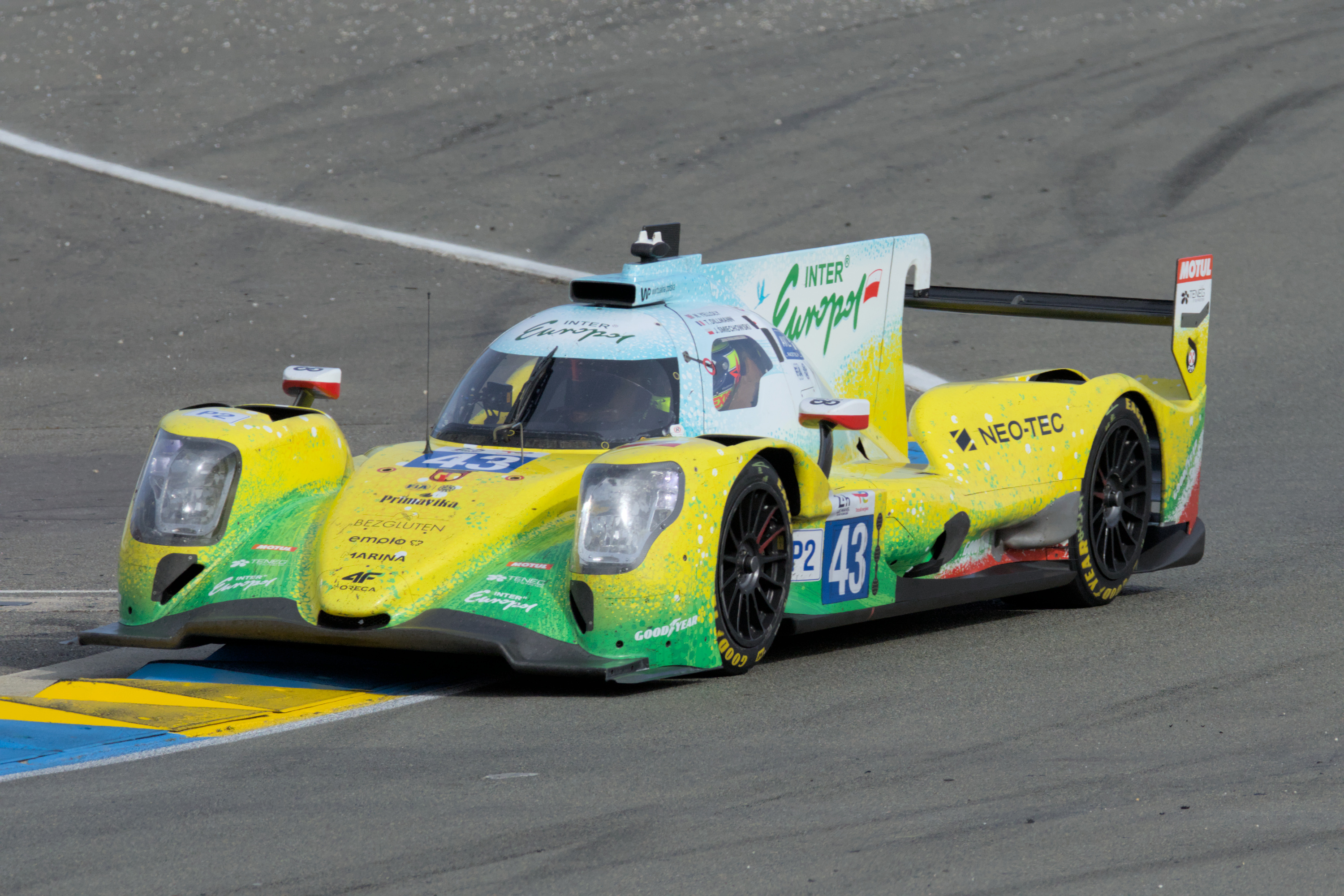
Śmiechowski successfully defended his last year's victory in the 24 Hours of Le Mans in the 2026 edition of the race

Joined by Dillmann and Nick Yelloly, Śmiechowski returned to a full schedule in 2025 with a season in the European Le Mans Series. The season began with a mechanical failure in Barcelona, which dropped the No. 43 IEC squad to tenth in class. Śmiechowski then held the lead for a majority of the opening stint at Paul Ricard, having started on wet tyres, though he was undone by having to pit immediately after a safety car at the end of the first hour. The team managed to recover to second in the Pro class. The 2025 24 Hours of Le Mans yielded more success for Śmiechowski's career: despite having had to change the front bodywork after Śmiechowski ran through the gravel midway through the race, as well as a late drive-through penalty for Yelloly that lost the team the lead, the No. 43 crew profited from a suspension failure for the leading Panis Racing entry of Esteban Masson to retake the lead in the final 20 minutes and claim victory for a second time. The battle with VDS Panis Racing continued throughout the year in the ELMS series, where it ended with a victory for the French team. Five second places in a total of six races earned Śmiechowski and his teammates second place in the overall series standings.

During 2025, Śmiechowski also made his Nordschleife debut.

For 2026, Śmiechowski remained in the ELMS alongside Yelloly and Dillmann. They finished fifth at Barcelona and seventh in class at Le Castellet. Śmiechowski and his teammates entered the 2026 24 Hours of Le Mans as pre-race favourites. They lived up to expectations, driving a clean race and focusing on fuel saving to secure the team's third victory in four years.

== Racing record ==
=== Racing career summary ===
Season	Series	Team	Races	Wins	Poles	F/Laps	Podiums	Points	Position
2009	Formula Renault 2.0 Italy	Kochanski Motorsport Project	6	0	0	0	0	29	21st
2010	Formula Renault 2.0 NEC	Kochanski Motorsport	19	0	0	0	0	193	7th
2010	Eurocup Formula Renault 2.0	Kochanski Motorsport	4	0	0	0	0	0	NC†
2011	Formula Renault 2.0 NEC	Inter Europol Competition	20	0	0	0	0	121	12th
2011	Formula 2000 Light Winter Trophy	Inter Europol Competition	2	0	0	0	1	36	4th
2012	Formula Renault 2.0 NEC	Inter Europol Competition	19	0	0	0	0	75	25th
2013	Formula Renault 2.0 NEC	Inter Europol	15	0	0	0	0	15	39th
2013	Remus Formula Renault 2.0 Cup	Inter Europol Competition	6	6	?	?	6	150	**1st**
2014	BOSS GP - Open	Inter Europol Competition	16	2	1	0	11	276	**1st**
2014	Central European Zone Championship E2-2000	Inter Europol Competition	?	?	?	?	?	112	**3rd**
2014	Remus F3 Cup	Inter Europol Competition	8	3	?	3	7	156	**2nd**
2015	BOSS GP - Formula Class	Inter Europol Competition	14	5	3	5	14	277	**2nd**
2015	Remus F3 Cup	Inter Europol Competition	8	2	2	2	4	121	4th
2015	Central European Zone Championship E2-2000	Inter Europol Competition	?	?	?	?	?	193	**2nd**
2015	Austrian Circuit Championships - Division 1	Inter Europol Competition	?	?	?	?	?	227	**2nd**
2015	ESET V4 Cup - Formula	Inter Europol Competition	?	?	?	?	?	127	**2nd**
2016	Challenge Endurance LMP3 LMP2 V de V	Inter Europol Competition	7	5	3	0	6	294.5	**1st**
2016	European Le Mans Series - LMP3	Inter Europol Competition	6	0	0	0	0	24.5	12th
2017	V de V Endurance Series - LMP3	Inter Europol Competition	7	2	0	0	4	218.5	**1st**
2017	European Le Mans Series - LMP3	Inter Europol Competition	6	0	0	0	1	56	5th
2017	GT & Prototype Challenge - LMP3	Inter Europol Competition	10	4	6	6	9	208	**2nd**
2018	European Le Mans Series - LMP3	Inter Europol Competition	6	1	0	0	2	70.25	**2nd**
2018	V de V Endurance Series - LMP3	Inter Europol Competition	7	1	0	0	4	145.5	5th
2018–19	FIA World Endurance Championship - LMP2	Inter Europol Competition	1	0	0	0	0	0	NC†
2018–19	Asian Le Mans Series - LMP3	Inter Europol Competition	4	2	0	0	4	87	**1st**
2019	European Le Mans Series - LMP2	Inter Europol Competition	6	0	0	0	0	2	28th
2019	24 Hours of Le Mans - LMP2	Inter Europol Competition	1	0	0	0	0	N/A	16th
2019–20	FIA World Endurance Championship - LMP2	Inter Europol Competition	1	0	0	0	0	0	NC†
2019–20	Asian Le Mans Series - LMP2	Inter Europol Endurance	4	0	0	0	0	28	5th
2020	European Le Mans Series - LMP2	Inter Europol Competition	5	0	0	0	0	15.5	16th
2020	IMSA SportsCar Championship - LMP2	Inter Europol Competition	2	0	0	0	1	58	11th
2020	24 Hours of Le Mans - LMP2	Inter Europol Competition	1	0	0	0	0	N/A	17th
2021	FIA World Endurance Championship - LMP2	Inter Europol Competition	6	0	0	0	1	84	6th
2021	24 Hours of Le Mans - LMP2	Inter Europol Competition	1	0	0	0	0	N/A	5
2022	FIA World Endurance Championship - LMP2	Inter Europol Competition	6	0	0	0	0	20	15th
2022	24 Hours of Le Mans - LMP2	Inter Europol Competition	1	0	0	0	0	N/A	13th
2023	FIA World Endurance Championship - LMP2	Inter Europol Competition	7	1	0	0	2	114	**2nd**
2023	24 Hours of Le Mans - LMP2	Inter Europol Competition	1	1	0	0	1	N/A	**1st**
2024	IMSA SportsCar Championship - LMP2	Inter Europol by PR1/Mathiasen Motorsports	5	0	0	0	2	1581	17th
2024	24 Hours of Le Mans - LMP2	Inter Europol Competition	1	0	0	0	1	N/A	**2nd**
2025	24 Hours of Le Mans - LMP2	Inter Europol Competition	1	1	0	0	1	N/A	**1st**
2025	European Le Mans Series - LMP2	Inter Europol Competition	6	0	0	0	5	92	**2nd**
2025	Nürburgring Langstrecken-Serie - BMW M240i	PTerting Sports by Up2Race	2	0	0	0	1	12	NC†
2026	24 Hours of Le Mans - LMP2	Inter Europol Competition	1	1	0	0	1	N/A	**1st**
2026	European Le Mans Series - LMP2	Inter Europol Competition	6	1	1	1	2	59	5th
2026	IMSA SportsCar Championship - LMP2	Inter Europol Competition	1	0	0	0	1	325	33rd

^{*} Season still in progress.
^{†} As Śmiechowski was a guest driver, he was ineligible to score points.

=== Complete Eurocup Formula Renault 2.0 results ===
(key) (Races in bold indicate pole position; races in italics indicate fastest lap)

Year	Entrant	1	2	3	4	5	6	7	8	9	10	11	12	13	14	15	16	DC	Points
2010	Kochanski Motorsport	ALC; 1	ALC; 2	SPA; 1	SPA; 2	BRN; 1	BRN; 2	MAG; 1	MAG; 2	HUN; 1	HUN; 2	HOC; 1; 16	HOC; 2; 13	SIL; 1	SIL; 2	CAT; 1; 16	CAT; 2 Ret	NC†	0
2011	Inter Europol Competition	ALC; 1	ALC; 2	SPA; 1; 22	SPA; 2; 17	NÜR; 1	NÜR; 2	HUN; 1	HUN; 2	SIL; 1	SIL; 2	LEC; 1	LEC; 2	CAT; 1	CAT; 2			NC†	0

† As Śmiechowski was a guest driver, he was ineligible for points.

=== Complete Formula Renault 2.0 NEC results ===
(key) (Races in bold indicate pole position) (Races in italics indicate fastest lap)

Year	Entrant	1	2	3	4	5	6	7	8	9	10	11	12	13	14	15	16	17	18	19	20	Pos	Points
2010	Kochanski Motorsport	HOC; 1; 7	HOC; 2; 4	BRN; 1; 20	BRN; 2; 20	ZAN; 1; 7	ZAN; 2; 9	OSC; 1; 6	OSC; 2; 6	OSC; 3; 8	ASS; 1; 11	ASS; 2; 9	MST; 1 Ret	MST; 2; 17	MST; 3; 22	SPA; 1 Ret	SPA; 2 Ret	SPA; 3; 16	NÜR; 1; 9	NÜR; 2; 9	NÜR; 3 C	7th	193
2011	Inter Europol Competition	HOC; 1; 8	HOC; 2 Ret	HOC; 3; 7	SPA; 1; 22	SPA; 2; 17	NÜR; 1 Ret	NÜR; 2; 14	ASS; 1; 11	ASS; 2 Ret	ASS; 3; 8	OSC; 1; 19	OSC; 2; 15	ZAN; 1; 14	ZAN; 2; 15	MST; 1; 16	MST; 2 Ret	MST; 3; 13	MNZ; 1 Ret	MNZ; 2; 18	MNZ; 3; 17	12th	121
2012	Inter Europol Competition	HOC; 1; 9	HOC; 2 Ret	HOC; 3; 16	NÜR; 1; 15	NÜR; 2 DNS	OSC; 1; 22	OSC; 2; 10	OSC; 3; 13	ASS; 1; 23	ASS; 2; 16	RBR; 1; 19	RBR; 2; 17	MST; 1; 27	MST; 2; 19	MST; 3; 19	ZAN; 1; 13	ZAN; 2 Ret	ZAN; 3; 11	SPA; 1 Ret	SPA; 2; 10	25th	75
2013	Inter Europol Competition	HOC; 1; 20	HOC; 2; 22	HOC; 3; 31	NÜR; 1; 18	NÜR; 2; 23	SIL; 1 DNS	SIL; 2; 20	SPA; 1; 13	SPA; 2; 21	ASS; 1; 24	ASS; 2; 19	MST; 1 Ret	MST; 2 DNS	MST; 3; 25	ZAN; 1; 21	ZAN; 2 Ret	ZAN; 3 C				40th	15

=== Complete BOSS GP results ===
(key) (Races in bold indicate pole position) (Races in italics indicate fastest lap)

Year	Entrant	Class	1	2	3	4	5	6	7	8	9	10	11	12	13	14	15	16	Pos	Points
2014	Inter Europol Competition	Open	**HOC**; **1**; 1	**HOC**; **2**; 12	MUG; 1; 4	MUG; 2; 2	RBR; 1; 5	RBR; 2; 5	MNZ; 1 Ret	MNZ; 2; 3	ZAN; 1; 2	ZAN; 2; 3	BRN; 1; 3	BRN; 2; 3	IMO; 1; 1	**IMO**; **2**; 2	LEC; 1; 2	LEC; 2; 2	1st	276
2015	Inter Europol Competition	Formula	HOC; 1; 2	HOC; 2; 3	LEC; 1; 3	LEC; 2; 3	MNZ; 1; 2	MNZ; 2; 2	**ZOL**; **1**; 1	**ZOL**; **2**; 1	**ASS**; **1**; 1	**ASS**; **2**; 2	BRN; 1; 2	BRN; 2; 2	**DIJ**; **1**; 1	**DIJ**; **2**; 1			2nd	277

=== Complete European Le Mans Series results ===
Year	Team	Class	Car	Engine	1	2	3	4	5	6	Rank	Points
2016	Inter Europol Competition	LMP3	Ligier JS P3	Nissan VK50VE 5.0 L V8	SIL; Ret	IMO; 15	RBR; Ret	LEC; 7	SPA; 6	EST; 5	12th	24.5
2017	Inter Europol Competition	LMP3	Ligier JS P3	Nissan VK50VE 5.0 L V8	SIL; 6	MNZ; 6	RBR; 5	LEC; 2	SPA; 4	ALG; Ret	5th	56
2018	Inter Europol Competition	LMP3	Ligier JS P3	Nissan VK50VE 5.0 L V8	LEC; 6	MNZ; 4	RBR; 3	SIL; 5	SPA; 12	ALG; 1	2nd	70.25
2019	Inter Europol Competition	LMP2	Ligier JS P217	Gibson GK428 4.2 L V8	LEC; 15	MNZ; 13	CAT; Ret	SIL; 14	SPA; 12	ALG; Ret	28th	2
2020	Inter Europol Competition	LMP2	Ligier JS P217	Gibson GK428 4.2 L V8	LEC; 7	SPA; 11	LEC; 6	MNZ; 12	ALG; Ret		16th	15.5
2025	Inter Europol Competition	LMP2	Oreca 07	Gibson GK428 4.2 L V8	CAT; 10	**LEC**; 2	IMO; 2	SPA; 2	SIL; 2	ALG; 2	2nd	92
2026	Inter Europol Competition	LMP2	Oreca 07	Gibson GK428 4.2 L V8	CAT; 5	LEC; 7	IMO; 10	SPA; 1	**SIL**; 10	ALG; 3	5th	59

^{*} Season still in progress.

=== Complete Asian Le Mans Series results ===
(key) (Races in bold indicate pole position) (Races in italics indicate fastest lap)

Year	Team	Class	Car	Engine	1	2	3	4	Pos.	Points
2018–19	Inter Europol Competition	LMP3	Ligier JS P3	Nissan VK50 5.0 L V8	**SHA**; 1	FUJ; 2	BUR; 2	SEP; 1	1st	87
2019–20	Inter Europol Endurance	LMP2	Ligier JS P217	Gibson GK428 4.2 L V8	SHA; 4	BEN; Ret	SEP; 5	BUR; 7	5th	28

=== Complete FIA World Endurance Championship results ===
(key) (Races in bold indicate pole position) (Races in italics indicate fastest lap)

Year	Entrant	Class	Chassis	Engine	1	2	3	4	5	6	7	8	Rank	Points
2018–19	Inter Europol Competition	LMP2	Ligier JS P217	Gibson GK428 4.2 L V8	SPA	LMS	SIL	FUJ	SHA	SEB	SPA	LMS; 16	NC†	0
2019–20	Inter Europol Competition	LMP2	Ligier JS P217	Gibson GK428 4.2 L V8	SIL	FUJ	SHA	BHR	COA	SPA	LMS; Ret	BHR	NC†	0
2021	Inter Europol Competition	LMP2	Oreca 07	Gibson GK428 4.2 L V8	SPA; 5	ALG; 5	MNZ; 4	LMS; 5	BHR; 9	BHR; 5			6th	84
2022	Inter Europol Competition	LMP2	Oreca 07	Gibson GK428 4.2 L V8	SEB; NC	SPA; Ret	LMS; 8	MNZ; 4	FUJ; 11	BHR; NC			15th	20
2023	Inter Europol Competition	LMP2	Oreca 07	Gibson GK428 4.2 L V8	SEB; 3	PRT; 9	SPA; 3	LMS; 1	MNZ; 5	FUJ; 9	BHR; 6		2nd	114

=== Complete 24 Hours of Le Mans results ===
Year	Team	Co-Drivers	Car	Class	Laps	Pos.	Class Pos.
2019	(Poland) Inter Europol Competition	(United Kingdom) Nigel Moore (United Kingdom) James Winslow	Ligier JS P217-Gibson	LMP2	325	45th	16th
2020	(Poland) Inter Europol Competition	(Austria) René Binder (Russia) Matevos Isaakyan	Ligier JS P217-Gibson	LMP2	316	42nd	17th
2021	(Poland) Inter Europol Competition	(United Kingdom) Alex Brundle (Netherlands) Renger van der Zande	Oreca 07-Gibson	LMP2	360	10th	5th
2022	(Poland) Inter Europol Competition	(United Kingdom) Alex Brundle (Mexico) Esteban Gutiérrez	Oreca 07-Gibson	LMP2	360	17th	13th
2023	(Poland) Inter Europol Competition	(Spain) Albert Costa (Switzerland) Fabio Scherer	Oreca 07-Gibson	LMP2	328	9th	**1st**
2024	(Poland) Inter Europol Competition	(Grenada) Vladislav Lomko (Note: Lomko is Russian, but he competes under a Grenadian licence as Russian national emblems were banned by the FIA following the Russian invasion of Ukraine.) (France) Clément Novalak	Oreca 07-Gibson	LMP2	297	16th	**2nd**
2025	(Poland) Inter Europol Competition	(France) Tom Dillmann (United Kingdom) Nick Yelloly	Oreca 07-Gibson	LMP2	367	18th	**1st**
2026	(Poland) Inter Europol Competition	(France) Tom Dillmann (United Kingdom) Nick Yelloly	Oreca 07-Gibson	LMP2	361	15th	**1st**

=== Complete IMSA SportsCar Championship results ===
(key) (Races in bold indicate pole position; races in italics indicate fastest lap)

Year	Entrant	Class	Make	Engine	1	2	3	4	5	6	7	Rank	Points
2020	Inter Europol Competition	LMP2	Oreca 07	Gibson GK428 4.2 L V8	DAY	SEB	ELK	ATL	PET; 3	LGA	SEB; 4	11th	58
2024	Inter Europol by PR1/Mathiasen Motorsports	LMP2	Oreca 07	Gibson GK428 4.2 L V8	DAY; 4	SEB; 6	WGL; 3	MOS	ELK	IMS; 2	ATL; 4	17th	1581
2026	Inter Europol Competition	LMP2	Oreca 07	Gibson GK428 4.2 L V8	DAY; 3	SEB	WGL	MOS	ELK	IMS	PET	27th*	325*

^{†} Points only counted towards the Michelin Endurance Cup, and not the overall LMP2 Championship.
