= Frank Mechaly =

French fashion designer (born 1975)

- Born: May 9, 1975 (age 51); Marseille, France
- Occupation: Fashion designer

Frank Mechaly (born May 9, 1975) is a French jeans designer and brand maker, specializing in premium denim. Though he has successfully launched a number of brands including Sacred Blue. He is known as the founder and creator of 575 DENIM which has been embraced by celebrities such as Cameron Diaz who made a point of publicly acknowledging her affinity for the jeans during an appearance on Saturday Night Live. Mechaly launched Rockstar Original prior in 2008.

== Biography ==
At age 15, Frank quit school and at 16 moved to St. Tropez, where he began to work in retail clothing stores as a sales person. He soon moved on to buying vintage clothing, especially vintage Levis and reselling for a profit. Eventually this developed into the opening of his own vintage store. Every week he took a train to Rouen to purchase several large bagfuls of jeans, military issue shirts and football jerseys, which he then washed, repaired and resold.

== Career ==
=== RockStar Original ===
Frank Mechaly's next project was to launch his new brand "Rockstar".

=== 575 DENIM ===
The first year that 575 DENIM brand launched, it was immensely successful. It was embraced by celebrities and particularly noted when actress Cameron Diaz, who was never paid for any endorsements, actually went to stores requesting to buy 575 DENIM and then wearing them at red carpet events and during her Saturday Night Live appearance. The brand was anticipated to have continued success when towards the end of 2004 they were sued by Levi Strauss & Co.

=== LEVI STRAUSS & Co. vs. Frank Mechaly ===
Levi Strauss filed civil case number C 06 2402 against Frank Mechaly and his Jeanius Corporation because they felt that the 575 DENIM brand was infringing upon their 500 series jeans. Mechaly claimed that he never had any intention of doing that and that the brand was inspired by his birthday, which was on May 9, 1975 (5-75) and that he had simply wanted to stand out by using a number rather than a word or letters like most other brands. Levi Strauss won the case, which resulted in 575 eventually closing and laying off their 300 employees.
