= 2019 GT & Prototype Challenge =

Car racing competition

The 2019 GT & Prototype Challenge was the third series of the GT & Prototype Challenge. The GT and Superlights classes of the Supercar Challenge were split from the original series to form the new championship.

== Regulations ==
The series entrants are divided over four classes. The GT class, from the Supercar Challenge Super GT class, forms the highest and fastest division. Cars with a 2,8 kg per HP or more ratio are allowed to compete. This includes all Group GT3 class cars and specially built GT's such as the Solution F built Volvo S60 and Renault Sport R.S. 01. LMP3 spec cars first raced in the Supercar Challenge Super GT class in 2016. The class forms a separate class within the series open to all 2016 specification LMP3 machinery.

Two classes from the Supercar Challenge Superlights class are included in the new series. The fastest of the two is the Group CN class. Group CN specification cars built after 2014 are allowed to compete. The fourth, and slowest, class is the Radical SR3 class. Mainly a Radical SR3 spec class, the class is open to cars with comparable lap times. Also allowed are the Praga R1 and pre-2014 Group CN class cars.

== Calendar ==
Round	Circuit	Date	Classes	Event	Notes
1	Magny-Cours, France	19–21 April	CN, SR3		All of the present classes race combined.
2	Circuit Zolder, Belgium	31 May-2 June	All	Attic Superprix	All of the present classes race combined.
3	Circuit de Spa-Francorchamps, Belgium	21–23 June	All	Spa Euro Races	All of the present classes race combined.
4	Circuit de Spa-Francorchamps, Belgium	4–6 October	LMP3, SR3	TCR Spa 500	All of the present classes race combined.
5	TT Circuit Assen, Netherlands	18–20 October	All	Racing Festival Spa	All of the present classes race combined.

== Entry list ==
There were no Super GT entries.

Team	Chassis	Engine	No.	Drivers	Rounds
LMP3
(Luxembourg) Prime Racing	Ginetta G57	Chevrolet LS3 6.2L V8	601	(Luxembourg) Jean-Pierre Lequeux	3–4
(Luxembourg) Prime Racing	Ginetta G57	Chevrolet LS3 6.2L V8	601	(Luxembourg) Jean-Marc Ueberecken	3–4
(Germany) EDEKA Aschoff Racing	Ginetta G58	Ginetta Billet Block 6.2L V8	603	(Germany) Max Aschoff	2–5
(Germany) Team Clim Air	Ligier JS P3	Nissan VK50DE 5.0L V8	605	(Switzerland) Pieder Decurtins	3
(Germany) Team Clim Air	Ligier JS P3	Nissan VK50DE 5.0L V8	605	(Germany) Laurents Hörr	2-3
(Luxembourg) DKR Engineering	Norma M30	Nissan VK50DE 5.0L V8	606	(Germany) Laurents Hörr	3 (R2)
(Luxembourg) DKR Engineering	Norma M30	Nissan VK50DE 5.0L V8	606	(Switzerland) Marcello Marateotto	3
(Spain) E2P Escuela Española de Pilotos	Mosler MT900 GT3	Chevrolet LS7 7.0L V8	607	(Spain) Manuel Cintrano	4
(Spain) E2P Escuela Española de Pilotos	Mosler MT900 GT3	Chevrolet LS7 7.0L V8	607	(Spain) Javier Morcillo	4
(Switzerland) T2 Racing	Ligier JS P3	Nissan VK50DE 5.0L V8	657	(Switzerland) Stephen Rupp	3
(Switzerland) T2 Racing	Ligier JS P3	Nissan VK50DE 5.0L V8	657	(France) Vincent Capillaire	3
(Spain) BE Motorsport	Ligier JS P3	Nissan VK50DE 5.0L V8	693	(Spain) Javier Ibran Pardo	4–5
(Spain) BE Motorsport	Ligier JS P3	Nissan VK50DE 5.0L V8	693	(Netherlands) Mathijs Bakker	5
Group CN
(Belgium) Deldiche Racing	Norma M20 FC	Honda K20A 2.0L I4	804	(Belgium) Luc de Cock	2, 5
(Belgium) Deldiche Racing	Norma M20 FC	Honda K20A 2.0L I4	804	(Belgium) Tim Joosen	2, 5
(Belgium) Deldiche Racing	Norma M20 FC	Honda K20A 2.0L I4	805	(Belgium) Tom Boonen	2, 5
(Belgium) Deldiche Racing	Norma M20 FC	Honda K20A 2.0L I4	805	(Belgium) Thomas Piessens	2, 5
(Belgium) Deldiche Racing	Norma M20 FC	Honda K20A 2.0L I4	805	(Belgium) Sam Dejonghe	5
(Belgium) Kraft Racing	Norma M20 FC	Honda K20A 2.0L I4	807	(Belgium) Stienes Longin	3
(Belgium) Kraft Racing	Norma M20 FC	Honda K20A 2.0L I4	807	(France) Evan Meunier	3
(Belgium) Kraft Racing	Norma M20 FC	Honda K20A 2.0L I4	809	(Belgium) Tim Verbergt	3
(Belgium) Kraft Racing	Norma M20 FC	Honda K20A 2.0L I4	809	(Belgium) Tom Boonen	3
(Belgium) McDonald's Racing	Norma M20 FC	Honda K20A 2.0L I4	822	(Belgium) François Bouillon	2
(Belgium) McDonald's Racing	Norma M20 FC	Honda K20A 2.0L I4	822	(Belgium) Marco Oppens	2 (R1)
(Belgium) McDonald's Racing	Norma M20 FC	Honda K20A 2.0L I4	822	(Netherlands) Koen de Wit	2 (R2)
(United Kingdom) Neil Primrose Racing	Norma M20 FC	Honda K20A 2.0L I4	844	(United Kingdom) Neil Primrose	1, 3
(United Kingdom) Neil Primrose Racing	Norma M20 FC	Honda K20A 2.0L I4	844	(United Kingdom) Sam Allpass	3
SR3 - Praga
(United Kingdom) BS Racing by Baticonsult	Radical SR3 RSX	Suzuki RPE 1.5L I4	406	(Luxembourg) Alain Berg	All
(France) BS Racing by Roke Racing	Radical SR3RS	Suzuki RPE 1.5L I4	901	(France) Hector Gouraud	All
(France) BS Racing by Roke Racing	Radical SR3RS	Suzuki RPE 1.5L I4	901	(France) Antoine Mattéo	All

== Race results ==
Round		Circuit	LMP3 Winning Car	Group CN Winning Car	SR3 Winning Car
Round		Circuit	LMP3 Winning Drivers	Group CN Winning Drivers	SR3 Winning Drivers
1	R1	(France) Magny-Cours	None	(United Kingdom) Neil Primrose Racing	(France) No. 901 BS Racing by Roke Racing
1	R1	(France) Magny-Cours	None	(United Kingdom) Neil Primrose	(France) Hector Gouraud (France) Antoine Mattéo
1	R2	(France) Magny-Cours	None	(United Kingdom) No. 844 Neil Primrose Racing	(United Kingdom) No. 406 BS Racing by Baticonsult
1	R2	(France) Magny-Cours	None	(United Kingdom) Neil Primrose	(Luxembourg) Alain Berg
2	R1	(Belgium) Zolder	(Germany) No. 605 Team Clim Air	(Belgium) No. 804 Deldiche Racing	(United Kingdom) No. 406 BS Racing by Baticonsult
2	R1	(Belgium) Zolder	(Germany) Laurents Hörr	(Belgium) Luc de Cock (Belgium) Tim Joosen	(Luxembourg) Alain Berg
2	R2	(Belgium) Zolder	(Germany) No. 605 Team Clim Air	(Belgium) No. 804 Deldiche Racing	(United Kingdom) No. 406 BS Racing by Baticonsult
2	R2	(Belgium) Zolder	(Germany) Laurents Hörr	(Belgium) Luc de Cock (Belgium) Tim Joosen	(Luxembourg) Alain Berg
3	R1	(Belgium) Spa-Francorchamps	(Germany) No. 603 EDEKA Aschoff Racing	(Belgium) No. 809 Kraft Racing	(United Kingdom) No. 406 BS Racing by Baticonsult
3	R1	(Belgium) Spa-Francorchamps	(Germany) Max Aschoff	(Belgium) Tom Boonen (Belgium) Tim Verbergt	(Luxembourg) Alain Berg
3	R2	(Belgium) Spa-Francorchamps	(Luxembourg) No. 605 DKR Engineering	(Belgium) No. 807 Kraft Racing	(United Kingdom) No. 406 BS Racing by Baticonsult
3	R2	(Belgium) Spa-Francorchamps	(Switzerland) Marcello Marateotto (Germany) Laurents Hörr	(Belgium) Stienes Longin (France) Evan Meunier	(Luxembourg) Alain Berg
4	R1	(Belgium) Spa-Francorchamps	(Germany) No. 603 EDEKA Aschoff Racing	None	(United Kingdom) No. 406 BS Racing by Baticonsult
4	R1	(Belgium) Spa-Francorchamps	(Germany) Max Aschoff	None	(Luxembourg) Alain Berg
4	R2	(Belgium) Spa-Francorchamps	(Spain) No. 607 E2P Escuela Española de Pilotos	None	(United Kingdom) No. 406 BS Racing by Baticonsult
4	R2	(Belgium) Spa-Francorchamps	(Spain) Manuel Cintrano (Spain) Javier Morcillo	None	(Luxembourg) Alain Berg
5	R1	(Netherlands) Assen	(Germany) No. 603 EDEKA Aschoff Racing	(Belgium) No. 805 Deldiche Racing	(United Kingdom) No. 406 BS Racing by Baticonsult
5	R1	(Netherlands) Assen	(Germany) Max Aschoff	(Belgium) Tom Boonen (Belgium) Thomas Piessens (Belgium) Sam Dejonghe	(Luxembourg) Alain Berg
5	R2	(Netherlands) Assen	(Germany) No. 603 EDEKA Aschoff Racing	(Belgium) No. 804 Deldiche Racing	(United Kingdom) No. 406 BS Racing by Baticonsult
5	R2	(Netherlands) Assen	(Germany) Max Aschoff	(Belgium) Luc de Cock (Belgium) Tim Joosen	(Luxembourg) Alain Berg

=== Drivers' championships ===
Position	**1st**	**2nd**	**3rd**	**4th**	**5th**	**6th**	**7th**	**8th**	**9th**	**10th**	**11th**	**Pole**
Points	23	20	17	15	13	11	9	7	5	3	1	1

Pos.	Driver	Team	MAG (France)		ZOL (Belgium)		SPA1 (Belgium)		SPA2 (Belgium)		ASS (Netherlands)		Points
LMP3
1	(Germany) Max Aschoff	(Germany) EDEKA Aschoff Racing			**Ret**	Ret	1	4	**1**	Ret	**3**	1	110
2	(Germany) Laurents Hörr	(Germany) Team Clim Air			2	2	2						89
2	(Germany) Laurents Hörr	(Luxembourg) DKR Engineering						1					89
3	(Spain) Javier Ibran Pardo	(Spain) BE Motorsport							41	Ret	4	4	55
4	(Luxembourg) Jean-Marc Ueberecken (Luxembourg) Jean-Pierre Lequeux	(Luxembourg) Prime Racing					5	2	26	Ret			50
5	(Spain) Manuel Cintrano (Spain) Javier Morcillo	(Spain) E2P Escuela Española de Pilotos							17	9			43
6	(Netherlands) Matthijs Bakker	(Spain) BE Motorsport									4	4	40
7	(Switzerland) Marcello Marateotto	(Luxembourg) DKR Engineering					3	1					40
8	(Switzerland) Stephan Rupp (France) Vincent Capillaire	(Switzerland) T2 Racing					4	3					33
9	(Switzerland) Pieder Decurtins	(Germany) Team Clim Air					2	7					33
Group CN
1	(Belgium) Tom Boonen	(Belgium) Deldiche Racing			3	3					**1**	3	127
1	(Belgium) Tom Boonen	(Belgium) Kraft Racing					6	6					127
2	(Belgium) Luc de Cock (Belgium) Tim Joosen	(Belgium) Deldiche Racing			**1**	1					2	2	90
3	(Belgium) Thomas Piessens	(Belgium) Deldiche Racing			3	3					**1**	3	84
4	(United Kingdom) Neil Primrose	(United Kingdom) Neil Primrose Racing	**5**	1			11	8					81
5	(Belgium) Stienes Longin (France) Evan Meunier	(Belgium) Kraft Racing					**7**	1					44
6	(Belgium) Sam Dejonghe	(Belgium) Deldiche Racing									**1**	3	44
7	(Belgium) Tim Verbergt	(Belgium) Kraft Racing					6	6					43
8	(United Kingdom) Sam Allpass	(United Kingdom) Neil Primrose Racing					11	8					34
9	(Belgium) François Bouillon	(Belgium) McDonald's Racing			Ret	4							17
9	(Belgium) Marco Oppens	(Belgium) McDonald's Racing			Ret								17
9	(Netherlands) Koen de Wit	(Belgium) McDonald's Racing				4							17
SR3
1	(Luxembourg) Alain Berg	(United Kingdom) BS Racing by Baticonsult	**Ret**	11	**7**	9	**19**	13	**19**	11	**9**	8	212
2	(France) Hector Gouraud (France) Antoine Mattéo	(France) BS Racing by Roke Racing	11	12	10	10	28	21	37	32	11	12	203
Pos.	Driver	Team	MAG (France)		ZOL (Belgium)		SPA1 (Belgium)		SPA2 (Belgium)		ASS2 (Netherlands)		Points

Key
Colour	Result
Gold	Winner
Silver	Second place
Bronze	Third place
Green	Other points position
Blue	Other classified position
Blue	Not classified, finished (NC)
Purple	Not classified, retired (Ret)
Red	Did not qualify (DNQ)
Red	Did not pre-qualify (DNPQ)
Black	Disqualified (DSQ)
White	Did not start (DNS)
White	Race cancelled (C)
Blank	Did not practice (DNP)
Blank	Excluded (EX)
Blank	Did not arrive (DNA)
Blank	Withdrawn (WD)
Blank	Did not enter (cell empty)
Text formatting	Meaning
**Bold**	Pole position
Italics	Fastest lap
