= 2021 Masters Endurance Legends USA =

The 2021 Masters Endurance Legends USA was the third season of the Masters Endurance Legends USA. It began at Sebring International Raceway 12 March and ended at Sonoma Raceway on 17 October.

== Cars and Drivers ==
Chassis	Engine	No.	Driver	Class	Rounds	Notes
Proto
Ligier JS P3	Nissan VK50VE 5.0 L Turbo V8	06	(United States) Aristotle Balogh	P2	1	Ex-Jr III Racing
Coyote Corvette DP	Chevrolet 5.0 L V8	09	(United States) Eric Curran	P2	5–6	Visit Florida livery
Coyote Corvette DP	Chevrolet 5.0 L V8	09	(United States) William Hubbell	P2	5–6	Visit Florida livery
Coyote Corvette DP	Chevrolet 5.0 L V8	90	(United States) Dante Tornello	P4	1	Visit Florida livery
Coyote Corvette DP	Chevrolet 5.0 L V8	90	(United States) Robert Tornello	P4	1	Visit Florida livery
Coyote Corvette DP	Chevrolet 5.0 L V8	90	(United States) Robert Tornello	P2	3–4	Visit Florida livery
Coyote Corvette DP	Chevrolet 5.0 L V8	90	(United States) Dante Tornello	P2	3, 5–6	Visit Florida livery
Coyote Corvette DP	Chevrolet 5.0 L V8	230	(United States) William Hubbell	P2	3	Visit Florida livery
Coyote Corvette DP	Chevrolet 5.0 L V8	230	(United States) Eric Curran	P2	3 (R1)	Visit Florida livery
Audi R8	Audi 3.6 L V8	2	(United States) Travis Engen	P4	1, 3–6	
Audi R8	Audi 3.6 L V8	61	(United States) Larry Connor	P4	4	
Riley & Scott Mk III	Chevrolet 5.0 L V8	3	(United States) Chris Liebenberg	P4	6	Ex-Matthews-Colucci Racing, Roush Racing livery
Peugeot 908 HDi FAP	Peugeot HDi 5.5 L Turbo V12	7	(United States) David Porter	P4	1, 3–4	
Oreca 03	Nissan VK45DE 4.5 L V8	8	(Republic of Ireland) Tommy Byrne	P3	3	
Oreca 03	Nissan VK45DE 4.5 L V8	8	(United Kingdom) James Hagan	P3	3	
Oreca 03	Nissan VK45DE 4.5 L V8	8	(United Kingdom) Gregory Thornton	P3	4	
Élan DP02	Mazda MZR-R 2.3 L Turbo I4	68	(United Kingdom) Gregory Thornton	P2	1	
Riley Mk XI	Pontiac 4.6 L V8	10	(United States) John McKenna	P2	2, 4–6	ex-SunTrust Racing
Riley Mk XI	Pontiac 4.6 L V8	10	(United States) Ethan Shippert	P2	4	ex-SunTrust Racing
Riley Mk XI	Pontiac 4.6 L V8	10	(United States) Ross Thompson	P2	5–6	ex-SunTrust Racing
Chevrolet Dallara DP	Chevrolet 5.0 L V8	10	(United States) Kurt Schultz	P4	3	Ex-Wayne Taylor Racing, Velocity Worldwide livery
HPD ARX-03b	Honda 2.8 L Turbo V6	11	(United States) Robert Blain	P4	1	Ex-Extreme Speed Motorsports
HPD ARX-03b	Honda 2.8 L Turbo V6	11	(United Kingdom) Jamie Constable	P4	1	Ex-Extreme Speed Motorsports
HPD ARX-03b	Honda 2.8 L Turbo V6	11	(United States) Robert Blain	P3	3–4	Ex-Extreme Speed Motorsports
HPD ARX-03b	Honda 2.8 L Turbo V6	22	(United Kingdom) Jamie Constable	P3	1	
HPD ARX-03b	Honda 2.8 L Turbo V6	22	(Brazil) Roberto Moreno	P3	1 (R1)	
HPD ARX-03b	Honda 2.8 L Turbo V6	22	(United States) Robert Blain	P3	1 (R2)	
Riley Mk XI	Pontiac 5.0 L V8	15	(United States) Spencer Trenery	P2	2, 5–6	ex-SunTrust Racing
Riley Mk XI	Pontiac LS6 3.5 L V8	23	(United States) Ernie Spada	P2	2, 5–6	Ruby Tuesday Racing Team livery
Riley Mk XI	Pontiac LS6 3.5 L V8	23	(United States) Wade Carter	P2	5	Ruby Tuesday Racing Team livery
Crawford DP08	Porsche 3.6 L Flat-6	23	(United States) Wally Owens	P2	4	Ruby Tuesday Racing Team livery
Crawford DP08	Porsche 3.6 L Flat-6	123	(United States) Wally Owens	P2	3, 5–6	Ruby Tuesday Racing Team livery
Morgan LMP2	Nissan VK45DE 5.0 L V8	24	(United States) Stephen Romak	P3	2, 5	
Ligier JS P3	Nissan VK50VE 5.0 L Turbo V8	24	(United States) Francesco Melandri	P1	3	
Ligier JS P3	Nissan VK50VE 5.0 L Turbo V8	42	(United Kingdom) Nigel Greensall	P2	1	
Ligier JS P3	Nissan VK50VE 5.0 L Turbo V8	42	(United States) Francesco Melandri	P2	1	
Oreca FLM09	Chevrolet LS3 6.2 L V8	25	(United States) Rick Carlino	P3	3	
Oreca FLM09	Chevrolet LS3 6.2 L V8	25	(United States) Dave Handy	P3	3	
Oreca FLM09	Chevrolet LS3 6.2 L V8	25	(United States) Rick Carlino	P2	4	
Oreca FLM09	Chevrolet LS3 6.2 L V8	25	(United States) Dave Handy	P2	4	
Spice SE87	Ford Cosworth DFL 4.5 L V8	29	(United States) Cal Meeker	PHI	2, 4, 7	
Lola B12/80	Judd 5.0 L V8	30	(United States) Craig Bennett	P4	4	Ex-Status Grand Prix
Coyote Corvette DP	Chevrolet 5.5 L V8	33	(United States) John Reisman	P2	3	Ex-Action Express Racing, Whelen livery
Oreca 03	Judd 3.6 L V8	34	(United States) Danny Baker	P3	4–6	Ex-Race Performance
Oreca 03	Judd 3.6 L V8	40	(United States) Danny Baker	P3	3	Ex-Race Performance
Oreca 03	Nissan VK45DE 4.5 L V8	40	(Canada) Keith Freiser	P3	4, 6	Ex-Boutsen Ginion Racing
Jaguar XJR-5	Jaguar 6.0 L V12	44	(United States) Paet Hidalgo	PHI	7	
Jaguar XJR-5	Jaguar 6.0 L V12	44	(United States) Bruce Marquand	PHI	7	
Ginetta G57 P2	Chevrolet LS3 6.2 L V8	46	(United States) Charles Persico	P1	7	
Oreca 03	Nissan VK45DE 4.5 L V8	48	(United States) Joel Quadracci	P3	4	Ex-Murphy Prototypes
Oreca FLM09	Chevrolet LS3 6.2 L V8	54	(United States) Dominick Incantalupo	P3	3	Ex-CORE Autosport
Picchio MB1	BMW 3.0 L I6	57	(United States) Tim Barber	P3	6	Martini Racing livery
Picchio MB1	BMW 3.0 L I6	57	(United States) Art Hebert	P3	6	Martini Racing livery
Picchio MB1	BMW 3.0 L I6	57	(United States) Andrew Wait	P3	6	Martini Racing livery
Autoexe LMP-02	Mazda R26B 2.6 L 4-Rotor	64	(United States) Charles Nearburg	P3	2	
Ginetta-Juno P3-15	Nissan VK50 5.0 L V8	67	(United States) John Cahalin	P1	7	
Ginetta-Juno P3-15	Nissan VK50 5.0 L V8	69	(United Kingdom) Marcus Jewell	P1	7	
Ginetta-Juno P3-15	Nissan VK50 5.0 L V8	69	(United Kingdom) Ron Maydon	P1	7	
Riley & Scott Mk III	Chevrolet 6.0 L V8	88	(United States) Wade Carter	P4	6	
Riley & Scott Mk XI	Chevrolet 4.6 L V8	95	(Mexico) Octavio Rincon	P2	7	
Norma M30	Nissan VK50VE 5.0 L Turbo V8	100	(United States) Joe Robillard	P2	1	Ex-IPC
Panoz LMP-1 Roadster-S	Élan 6L8 6.0 L V8	112	(United States) George Krass	P4	6	
Oreca FLM09	Chevrolet LS3 6.2 L V8	154	(United States) Chris Ronson, Jr	P3	3	
Oreca FLM09	Chevrolet LS3 6.2 L V8	154	(United States) Chris Ronson, Sr	P3	3	
GT1
Chevrolet Corvette C7.R	Chevrolet LT5.5 5.5 L V8	3	(United States) Tom Mueller	GT1-3	7	
Chevrolet Corvette C6.R	Chevrolet 7.0 L V8	4	(United States) Charles Nearburg	GT1-3	5	
Porsche 997 GT3 Cup	Porsche 4.0 L Flat-6	145	(United States) David Alvarado	GT1-3	2	Flying Lizard Motorsports livery
GT2
Porsche 996 GT3 RSR	Porsche 3.8 L Flat-6	45	(United States) Loren Beggs	GT2-2	2, 4, 6–7	Flying Lizard Motorsports livery
BMW M3 GT2	BMW 4.0 L V8	55	(United States) Bill Auberlen	GT2-3	6	Ex-BMW Motorsport
BMW M3 GT2	BMW 4.0 L V8	55	(United States) Travis Okulski	GT2-3	6	Ex-BMW Motorsport
BMW M3 GT2	BMW 4.0 L V8	56	(United States) Connor De Phillippi	GT2-3	5–6	
BMW M3 GT2	BMW 4.0 L V8	56	(United States) Thomas Plucinsky	GT2-3	5–6	
Porsche 911 GT2	Porsche 3.6 L Turbo Flat-6	60	(United States) Carlos de Quesada	GT2-2	1	
Porsche 996 GT3 RSR	Porsche 3.8 L Flat-6	901	(United States) Carlos de Quesada	GT2-2	6	Ex-White Lightning Racing
Porsche 911 GT3-RS	Porsche 3.6 L Flat-6	81	(United States) Douglas Baron	GT2-2	5–7	
Ferrari 458 GT2	Ferrari 4.5 L V8	126	(Canada) Tony Ferraro	GT2-3	6	Ex-Extreme Speed Motorsports
BMW M3 E46	BMW 3.2 L I6	222	(United States) John Edwards	GT2-2	6	
GT3
BMW M3 E36	BMW 3.4 L I6	1	(United States) Scooter Gabel	GT3-1	1, 3, 6	Ex-Prototype Technology Group
BMW M3 E36	BMW 3.4 L I6	1	(United States) Carlos de Quesada	GT3-1	1 (R2)	Ex-Prototype Technology Group
Audi R8 LMS	Audi 5.2 L V10	12	(United States) David Roberts	GT3-3	3–6	
Audi R8 LMS	Audi 5.2 L V10	12	(United States) Mike Skeen	GT3-3	3	
Audi R8 LMS	Audi 5.2 L V10	12	(United States) George Calfo	GT3-3	6	
Porsche 997 GT3 R	Porsche 4.0 L Flat-6	14	(United States) Alexander Marmureanu	GT3-3	7	
Porsche 996 GT3 RSR	Porsche 3.6 L Flat-6	19	(United States) Theo Ruijgh	GT3-1	1	
Porsche 993 RSR	Porsche 3.8 L Turbo Flat-6	21	(United States) Michael Sweeney	GT3-1	5–6	
Porsche 993 RSR	Porsche 3.8 L Turbo Flat-6	21	(United States) Nelson Calle	GT3-1	6	
Audi R8 LMS	Audi 5.5 L V10	26	(United States) Bruce Leeson	GT3-2	2	
Audi R8 LMS	Audi 5.5 L V10	26	(United States) Bruce Leeson	GT3-3	3–4, 7	
Porsche 911	Porsche 3.0 L Flat-6	33	(United States) Pete Rogal	GT3-1	7	
Porsche 996 GT3 Cup	Porsche 3.6 L Flat-6	43	(United States) Andrew Fox	GT3-1	6	
Ford GT GT3	Ford 5.0 L V8	44	(United States) Michael Lange	GT3-2	3	
Porsche 997 RSR	Porsche 3.6 L Flat-6	65	(United States) Don Ondrejcak	GT3-2	3–4	Ex-TRG
Porsche 996 GT3 R	Porsche 3.6 L Flat-6	67	(United States) Matt Johnson	GT3-1	6	
Porsche 997 GT3 R	Porsche 4.0 L Flat-6	85	(United States) Robert Dalrymple	GT3-3	6	
Porsche 911 GT3-RS	Porsche 3.6 L Flat-6	93	(United States) Christopher Frank	GT3-1	7	
Dodge Viper	Viper 8.4 L V10	111	(United States) Edward Hugo	GT3-2	2, 7	
Porsche 911 GT3 R	Porsche 4.0 L Flat-6	134	(United States) Robert van Zelst	GT3-3	4	
Porsche 997 GT3 Cup	Porsche 4.0 L Flat-6	145	(United States) David Alvarado	GT3-3	5–6	Flying Lizard Motorsports livery
Porsche 911 GT3 R	Porsche 4.0 L Flat-6	911	(United States) Douglas Baron	GT3-3	2, 4	
Invitational
Radical SR3	Suzuki RPE 1.2 L I4	17	(Australia) Philip Lewis		3	

Icon	Class
PHI	Proto Historic Class
P1	Proto 1 Class
P2	Proto 2 Class
P3	Proto 3 Class
P4	Proto 4 Class
GT1-1	GT1-1 Class
GT1-2	GT1-2 Class
GT1-3	GT1-3 Class
GT2-1	GT2-1 Class
GT2-2	GT2-2 Class
GT2-3	GT2-3 Class
GT3-1	GT3-1 Class
GT3-2	GT3-2 Class
GT3-3	GT3-3 Class

== Race results ==
Bold indicates overall winner.

Round		Race	Circuit	Date	Pole position	Fastest lap	Proto Winners	GT Winners
1	R1	Sebring Sportscar Week	(Florida) Sebring International Raceway	13 March	(United States) David Porter	(United States) David Porter	P2: (United States) Joe Robillard; P3: (United Kingdom) Jamie Constable; P3: (Brazil) Roberto Moreno; **P4: (United States) David Porter**	GT2-2: (United States) Carlos de Quesada; GT3-1: (United States) Scooter Gabel
1	R2	Sebring Sportscar Week	(Florida) Sebring International Raceway	13 March		(United States) David Porter	P2: (United States) Joe Robillard; P3: (United States) Robert Blain; P3: (United Kingdom) Jamie Constable; **P4: (United States) David Porter**	GT2-2: No starters GT3-1: (United Kingdom) Scooter Gabel; GT3-1: (United States) Carlos de Quesada
2	R3	Masters Speed Festival	(California) Laguna Seca Raceway	16 May	(United States) Spencer Trenery	(United States) Spencer Trenery	PHI: (United States) Cal Meeker; P2: (United States) Spencer Trenery; P3: (United States) Stephen Romak	GT1-3: No finishers GT2-2: (United States) Loren Beggs; GT3-2: (United States) Edward Hugo; GT3-3: (United States) Douglas Baron
2	R4	Masters Speed Festival	(California) Laguna Seca Raceway	16 May		(United States) Spencer Trenery	PHI: (United States) Cal Meeker; P2: (United States) Spencer Trenery; P3: No starters	GT1-3: (United States) David Alvarado; GT2-2: (United States) Loren Beggs; GT3-2: (United States) Edward Hugo; GT3-3: (United States) Douglas Baron
3	R5	Masters & HSR Race Weekend	(New York (state)) Watkins Glen International	10 July	(United States) David Porter	(United States) David Porter	P1: (United States) Francesco Melandri; P2: (United States) John Reisman; P3: (Republic of Ireland) Tommy Byrne; P3: (United Kingdom) James Hagan; **P4: (United States) David Porter**	GT3-1: (United States) Scooter Gabel; GT3-2: (United States) Michael Lange; GT3-3: (United States) David Roberts; GT3-3: (United States) Mike Skeen
3	R6	Masters & HSR Race Weekend	(New York (state)) Watkins Glen International	11 July	(United States) David Porter	(United States) David Porter	P1: (United States) Francesco Melandri; P2: (United States) John Reisman; P3: (Republic of Ireland) Tommy Byrne; P3: (United Kingdom) James Hagan; **P4: (United States) David Porter**	GT3-1: (United States) Scooter Gabel; GT3-2: (United States) Michael Lange; GT3-3: (United States) David Roberts; GT3-3: (United States) Mike Skeen
4	R7	The WeatherTech International Challenge	(Wisconsin) Road America	17 July	(United States) David Porter	(United States) Craig Bennett	PHI: No finishers P2: (United States) John McKenna; P2: (United States) Ed Shippert; **P3: (United States) Joel Quadracci**; P4: (United States) Travis Engen	GT2-2: (United States) Loren Beggs; GT3-2: No finishers GT3-3: (United States) Robert van Zelst
4	R8	The WeatherTech International Challenge	(Wisconsin) Road America	18 July	(United States) Craig Bennett	(United States) David Porter	PHI: (United States) Cal Meeker; P2: (United States) Robert Tornello; P3: (United States) Joel Quadracci; **P4: (United States) David Porter**	GT2-2: (United States) Loren Beggs; GT3-2: No starters GT3-3: (United States) Robert van Zelst
5	R9	Monterey Pre-Reunion	(California) Laguna Seca Raceway	7 August	(United States) Stephen Romak	(United States) Spencer Trenery	P2: (United States) Eric Curran; P2: (United States) William Hubbell; **P3: (United States) Stephen Romak**; P4: (United States) Travis Engen	GT1-3: (United States) Charles Nearburg; GT2-2: (United States) Douglas Baron; GT2-3: (United States) Connor De Phillippi; GT2-3: (United States) Thomas Plucinsky; GT3-1: (United States) Michael Sweeney; GT3-3: (United States) David Roberts
5	R10	Monterey Pre-Reunion	(California) Laguna Seca Raceway	8 August		(United States) Stephen Romak	P2: (United States) Spencer Trenery; **P3: (United States) Stephen Romak**; P4: (United States) Travis Engen	GT1-3: No starters GT2-2: (United States) Douglas Baron; GT2-3: (United States) Connor De Phillippi; GT2-3: (United States) Thomas Plucinsky; GT3-1: (United States) Michael Sweeney; GT3-3: (United States) David Alvardo
6	R11	Rolex Monterey Motorsports Reunion	(California) Laguna Seca Raceway	15 August	(United States) Spencer Trenery	(United States) Eric Curran (United States) William Hubbell	**P2: (United States) Spencer Trenery**; P3: (Canada) Keith Freiser; P4: (United States) Wade Carter	GT2-2: (United States) John Edwards; GT2-3: (United States) Bill Auberlen; GT2-3: (United States) Travis Okulski; GT3-1: (United States) Scooter Gabel; GT3-3: (United States) Robert Dalrymple
6	R12	Rolex Monterey Motorsports Reunion	(California) Laguna Seca Raceway	15 August		(United States) Spencer Trenery	**P2: (United States) Spencer Trenery**; P3: (United States) Danny Baker; P4: (United States) Wade Carter	GT2-2: (United States) John Edwards; GT2-3: (United States) Connor De Phillippi; GT2-3: (United States) Thomas Plucinsky; GT3-1: (United States) Scooter Gabel; GT3-3: (United States) George Calfo; GT3-3: (United States) David Roberts
7	R13	Yokohama Drivers' Cup USA	(California) Sonoma Raceway	15–17 October	(United States) Cal Meeker	(United States) Cal Meeker	PHI: (United States) Cal Meeker; **P1: (United States) Charles Persico**; P2: (Mexico) Octavio Rincon	GT1-3: (United States) Tom Mueller; GT2-2: (United States) Douglas Baron; GT3-1: (United States) Christopher Frank; GT3-2: (United States) Edward Hugo; GT3-3: (United States) Bruce Leeson
7	R14	Yokohama Drivers' Cup USA	(California) Sonoma Raceway	15–17 October		(United States) Cal Meeker	PHI: No finishers **P1: (United States) Charles Persico**; P2: (Mexico) Octavio Rincon	GT1-3: (United States) Tom Mueller; GT2-2: (United States) Douglas Baron; GT3-1: (United States) Christopher Frank; GT3-2: (United States) Edward Hugo; GT3-3: (United States) Alexander Marmureanu

=== Championships standings ===
Starters	Position	**1st**	**2nd**	**3rd**	**4th**	**5th**	**6th**	**Fastest Lap**
3+	Points	9	6	4	3	2	1	1
2	Points	6	4					1
1	Points	4						1

Pos.	Driver	No	Chassis	(Florida) SEB1		(California) LGA1		(New York (state)) WGL		(Wisconsin) ELK		(California) LGA2		(California) LGA3		(California) SON		Points
Proto Historic Class
1	(United States) Cal Meeker	29	Spice SE87			**3**	2			**Ret**	8					**5**	Ret	22
	(United States) Paet Hidalgo (United States) Bruce Marquand	44	Jaguar XJR-5													DNS	DNS	0
Proto 1 Class
1	(United States) Franceso Melandri	24	Ligier JS P3					**7**	**6**									10
2	(United States) Charles Persico	46	Ginetta G57 P2													**1**	1	17
3	(United Kingdom) Marcus Jewell (United Kingdom) Ron Maydon	69	Ginetta-Juno P3-15													2	9	10
4	(United States) John Cahalin	67	Ginetta-Juno P3-15													4	DNS	4
Proto 2 Class
1	(United States) Spencer Trenery	15	Riley Mk XI			**1**	1					**Ret**	**2**	**1**	1			50
2	(United States) William Hubbell	230	Coyote Corvette DP					9	7									36
2	(United States) William Hubbell	09	Coyote Corvette DP									4	4	4	4			36
3	(United States) Eric Curran	230	Coyote Corvette DP					9										32
3	(United States) Eric Curran	09	Coyote Corvette DP									4	4	4	4			32
4	(United States) Robert Tornello	90	Coyote Corvette DP					5	5	**11**	**9**							26
5	(United States) John McKenna	10	Riley Mk XI			8	3			8	DNS	DNS	DNS	6	DNS			24
6	(United States) Dante Tornello	90	Coyote Corvette DP					8	5			14	DNS	12	5			22
7	(United States) John Reisman	33	Coyote Corvette DP					**2**	**2**									20
8	(United States) Joe Robillard	100	Norma M30	3	3													18
9	(United States) Ernie Spada	23	Riley Mk XI			6	7					10	DNS	DNS	DNS			16
10	(United States) Ethan Shippert	10	Riley Mk XI							8	DNS	DNS	DNS	6	DNS			14
11	(United Kingdom) Nigel Greensall (United States) Franceso Melandri	42	Ligier JS P3	**4**	4													14
12	(United States) Wally Owens	123	Crawford DP08					DNS	DNS			13	11	21	16			13
12	(United States) Wally Owens	23	Crawford DP08							DNS	DNS							13
13	(Mexico) Octavio Rincon	95	Riley & Scott Mk XI													**7**	7	10
14	(United States) Wade Carter	23	Riley Mk XI									10	DNS					6
15	(United States) Aristotle Balogh	06	Ligier JS P3	5	DNS													4
16	(United Kingdom) Gregory Thornton	68	Élan DP02	6	Ret													3
17	(United States) Kurt Schultz	10	Coyote Corvette DP					16	Ret									3
	(United States) Rick Carlino (United States) Dave Handy	25	Oreca FLM09							Ret	DNS							0
Proto 3 Class
1	(United States) Danny Baker	40	Oreca 03					6	**8**									43
1	(United States) Danny Baker	34	Oreca 03							6	5	3	3	**3**	2			43
2	(Canada) Keith Freiser	20	Oreca 03							3	6			2	6			26
3	(United States) Stephen Romak	24	Morgan LMP2			2	DNS					**1**	1					20
4	(United States) Joel Quadracci	48	Oreca 03							**1**	**3**							20
5	(Republic of Ireland) Tommy Byrne (United Kingdom) James Hagan	8	Oreca 03					**3**	3									20
6	(United Kingdom) Jamie Constable	22	HPD ARX-03b	**10**	5													10
7	(United States) Chris Ronson, Jr (United States) Chris Ronson, Sr	154	Oreca FLM09					4	9									10
8	(United States) Tim Barber (United States) Art Herbert (United States) Tim Barber	57	Picchio MB1											17	12			8
9	(United States) Robert Blain	22	HPD ARX-03b		5													7
9	(United States) Robert Blain	11	HPD ARX-03b					Ret	DNS	12	Ret							7
10	(United States) Dominick Incantalupo	54	Oreca FLM09					10	10									6
11	(Brazil) Roberto Moreno	22	HPD ARX-03b	**10**														5
12	(United Kingdom) Gregory Thornton	8	Oreca 03							5	Ret							4
	(United States) Rick Carlino (United States) Dave Handy	25	Oreca FLM09					Ret	Ret									0
	(United States) Charles Nearburg	64	Autoexe LMP-02			Ret	DNS											0
Proto 4 Class
1	(United States) Travis Engen	2	Audi R8	2	2			5	4	2	4	**2**	5	7	7			56
2	(United States) David Porter	7	Peugeot 908 HDi FAP	**1**	1			**1**	**1**	**4**	1							48
3	(United States) Wade Carter	88	Riley & Scott Mk III											**5**	3			17
4	(United States) Craig Bennett	33	Lola B12/80							Ret	**2**							7
5	(United States) George Krass	112	Panoz LMP-1 Roadster-S											DNS	12			4
	(United States) Dante Tornello (United States) Robert Tornello	90	Coyote Corvette DP	Ret	DNS													0
	(United States) Robert Blain (United Kingdom) Jamie Constable	11	HPD ARX-03b	DNS	DNS													0
	(United States) Larry Connor	61	Audi R8							DNS	DNS							0
	(United States) Chris Liebenberg	3	Riley & Scott Mk III											DNS	DNS			0
GT1-3 Class
1	(United States) Tom Mueller	3	Chevrolet Corvette C7.R													**3**	3	10
2	(United States) David Alvardo	145	Porsche 997 GT3 Cup			**Ret**	6											6
3	(United States) Charles Nearburg	4	Chevrolet Corvette C6.R									**5**	DNS					5
GT2-2 Class
1	(United States) Loren Beggs	45	Porsche 911 GT3-RS			**4**	4			**9**	**11**			11	10	DNS	DNS	32
2	(United States) Douglas Baron	81	Porsche 911 GT3-RS									**8**	9	15	20	**6**	5	27
3	(United States) John Edwards	222	BMW M3 E46											**8**	9			20
4	(United States) Carlos de Quesada	60	Porsche 911 GT2	**8**	DNS													9
4	(United States) Carlos de Quesada	901	Porsche 996 GT3 RSR											14	DNS			9
GT2-3 Class
1	(United States) Connor De Phillippi (United States) Thomas Plucinsky	56	BMW M3 GT2									**6**	6	**10**	8			27
2	(Canada) Tony Ferraro	126	Ferrari 458 GT2											18	13			10
3	(United States) Bill Auberlen (United States) Travis Okulski	55	BMW M3 GT2											9	Ret			9
GT3-1 Class
1	(United States) Scooter Gabel	1	BMW M3 E36	**7**	6			**11**	**12**					**13**	14			40
2	(United States) Michael Sweeney	21	Porsche 993 RSR									**6**	10	21	17			20
3	(United States) Christopher Frank	93	Porsche 911 GT3-RS													**6**	8	10
4	(United States) Bruce Johnson	67	Porsche 996 GT3 R											22	18			10
5	(United States) Nelson Calle	21	Porsche 993 RSR											21	17			10
6	(United States) Andrew Fox	43	Porsche 996 GT3 Cup											24	19			6
7	(United States) Carlos de Quesada	1	BMW M3 E36		6													5
8	(United States) Theo Ruijgh	19	Porsche 996 GT3 RSR	9	DNS													4
GT3-2 Class
1	(United States) Edward Hugo	111	Dodge Viper			7	8									7	8	21
2	(United States) Michael Lange	44	Ford GT GT3					**15**	**15**									14
3	(United States) Don Ondrejcak	65	Porsche 997 RSR					17	16	**Ret**	DNS							9
4	(United States) Bruce Leeson	26	Audi R8 LMS			**Ret**	DNS											1
GT3-3 Class
1	(United States) David Roberts	12	Audi R8 LMS					**12**	**11**	Ret	DNS	**7**	8	20	15			36
2	(United States) Bruce Leeson	26	Audi R8 LMS					14	14	10	7					**DNS**	**4**	25
3	(United States) David Alvarado	145	Porsche 997 GT3 Cup									9	7	19	21			21
4	(United States) Robert Van Zelst	134	Porsche 911 GT3 R							**7**	**10**							15
5	(United States) Mike Seen	12	Audi R8 LMS					**12**	**11**									14
6	(United States) George Calfo	12	Audi R8 LMS											20	15			11
7	(United States) Douglas Baron	911	Porsche 911 GT3 R			**5**	5			Ret	DNS							10
8	(United States) Robert Dalrymple	85	Porsche 997 GT3 R											16	DNS			10
Invitation class drivers ineligible for points
	(Australia) Philip Lewis	17	Radical SR3					13	13									
Pos.	Driver	No	Chassis	(Florida) SEB1		(California) LGA1		(New York (state)) WGL		(Wisconsin) ELK		(California) LGA2		(California) LGA3		(California) SON		Points

Key
Colour	Result
Gold	Winner
Silver	Second place
Bronze	Third place
Green	Other points position
Blue	Other classified position
Blue	Not classified, finished (NC)
Purple	Not classified, retired (Ret)
Red	Did not qualify (DNQ)
Red	Did not pre-qualify (DNPQ)
Black	Disqualified (DSQ)
White	Did not start (DNS)
White	Race cancelled (C)
Blank	Did not practice (DNP)
Blank	Excluded (EX)
Blank	Did not arrive (DNA)
Blank	Withdrawn (WD)
Blank	Did not enter (cell empty)
Text formatting	Meaning
**Bold**	Pole position
Italics	Fastest lap
