= Laurents Hörr =

German racing driver

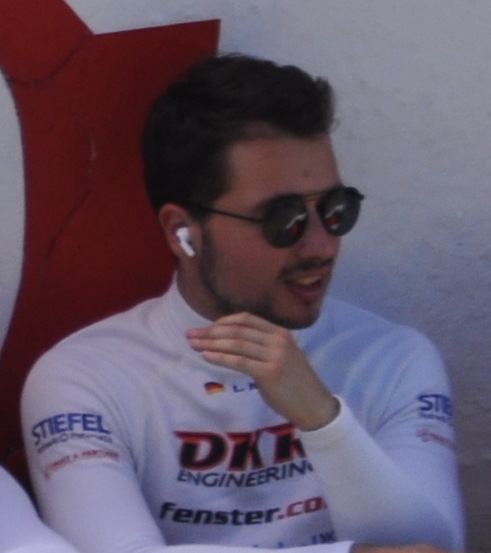
- Nationality: (Germany) German
- Born: 11 September 1997 (age 29) Gerlingen, Germany

European Le Mans Series career
- Debut season: 2020
- Current team: IDEC Sport
- Categorisation: FIA Silver (until 2021); FIA Gold (2022–)
- Car number: 4
- Former teams: DKR Engineering
- Starts: 17
- Wins: 3
- Podiums: 5
- Poles: 5
- Fastest laps: 3

Previous series
- 2019–20 2019 2017 2016 2015 2014: FIA World Endurance Championship; GT & Prototype Challenge; V de V Challenge Monoplace; Formula Renault 2.0 NEC; Formula Renault 1.6 Nordic; Formula Renault 1.6 NEC

Championship titles
- 2019, 2020 2021: Michelin Le Mans Cup – LMP3; European Le Mans Series – LMP3

Laurents Hörr (born 11 September 1997) is a German racing driver who currently competes in the European Le Mans Series.

== Career ==
=== Lower formula ===
Hörr began his open-wheel racing career in 2014, competing in a pair of races with Dutt Motorsport, a team he co-owned with Rolf and Oliver Dutt, in the Formula Renault 1.6 Northern European Cup. The following season, he scored his first open wheel victory at Anderstorp Raceway while competing in the Formula Renault 1.6 Nordic championship. Hörr started competing in Formula Renault 2.0 machinery in 2016. Following the 2017 season, a lack of funding prematurely ended his junior formula career.

=== Sports car racing ===
Due to Hörr's lack of funding, he made the transition to sports car racing for the 2018 season, taking part in the Michelin Le Mans Cup with French team CD Sport. His first season with the team was quiet, with Hörr finishing 7th in LMP3 class points. For 2019, he joined Luxembourg-based DKR Engineering. His second season in LMP3 machinery proved much more fruitful, as he and co-driver François Kirmann took overall LMP3 class honors in the Michelin Le Mans Cup, tallying two wins and five podiums across seven races. In February 2020, Hörr was drafted into Team Project 1's No. 56 GTE Am entry for the final four races of the 2019–20 FIA World Endurance Championship, replacing David Heinemeier Hansson. In Hörr's first race for the team, at Circuit of the Americas, the team took pole position in class alongside a third-place finish. In October of that year, Hörr and Jean Glorieux secured DKR Engineering's fourth consecutive Michelin Le Mans Cup title; Hörr's second in as many years. Hörr returned to DKR in 2021, taking on a full-season campaign in the European Le Mans Series. Alongside a revolving door of drivers, he claimed three race victories and took the LMP3 class title after a fourth-place finish at the final round at Portimão.

In late 2021, Hörr was nominated by the promoters and organizers of the FIA World Endurance Championship to participate in the 2021 rookie test at Bahrain International Circuit. The following season, he made his debut at the 24 Hours of Le Mans, competing in the LMP2 class for DKR Engineering. 2023 saw Hörr return full-time to the European Le Mans Series, competing for IDEC Sport alongside Paul-Loup Chatin and Paul Lafargue in the LMP2 class. He also took on a full-time drive in the Prototype Cup Germany, driving for Koiranen Kemppi Motorsport alongside Matthias Lüthen. In the former series, Hörr claimed two podiums in six races, finishing fifth in the LMP2 class championship. His Prototype Cup effort yielded a sole race victory and two additional podiums, en route to a sixth-place finish in the championship.

== Racing record ==
=== Career summary ===
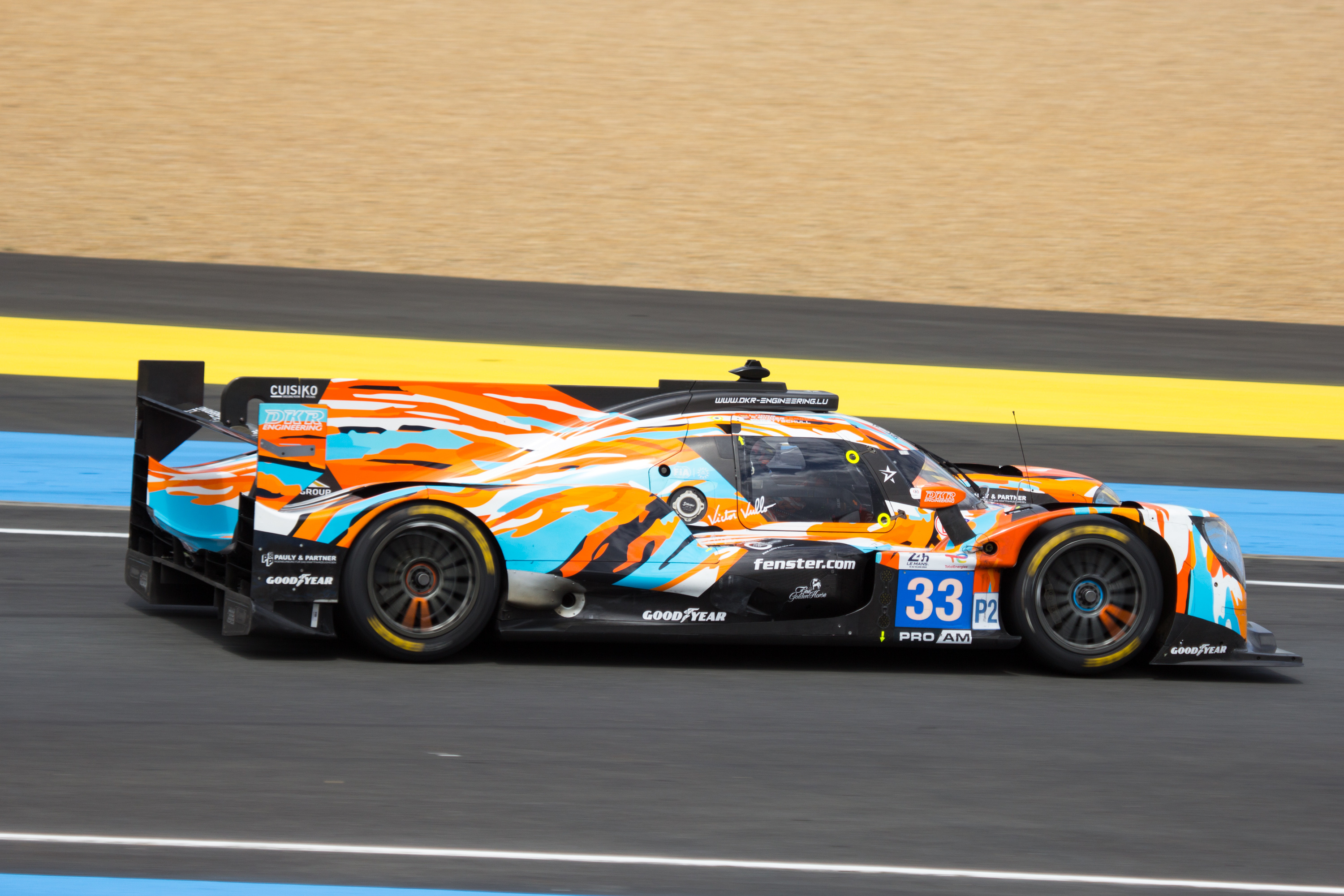
Hörr's No. 33 car at the 2024 24 Hours of Le Mans

Season	Series	Team	Races	Wins	Poles	F/Laps	Podiums	Points	Position
2014	Formula Renault 1.6 NEC	Dutt Motorsport	2	0	0	0	0	38	18th
2015	Formula Renault 1.6 Nordic	Dutt Motorsport	8	1	1	1	4	115	6th
2016	Formula Renault 2.0 NEC	Dutt Motorsport	13	0	0	0	0	69	20th
2017	V de V Challenge Monoplace	Dutt Motorsport	21	4	5	8	8	733.5	**2nd**
2018	Le Mans Cup - LMP3	CD Sport	7	0	0	1	0	34	7th
2018	DMV Dunlop 60 - Class 1	Schütz Motorsport	6	0	2	0	1	132	7th
2019	Le Mans Cup - LMP3	DKR Engineering	7	2	1	4	5	100	**1st**
2019	GT & Prototype Challenge - LMP3	Team Clim Air	3	2	?	?	3	89	**2nd**
2019	GT & Prototype Challenge - LMP3	DKR Engineering	1	1	?	?	1	89	**2nd**
2019–20	FIA World Endurance Championship - GTE Am	Team Project 1	2	0	1	0	1	28	18th
2020	Le Mans Cup - LMP3	DKR Engineering	7	3	0	1	6	120	**1st**
2020	European Le Mans Series - LMP3	DKR Engineering	5	0	0	0	0	24	15th
2021	European Le Mans Series - LMP3	DKR Engineering	6	3	4	3	3	105	**1st**
2021	Asian Le Mans Series - LMP3	DKR Engineering	4	0	0	0	0	32	6th
2021	Le Mans Cup - LMP3	DKR Engineering	2	0	1	0	0	1.5	33rd
2021	IMSA Prototype Challenge - LMP3-1	Mühlner Motorsport America	2	1	2	1	1	610	18th
2021	IMSA SportsCar Championship - LMP3	Mühlner Motorsport America	1	0	1	1	1	0	NC
2021	24 Hours of Le Mans - LMP2	Duqueine Team	Reserve driver						
2022	Asian Le Mans Series - LMP3	DKR Engineering	4	1	4	2	1	41	6th
2022	Le Mans Cup - LMP3	DKR Engineering	7	0	1	3	0	1	39th
2022	24 Hours of Le Mans - LMP2	DKR Engineering	1	0	0	0	0	N/A	18th
2023	European Le Mans Series - LMP2	IDEC Sport	6	0	1	0	2	72	5th
2023	24 Hours of Le Mans - LMP2	IDEC Sport	1	0	1	0	0	N/A	6th
2023	Prototype Cup Germany	Koiranen Kemppi Motorsport	9	1	1	2	3	111	6th
2023–24	Asian Le Mans Series - LMP2	DKR Engineering	5	0	0	0	2	62	5th
2024	Prototype Winter Series - Class 3	DKR Engineering	5	0	1	4	3	25.715	4th
2024	European Le Mans Series - LMP2 Pro-Am	DKR Engineering	6	0	0	0	0	38	8th
2024	Ultimate Cup Series - Proto P3	DKR Engineering	1	0	0	0	0	0	NC
2024	IMSA SportsCar Championship - LMP2	MDK by High Class Racing	2	0	0	0	0	483	36th
2024–25	Asian Le Mans Series - LMP2	DKR Engineering	6	0	0	0	1	28	8th
2025	Prototype Winter Series	DKR Engineering	8	1	1	2	4	119	**3rd**
2025	European Le Mans Series - LMP2	DKR Engineering	6	0	0	0	0	42	9th
2025	European Sprint Prototype Cup	DKR Engineering	10	2	4	9	9	176	**2nd**
2025	Nürburgring Langstrecken-Serie - V6	rent2Drive-racing	2	0	0	0	1	5	NC
2026	Nürburgring Langstrecken-Serie - V6	rent2Drive-racing	1	0	0	0	0	0	NC
2026	European Le Mans Series - LMP2	IDEC Sport	6	0	1	0	2	70	**3rd**
2026	Nürburgring Langstrecken-Serie - SP-X	Reiter Engineering	1	0	0	0	0	0	NC
2026	European Endurance Prototype Cup	DKR Engineering	5	0	0	0	0	11.75*	28th*
2026–27	Asian Le Mans Series - LMP2	DKR Engineering							

^{*} Season still in progress.

=== Complete Formula Renault 2.0 NEC results ===
(key) (Races in bold indicate pole position) (Races in italics indicate fastest lap)

Year	Entrant	1	2	3	4	5	6	7	8	9	10	11	12	13	14	15	DC	Points
2016	Dutt Motorsports	MNZ; 1; 12	MNZ; 2; 19	SIL; 1; 17	SIL; 2; 21	HUN; 1	HUN; 2	SPA; 1; 15	SPA; 2; 15	ASS; 1; 14	ASS; 2; 18	NÜR; 1; 19	NÜR; 2; 16	HOC; 1; 12	HOC; 2; 14	HOC; 3; 12	20th	69

=== Complete FIA World Endurance Championship results ===
(key) (Races in bold indicate pole position; races in italics indicate fastest lap)

Year	Entrant	Class	Chassis	Engine	1	2	3	4	5	6	7	8	Rank	Points
2019–20	Team Project 1	LMGTE Am	Porsche 911 RSR	Porsche 4.0L Flat-6	SIL	FUJ	SHA	BHR	**COA**; 3	SPA; 4	LMS	BHR	18th	28

=== Complete European Le Mans Series results ===
(key) (Races in bold indicate pole position; results in italics indicate fastest lap)

Year	Entrant	Class	Chassis	Engine	1	2	3	4	5	6	Rank	Points
2020	DKR Engineering	LMP3	Duqueine M30 – D-08	Nissan VK56DE 5.6L V8	LEC; 10	SPA; 6	LEC; 6	MNZ; 7	ALG; 10		15th	24
2021	DKR Engineering	LMP3	Duqueine M30 – D-08	Nissan VK56DE 5.6L V8	CAT; 5	**RBR**; 8	**LEC**; 1	**MNZ**; 1	**SPA**; 1	ALG; 4	1st	105
2023	IDEC Sport	LMP2	Oreca 07	Gibson GK428 4.2 L V8	CAT; 3	LEC; 5	ARA; 2	SPA; 4	POR; 7	**ALG**; 6	5th	70
2024	DKR Engineering	LMP2 Pro-Am	Oreca 07	Gibson GK428 4.2 L V8	CAT; 6	LEC; 8	IMO; 5	SPA; 5	MUG; Ret	ALG; 7	8th	38
2025	DKR Engineering	LMP2 Pro-Am	Oreca 07	Gibson GK428 4.2 L V8	CAT; 6	LEC; 7	IMO; 7	SPA; 7	SIL; 7	ALG; 5	9th	42
2026	IDEC Sport	LMP2	Oreca 07	Gibson GK428 4.2 L V8	CAT; 4	LEC; 4	IMO; 4	SPA; 3	SIL; 11	ALG; 2	3rd	70

^{*} Season still in progress.

=== Complete Asian Le Mans Series results ===
(key) (Races in bold indicate pole position) (Races in italics indicate fastest lap)

Year	Team	Class	Car	Engine	1	2	3	4	5	6	Pos.	Points
2021	DKR Engineering	LMP3	Duqueine M30 – D08	Nissan VK56DE 5.6L V8	DUB; 1 Ret	DUB; 2; 4	ABU; 1; 5	ABU; 2; 5			6th	32
2022	DKR Engineering	LMP3	Duqueine M30 – D08	Nissan VK56DE 5.6L V8	**DUB**; **1** Ret	**DUB**; **2**; 7	**ABU**; **1**; 1	**ABU**; **2**; 7			6th	41
2023–24	DKR Engineering	LMP2	Oreca 07	Gibson GK428 4.2 L V8	SEP; 1; 3	SEP; 2; 6	DUB; 4	ABU; 1; 3	ABU; 2; 4		5th	62
2024–25	DKR Engineering	LMP2	Oreca 07	Gibson GK428 4.2 L V8	SEP; 1; 7	SEP; 2; 9	DUB; 1; 2	DUB; 2; 9	ABU; 1 Ret	ABU; 2 Ret	8th	28

=== Complete IMSA SportsCar Championship results ===
(key) (Races in bold indicate pole position)

Year	Team	Class	Make	Engine	1	2	3	4	5	6	7	Rank	Points
2021	Mühlner Motorsports America	LMP3	Duqueine M30 – D-08	Nissan VK56DE 5.6 L V8	**DAY**; 3	SEB	MDO	WGL	WGL	ELK	PET	NC	0
2024	High Class Racing	LMP2	Oreca 07	Gibson GK428 4.2 L V8	DAY; 10	SEB; 8	WGL	MOS	ELK	IMS	ATL	*	*

^{*} Season still in progress.

=== Complete 24 Hours of Le Mans results ===
Year	Team	Co-Drivers	Car	Class	Laps	Pos.	Class Pos.
2022	(Luxembourg) DKR Engineering	(France) Alexandre Cougnaud (Belgium) Jean Glorieux	Oreca 07-Gibson	LMP2	362	22nd	18th
2023	(France) IDEC Sport	(France) Paul-Loup Chatin (France) Paul Lafargue	Oreca 07-Gibson	LMP2	327	14th	6th
2024	(Luxembourg) DKR Engineering	(Austria) René Binder (Germany) Alexander Mattschull	Oreca 07-Gibson	LMP2	195	21st	7th
2024	(Luxembourg) DKR Engineering	(Austria) René Binder (Germany) Alexander Mattschull	Oreca 07-Gibson	LMP2 Pro-Am	195	21st	**3rd**

=== Complete Prototype Cup Germany results ===
(key) (Races in bold indicate pole position) (Races in italics indicate fastest lap)

Year	Team	Car	Engine	1	2	3	4	5	6	7	8	9	10	11	12	DC	Points
2023	Koiranen Kemppi Motorsport	Duqueine M30 - D08	Nissan VK56DE 5.6 L V8	HOC; 1; 3	HOC; 2 DNS	**OSC**; **1**; 4	OSC; 2; 9	ZAN; 1; 4	ZAN; 2; 6	**NOR**; **1**; 5	NOR; 2; 1	ASS; 1; 3	ASS; 2 Ret	NÜR; 1	NÜR; 2	6th	111

^{*} Season still in progress.

Sporting positions
Preceded by Leonard Hoogenboom; Jens Petersen	Michelin Le Mans Cup; LMP3 Champion; 2019 & 2020; With: François Kirmann (2019)	Succeeded by Colin Noble; Anthony Wells
Preceded by Wayne Boyd; Tom Gamble; Robert Wheldon	European Le Mans Series; LMP3 Champion; 2021	Succeeded by Mike Benham; Malthe Jakobsen; Maurice Smith
