= Ginetta G58 =

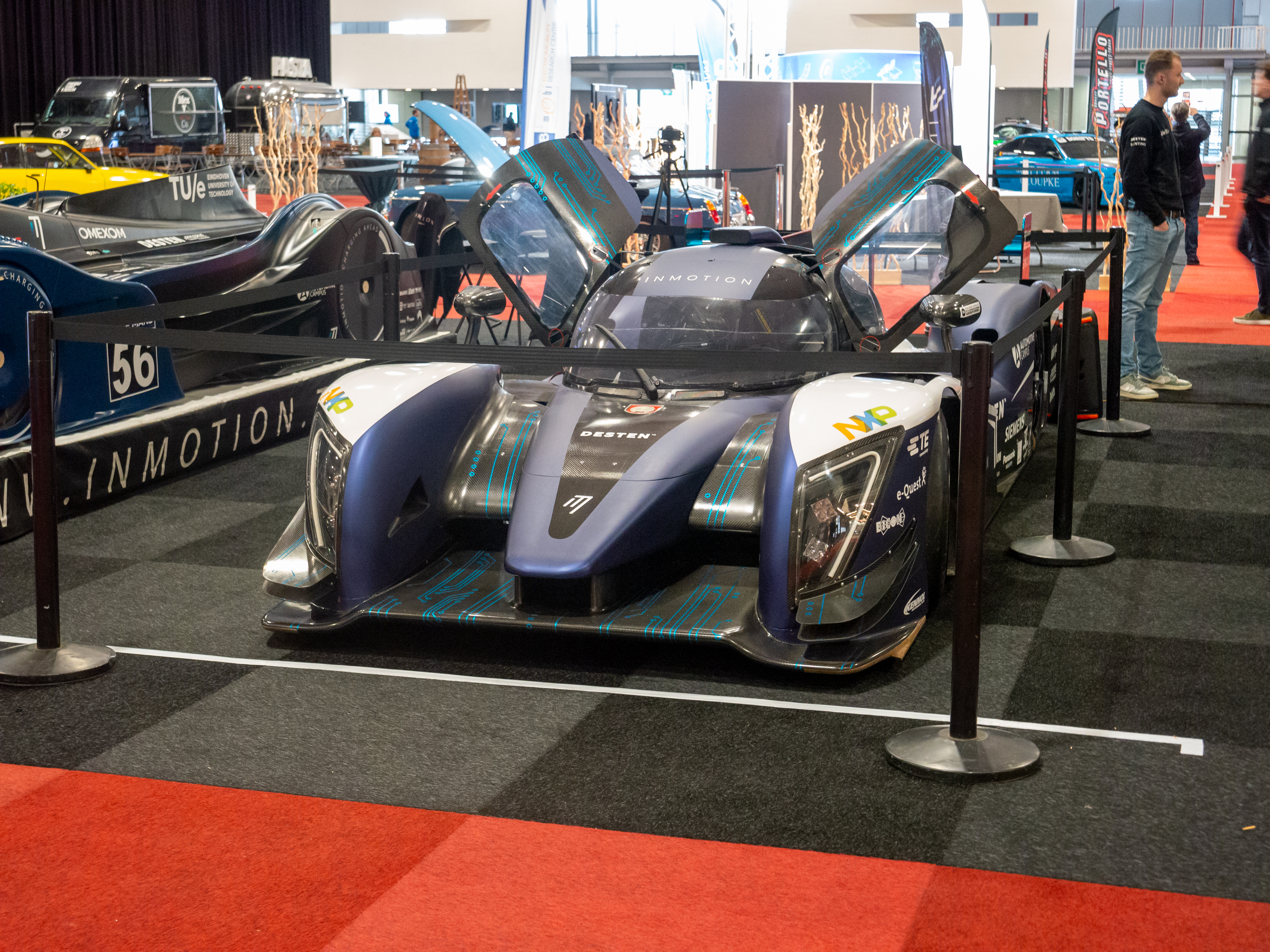
- Category: Prototype/Track Day
- Constructor: Ginetta
- Designer: Ewan Baldry

Technical specifications
- Chassis: Carbon Fibre Monocoque
- Length: 4,714 mm (185.6 in)
- Width: 1,998 mm (78.7 in)
- Wheelbase: 2,900 mm (110 in)
- Engine: 6,162 cubic centimetres (376.0 cu in; 6.162 L) LS3
- Transmission: X-Trac P1152 6 Speed Sequential
- Power: 575 brake horsepower (583 PS; 429 kW); 663 newton-metres (489 lbf⋅ft)
- Weight: 900kg
- Fuel: Various
- Lubricants: Motul
- Brakes: Alcon Monoblock 6 pot caliper with 355mm vented discs
- Tyres: Michelin, Hankook, Dunlop

Competition history
- Debut: 2018 12 Hours of Silverstone
- First win: 2018 12 Hours of Silverstone
Races	Wins	Titles
33	20	3
- Drivers' Championships: 2019-2021 GT & Prototype Challenge LMP3

The Ginetta G58 is a sports prototype developed by British car constructor Ginetta Cars. It is a development of its predecessors, the G57 P2, and the Ginetta-Juno P3-15, and can be built up from its predecessors. The car won on its race debut in 2018, at the Silverstone 12 Hours, the 4th race of the 2018 24H Proto Series.

== Development ==
The car is a further development of the Ginetta-Juno P3-15, and the Ginetta G57 P2, and has 30% more downforce compared to its predecessors, and a more powerful in house engine, replacing the Chevrolet LS3 6.2L V8, producing 575bhp. The car also has a top speed of 306km/h. Unlike its predecessors, it was not solely envisioned as a racecar, but also as a track-day car for enthusiasts and amateurs alike. As such, it has features that were lacking on its predecessors, such as an enhanced cooling pack with air-conditioning, Anti-Lock Braking System (ABS) and a 2nd Passenger seat. The car was launched at Autosport International 2018, on 15 January 2018, alongside the G60-LT-P1 LMP1 Prototype.

== Competition history ==
The car had its competition debut at the inaugural 12 Hours of Silverstone, as part of the 24H Proto Series. The #4 car entered by the Simpson Motorsport team, and piloted by Ginetta factory drivers Mike Simpson and Charlie Robertson, as well as Steve Tandy and Bob Berridge scored both Pole Position and the Overall Win. The car will be eligible in the P2 class of the Creventic 24H Proto Series, as well as the V de V Endurance Series.
