= Oreca 03 =

Sports prototype racing car

Oreca 03 Oreca 03R
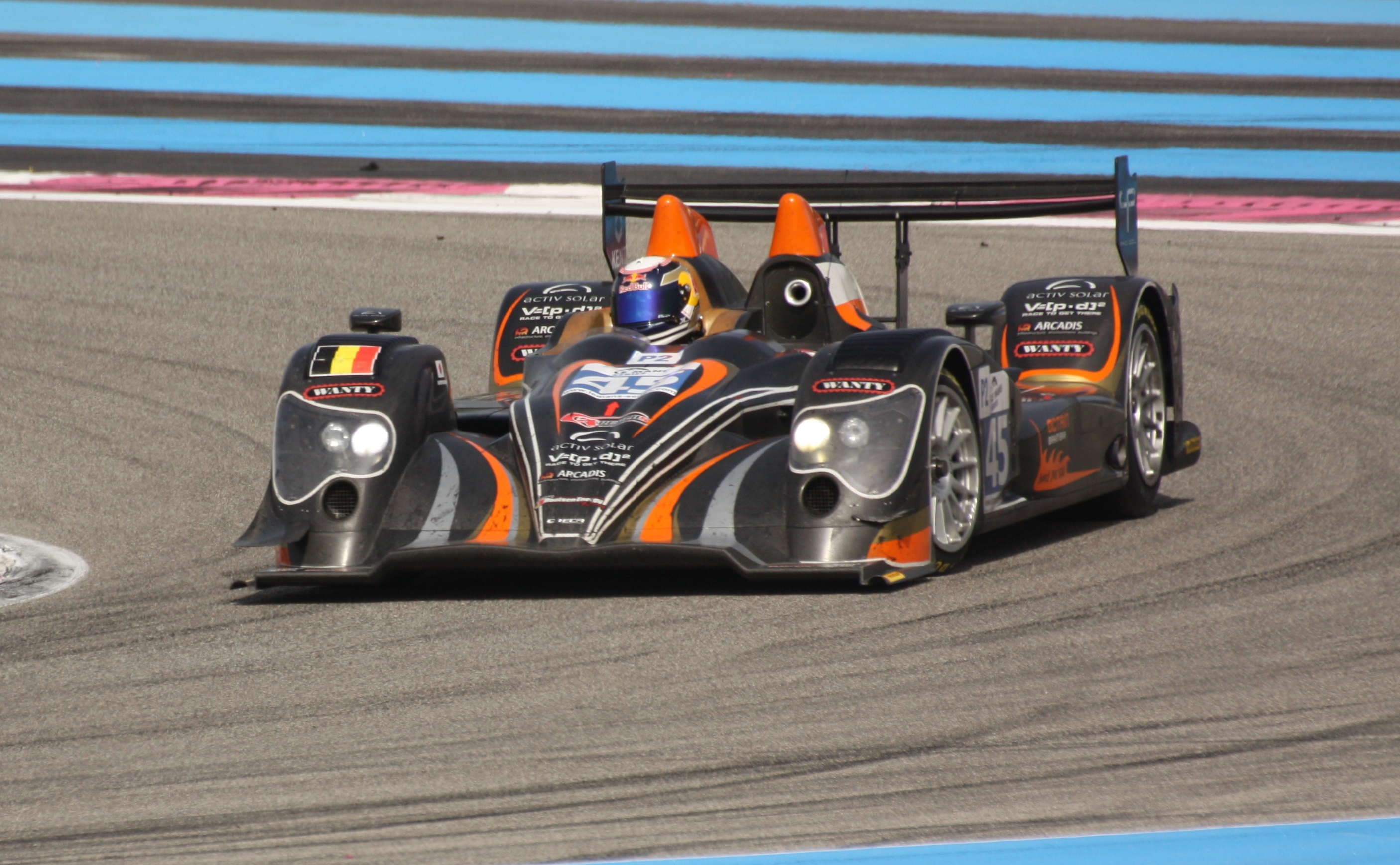
- Dominik Kraihamer driving the 03 at the 2011 6 Hours of Castellet
- Category: Le Mans Prototype 2 (LMP2)
- Constructor: Oreca
- Designers: Christophe Guibbal; David Floury
- Production: 24 built
- Successor: Oreca 05

Technical specifications
- Chassis: Carbon fibre monocoque
- Suspension (front): Double wishbone, push rod operated over damper
- Suspension (rear): Double wishbone, push rod operated over damper
- Length: 4,600 mm (181.1 in)
- Width: 1,990 mm (78.3 in)
- Axle track: front 1,670 mm (65.7 in) rear 1,650 mm (65.0 in)
- Wheelbase: 2,870 mm (113.0 in)
- Engine: Judd-BMW HK 3.6 L Nissan VK45DE 4.5 L V8 naturally aspirated mid-engined, longitudinally mounted
- Transmission: X-Trac 6-speed sequential manual
- Weight: 900kg
- Fuel: Motul; Total
- Tyres: Michelin; Dunlop

Competition history
- Notable entrants: Oreca 03/03R (France) Team Oreca-Matmut (France) Signatech Nissan (Switzerland) Race Performance (Belgium) Boutsen Energy Racing (France) TDS Racing (Russia) SMP Racing (Russia) G-Drive Racing (Philippines) Eurasia Motorsport (San Marino) Ibañez Racing (Republic of Ireland) Murphy Prototypes Alpine A450 (France) Signatech Alpine
- Notable drivers: (France) Alexandre Prémat (France) David Hallyday (France) Soheil Ayari (France) Franck Mailleux (Spain) Lucas Ordoñez (Norway) Thor-Christian Ebbesvik (United Kingdom) Jody Firth (Switzerland) Mathias Beche (France) Pierre Thiriet (Austria) Dominik Kraihamer (Switzerland) Michel Frey (Switzerland) Ralph Meichtry; Various Many Others
- Debut: 2011 12 Hours of Sebring
- First win: 2011 12 Hours of Sebring
- Last win: 2015 6 Hours of Shanghai (WEC)
- Last event: 2015 6 Hours of Bahrain (WEC)
Races	Wins	Poles	F/Laps
60+	27	4+	5
- Teams' Championships: 6 (2011 ILMC, 2012 ELMS, 2013 ELMS, 2014 ELMS, 2014 FIA WEC, 2015-16 Asian LMS)
- Constructors' Championships: 2 (2011 LMS, 2012 ELMS)
- Drivers' Championships: 5 (2012 ELMS, 2013 ELMS, 2014 ELMS, 2014 FIA WEC, 2015-16 Asian LMS)

The Oreca 03 is a Le Mans Prototype built by Oreca in 2011. It is built within the revised 2011 ACO regulations for the 24 Hours of Le Mans. The car made its début at the 12 Hours of Sebring run by Signatech Nissan and set to race at the 2011 24 Hours of Le Mans. It is the third car that Oreca has produced after the 01 and FLM09. 24 Oreca 03 were built.

== Development ==
To meet the new regulations brought in by the ACO for endurance racing, the 03 has been cost-capped along with all 2011 LMP2 cars with a price of €345,000. The engines used in LMP2 cars for 2011 are production-based and there is a wide variety of engines to choose from that can be put into an 03. The five teams racing it in 2011 have chosen two of these engine. Most of the teams, including Oreca themselves, have chosen the Nissan-powered 4.5 L V8 powerplant which is similar to the engine used by Nismo in Super GT. The Swiss team of Race Performance have opted for a Judd BMW-powered 3.6 L V8 engine based on the BMW M3. Both engines produce a limited 460 bhp (343.0 kW). The 03 is built around a light carbon fibre monocoque chassis with an open top bodywork. Suspension is by double wishbones and push-rods on all four corners. Stopping power is provided by carbon-ceramic disc brakes.

The Oreca 03 uses the same body and aero package developed by Oreca's chief-engineer David Floury for the LMP1 car campaigned during the 2009 and 2010 season by the works team. The blade-shaped roll-over structure is still a direct descendant of the original Courage LC70 design.

French car manufacturer Alpine raced the Alpine A450 in the 2015 FIA World Endurance Championship. This car is technically identical to the Oreca 03, using the same chassis and internals with Alpine branding.

== Racing History ==
=== 2011 ===
Five 03's have been built, four of which have competed in races. Team Oreca have not entered a race yet but plan to race at the 1000 km of Spa and Le Mans. The first race the Oreca 03 competed in was the 2011 12 Hours of Sebring, the first round of the American Le Mans Series and Intercontinental Le Mans Cup, where the French team of Signatech Nissan competed for ILMC glory in the LMP2 class with drivers Franck Mailleux, long term Oreca driver Soheil Ayari and 2009 GT Academy winner Lucas Ordoñez. The trio had been quick throughout practice and took pole at the Sebring International Raceway, almost four seconds quicker than the next nearest LMP2 class car. Unfortunately, because the car was brand new, problems occurred including continuous gearbox problems. In the end, the No. 26 car finished 30th overall and second in class as there were very little LMP2 entrants.

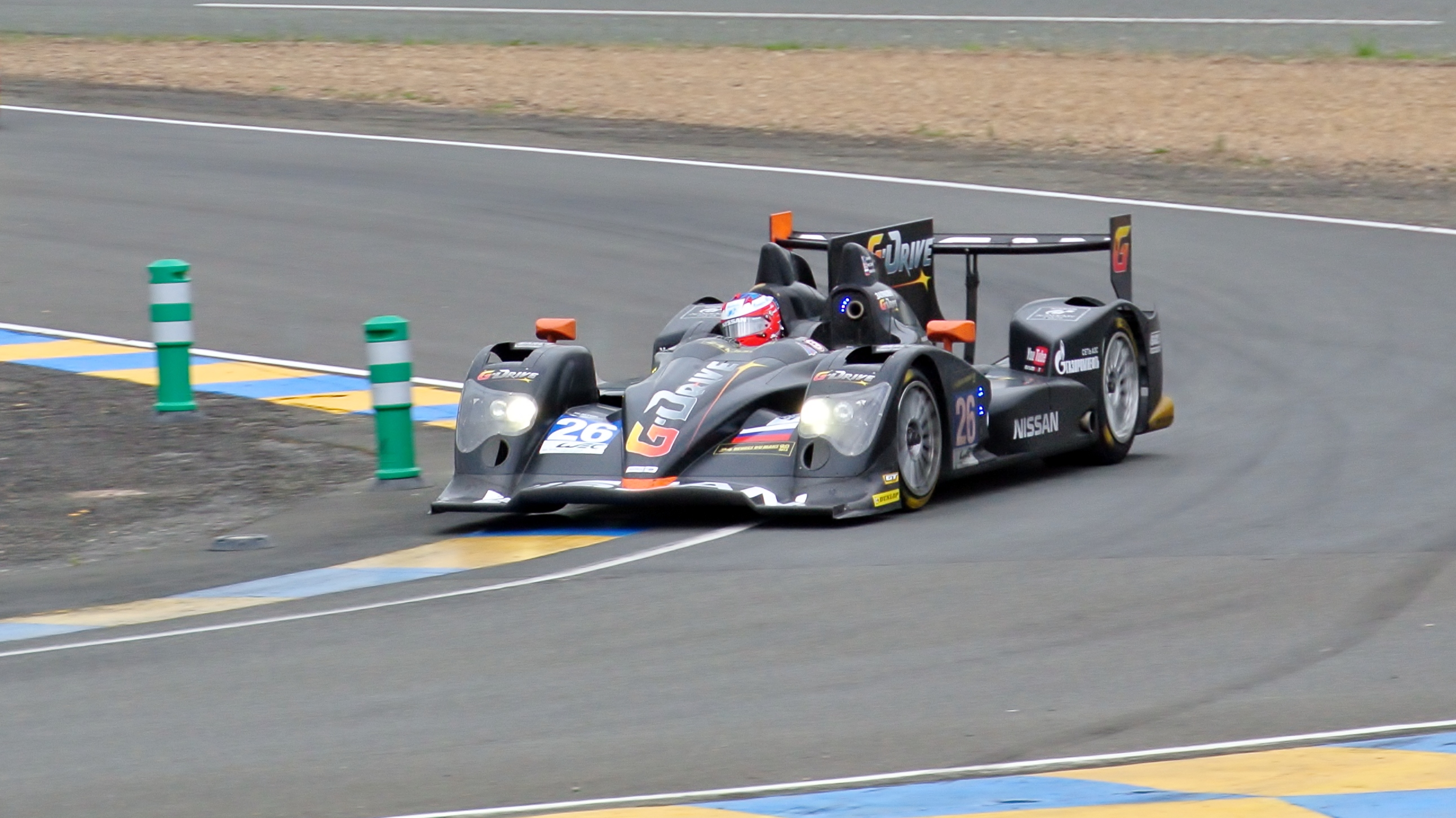
2013 Oreca 03-Nissan LMP2 Le Mans series racing car

The next race on the calendar was the 6 Hours of Castellet, round one of the 2011 Le Mans Series season. There were three 03's present at this race with TDS Racing, Boutsen Energy Racing and Race Performance competing in their respective chassis'. It was the TDS Racing team of Mathias Beche, Pierre Thiriet and Jody Firth that took pole position in the LMP2 class with the Boutsen car qualifying second in class and Race Performance qualifying fourth. Once again the 03's encountered mechanical issues with the TDS car retiring after 91 laps. The other two cars finished the race with the Boutsen Energy drivers of Dominik Kraihamer and Nicolas de Crem finishing fourth place in class and the Race Performance drivers of Michel Frey, Ralph Meichtry and Thor-Christian Ebbesvik finishing sixth.

=== Historic racing ===
Many Oreca 03 chassis are active in historic racing competitions throughout Europe and the USA. In the Masters Endurance Legends series, based in Europe, an ex-Sébastien Loeb Racing chassis, used in the 2014 ELMS and 24 Hours of Le Mans, previously No. 24, now 74, competes in the championship as well as an ex-Thiriet by TDS Racing model, numbered 46.

In the USA-based Masters Endurance Legends USA, multiple Oreca 03 examples have competed, a Judd-powered chassis previously entered by Race Performance No. 34, an ex-Boutsen Ginion Racing model numbered 40, an-ex Murphy Prototypes 03 numbered 48 also competes as well as a fourth chassis numbered 8 with a Thiriet by TDS Racing scheme.
