= Ginetta-Juno P3-15 =

British sports car prototype

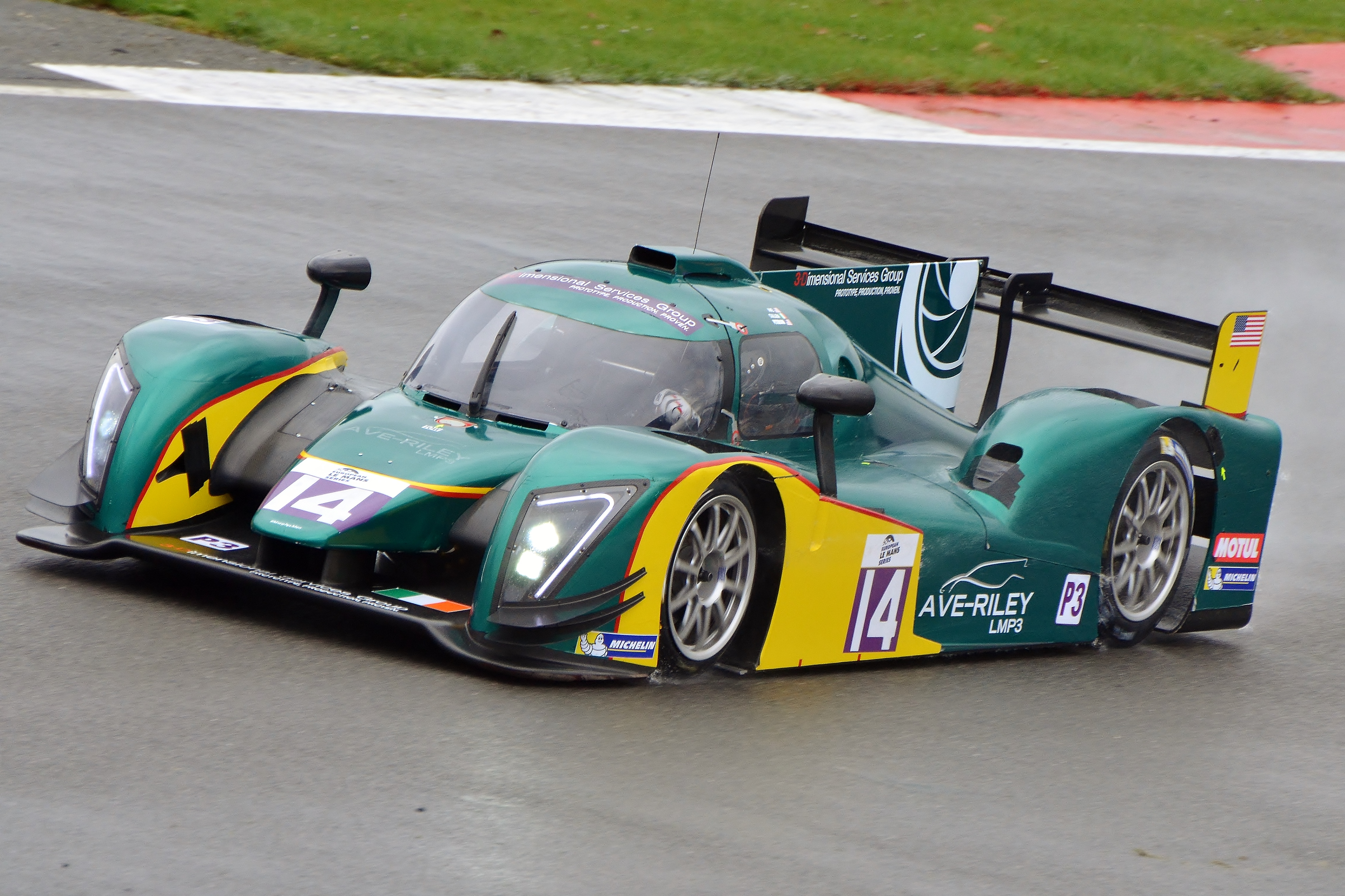
- The No. 14 P3-15 of MurphyP3-3Dimensional.com during the 2016 4 Hours of Silverstone.
- Category: Le Mans Prototype (LMP3)
- Constructor: Ginetta Cars
- Designer: Ewan Baldry (technical director)
- Successor: Track Day:Ginetta G57 P2; LMP3: Ginetta G61-LT-P3

Technical specifications
- Chassis: Carbon Fibre/Aluminium Honeycomb Monocoque
- Suspension (front): Pull-rod double wishbone
- Suspension (rear): Pull-rod double wishbone
- Length: 4650mm
- Width: 1950mm
- Height: 1085mm
- Engine: Nissan VK50DE V8
- Transmission: X-Trac 6 Speed Sequential
- Weight: 930kg
- Fuel: Various
- Lubricants: Various
- Brakes: 6 Piston Alcon Ventilated Disks
- Tyres: Michelin

Competition history
- Notable entrants: (United Kingdom) Team LNT (United Kingdom) University of Bolton (United Kingdom) Lanan Racing (Spain) Speed Factory Racing (Japan) TKS (Italy) Villorba Corse (Slovakia) ARC Bratislava
- Debut: 2015 4 Hours of Silverstone
- First win: 2015 4 Hours of Silverstone
- Last win: 2017 4 Hours of Buriram
- Last event: 2019 Gulf 12 Hours
Races	Wins
31	6
- Teams' Championships: 1 (2015 European Le Mans Series (LMP3))
- Drivers' Championships: 1 (2015 European Le Mans Series (LMP3))

The Ginetta-Juno P3-15, also known as the Ginetta-Juno P3, is a Le Mans Prototype LMP3 built to ACO Le Mans Prototype LMP3 regulations. It was designed by Ewan Baldry, and built by Ginetta Cars. The car was the first car to launch, and run in the class, with it making its debut at the 2015 4 Hours of Silverstone. It subsequently formed the basis of the G57 P2, and the later G58. A direct successor to the P3-15, the G61-LT-P3, was developed to meet the new 2020 LMP3 regulations, while retaining the original tub utilised in the P3-15.

== Development ==
In 2013, the ACO announced a new category of Le Mans Prototypes, known as LMP3, which would replace the previous Le Mans Prototype Challenge (LMPC) class in 2015. Shortly afterwards, Juno Racing Cars announced that it would be building a car for the class, before it was purchased by Ginetta. The engine is a Nissan VK50VE producing 420 hp, paired to an Xtrac 6-Speed Manual Sequential Gearbox. The car had its first shakedown run at Leeds East Airport, with Ginetta chairman Lawrence Tomlinson at the wheel.

The car was initially overweight, due to a misprediction of the mass of the powertrain, until the minimum weight of the class was raised to 930 kg by the ACO. After the 2015 season, it was announced that Ginetta would be moving on from the project, and focusing on the G57 P2 Track day car. This was due to a dispute between powertrain components supplier ORECA, and Ginetta.

The tub of the car is shared with its successors, the Ginetta G57 P2, the Ginetta G58, and the Ginetta G61-LT-P3, and can be upgraded with new bodywork and engine configurations to be built up into its successors.

=== Roborace Devbot ===
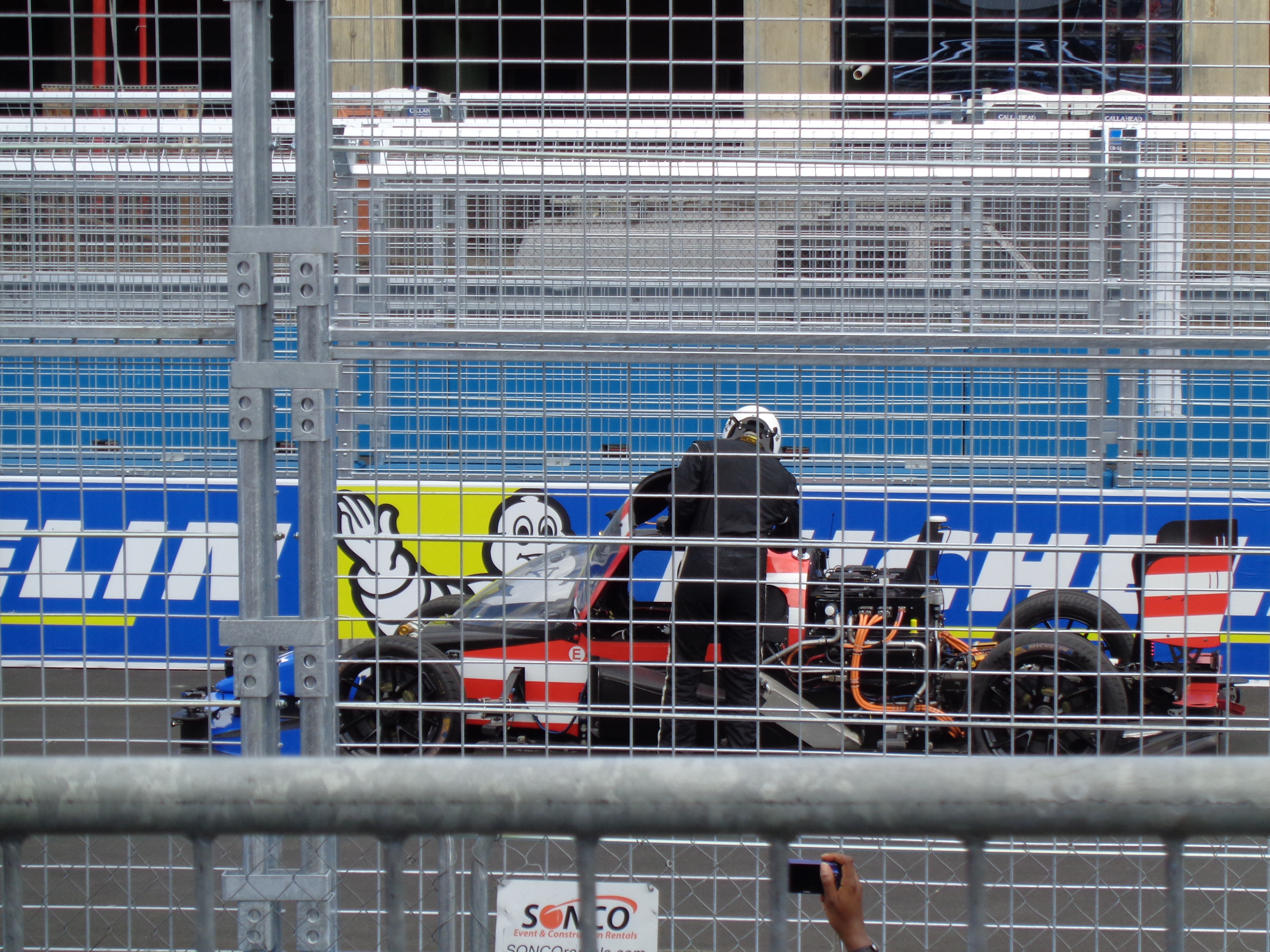
Roborace Devbot, based on the Ginetta P3 Chassis

The car also formed the base of the Roborace Devbot, used for the development of the Artificial Intelligence software for the future electrically powered autonomous racing series. The Devbot incorporates the same internal units that are used in the actual RoboCar, and is stripped off all bodywork, to provide better cooling and access. The Devbot would have its initial public test during Pre-Season testing for the 2016–17 FIA Formula E Championship, at the Donington Park Circuit.

== Competition History ==
In October 2014, the first car was announced to be sold to the University of Bolton, under its Centre for Advanced Performance Engineering (CAPE). For the 2015 season, 6 cars would be run in the European Le Mans series, with 2 run by the factory Ginetta team, Team LNT. The factory cars secured the 1st and 2nd in the LMP3 Championship. The Ginettas also won all races in the season, while the sole non-Ginetta car, a Ligier JS P3 run by Graff Racing managed a podium on its debut, at the end of the season.

Following the end of the season, after Ginetta's announcement, that it would shift its focus towards the G57 P2, the car was dropped by most teams, which switched to the Ligier JS P3. The car has remained more popular in Asia since the 2015 season, although it is noted to be similarly quick to the Ligier.

== Complete European Le Mans Series results ==
Results in bold indicate pole position. Results in italics indicate fastest lap.

Year	Entrant	Class	Drivers	No.	1	2	3	4	5	6	Points	Pos
Year	Entrant	Class	Drivers	No.	**(United Kingdom)**; **SIL**	**(Italy)**; **IMO**	**(Austria)**; **RBR**	**(France)**; **LEC**	**(Portugal)**; **EST**		Points	Pos
**2015**	(United Kingdom) Team LNT	LMP3	(France) Gaëtan Paletou	2	2	Ret	3	Ret	1		**58**	**2nd**
**2015**	(United Kingdom) Team LNT	LMP3	(United Kingdom) Michael Simpson	2	2	Ret		Ret	1		**58**	**2nd**
**2015**	(United Kingdom) Team LNT	LMP3	(Russia) Mark Shulzhitskiy	2			3				**58**	**2nd**
**2015**	(United Kingdom) Team LNT	LMP3	(United Kingdom) Chris Hoy	3	1	Ret	1	1	3		**94**	**1st**
**2015**	(United Kingdom) Team LNT	LMP3	(United Kingdom) Charlie Robertson	3	1	Ret	1	1	3		**94**	**1st**
**2015**	(Italy) Villorba Corse	LMP3	(Italy) Roberto Lacorte	5		Ret	2	2	Ret		**36**	**5th**
**2015**	(Italy) Villorba Corse	LMP3	(Italy) Giorgio Sernagiotto	5		Ret	2	2	Ret		**36**	**5th**
**2015**	(United Kingdom) University of Bolton	LMP3	(United Kingdom) Rob Garofall	7	3	1					**40**	**4th**
**2015**	(United Kingdom) University of Bolton	LMP3	(Germany) Jens Petersen	7	3						**40**	**4th**
**2015**	(United Kingdom) University of Bolton	LMP3	(Denmark) Morten Dons	7		1					**40**	**4th**
**2015**	(United Kingdom) Lanan Racing	LMP3	(United Kingdom) Alex Craven	11	Ret	3					**16**	**7th**
**2015**	(United Kingdom) Lanan Racing	LMP3	(United Kingdom) Joey Foster	11	Ret						**16**	**7th**
**2015**	(United Kingdom) Lanan Racing	LMP3	(United Kingdom) Charlie Hollings	11	Ret						**16**	**7th**
**2015**	(United Kingdom) Lanan Racing	LMP3	(Russia) Mark Shulzhitskiy	11		3					**16**	**7th**
**2015**	(Spain) SVK by Speed Factory	LMP3	(Latvia) Konstantīns Calko	15	4	2	Ret	3	4		**57**	**3rd**
**2015**	(Spain) SVK by Speed Factory	LMP3	(Lithuania) Dainius Matijošaitis	15	4	2	Ret	3	4		**57**	**3rd**
**2015**	(Spain) SVK by Speed Factory	LMP3	(Spain) Jesús Fuster	15	4	2	Ret		4		**57**	**3rd**
**2015**	(Spain) SVK by Speed Factory	LMP3	(Netherlands) Mirco van Oostrum	15				3			**57**	**3rd**
					**(United Kingdom)**; **SIL**	**(Italy)**; **IMO**	**(Austria)**; **RBR**	**(France)**; **LEC**	**(Belgium)**; **SPA**	**(Portugal)**; **EST**	Points	Pos
**2016**	(Republic of Ireland) MurphyP3-3Dimensional.com	LMP3	(United States) Tony Ave	14	Ret						**0**	**N/A**
**2016**	(Republic of Ireland) MurphyP3-3Dimensional.com	LMP3	(Republic of Ireland) Michael Cullen	14	Ret						**0**	**N/A**
**2016**	(Republic of Ireland) MurphyP3-3Dimensional.com	LMP3	(United States) Doug Peterson	14	Ret						**0**	**N/A**

== Complete Asian Le Mans Series results ==
Results in bold indicate pole position. Results in italics indicate fastest lap.

Year	Entrant	Class	Drivers	No.	1	2	3	4	Points	Pos
Year	Entrant	Class	Drivers	No.	**(China)**; **ZHU**	**(Japan)**; **FUJ**	**(Thailand)**; **BUR**	**(Malaysia)**; **SEP**	Points	Pos
**2016 - 2017**	(Slovakia) ARC Bratislava	LMP3	(United Kingdom) Darren Burke	4	4	2	1	6	**63**	**2nd**
**2016 - 2017**	(Slovakia) ARC Bratislava	LMP3	(Slovakia) Miroslav Konopka	4	4	2	1		**63**	**2nd**
**2016 - 2017**	(Slovakia) ARC Bratislava	LMP3	(United Kingdom) Mike Simpson	4	4	2	1		**63**	**2nd**
**2016 - 2017**	(Slovakia) ARC Bratislava	LMP3	(Latvia) Konstantīns Calko	4				6	**63**	**2nd**
**2016 - 2017**	(Slovakia) ARC Bratislava	LMP3	(Australia) Neale Muston	7	5	4	2	7	**46**	**5th**
**2016 - 2017**	(Slovakia) ARC Bratislava	LMP3	(Latvia) Konstantīns Calko	7	5	4	2		**46**	**5th**
**2016 - 2017**	(Slovakia) ARC Bratislava	LMP3	(Slovakia) Miroslav Konopka	7				7	**46**	**5th**
**2016 - 2017**	(Slovakia) ARC Bratislava	LMP3	(United Kingdom) Mike Simpson	7				7	**46**	**5th**
**2016 - 2017**	(Philippines) PRT Racing	LMP3	(Netherlands) Ate de Jong	67	Ret	5	4	Ret	**22**	**8th**
**2016 - 2017**	(Philippines) PRT Racing	LMP3	(United Kingdom) Charlie Robertson	67	Ret	5	4	Ret	**22**	**8th**
**2016 - 2017**	(Philippines) PRT Racing	LMP3	(Estonia) Martin Rump	67	Ret	5			**22**	**8th**
**2016 - 2017**	(Malaysia) Aylezo Ecotint Racing	LMP3	(Malaysia) Zen Low	69	Ret	6	8	4	**24**	**7th**
**2016 - 2017**	(Malaysia) Aylezo Ecotint Racing	LMP3	(Malaysia) Weiron Tan	69	Ret	6	8	4	**24**	**7th**
**2016 - 2017**	(Malaysia) Aylezo Ecotint Racing	LMP3	(Italy) Giacomo Barri	69	Ret				**24**	**7th**
**2016 - 2017**	(Malaysia) Aylezo Ecotint Racing	LMP3	(United Kingdom) Riki Christodoulou	69		6	8	4	**24**	**7th**
					**(China)**; **ZHU**	**(Japan)**; **FUJ**	**(Thailand)**; **BUR**	**(Malaysia)**; **SEP**	Points	Pos
**2017 - 2018**	(Japan) TKS	LMP3	(Japan) Yuta Kamimura	99		3			**15**	**6th**
**2017 - 2018**	(Japan) TKS	LMP3	(Japan) Shinyo Sano	99		3			**15**	**6th**
**2017 - 2018**	(Japan) TKS	LMP3	(Japan) Takuya Shirasaka	99		3			**15**	**6th**
					**(China)**; **ZHU**	**(Japan)**; **FUJ**	**(Thailand)**; **BUR**	**(Malaysia)**; **SEP**	Points	Pos
**2018 - 2019**	(Slovakia) ARC Bratislava	LMP3	(Australia) Neale Muston	44				9	**2**	**10th**
**2018 - 2019**	(Slovakia) ARC Bratislava	LMP3	(United Kingdom) Mike Simpson	44				9	**2**	**10th**
