= Ginetta G57 P2 =

Sports prototype

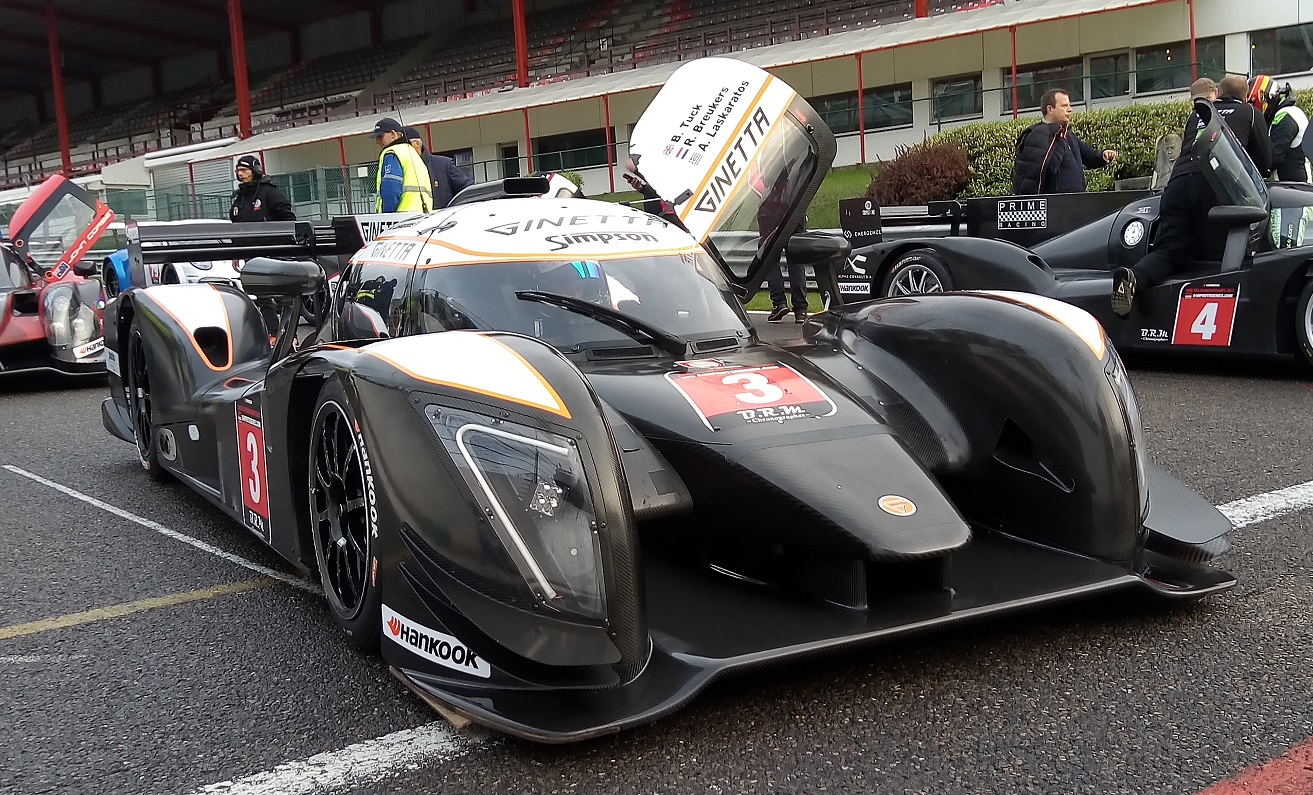
- Category: Prototype/track day
- Constructor: Ginetta Cars
- Designer(s): Peter Smith (lead designer)

Technical specifications
- Chassis: carbon fiber monocoque
- Engine: Chevrolet LS3 6,200 cc (378.3 cu in) V8 mid-engined
- Transmission: Xtrac six-speed transaxle
- Weight: 900 kg (1,984.2 lb)
- Brakes: Alcon Monoblock
- Tyres: Michelin

Competition history

The Ginetta G57 P2 is a sports prototype developed by British car constructor Ginetta Cars. The car made its race track debut in 2016.

== History ==
Ginetta Cars revamped its sports prototype production with the acquisition of Juno Racing Cars in 2014. For 2015 Ginetta-Juno the brand launched the LMP Track Car. After launching the Ginetta-Juno LMP3, the company launched the G57 P2. This sports prototype was fitted with a more powerful Chevrolet LS3 engine. Also the G57 P2 has 30% more downforce that its LMP3 relative. The official launch was at the Autosport International show in January 2016.

The G57 P2 made its racing debut at Circuit de Barcelona-Catalunya in the V de V Endurance Series. Four cars entered the race, all four finished. The best placed G57 P2 finished in third place overall, with Ginetta director Lawrence Tomlinson sharing a drive with Mike Simpson. At the end of the racing season the G57 P2 raced in the 25 Hours of Thunderhill. Bryan Herta, Colton Herta and Ryan Carpenter placed the prototype in third place overall. Starting in 2017 the G57 P2 was given a separate class in the 24H Proto Series.

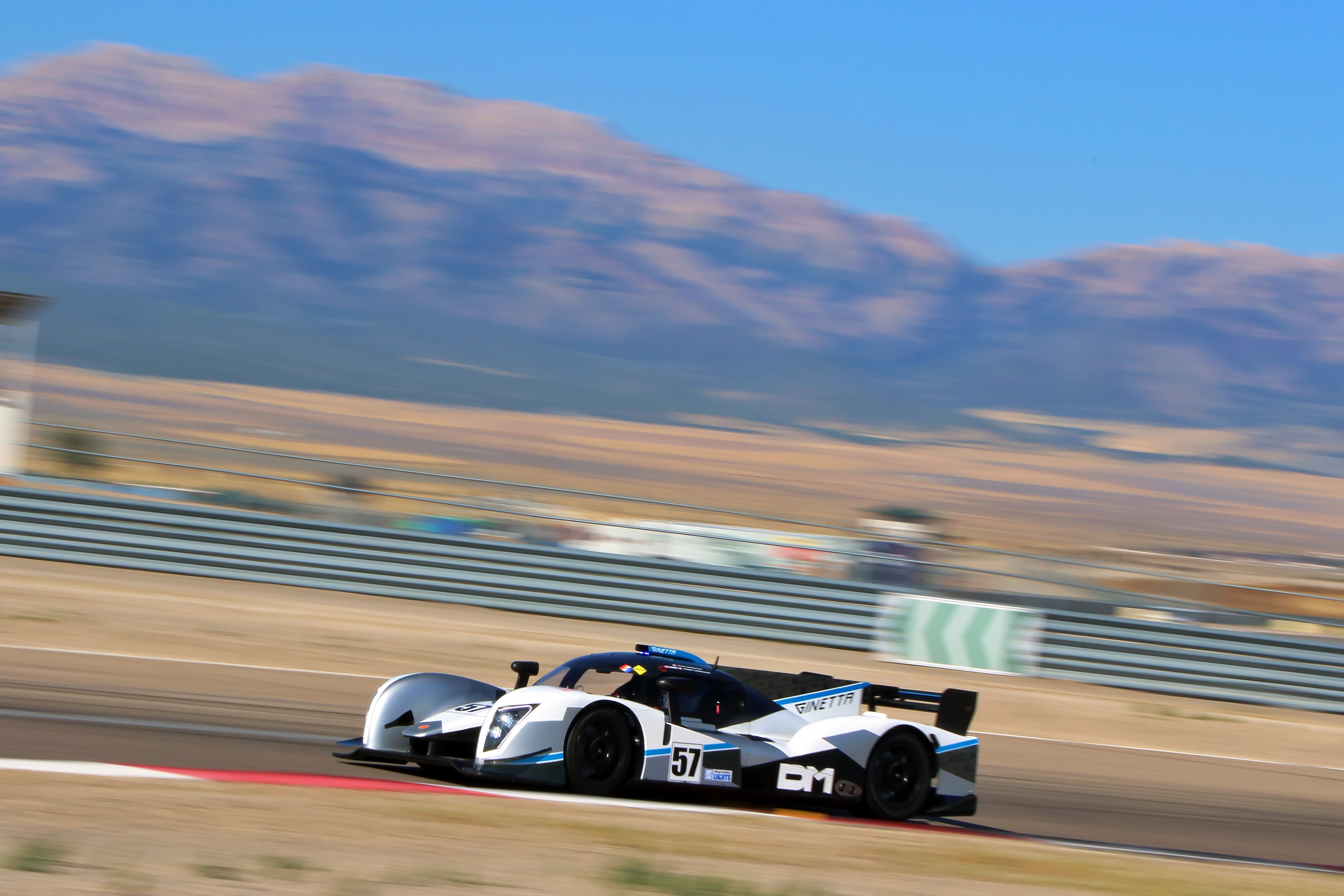
Ryno Racing G57-P2

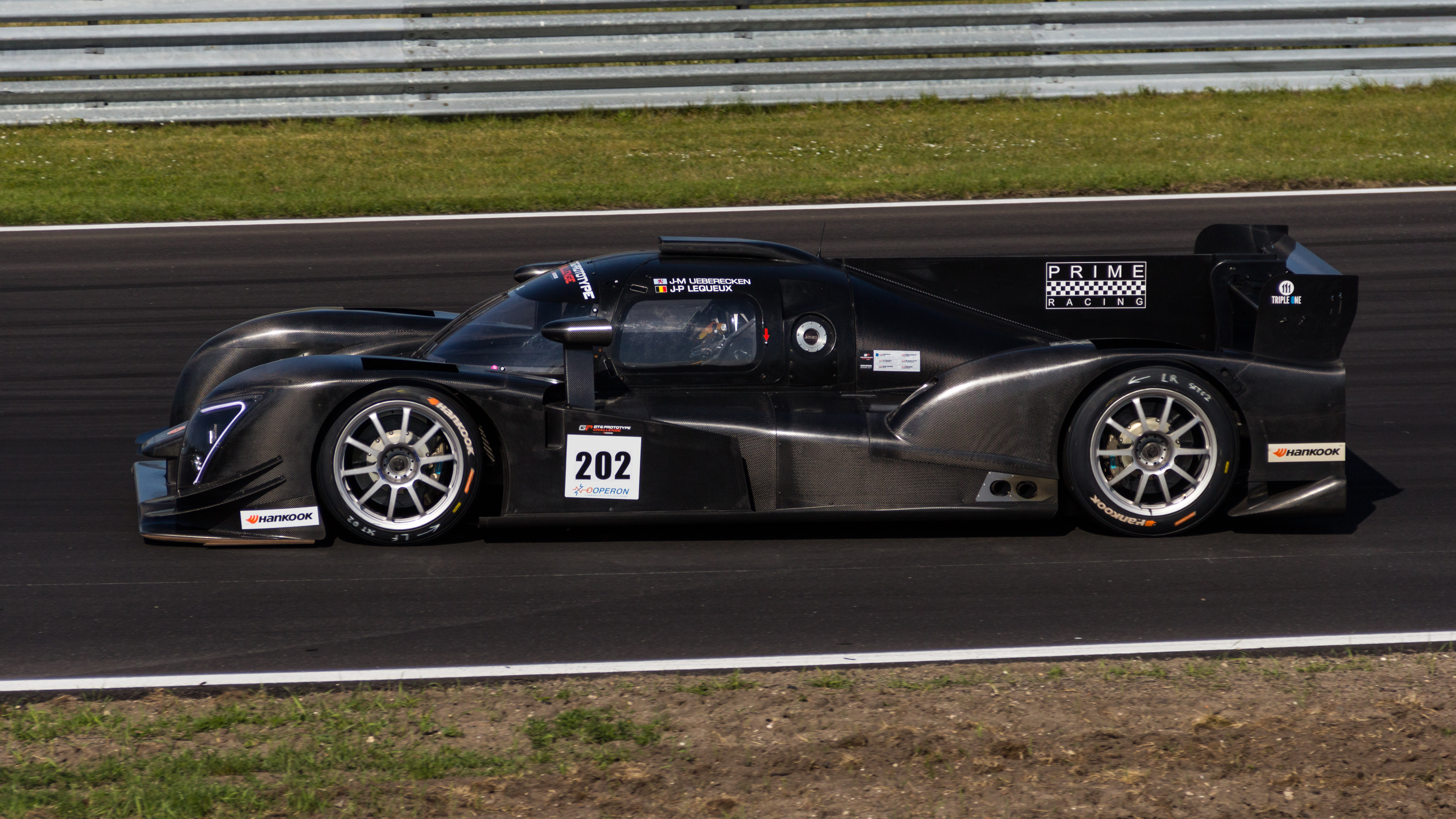
202 - Ginetta G57 P2 - Lequeux

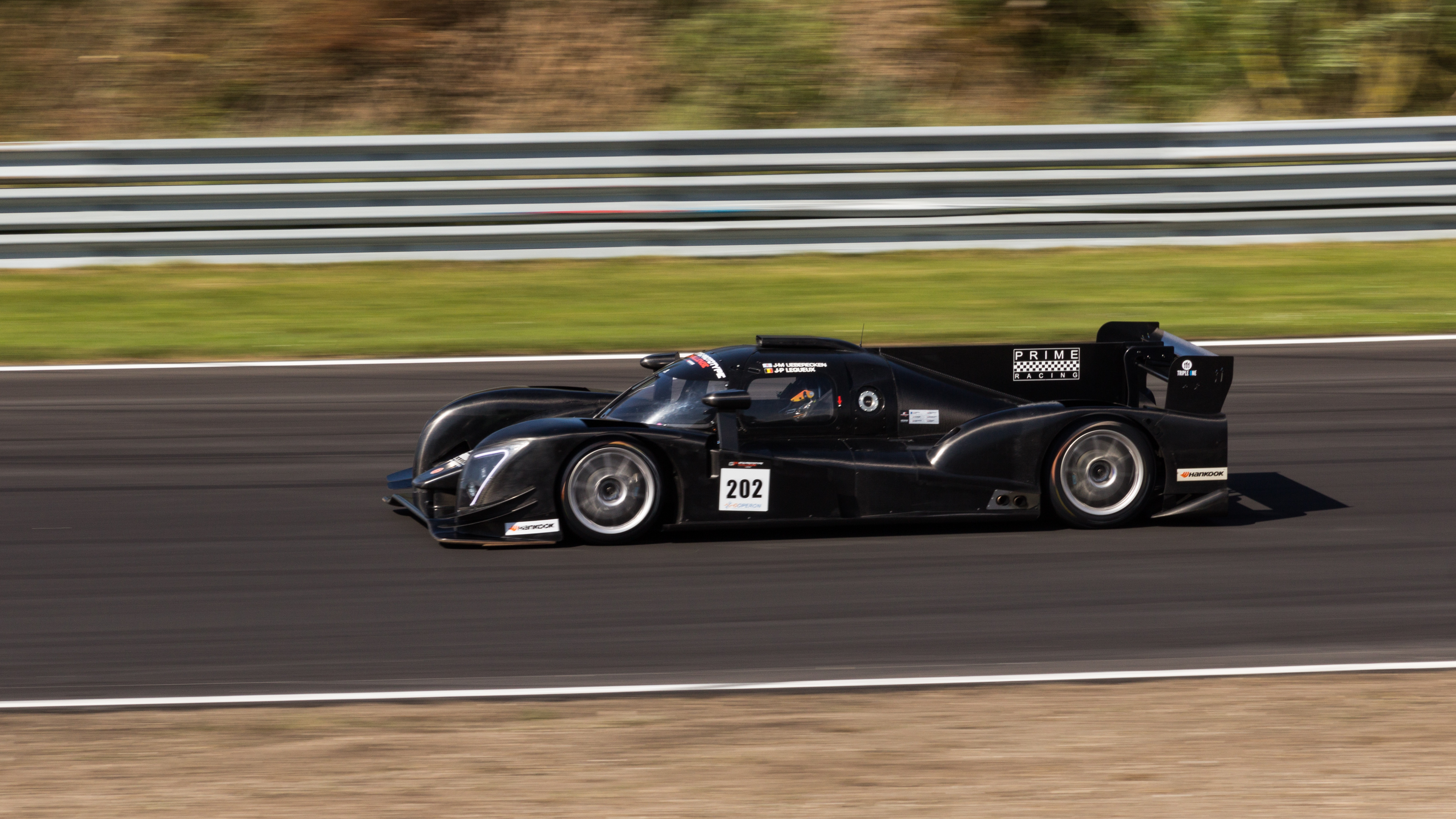
202 - Ginetta G57 P2 - Lequeux

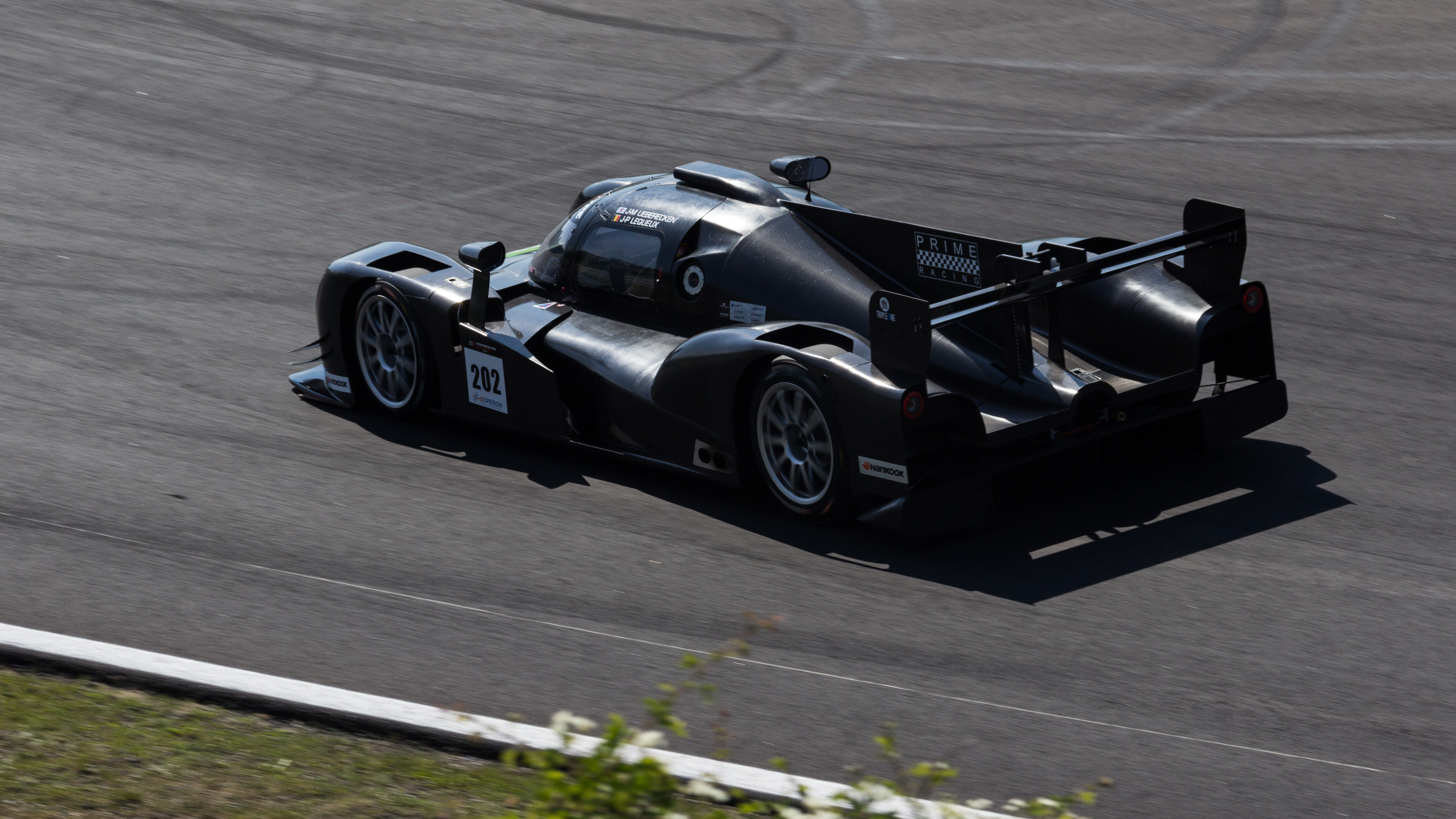
202 - Ginetta G57 P2 - Lequeux
