= 2025 SRO GT Cup =

Sports car racing series edition

The 2025 SRO GT Cup is the inaugural running of the SRO GT Cup, a Chinese sports car racing series for SRO GT4 cars organised by the SRO Motorsports Group. The season started on 21 March at Shanghai International Circuit and will end on 16 November at the Guia Circuit for the Greater Bay Area GT Cup.

== Calendar ==
Round	Circuit	Date	Supporting	Map
1	(China) Shanghai International Circuit, Jiading, Shanghai	21–23 March	Formula One World Championship; F1 Academy; Porsche Carrera Cup Asia	2025 SRO GT Cup is located in China
2	(China) Pingtan Ruyi Lake International City Circuit, Pingtan, Fujian	27–29 June	PingTan Macau Challenge	2025 SRO GT Cup is located in China
3	(China) Beijing Street Circuit, Beijing	17–19 October	GT World Challenge Asia	2025 SRO GT Cup is located in China
4	Guia Circuit, Macau Peninsula, Macau	13–16 November	FIA FR World Cup; FIA F4 World Cup; FIA GT World Cup; Macau Motorcycle Grand Prix; Macau Roadsport Challenge; TCR World Tour; TCR Australia Touring Car Series	2025 SRO GT Cup is located in China

== Entry list ==
Team	Car	Engine	No.	Drivers	Class	Rounds
(China) 610 Racing	Porsche 718 Cayman GT4 RS Clubsport	Porsche MDG 4.0 L Flat-6	007	(China) Xie Wenjun	Am	3
(China) 610 Racing	Porsche 718 Cayman GT4 RS Clubsport	Porsche MDG 4.0 L Flat-6	333	(China) Wang Yang	Am	1
(Hong Kong) Parkview Motorsports	Ginetta G55 GT4	Ford Cyclone 3.7 L V6	2	(Hong Kong) Brian Lai Chun-Kit	Am	1, 4
(Hong Kong) Parkview Motorsports	Ginetta G55 GT4	Ford Cyclone 3.7 L V6	83	(China) Liu Qiren	Am	1
(China) Team Pegasus	Lotus Emira GT4	Lotus 2GR-FE 3.6 L V6	3	(Hong Kong) Liu Kai-Shun	S	1, 4
(China) Team Pegasus	Lotus Emira GT4	Lotus 2GR-FE 3.6 L V6	3	(China) Huang Kuisheng (Note: Drivers of Cars No. 3 and No. 20 swapped numbers before the weekend, although is not reflected on the published entry list.)	Am	2
(China) Team Pegasus	Lotus Emira GT4	Lotus 2GR-FE 3.6 L V6	3	(China) Jonathan Harris	S	3
(China) Team Pegasus	Lotus Emira GT4	Lotus 2GR-FE 3.6 L V6	20	(China) Lu Wenlong	S	1, 3–4
(China) Team Pegasus	Lotus Emira GT4	Lotus 2GR-FE 3.6 L V6	20	(China) Li Zhiting	Am	2
(China) Team Pegasus	Lotus Emira GT4	Lotus 2GR-FE 3.6 L V6	75	(China) Luo Kailuo	S	1
(China) Team Pegasus	Lotus Emira GT4	Lotus 2GR-FE 3.6 L V6	75	(China) Wu Pei	Am	2
(China) Team Pegasus	Lotus Emira GT4	Lotus 2GR-FE 3.6 L V6	75	(China) Lu Wenhu	S	3
(Macau) RPM Racing Team	Ginetta G55 GT4	Ford Cyclone 3.7 L V6	4	(Macau) Lei Kit Meng	Am	2
(Macau) RPM Racing Team	Ginetta G55 GT4	Ford Cyclone 3.7 L V6	7	(Macau) Lei Kit Meng	Am	4
(Macau) RPM Racing Team	Ginetta G55 GT4	Ford Cyclone 3.7 L V6	77	(Macau) Lao Kim-Hou	Am	1–2, 4
(Macau) Son Veng Racing Team	BMW M4 GT4 (F82)	BMW N55 3.0 L Twin-Turbo I6	6	(Macau) Leong Ian Veng	Am	2, 4
(Hong Kong) Team TRC	BMW M4 GT4 (F82)	BMW N55 3.0 L Twin-Turbo I6	6	(Macau) Leong Ian Veng	Am	1
(Hong Kong) Team TRC	Mercedes-AMG GT4	Mercedes-AMG M178 4.0 L Twin-Turbo V8	12	(Hong Kong) Fok Wai-Ming	Am	4
(Hong Kong) Team TRC	Mercedes-AMG GT4	Mercedes-AMG M178 4.0 L Twin-Turbo V8	85	(Hong Kong) Fok Wai-Ming	Am	1
(Hong Kong) Team TRC	Mercedes-AMG GT4	Mercedes-AMG M178 4.0 L Twin-Turbo V8	22	(Hong Kong) Terence Tse Kin-Leung	Am	1
(Hong Kong) Team TRC	Mercedes-AMG GT4	Mercedes-AMG M178 4.0 L Twin-Turbo V8	36	(Hong Kong) Ying Kit-Lau	Am	1
(Hong Kong) Team TRC	Mercedes-AMG GT4	Mercedes-AMG M178 4.0 L Twin-Turbo V8	95	(Hong Kong) Darryl O'Young	S	2
(Hong Kong) Craft-Bamboo Racing	Mercedes-AMG GT4	Mercedes-AMG M178 4.0 L Twin-Turbo V8	95	(Hong Kong) Darryl O'Young	S	4
Toyota Gazoo Racing China	Toyota GR Supra GT4 Evo	BMW B58B30 3.0 L Twin-Turbo I6	7	(China) Yu Rao	Am	1, 3
Toyota Gazoo Racing China	Toyota GR Supra GT4 Evo	BMW B58B30 3.0 L Twin-Turbo I6	21	(China) Wang Hao	S	All
Toyota Gazoo Racing China	Toyota GR Supra GT4 Evo	BMW B58B30 3.0 L Twin-Turbo I6	803	(China) Cao Qikuan	Am	1
Toyota Gazoo Racing China	Toyota GR Supra GT4	BMW B58B30 3.0 L Twin-Turbo I6	27	(China) Cao Qikuan	Am	4
Toyota Gazoo Racing China	Toyota GR Supra GT4 Evo2	BMW B58B30 3.0 L Twin-Turbo I6	33	(China) Han Lichao	S	All
(China) Level Motorsports	Aston Martin Vantage AMR GT4 Evo	Aston Martin M177 4.0 L Twin-Turbo V8	10	(China) Chen Siyuan	Am	1
(China) Level Motorsports	Mercedes-AMG GT4	Mercedes-AMG M178 4.0 L Twin-Turbo V8	15	(Chinese Taipei) Chen Chun-Hua	Am	1, 4
(China) Level Motorsports	Mercedes-AMG GT4	Mercedes-AMG M178 4.0 L Twin-Turbo V8	58	(Chinese Taipei) Tsai Chang-Ta	Am	1–2, 4
(China) Level Motorsports	Mercedes-AMG GT4	Mercedes-AMG M178 4.0 L Twin-Turbo V8	99	(Hong Kong) Wong Wai-Hong	Am	1–2, 4
(China) Level Motorsports	Mercedes-AMG GT4	Mercedes-AMG M178 4.0 L Twin-Turbo V8	89	(Chinese Taipei) Kao Tzu Lung	S	2
(China) Level Motorsports	Toyota GR Supra GT4 Evo2	BMW B58B30 3.0 L Twin-Turbo I6	89	(Chinese Taipei) Kao Tzu Lung	S	4
(China) Level Motorsports	KTM X-Bow GT4 Evo	Audi TFSI 2.0 L Turbo I4	26	(Chinese Taipei) Chuang Chi-Shun	Am	1
(China) Level Motorsports	Audi R8 LMS GT4 Evo	Audi DAR 5.2 L V10	26	(Chinese Taipei) Chuang Chi-Shun	Am	2–3
(China) Level Motorsports	BMW M4 GT4 (F82)	BMW N55 3.0 L Twin-Turbo I6	26	(Chinese Taipei) Chuang Chi-Shun	Am	4
(China) Level Motorsports	KTM X-Bow GT4 Evo	Audi TFSI 2.0 L Turbo I4	38	(China) Liu Qiren	Am	4
(New Zealand) 778 autosport	Ginetta G55 GT4	Ford Cyclone 3.7 L V6	11	(Chinese Taipei) Kan Che Wei	Am	2
(New Zealand) 778 autosport	Ginetta G55 GT4	Ford Cyclone 3.7 L V6	67	(Chinese Taipei) Kan Che Wei	Am	4
(China) Harmony Racing	Audi R8 LMS GT4 Evo	Audi DAR 5.2 L V10	16	(China) Zhang Huilin	Am	3
(China) Harmony Racing	Audi R8 LMS GT4 Evo	Audi DAR 5.2 L V10	96	(China) Chen Weian	S	1
(China) Harmony Racing	BMW M4 GT4 (G82)	BMW S58B30T0 3.0 L Twin Turbo I6	131	(China) Ye Sichao	Am	1
(Macau) LW World Racing Team	McLaren 570S GT4	McLaren M838T 3.8 L Turbo V8	23	(Macau) Wong Cheng-Tou	Am	1–2, 4
(Macau) LW World Racing Team	McLaren 570S GT4	McLaren M838T 3.8 L Turbo V8	29	(Macau) Ip Un-Hou	Am	1–2, 4
(Macau) LW World Racing Team	Audi R8 LMS GT4 Evo	Audi DAR 5.2 L V10	81	(Macau) Miguel Lei	Am	1–2, 4
(China) PAR By 300+ Racing	Mercedes-AMG GT4	Mercedes-AMG M178 4.0 L Twin-Turbo V8	66	(Hong Kong) Yang Kaiwen	S	1
(China) 300+	Mercedes-AMG GT4	Mercedes-AMG M178 4.0 L Twin-Turbo V8	36	(Hong Kong) Yang Kaiwen	S	4
(China) 300+	Mercedes-AMG GT4	Mercedes-AMG M178 4.0 L Twin-Turbo V8	35	(China) Lu Jianxi	Am	2
(China) 300+	Mercedes-AMG GT4	Mercedes-AMG M178 4.0 L Twin-Turbo V8	555	(Hong Kong) Zhou Liyuan	Am	3
(Hong Kong) K2C Motorsports	Ginetta G55 GT4	Ford Cyclone 3.7 L V6	55	(Hong Kong) Kenny Chung Wing-Keung	Am	1–2, 4
(China) Incipient Racing	Audi R8 LMS GT4 Evo	Audi DAR 5.2 L V10	69	(China) Yu Tong	S	1
(China) Incipient Racing	Porsche 718 Cayman GT4 RS Clubsport	Porsche MDG 4.0 L Flat-6	650	(China) Wu Zhenlong	Am	1
(Germany) W&S Motorsport	Porsche 718 Cayman GT4 RS Clubsport	Porsche MDG 4.0 L Flat-6	83	(Germany) Moritz Berrenberg	Am	4
(Germany) W&S Motorsport	Porsche 718 Cayman GT4 RS Clubsport	Porsche MDG 4.0 L Flat-6	927	(Germany) Moritz Berrenberg	Am	1–3
(Chinese Taipei) YIH-SVN Racing	Aston Martin AMR Vantage GT4 Evo	Aston Martin M177 4.0 L Twin-Turbo V8	87	(Chinese Taipei) Yang Meng Chiao	Am	2–4
(China) RSR GT Racing	Porsche 718 Cayman GT4 RS Clubsport	Porsche MDG 4.0 L Flat-6	222	(China) Jiang Ruxi	Am	1
(China) RSR GT Racing	Porsche 718 Cayman GT4 RS Clubsport	Porsche MDG 4.0 L Flat-6	777	(China) Lenny Tian Weiyuan	Am	1, 3
(China) Ultimate Racing	Porsche 718 Cayman GT4 RS Clubsport	Porsche MDG 4.0 L Flat-6	718	(China) Yang Chunlei	Am	1
(China) Lifeng Racing Team	Audi R8 LMS GT4 Evo	Audi DAR 5.2 L V10	924	(China) Xiao Meng	Am	3
Ref:

Icon	Class
Drivers
S	Silver Cup
Am	Am Cup

== Race results ==
Bold indicates overall winner

Round		Circuit	Pole position	Silver Winner	Am Winner
1	R1	(China) Shanghai	(China) No. 20 Team Pegasus	(China) No. 96 Harmony Winhere Racing	(Germany) No. 927 W&S Motorsport
1	R1	(China) Shanghai	(China) Lu Wenlong	(China) Chen Weian	(Germany) Moritz Berrenberg
1	R2	(China) Shanghai	(China) No. 20 Team Pegasus	No. 33 Toyota Gazoo Racing China	(Germany) No. 927 W&S Motorsport
1	R2	(China) Shanghai	(China) Lu Wenlong	(China) Han Lichao	(Germany) Moritz Berrenberg
2	R1	(China) Pingtan	No. 33 Toyota Gazoo Racing China	No. 33 Toyota Gazoo Racing China	(China) No. 26 Level Motorsports
2	R1	(China) Pingtan	(China) Han Lichao	(China) Han Lichao	(China) Chuang Chishun
2	R2	(China) Pingtan	No. 33 Toyota Gazoo Racing China	No. 33 Toyota Gazoo Racing China	(China) No. 26 Level Motorsports
2	R2	(China) Pingtan	(China) Han Lichao	(China) Han Lichao	(China) Chuang Chishun
3	R1	(China) Beijing	No. 33 Toyota Gazoo Racing China	(China) No. 20 Team Pegasus	(Germany) No. 927 W&S Motorsport
3	R1	(China) Beijing	(China) Han Lichao	(China) Lu Wenlong	(Germany) Moritz Berrenberg
3	R2	(China) Beijing		No. 33 Toyota Gazoo Racing China	(Germany) No. 927 W&S Motorsport
3	R2	(China) Beijing		(China) Han Lichao	(Germany) Moritz Berrenberg
4		Macau	No. 33 Toyota Gazoo Racing China	(China) No. 20 Team Pegasus	(Macau) No. 6 Son Veng Racing Team
4		Macau	(China) Han Lichao	(China) Lu Wenlong	(Macau) Leong Ian Veng

== Championship standings ==
Scoring system

Championship points are awarded for the first ten positions in each race. Entries are required to complete 75% of the winning car's race distance in order to be classified and earn points.

Position	**1st**	**2nd**	**3rd**	**4th**	**5th**	**6th**	**7th**	**8th**	**9th**	**10th**
Points	25	18	15	12	10	8	6	4	2	1

=== Drivers' championship ===
==== Overall ====
Pos.	Driver	Team	SHA (China)		PIN (China)		BEJ (China)		MAC (Macau)	Points
1	(China) Han Lichao	Toyota Gazoo Racing China	4	1	**1**	**1**	**10**	1	**2**	131
2	(China) Lu Wenlong	(China) Team Pegasus	**2**	**31†**			1	5	1	78
3	(Germany) Moritz Berrenberg	(Germany) W&S Motorsport	6	4	5	4	2	2	Ret	78
4	(China) Wang Hao	Toyota Gazoo Racing China	Ret	14	4	7	4	3	6	53
5	(China) Chen Weian	(China) Harmony Racing	1	2						43
6	(Hong Kong) Liu Kai-Shun	(China) Team Pegasus	5	3					3	40
7	(Chinese Taipei) Chuang Shi-Shun	(China) Level Motorsports	10	9	3	3	3	Ret	7	39
8	(Hong Kong) Kao Tzu Lung	(China) Team Pegasus			2	5			5	38
9	(Macau) Leong Ian-Veng	(Hong Kong) Team TRC	Ret	11						24
9	(Macau) Leong Ian-Veng	(Macau) Son Veng Racing Team			6	8			4	24
10	(China) Yu Rao	Toyota Gazoo Racing China	12	7			6	8		18
11	(China) Cao Qikuan	Toyota Gazoo Racing China	7	6					8	18
12	(Chinese Taipei) Yang Meng Chiao	(Chinese Taipei) YIH-SVN Racing			9	18	7	6		18
12	(Chinese Taipei) Yang Meng Chiao	(China) Level Motorsports							9	18
13	(Hong Kong) Darryl O'Young	(Hong Kong) Team TRC			Ret	2				15
13	(Hong Kong) Darryl O'Young	(Hong Kong) Craft-Bamboo Racing							Ret	15
14	(China) Luo Kailuo	(China) Team Pegasus	3	Ret						15
15	(China) Lu Wenhu	(China) Team Pegasus					DSQ	4		12
16	(China) Jonathan Harris	(China) Team Pegasus					5	9		12
17	(China) Huang Kuiseng	(China) Team Pegasus			8	7				10
18	(China) Ye Sichao	(China) Harmony Racing	27	5						10
19	(Chinese Taipei) Tsai Chang-Ta	(China) Level Motorsports	16	13	7	9			17	8
20	(China) Zhou Liyuan	(China) 300+					Ret	7		6
21	(China) Zhang Huilin	(China) Harmony Racing					8	10		5
22	(China) Yang Chunlei	(China) Ultimate Racing	8	16						4
23	(China) Wang Yang	(China) 610 Racing	Ret	8						4
24	(Chinese Taipei) Chen Chun-Hua	(China) Level Motorsports	9	10					Ret	3
25	(China) Xiao Meng	(China) Lifeng racing Team					9	11		2
26	(China) Lu Jianxi	(China) 300+			10	10				2
27	(Hong Kong) Wong Wai-Hong	(China) Level Motorsports	24	21	11	13			10	0
—	(Macau) Miguel Lei	(Macau) LW World Racing Team	19	30	13	14			11	0
—	(China) Lenny Tian Weiyuan	(China) RSR GT Racing	14	15			11	DNS		0
—	(Macau) Lei Kit Meng	(Macau) RPM Racing Team			17	11			15	0
—	(China) Yu Tong	(China) Incipient Racing	11	19						0
—	(Macau) Wong Cheng-Tou	(Macau) LW World Racing Team	26	28	12	17			13	0
—	(Macau) Ip Un-Hou	(Macau) LW World Racing Team	23	22	14	15			12	0
—	(Macau) Lao Kim Hou	(Macau) RPM Racing Team			Ret	12			18	0
—	(China) Jiang Ruxi	(China) RSR GT Racing	Ret	12						0
—	(Hong Kong) Yang Kaiwen	(China) PAR By 300+ Racing	13	20					16	0
—	(China) Wu Pei	(China) Team Pegasus			15	Ret				0
—	(Hong Kong) Brian Lai Chun-Kit	(Hong Kong) Parkview Motorsports	15	29					Ret	0
—	(Hong Kong) Kenny Chung Wing-Keung	(Hong Kong) K2C Motorsports	21	18	16	16			Ret	0
—	(China) Wu Zhenlong	(China) Incipient Racing	17	17						0
—	(China) Liu Qiren	(Hong Kong) Parkview Motorsports	18	30						0
—	(China) Liu Qiren	(China) Level Motorsports							Ret	0
—	(Chinese Taipei) Kan Che Wei	(New Zealand) 778 autosport			18	Ret			DNS	0
—	(Hong Kong) Ying Kit-Lau	(Hong Kong) Team TRC	20	27						0
—	(Hong Kong) Terence Tse Kin-Leung	(Hong Kong) Team TRC	22	24						0
—	(Macau) Lao Kim-Hou	(Macau) RPM Racing Team	25	26					18	0
—	(Hong Kong) Fok Wai-Ming	(Hong Kong) Team TRC	Ret	25					14	0
—	(China) Chen Siyuan	(China) Level Motorsports	Ret	Ret						0
—	(China) Li Zhiting	(China) Team Pegasus			Ret	Ret				0
Pos.	Driver	Team	SHA (China)		PIN (China)		BEJ (China)		MAC (Macau)	Points

Colour	Result
Gold	Winner
Silver	Second place
Bronze	Third place
Green	Points classification
Blue	Non-points classification
Blue	Non-classified finish (NC)
Purple	Retired, not classified (Ret)
Red	Did not qualify (DNQ)
Red	Did not pre-qualify (DNPQ)
Black	Disqualified (DSQ)
White	Did not start (DNS)
White	Withdrew (WD)
White	Race cancelled (C)
Blank	Did not practice (DNP)
Blank	Did not arrive (DNA)
Blank	Excluded (EX)

**Bold** – Pole

Italics – Fastest Lap

==== Silver Class ====
Pos.	Driver	Team	SHA (China)		PIN (China)		BEJ (China)		MAC (Macau)	Points
1	(China) Han Lichao	Toyota Gazoo Racing China	4	1	1	1	4	1	2	142
2	(China) Lu Wenlong	(China) Team Pegasus	2	7			1	4	1	86
3	(China) Wang Hao	Toyota Gazoo Racing China	Ret	4	3	4	2	2	5	85
4	(Hong Kong) Kao Tzu Lung	(China) Team Pegasus			2	3			4	45
5	(China) Chen Weian	(China) Harmony Racing	1	2						43
6	(Hong Kong) Liu Kai-Shun	(China) Team Pegasus	5	3					3	40
7	(China) Jonathan Harris	(China) Team Pegasus					3	5		25
8	(Hong Kong) Yang Kaiwen	(China) 300+ Racing	7	6					6	22
9	(Hong Kong) Darryl O'Young	(Hong Kong) Team TRC			Ret	2				18
9	(Hong Kong) Darryl O'Young	(Hong Kong) Craft-Bamboo Racing							Ret	18
10	(China) Yu Tong	(China) Incipient Racing	6	5						18
11	(China) Luo Kailuo	(China) Team Pegasus	3	Ret						15
12	(China) Lu Wenhu	(China) Team Pegasus					DSQ	3		15
Pos.	Driver	Team	SHA (China)		PIN (China)		BEJ (China)		MAC (Macau)	Points

==== Am Class ====
Pos.	Driver	Team	SHA (China)		PIN (China)		BEJ (China)		MAC (Macau)	Points
1	(Germany) Moritz Berrenberg	(Germany) W&S Motorsport	1	1	2	2	1	1	Ret	136
2	(Chinese Taipei) Chuang Shi-Shun	(China) Level Motorsports	5	6	1	1	2	Ret	2	104
3	(Macau) Leong Ian-Veng	(Hong Kong) Team TRC	Ret	8						56
3	(Macau) Leong Ian-Veng	(Macau) Son Veng Racing Team			3	4			1	56
4	(Chinese Taipei) Yang Meng Chiao	(Chinese Taipei) YIH-SVN Racing			6	14	4	2		50
4	(Chinese Taipei) Yang Meng Chiao	(China) Level Motorsports							4	50
5	(China) Cao Qikuan	Toyota Gazoo Racing China	2	3					3	48
6	(China) Yu Rao	Toyota Gazoo Racing China	6	4			3	4		47
7	(China) Huang Kuiseng	(China) Team Pegasus			5	3				25
8	(Chinese Taipei) Tsai Chang-Ta	(China) Level Motorsports	9	10	4	5			11	25
9	(China) Zhang Huilin	(China) Harmony Racing					5	5		20
10	(China) Ye Sichao	(China) Harmony Racing	20	2						18
11	(Chinese Taipei) Chen Chun-Hua	(China) Level Motorsports	4	7					Ret	18
12	(Hong Kong) Wong Wai-Hong	(China) Level Motorsports	17	16	8	9			5	16
13	(China) Yang Chunlei	(China) Ultimate Racing	3	12						15
14	(China) Zhou Liyuan	(China) 300+					Ret	3		15
15	(China) Lenny Tian Weiyuan	(China) RSR GT Racing	7	11			6	DNS		14
16	(China) Lu Jianxi	(China) 300+ Racing			7	6				14
17	(China) Wang Yang	(China) 610 Racing	Ret	5						10
18	(Macau) Miguel Lei	(Macau) LW World Racing Team	12	18	10	10			6	10
19	(Macau) Lei Kit Meng	(Macau) RPM Racing Team			14	7			10	7
20	(Macau) Ip Un-Hou	(Macau) LW World Racing Team	16	17	11	11			7	6
23	(Macau) Wong Cheng-Tou	(Macau) LW World Racing Team	19	23	9	13			8	6
21	(Hong Kong) Brian Lai Chun-Kit	(Hong Kong) Parkview Motorsports	8	24					Ret	4
22	(Macau) Lao Kim Hou	(Macau) RPM Racing Team			Ret	8			12	4
24	(Hong Kong) Fok Wai-Ming	(Hong Kong) Team TRC	Ret	20					9	2
25	(China) Jiang Ruxi	(China) RSR GT Racing	Ret	9						2
26	(China) Wu Zhenlong	(China) Incipient Racing	10	13						1
—	(China) Liu Qiren	(Hong Kong) Parkview Motorsports	11	25						0
—	(China) Liu Qiren	(China) Level Motorsports							Ret	0
—	(China) Wu Pei	(China) Team Pegasus			12	Ret				0
—	(Hong Kong) Ying Kit-Lau	(Hong Kong) Team TRC	13	22						0
—	(Hong Kong) Kenny Chung Wing-Keung	(Hong Kong) K2C Motorsports	14	14	13	12			Ret	0
—	(Hong Kong) Terence Tse Kin-Leung	(Hong Kong) Team TRC	15	19						0
—	(Chinese Taipei) Kan Che Wei	(New Zealand) 778 autosport			15	Ret			DNS	0
—	(China) Chen Siyuan	(China) Level Motorsports	Ret	Ret						0
—	(China) Li Zhiting	(China) Level Motorsports			Ret	Ret				0
Pos.	Driver	Team	SHA (China)		PIN (China)		BEJ (China)		MAC (Macau)	Points

== See also ==
- 2025 British GT Championship
- 2025 GT4 European Series
- 2025 French GT4 Cup
- 2025 GT4 America Series
- 2025 GT4 Australia Series
- 2025 SRO Japan Cup
