= Picariello =

Picariello is an Italian surname. Notable people with the surname include:

- Alessio Picariello (born 1993), Belgian racing driver
- Emilio Picariello (1875 or 1879–1923), Italian-Canadian bootlegger and murderer
