= Deng Yi (racing driver) =

Chinese racing driver (born 2001)

- 邓亿
- Born: Deng Yi; 28 April 2002 (age 24); Yantai, China
- Nationality: (China) Chinese
- Categorisation: FIA Silver

Deng Yi (Chinese: 邓亿; pinyin: Dèng Yì; born 28 April 2002), also known as Andy Deng, is a Chinese racing driver who last competed for Winhere Harmony Racing in GT World Challenge Asia.

== Career ==
Deng made his car racing debut in 2023, racing in the GT4 category of the GT Super Sprint Challenge for Shengdi Racing by HAR. In his maiden season in the series, Deng finished runner-up in the standings three wins to his name, as well as making his GT3 debut at season's end and winning twice on his first outing. During 2023, Deng also raced in the China Endurance Championship for Winhere Motorsports between GT3 and GT4 machinery, taking a win in each category in his maiden foray into endurance racing alongside Xu Zheyu.

Stepping up to GT3 competition full-time in 2024, Deng joined Winhere By B-Quik Absolute Racing to compete in Thailand-based TSS The Super Series, sharing an Audi R8 LMS Evo II with Sandy Stuvik. In his first season in the series, Deng won at the Bangsaen Street Circuit and took five other podiums en route to runner-up honours in the GT3 standings. In parallel, Deng also competed in the GT Sprint Challenge and China Endurance Championships for Winhere Racing, in which he won in all of his starts. Towards the end of the year, Deng won the Shanghai 8 Hours in GT3 Pro-Am, as well as making his debut at the Greater Bay Area GT Cup at Macau, where he qualified on pole.

In 2025, Deng made his international debut in the Middle East Trophy for Audi-aligned Tresor Attempto Racing. For the rest of the year, Deng reunited with Winhere Harmony Racing to drive a Ferrari 296 GT3 in GT World Challenge Asia alongside Chen Weian and Luo Kailuo. In his maiden season in the series, Deng took an overall win at Okayama alongside Luo, as well as Silver class wins at Mandalika and Fuji to take fourth in points. During 2025, Deng joined Toyota-fielding Prime Racing to make his Super Taikyu debut at Suzuka, before competing at the Suzuka 1000 km later that year for Audi Sport Asia Team Phantom. At the end of the year, Deng returned to Winhere Motorsports to compete in the FIA GT World Cup at Macau, finishing eighth in his first appearance at the event ahead of Laurens Vanthoor. At the end of the year, Deng competed in the full 2025–26 24H Series Middle East season in Porsche machinery, splitting his campaign between Absolute Racing and Origine Motorsport.

For the rest of 2026, Deng returned to Ferrari-affiliated Winhere Harmony Racing for his second season in GT World Challenge Asia, this time alongside Liu Kaishun. Racing with the team through the first two rounds of the season, Deng scored a lone Silver class win at Sepang before leaving the series.

== Racing record ==
=== Racing career summary ===
| Season | Series | Team | Races | Wins | Poles | F/Laps | Podiums | Points | Position |
|---|---|---|---|---|---|---|---|---|---|
| 2023 | GT Super Sprint Challenge – GT4 | Shengdi Racing by HAR | 4 | 3 | | | 4 | 93 | **2nd** |
| 2023 | GT Super Sprint Challenge – GT3 | Shengdi Racing by HAR | 2 | 2 | | | 2 | 50 | 6th |
| 2023 | China Endurance Championship – GT4 | Winhere Motorsports | 1 | 0 | | | 1 | | |
| 2023 | China Endurance Championship – GT4 | Winhere Racing by HAR | 1 | 1 | | | 1 | | |
| 2023 | China Endurance Championship – GT3 | Winhere Racing by HAR | 1 | 1 | | | 1 | | |
| 2024 | GT Sprint Challenge – GT3 Pro | Winhere Racing by HAR | 4 | 4 | | | 4 | | |
| 2024 | China Endurance Championship – GT3 Am | Winhere Racing by HAR | 1 | 1 | | | 1 | | |
| 2024 | Shanghai 8 Hours – GT3 Pro-Am | Winhere Racing by HAR | 1 | 1 | 0 | 0 | 1 | —N/a | **1st** |
| 2024 | TSS The Super Series – GT3 | Winhere By B-Quik Absolute Racing | 10 | 1 | 0 | 0 | 5 | 146 | **2nd** |
| 2024 | Greater Bay Area GT Cup | Winhere Motorsports | 1 | 0 | 1 | 0 | 0 | —N/a | DNF |
| 2025 | Middle East Trophy – GT3 Pro | Tresor Attempto Racing | 1 | 0 | 0 | 0 | 0 | 8 | NC |
| 2025 | China GT Championship – GT3 | Winhere Harmony Racing | 4 | 1 | 0 | 0 | 3 | 71 | **3rd** |
| 2025 | GT World Challenge Asia | Winhere Harmony Racing | 11 | 1 | 4 | 0 | 2 | 65 | 12th |
| 2025 | GT World Challenge Asia – Silver | Winhere Harmony Racing | 11 | 3 | 5 | 0 | 7 | 165 | 4th |
| 2025 | Shanghai 8 Hours – GT3 Pro-Am | Winhere Harmony Racing | 1 | 0 | 0 | 0 | 1 | —N/a | **3rd** |
| 2025 | TSS The Super Series – GT3 | Winhere By B-Quik Absolute Racing | 2 | 1 | 0 | 0 | 2 | 43 | 8th |
| 2025 | Super Taikyu – ST-Z | Prime Racing | 1 | 0 | 0 | 0 | 0 | 7.5‡ | 12th‡ |
| 2025 | Suzuka 1000 km – Silver | Audi Sport Asia Team Phantom | 1 | 0 | 0 | 0 | 0 | —N/a | NC |
| 2025 | FIA GT World Cup | Winhere Motorsports | 1 | 0 | 0 | 0 | 0 | —N/a | 8th |
| 2025–26 | 24H Series Middle East – GT3 | B-Quik Absolute Racing | 1 | 0 | 0 | 0 | 0 | 28 | 15th |
| 2025–26 | 24H Series Middle East – GT3 | Origine Motorsport | 1 | 0 | 0 | 0 | 0 | 28 | 15th |
| 2025–26 | 24H Series Middle East – GT3 | Origine powered by CC | 1 | 0 | 0 | 0 | 0 | 28 | 15th |
| 2026 | GT World Challenge Asia | Winhere Harmony Racing | 4 | 0 | 0 | 1 | 0 | 12 | 33rd |
| 2026 | GT World Challenge Asia – Silver | Winhere Harmony Racing | 4 | 1 | 1 | 1 | 2 | 53 | 7th |
| 2026 | China GT Championship – GT3 | Winhere Origine Motorsport | | | | | | | |

^{†} As Deng was a guest driver, he was ineligible for points.

^{‡} Team standings

=== Complete GT World Challenge Asia results ===
(key) (Races in bold indicate pole position) (Races in italics indicate fastest lap)

| Year | Team | Car | Class | 1 | 2 | 3 | 4 | 5 | 6 | 7 | 8 | 9 | 10 | 11 | 12 | DC | Points |
|---|---|---|---|---|---|---|---|---|---|---|---|---|---|---|---|---|---|
| 2025 | Winhere Harmony Racing | Ferrari 296 GT3 | Silver | SEP; 1; 2 | SEP; 2; 3 | MAN; 1; 1 | **MAN**; **2**; 3 | **BUR**; **1**; 2 | BUR; 2 Ret | **FUJ**; **1**; 4 | FUJ; 2; 1 | **OKA**; **1**; 1 | OKA; 2; 4 | **BEI**; **1** Ret | **BEI**; **2** DNS | 4th | 165 |
| 2026 | Winhere Harmony Racing | Ferrari 296 GT3 Evo | Silver | SEP; 1 Ret | SEP; 2; 1 | MAN; 1; 5 | **MAN**; **2**; 2 | FUJ; 1 | FUJ; 2 | OKA; 1 | OKA; 2 | BEI; 1 | BEI; 2 | SHA; 1 | SHA; 2 | 7th | 53 |
