= SRO GT Cup =

Sports car racing series based in China

- Category: Grand Tourer (SRO GT4)
- Country: China
- Inaugural season: 2025
- GT classes: GT4
- Drivers: 33
- Teams: 16
- Official website: SRO GT Cup

The SRO GT Cup is a sports car racing series based in China organized by SRO Motorsports Group since 2025.

== History ==
The inaugural season of the SRO GT Cup was announced on December 20, 2024, with two race weekends confirmed at Shanghai (supporting the Chinese Grand Prix) and at the new-for-2025 Beijing E-Town Street Circuit (supporting GT World Challenge Asia). All races are held in China. On April 8, 2025, it was announced that the Pingtan Ruyi Lake International City Circuit (Chinese: 平潭如意湖国际城市赛道; pinyin: Píng tán rúyì hú guójì chéngshì sài dào) would replace the second round at Zhuhai International Circuit.

== Format ==
The race weekend consists of two 30 minute sprint races for one driver per car. Eligible manufacturers are able to compete for points in the GT4 Manufacturer Ranking.

== Classes ==
All drivers use GT4 cars and are split into two classes based on FIA driver categorisation, Silver Cup and Am Cup. Drivers that are FIA Silver and Bronze rated are eligible to compete.

== Champions ==
=== Overall ===
Year	Driver
2025	(China) Han Lichao

=== Silver ===
Year	Driver
2025	(China) Han Lichao

=== Am ===
Year	Driver
2025	(Germany) Moritz Berrenberg

== Circuits ==
- **Bold** denotes a circuit will be used in the 2026 season.

Number	Circuit	Rounds	Years
1	(China) **Shanghai International Circuit**	1	2025
1	(China) Pingtan Ruyi Lake International City Circuit	1	2025
1	(China) **Beijing E-Town Street Circuit**	1	2025–present
1	(Macau) Guia Circuit	1	2025
5	(China) **Zhuhai International Circuit**	0	2026
