= 2026 SRO GT Cup =

Sports car racing series edition

The 2026 SRO GT Cup was the second season of the SRO GT Cup, a Chinese sports car racing series for SRO GT4 cars organised by the SRO Motorsports Group. The season started on 14 March at Shanghai International Circuit and finished on 4 October at Beijing Street Circuit.

== Calendar ==
Round	Circuit	Date	Supporting	Map
1	(China) Shanghai International Circuit, Jiading, Shanghai	14–15 March	Formula One World Championship; F1 Academy; Porsche Carrera Cup Asia	2026 SRO GT Cup is located in China
2	(China) Zhuhai International Circuit, Xiangzhou District, Zhuhai	9–10 May	Macao Touring Car Series; Zhuhai Hong Kong Macao Touring Car Series	2026 SRO GT Cup is located in China
3	(China) Beijing Street Circuit, Beijing	3–4 October	GT World Challenge Asia	2026 SRO GT Cup is located in China
4	Guia Circuit, Macau	20-22 November	Macau Grand Prix	2026 SRO GT Cup is located in China
Cancelled Rounds				2026 SRO GT Cup is located in China
C1	(China) Shanghai International Circuit, Jiading, Shanghai	5–6 June	GT World Challenge Asia; China Endurance Championship	2026 SRO GT Cup is located in China
C2	(China) Shanghai International Circuit, Jiading, Shanghai	31 October–1 November	GT World Challenge Asia	2026 SRO GT Cup is located in China

== Entry list ==
Team	Car	Engine	No.	Drivers	Class	Rounds
(China) Level Motorsports	Mercedes-AMG GT4	Mercedes-AMG M178 4.0 L Turbo V8	1	(Hong Kong) Dylan Yip	S	2
(China) Level Motorsports	Mercedes-AMG GT4	Mercedes-AMG M178 4.0 L Turbo V8	15	(Chinese Taipei) Chen Chun-Hua	Am	1–2
(China) Level Motorsports	Mercedes-AMG GT4	Mercedes-AMG M178 4.0 L Turbo V8	58	(Chinese Taipei) Tsai Chang-Ta	Am	1–2
(China) Level Motorsports	BMW M4 GT4 (F82)	BMW N55 3.0 L Turbo I6	88	(Chinese Taipei) Ho Shu-Hsien	Am	1–2
(China) Level Motorsports	Toyota GR Supra GT4 Evo2	BMW B58B30 3.0 L Turbo I6	89	(Chinese Taipei) Kao Tzu-Lung	S	1–2
(China) Level Motorsports	BMW M4 GT4 (G82)	BMW N55 3.0 L Turbo I6	91	(Chinese Taipei) Ho Hao-Yi	Am	1–2
(Macau) Son Veng Racing Team	BMW M4 GT4 (G82)	BMW N55 3.0 L Turbo I6	6	(Macau) Leong Ian-Veng	Am	2
Toyota Gazoo Racing China	Toyota GR Supra GT4 Evo2	BMW B58B30 3.0 L Turbo I6	7	(China) Yu Rao	Am	1–2
Toyota Gazoo Racing China	Toyota GR Supra GT4 Evo2	BMW B58B30 3.0 L Turbo I6	21	(China) Wang Hao	Am	1–2
Toyota Gazoo Racing China	Toyota GR Supra GT4 Evo2	BMW B58B30 3.0 L Turbo I6	33	(China) Han Lichao	S	1–2
Toyota Gazoo Racing China	Toyota GR Supra GT4 Evo2	BMW B58B30 3.0 L Turbo I6	018	(China) Huang Kuisheng	S	1–2
(Hong Kong) Team TRC	Mercedes-AMG GT4	Mercedes-AMG M178 4.0 L Turbo V8	12	(Hong Kong) Fok Wai-Ming	Am	2
(Hong Kong) Team TRC	Mercedes-AMG GT4	Mercedes-AMG M178 4.0 L Turbo V8	31	(Hong Kong) Fok Wai-Ming	Am	1
(Hong Kong) Team TRC	Mercedes-AMG GT4	Mercedes-AMG M178 4.0 L Turbo V8	18	(Hong Kong) Kevin Tse	Am	2
(China) Morgan Team TDK	Mercedes-AMG GT4	Mercedes-AMG M178 4.0 L Turbo V8	13	(Hong Kong) Tang Yu-Ching		2
(China) Morgan Team TDK	Audi R8 LMS GT4 Evo	Audi DAR 5.2 L V10	36	(Macau) Lo Kai-Fung	Am	2
(China) Morgan Team TDK	Audi R8 LMS GT4 Evo	Audi DAR 5.2 L V10	44	(Hong Kong) Chang Ka-Ping		2
(Macau) LW World Racing Team	McLaren 570S GT4	McLaren M838T 3.8 L Turbo V8	16	(Hong Kong) Maximiano Manhao		2
(Macau) LW World Racing Team	McLaren 570S GT4	McLaren M838T 3.8 L Turbo V8	23	(Macau) Wong Cheng-Tou	Am	2
(China) Team Pegasus	Lotus Emira GT4	Lotus 2GR-FE 3.5 L V6	20	(Hong Kong) Jonathan Harris	S	1
(China) Team Pegasus	Lotus Emira GT4	Lotus 2GR-FE 3.5 L V6	94	(China) Xu Weizhou	Am	1
(China) Starcars Racing	Mercedes-AMG GT4	Mercedes-AMG M178 4.0 L Turbo V8	28	(China) Ouyang Zhengwei	Am	1–2
(Hong Kong) K2C Motorsports	Ginetta G55 GT4	Ford Duratec 37 3.7 L V6	55	(Hong Kong) Kenny Chung Wing-Keung	Am	1–2
(China) PAR By 300+ Racing	Mercedes-AMG GT4	Mercedes-AMG M178 4.0 L Turbo V8	66	(China) Zhang Huilin	Am	1
(China) PAR By 300+ Racing	Mercedes-AMG GT4	Mercedes-AMG M178 4.0 L Turbo V8	66	(Hong Kong) Yang Kaiwen	S	2
(China) PAR By 300+ Racing	Audi R8 LMS GT4 Evo	Audi DAR 5.2 L V10	67	(China) Zou Sirui		2
(China) PAR By 300+ Racing	Audi R8 LMS GT4 Evo	Audi DAR 5.2 L V10	924	(China) Xiao Meng	Am	1–2
(China) Winhere Harmony Racing	Audi R8 LMS GT4 Evo	Audi DAR 5.2 L V10	68	(China) Zhang Hongyu	S	1
(China) KILOworks by Level Motorsports	Mercedes-AMG GT4	Mercedes-AMG M178 4.0 L Turbo V8	77	(China) Liang Jiatong	S	1
(Macau) RPM Racing Team	Ginetta G55 GT4	Ford Duratec 37 3.7 L V6	77	(Macau) Lao Kim-Hou	Am	2
(Hong Kong) Champ Motorsports	Ginetta G55 GT4	Ford Duratec 37 3.7 L V6	96	(Hong Kong) Ken Chow Wing-Hong	Am	2
(China) Climax Racing	Porsche 718 Cayman GT4 RS Clubsport	Porsche MDG.GA 4.0 L Flat-6	222	(China) Yin Jinchao	Am	1
(Germany) Maxmore W&S Motorsport	Porsche 718 Cayman GT4 RS Clubsport	Porsche MDG.GA 4.0 L Flat-6	927	(Germany) Moritz Berrenberg	Am	1–2

Icon	Class
Drivers
S	Silver Cup
Am	Am Cup

== Race results ==
Bold indicates overall winner

Round		Circuit	Pole position	Silver Winner	Am Winner
1	R1	(China) Shanghai	(China) No. 68 Winhere Harmony Racing	(China) No. 77 KILOworks by Level Motorsports	No. 21 Toyota Gazoo Racing China
1	R1	(China) Shanghai	(China) Zhang Hongyu	(China) Liang Jiatong	(China) Wang Hao
1	R2	(China) Shanghai	(China) No. 68 Winhere Harmony Racing	No. 33 Toyota Gazoo Racing China	(Germany) No. 927 Maxmore W&S Motorsport
1	R2	(China) Shanghai	(China) Zhang Hongyu	(China) Han Lichao	(Germany) Moritz Berrenberg
2	R1	(China) Zhuhai	No. 33 Toyota Gazoo Racing China	No. 33 Toyota Gazoo Racing China	No. 21 Toyota Gazoo Racing China
2	R1	(China) Zhuhai	(China) Han Lichao	(China) Han Lichao	(China) Wang Hao
2	R2	(China) Zhuhai	No. 018 Toyota Gazoo Racing China	No. 33 Toyota Gazoo Racing China	No. 21 Toyota Gazoo Racing China
2	R2	(China) Zhuhai	(China) Huang Kuisheng	(China) Han Lichao	(China) Wang Hao
3	R1	(China) Beijing			
3	R2	(China) Beijing			
4		Macau			

== Championship standings ==
Scoring system

Championship points are awarded for the first ten positions in each race. Entries are required to complete 75% of the winning car's race distance in order to be classified and earn points.

Position	**1st**	**2nd**	**3rd**	**4th**	**5th**	**6th**	**7th**	**8th**	**9th**	**10th**
Points	25	18	15	12	10	8	6	4	2	1

=== Drivers' championship ===
==== Overall ====
Pos.	Driver	Team	SHA (China)		ZHU (China)	SHA (China)	BEI (China)	TBC (China)	Points
1	(China) Han Lichao	Toyota Gazoo Racing China	2	1					43
2	(China) Liang Jiatong	(China) KILOworks by Level Motorsports	1	3					40
3	(China) Zhang Hongyu	(China) Winhere Harmony Racing	**4**	**2**					30
4	(Chinese Taipei) Kao Tzu-Lung	(China) Level Motorsports	7	4					18
5	(Hong Kong) Jonathan Harris	(China) Team Pegasus	5	6					18
6	(China) Huang Kuisheng	Toyota Gazoo Racing China	3	16					15
7	(Germany) Moritz Berrenberg	(Germany) Maxmore W&S Motorsport	14	5					8
8	(China) Wang Hao	Toyota Gazoo Racing China	6	15					8
9	(Chinese Taipei) Ho Shu-Hsien	(China) Level Motorsports	10	7					7
10	(Chinese Taipei) Ho Hao-Yi	(China) Level Motorsports	11	8					4
11	(Chinese Taipei) Chen Chun-Hua	(China) Level Motorsports	8	18					4
12	(Chinese Taipei) Tsai Chang-Ta	(China) Level Motorsports	12	9					2
13	(China) Yu Rao	Toyota Gazoo Racing China	9	17					2
14	(China) Xiao Meng	(China) PAR By 300+ Racing	13	10					1
—	(China) Yin Jinchao	(China) Climax Racing	16	11					0
—	(China) Ouyang Zhengwei	(China) Starcars Racing	17	12					0
—	(Hong Kong) Kenny Chung Wing Keung	(Hong Kong) K2C Motorsports	18	13					0
—	(China) Xu Weizhou	(China) Team Pegasus	15	14					0
—	(China) Zhang Huilin	(China) PAR By 300+ Racing	Ret	Ret					0
—	(Hong Kong) Fok Wai Ming	(Hong Kong) Team TRC	DNS	Ret					0
Pos.	Driver	Team	SHA (China)		ZHU (China)	SHA (China)	BEI (China)	TBC (China)	Points

Colour	Result
Gold	Winner
Silver	Second place
Bronze	Third place
Green	Points classification
Blue	Non-points classification
Blue	Non-classified finish (NC)
Purple	Retired, not classified (Ret)
Red	Did not qualify (DNQ)
Red	Did not pre-qualify (DNPQ)
Black	Disqualified (DSQ)
White	Did not start (DNS)
White	Withdrew (WD)
White	Race cancelled (C)
Blank	Did not practice (DNP)
Blank	Did not arrive (DNA)
Blank	Excluded (EX)

**Bold** – Pole

Italics – Fastest Lap

==== Silver Class ====
Pos.	Driver	Team	SHA (China)		ZHU (China)	SHA (China)	BEI (China)	TBC (China)	Points
1	(China) Han Lichao	Toyota Gazoo Racing China	2	1					43
2	(China) Liang Jiatong	(China) KILOworks by Level Motorsports	1	3					40
3	(China) Zhang Hongyu	(China) Winhere Harmony Racing	4	2					30
4	(China) Huang Kuisheng	Toyota Gazoo Racing China	3	6					23
5	(Chinese Taipei) Kao Tzu-Lung	(China) Level Motorsports	6	4					20
6	(Hong Kong) Jonathan Harris	(China) Team Pegasus	5	5					20
Pos.	Driver	Team	SHA (China)		ZHU (China)	SHA (China)	BEI (China)	TBC (China)	Points

==== Am Class ====
Pos.	Driver	Team	SHA (China)		ZHU (China)	SHA (China)	BEI (China)	TBC (China)	Points
1	(Chinese Taipei) Ho Shu-Hsien	(China) Level Motorsports	4	2					30
2	(Germany) Moritz Berrenberg	(Germany) Maxmore W&S Motorsport	8	1					29
3	(China) Wang Hao	Toyota Gazoo Racing China	1	10					26
4	(Chinese Taipei) Ho Hao-Yi	(China) Level Motorsports	5	3					25
5	(Chinese Taipei) Tsai Chang-Ta	(China) Level Motorsports	6	4					20
6	(Chinese Taipei) Chen Chun-Hua	(China) Level Motorsports	2	12					18
7	(China) Xiao Meng	(China) PAR By 300+ Racing	7	5					16
8	(China) Yu Rao	Toyota Gazoo Racing China	3	11					15
9	(China) Yin Jinchao	(China) Climax Racing	10	6					9
10	(China) Ouyang Zhengwei	(China) Starcars Racing	11	7					6
11	(Hong Kong) Kenny Chung Wing Keung	(Hong Kong) K2C Motorsports	12	8					4
12	(China) Xu Weizhou	(China) Team Pegasus	9	9					4
—	(China) Zhang Huilin	(China) PAR By 300+ Racing	Ret	Ret					0
—	(Hong Kong) Fok Wai Ming	(Hong Kong) Team TRC	DNS	Ret					0
Pos.	Driver	Team	SHA (China)		ZHU (China)	SHA (China)	BEI (China)	TBC (China)	Points

== See also ==
- 2026 British GT Championship
- 2026 GT4 European Series
- 2026 French GT4 Cup
- 2026 GT4 Italian Series
- 2026 GT4 America Series
- 2026 GT4 Australia Series
- 2026 SRO Japan Cup
