= Alessio Picariello =

Belgian racing driver (born 1993)

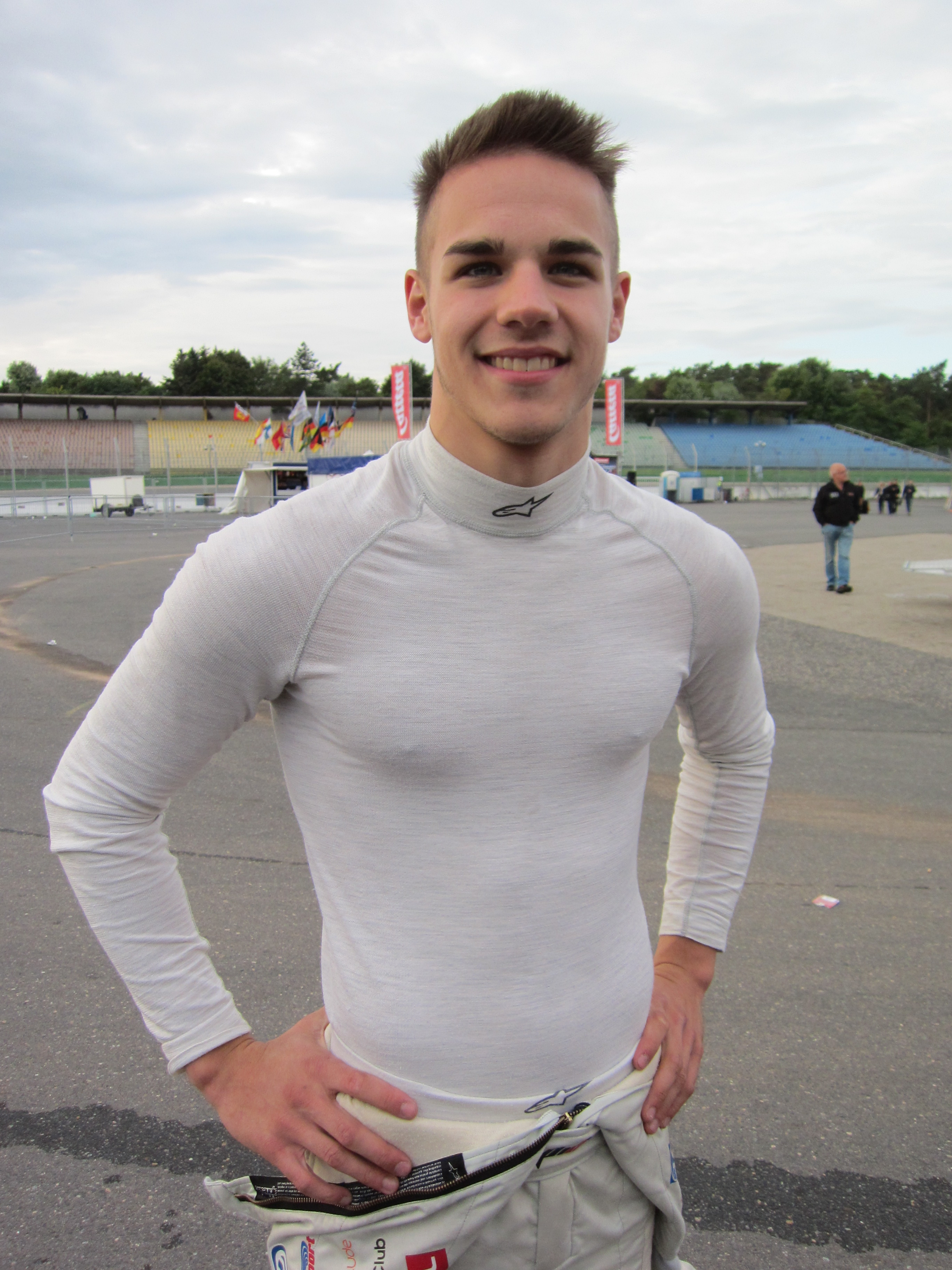
- Picariello at the Hockenheimring in 2013
- Nationality: (Belgium) Belgian
- Born: Alessio Clemente Picariello; 27 August 1993 (age 33) Gosselies, Belgium

Blancpain GT World Challenge Asia career
- Debut season: 2012
- Current team: Craft-Bamboo Racing
- Categorisation: FIA Silver (until 2020); FIA Gold (2021–)
- Car number: 15
- Starts: 42
- Wins: 7
- Poles: 4
- Fastest laps: 2
- Best finish: 1st in 2013

Championship titles
- 2013 2017 2020, 2023 2025: ADAC Formel Masters; Audi R8 LMS Cup; European Le Mans Series; GT World Challenge Europe Endurance Cup

Alessio Clemente Picariello (born 27 August 1993) is a Belgian racing driver. He is an overall GT World Challenge Europe Endurance Cup champion, winning the title in 2025 for Rutronik Racing, and raced in IMSA's GTP class for Proton Competition. Picariello previously won the ADAC Formel Masters in 2013, the Audi R8 LMS Cup in 2017 and the European Le Mans Series' GTE class in 2020 and 2023. He is a Porsche contracted driver.

Picariello was born in Belgium to an Italian father.

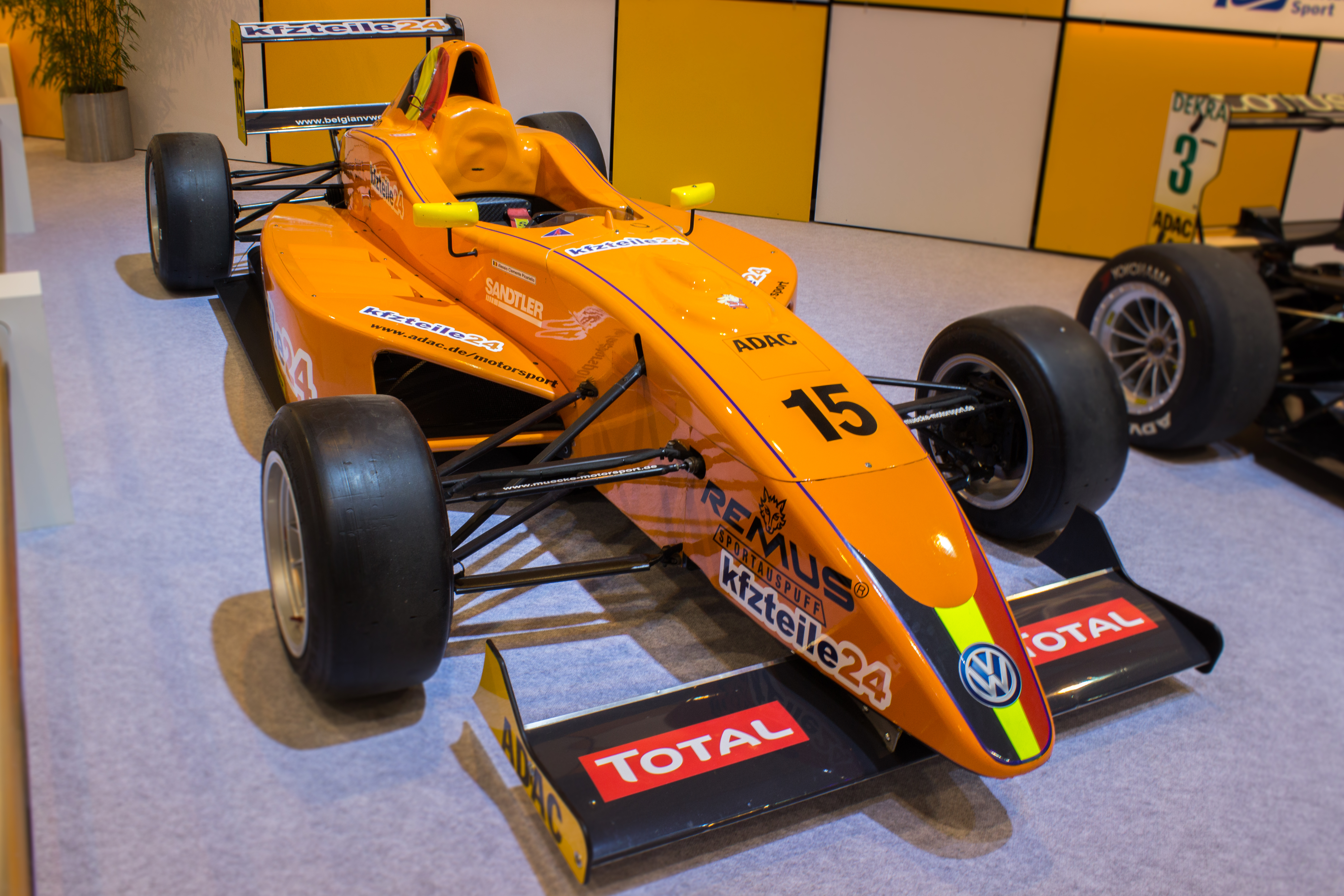
The Mücke Motorsport car Picariello drove to the 2013 ADAC Formel Masters title

Picariello at the 2022 24 Hours of Le Mans

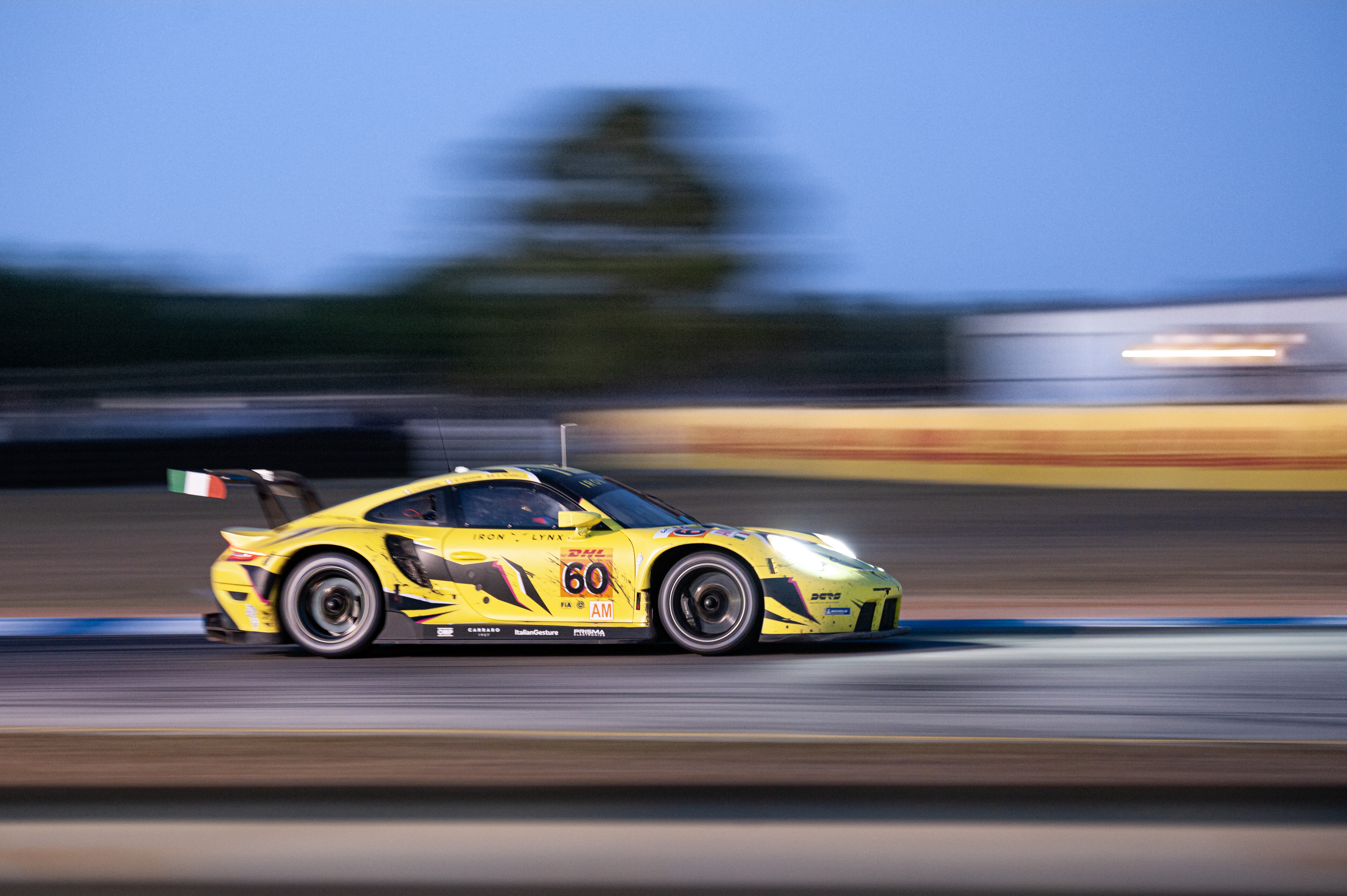
Picariello at the 2023 1000 Miles of Sebring

== Racing Record ==
=== Career summary ===
Season	Series	Team	Races	Wins	Poles	F/Laps	Podiums	Points	Position
2010	Formula Renault 2.0 NEC - FR2000	SL Formula Racing	6	3	0	0	4	142	8th
2011	Formula Renault 2.0 NEC	SL Formula Racing	20	0	0	0	2	209	6th
2012	Formula Renault 2.0 NEC	SL Formula Racing	10	0	1	1	3	120	15th
2012	ADAC Formel Masters	G&J/Schiler Motorsport	23	2	1	1	5	152	6th
2013	ADAC Formel Masters	ADAC Berlin-Brandenburg e.V.	24	12	5	6	16	388	**1st**
2014	Formula Acceleration 1	Acceleration Team France	6	0	0	1	0	34	8th
2015	Formula Masters China	Absolute Racing	9	5	3	3	8	126	4th
2015	Audi R8 LMS Cup China	ams Racing Team	2	0	0	0	0	24	14th
2015–16	MRF Challenge Formula 2000 Championship	MRF Racing	10	5	3	6	6	181	4th
2015–16	Asian Le Mans Series - GT	Absolute Racing	3	1	0	0	2	50	5th
2016	Blancpain GT Series Sprint Cup	Phoenix Racing	4	0	0	0	0	8	21st
2016	Audi R8 LMS Cup China	MGT Team by Absolute	12	1	2	0	7	166	**2nd**
2016–17	Asian Le Mans Series - GT	Absolute Racing	1	0	0	0	0	10	14th
2017	ADAC GT Masters	BWT Mücke Motorsport	2	0	0	0	0	10	34th
2017	Blancpain GT Series Asia	J-Fly by Absolute Racing	10	0	3	0	1	46	12th
2017	Audi R8 LMS Cup	MGT Team by Absolute	10	4	3	5	7	178	**1st**
2017	GT4 European Series Northern Cup - Silver	PROsport Performance	2	1	0	0	1	33	18th
2018	ADAC GT Masters	Montaplast by Land-Motorsport	6	0	0	0	0	8	34th
2018	IMSA SportsCar Championship - GTD	Montaplast by Land-Motorsport	1	0	0	0	0	28	50th
2018	Blancpain GT Series Sprint Cup	Belgian Audi Club Team WRT	2	0	0	0	0	7.5	20th
2018	Blancpain GT Series Asia - GT3	Absolute Racing	4	0	0	0	2	36	18th
2018	China GT Championship	Kings Racing	8	5	7	2	6	143	**3rd**
2018	Super Taikyu - ST-X	J-Fly Racing by Phoenix Racing Asia	2	0	0	0	1	71‡	5th‡
2018	Intercontinental GT Challenge	Audi Sport Team Hitotsuyama	1	0	0	0	0	4	23rd
2019	Blancpain GT World Challenge Asia - GT3	Craft-Bamboo Racing	10	2	2	3	3	68	11th
2019	China GT Championship	Craft-Bamboo Racing	10	2	1	3	7	144	**3rd**
2019	Super GT - GT300	Audi Team Hitotsuyama	2	0	0	0	0	0	NC
2019	Intercontinental GT Challenge	Audi Team Hitotsuyama	1	0	0	0	0	0	NC
2019	FIA GT World Cup	Mercedes-AMG Team Craft-Bamboo Racing	2	0	0	0	0	N/A	DNF
2019–20	FIA World Endurance Championship - LMGTE Am	Gulf Racing	1	0	0	0	0	15	24th
2020	European Le Mans Series - LMGTE	Proton Competition	5	2	1	1	4	99	**1st**
2020	Porsche Carrera Cup France	Martinet by Alméras	2	0	0	0	0	10	19th
2021	FIA World Endurance Championship - LMGTE Am	Dempsey-Proton Racing	2	0	0	0	0	18	17th
2021	24 Hours of Le Mans - LMGTE Am	Absolute Racing	1	0	0	0	0	N/A	7th
2021	24 Hours of Nürburgring - SP9	Falken Motorsports	1	0	0	0	0	N/A	4th
2022	European Le Mans Series - GTE	Absolute Racing	6	0	0	1	1	49	7th
2022	GT World Challenge Europe Endurance Cup	Porsche Zentrum Oberer Zürichsee by Herberth	2	0	0	0	0	40	8th
2022	GT World Challenge Europe Endurance Cup	Dinamic Motorsport	2	1	0	0	2	40	8th
2022	IMSA SportsCar Championship - GTD Pro	WeatherTech Racing	2	0	0	0	0	524	21st
2022	24 Hours of Le Mans - LMGTE Am	Hardpoint Motorsport	1	0	0	0	0	N/A	11th
2022	Nürburgring Endurance Series - SP9	Falken Motorsports	3	1	0	0	1	0	NC†
2022	24 Hours of Nürburgring - SP9	Falken Motorsports	1	0	0	0	0	N/A	DNF
2023	FIA World Endurance Championship - LMGTE Am	Iron Lynx	7	0	0	1	1	30	15th
2023	24 Hours of Le Mans - LMGTE Am	Iron Lynx	1	0	0	0	0	N/A	DNF
2023	European Le Mans Series - GTE	Proton Competition	6	2	2	1	5	105	**1st**
2023	GT World Challenge Asia - GT3	AAS Motorsport by Absolute Racing	8	0	3	0	4	95	6th
2023	Nürburgring Endurance Series - SP9	Falken Motorsports	2	0	0	0	0	0	NC†
2023	24 Hours of Nürburgring - SP9	Falken Motorsports	1	0	0	0	0	N/A	DNF
2023	FIA GT World Cup	Luanzhou International Circuit	1	0	0	0	0	N/A	8th
2024	IMSA SportsCar Championship - GTP	Proton Competition Mustang Sampling	4	0	0	0	0	1067	14th
2024	Intercontinental GT Challenge	The Bend Manthey EMA	1	0	0	0	0	20	13th
2024	Intercontinental GT Challenge	Falken Motorsports	1	0	0	0	0	20	13th
2024	Intercontinental GT Challenge	Lionspeed x Herberth	1	0	0	0	0	20	13th
2024	GT World Challenge Asia	Absolute Racing	12	2	0	?	4	131	**2nd**
2024	FIA GT World Cup	Absolute Racing	1	0	0	0	0	N/A	4th
2024	Nürburgring Langstrecken-Serie - SP9	Falken Motorsports	5	1	0	0	1	0	NC†
2024	24 Hours of Nürburgring - SP9	Falken Motorsports	1	0	0	0	0	N/A	6th
2024	GT World Challenge Europe Endurance Cup	Lionspeed x Herberth	1	0	0	0	0	0	NC
2024	International GT Open	Lionspeed GP x Herberth	1	0	0	1	0	0	68th
2024–25	Asian Le Mans Series - GT	Proton Competition	6	0	0	0	0	10	18th
2025	IMSA SportsCar Championship - GTD Pro	AO Racing	2	1	0	0	1	636	22nd
2025	European Le Mans Series - LMGT3	Proton Competition	4	0	0	0	1	29	12th
2025	GT World Challenge Asia	Origine Motorsport	4	1	0	0	2	43	16th
2025	Intercontinental GT Challenge	Absolute Racing	1	0	0	0	0	55	5th
2025	Intercontinental GT Challenge	Falken Motorsports	1	0	0	0	0	55	5th
2025	Intercontinental GT Challenge	Rutronik Racing	1	1	0	0	1	55	5th
2025	Intercontinental GT Challenge	Origine Motorsport	1	0	0	0	0	55	5th
2025	Intercontinental GT Challenge	RS1	1	0	0	0	0	55	5th
2025	Nürburgring Langstrecken-Serie - SP9	Falken Motorsports	3	1	0	0	2	0	NC
2025	24 Hours of Nürburgring - SP9	Falken Motorsports	1	0	0	0	0	N/A	DNF
2025	GT World Challenge Europe Endurance Cup	Rutronik Racing	5	0	0	0	3	73	**1st**
2025	FIA GT World Cup	Tempo by Absolute Racing	1	0	0	0	0	N/A	DNF
2026	IMSA SportsCar Championship - GTD Pro	AO Racing	3	0	0	1	2	926	15th
2026	Nürburgring Langstrecken-Serie - SP9	Dunlop Motorsports							
2026	24 Hours of Nürburgring - SP9	Dunlop Motorsports	1	0	0	0	0	N/A	DNF
2026	GT World Challenge Asia	Origine Motorsport	4	1	0	2	1	44	15th
2026	GT World Challenge Asia	Absolute Racing	2	0	0	0	0	44	15th
2026	GT World Challenge Europe Endurance Cup	Boutsen VDS	5	0	1	0	1	35	6th
2026	GT World Challenge Europe Sprint Cup	Boutsen VDS	2	0	0	0	0	1	29th
2026	European Le Mans Series - LMGT3	Proton Competition	1	0	0	0	1	18	19th
2026	GT World Challenge America - Pro	McCann Racing	1	0	0	0	0	0	NC†
2026	Intercontinental GT Challenge	Absolute Racing	1	0	0	0	0	42	8th
2026	Intercontinental GT Challenge	Dunlop Motorsports	1	0	0	0	0	42	8th
2026	Intercontinental GT Challenge	Boutsen VDS	1	0	0	0	0	42	8th
2026	Intercontinental GT Challenge	AO by Absolute Racing	1	1	0	0	1	42	8th
2026	Intercontinental GT Challenge	McCann Racing	1	0	0	0	0	42	8th
2026	FIA GT World Cup	Tempo by Absolute Racing	1	0	0	0	1	N/A	**3rd**

‡ Team standings

=== Complete Formula Renault 2.0 NEC results ===
(key) (Races in bold indicate pole position) (Races in italics indicate fastest lap)

Year	Entrant	1	2	3	4	5	6	7	8	9	10	11	12	13	14	15	16	17	18	19	20	DC	Points
2010	SL Formula Racing	HOC; 1	HOC; 2	BRN; 1	BRN; 2	ZAN; 1	ZAN; 2	OSC; 1	OSC; 2	OSC; 3	ASS; 1	ASS; 2	MST; 1; 8	MST; 2; 11	MST; 3; 12	SPA; 1; 7	SPA; 2; 15	SPA; 3; 7	NÜR; 1	NÜR; 2	NÜR; 3	8th	142
2011	SL Formula Racing	HOC; 1 Ret	HOC; 2; 8	HOC; 3 Ret	SPA; 1; 9	SPA; 2; 36	NÜR; 1; 5	NÜR; 2; 7	ASS; 1; 3	ASS; 2; 4	ASS; 3; 3	OSC; 1; 4	OSC; 2 Ret	ZAN; 1; 9	ZAN; 2; 11	MST; 1; 21	MST; 2; 4	MST; 3; 10	MNZ; 1; 4	MNZ; 2 Ret	MNZ; 3; 15	6th	209
2012	SL Formula Racing	HOC; 1	HOC; 2	HOC; 3	NÜR; 1	NÜR; 2	OSC; 1; 6	OSC; 2; 3	**OSC**; **3**; 19	ASS; 1; 16	ASS; 2; 28	RBR; 1	RBR; 2	MST; 1; 4	MST; 2; 27	MST; 3; 2	ZAN; 1	ZAN; 2	ZAN; 3	SPA; 1; 2	SPA; 2; 8	15th	120

=== Complete Eurocup Formula Renault 2.0 results ===
(key) (Races in bold indicate pole position; races in italics indicate fastest lap)

Year	Entrant	1	2	3	4	5	6	7	8	9	10	11	12	13	14	DC	Points
2011	SL Formula Racing	ALC; 1	ALC; 2	SPA; 1; 9	SPA; 2; 36	NÜR; 1	NÜR; 2	HUN; 1	HUN; 2	SIL; 1	SIL; 2	LEC; 1	LEC; 2	CAT; 1	CAT; 2	NC†	0

† As Picariello was a guest driver, he was ineligible for points

=== Complete ADAC Formel Masters results ===
(key) (Races in bold indicate pole position) (Races in italics indicate fastest lap)

Year	Team	1	2	3	4	5	6	7	8	9	10	11	12	13	14	15	16	17	18	19	20	21	22	23	24	DC	Points
2012	G&J/Schiler Motorsport	OSC; 1; 10	OSC; 2; 2	OSC; 3; 4	ZAN; 1; 12	ZAN; 2; 5	ZAN; 3; 7	SAC; 1 Ret	SAC; 2; 8	SAC; 3 C	NÜR1; 1; 1	NÜR1; 2; 3	NÜR1; 3 DSQ	RBR; 1; 3	**RBR**; **2**; 1	RBR; 3; 5	LAU; 1 Ret	LAU; 2; 9	LAU; 3; 4	NÜR2; 1; 7	NÜR2; 2; 12	NÜR2; 3; 13	HOC; 1; 10	HOC; 2; 7	HOC; 3; 14	6th	152
2013	ADAC Berlin-Brandenburg e.V.	**OSC**; **1**; 1	**OSC**; **2**; 1	OSC; 3; 4	SPA; 1; 1	SPA; 2; 1	SPA; 3 Ret	**SAC**; **1**; 6	**SAC**; **2**; 1	SAC; 3; 7	NÜR; 1; 1	NÜR; 2; 1	NÜR; 3; 3	RBR; 1; 1	RBR; 2; 1	RBR; 3 Ret	LAU; 1; 2	LAU; 2; 2	LAU; 3; 13	**SVK**; **1**; 1	SVK; 2; 2	SVK; 3; 16	HOC; 1; 1	HOC; 2; 1	HOC; 3; 4	1st	388

=== Complete Asian Le Mans Series results ===
(key) (Races in bold indicate pole position) (Races in italics indicate fastest lap)

Year	Team	Class	Car	Engine	1	2	3	4	5	6	Pos.	Points
2015–16	Absolute Racing	GT	Audi R8 LMS Ultra	Audi 5.2 L V10	FUJ	SEP1; 7					5th	50
2015–16	Absolute Racing	GT	Audi R8 LMS	Audi 5.2 L V10			BUR; 2	SEP2; 1			5th	50
2016–17	Absolute Racing	GT	Audi R8 LMS	Audi 5.2 L V10	ZHU; 5	FUJ	BUR	SEP			14th	10
2024–25	Proton Competition	GT	Porsche 911 GT3 R (992)	Porsche M97/80 4.2 L Flat-6	SEP; 1; 7	SEP; 2; 17	DUB; 2; 8	DUB; 2; 15	ABU; 1; 20	ABU; 2; 22	18th	10

=== Complete GT World Challenge Europe results ===
==== GT World Challenge Europe Sprint Cup ====
(key) (Races in bold indicate pole position; results in italics indicate fastest lap)

Year	Team	Car	Class	1	2	3	4	5	6	7	8	9	10	Pos.	Points
2016	Phoenix Racing	Audi R8 LMS	Silver	MIS; QR	MIS; CR	BRH; QR	BRH; CR	NÜR; QR	NÜR; CR	**HUN**; **QR**; 9	HUN; CR; Ret	**CAT**; **QR**; 7	CAT; CR; 6	7th	43
2018	Belgian Audi Club Team WRT	Audi R8 LMS	Silver	**ZOL**; **1**; 7	**ZOL**; **2**; 6	BRH; 1	BRH; 2	MIS; 1	MIS; 2	HUN; 1	HUN; 2	NÜR; 1	NÜR; 2	8th	35
2026	Boutsen VDS	Porsche 911 GT3 R (992.2)	Pro	BRH; 1	BRH; 2	MIS; 1	MIS; 2	MAG; 1; 9	MAG; 2; 12	ZAN; 1	ZAN; 2	CAT; 1	CAT; 2	29th	1

==== GT World Challenge Europe Endurance Cup ====
(key) (Races in bold indicate pole position; results in italics indicate fastest lap)

Year	Team	Car	Class	1	2	3	4	5	6	7	Pos.	Points
2022	Herberth Motorsport	Porsche 911 GT3 R	Pro-Am	IMO	LEC; 27	SPA; 6H; 27	SPA; 12H; 20	SPA; 24H; 43†			6th	49
2022	Dinamic Motorsport	Porsche 911 GT3 R	Pro						HOC; 3	CAT; 1	8th	40
2024	Lionspeed x Herberth	Porsche 911 GT3 R (992)	Bronze	LEC	SPA; 6H; 41	SPA; 12H; 28	SPA; 24H; 22	NÜR	MNZ	JED	29th	10
2025	Rutronik Racing	Porsche 911 GT3 R (992)	Pro	LEC; 2	MNZ; 21	SPA; 6H; 4	SPA; 12H; 6	SPA; 24H; 2	NÜR; 3	CAT; 7	1st	73
2026	Boutsen VDS	Porsche 911 GT3 R (992.2)	Pro	LEC; 11	MNZ; 4	SPA; 6H; 7	SPA; 12H; 15	SPA; 24H; 8	NÜR; 12	**ALG**; 3	6th	35

^{*} Season still in progress.

=== Complete ADAC GT Masters results ===
(key) (Races in bold indicate pole position; results in italics indicate fastest lap)

Year	Team	Car	1	2	3	4	5	6	7	8	9	10	11	12	13	14	DC	Points
2017	BWT Mücke Motorsport	Audi R8 LMS	OSC; 1	OSC; 2	LAU; 1	LAU; 2	RBR; 1	RBR; 2	ZAN; 1	ZAN; 2	NÜR; 1	NÜR; 2	SAC; 1; 5	SAC; 2; 15	HOC; 1	HOC; 2	34th	10
2018	Montaplast by Land-Motorsport	Audi R8 LMS	OSC; 1; 18	OSC; 2; 11	MST; 1 Ret	MST; 2; 6	RBR; 1; 20	RBR; 2; 11	NÜR; 1	NÜR; 2	ZAN; 1	ZAN; 2	SAC; 1	SAC; 2	HOC; 1	HOC; 2	34th	8

=== Complete GT World Challenge Asia results ===
(key) (Races in bold indicate pole position) (Races in italics indicate fastest lap)

Year	Team	Car	1	2	3	4	5	6	7	8	9	10	11	12	DC	Points
2017	J-Fly by Absolute Racing	Audi R8 LMS	SEP; 1	SEP; 2	CHA; 1; 4	**CHA**; **2**; 5	SUZ; 1; 13	**SUZ**; **2**; 3	FUJ; 1; 12	FUJ; 2 Ret	SHA; 1; 25	**SHA**; **2**; 11	ZHE; 1; 7	ZHE; 2; 10	12th	46
2018	Absolute Racing	Audi R8 LMS	SEP; 1	SEP; 2	CHA; 1	CHA; 2	SUZ; 1	SUZ; 2	FUJ; 1	FUJ; 2	SHA; 1; 2	SHA; 2 Ret	NIN; 1 Ret	NIN; 2; 2	18th	36
2019	Craft-Bamboo Racing	Mercedes-AMG GT3	SEP; 1; 1	SEP; 2; 20	CHA; 1; 13	**CHA**; **2**; 15	SUZ; 1; 16	**SUZ**; **2**; 1	FUJ; 1; 16	**FUJ**; **2**; 16	KOR; 1	KOR; 2	SHA; 1; 14	SHA; 2; 2	11th	68
2023	AAS Motorsport by Absolute Racing	Porsche 911 GT3 R (992)	BUR; 1; 2	**BUR**; **2**; 3	FUJ; 1; 2	FUJ; 2; 23	SUZ; 1	SUZ; 2	MOT; 1 Ret	MOT; 2; 6	**OKA**; **1**; 2	**OKA**; **2**; 2	SEP; 1	SEP; 2	6th	95
2024	Absolute Racing	Porsche 911 GT3 R (992)	SEP; 1; 5	SEP; 2; 12	BUR; 1; 4	BUR; 2; 3	FUJ; 1; 5	FUJ; 2; 1	SUZ; 1; 8	SUZ; 2; 2	OKA; 1; 8	OKA; 2; 17	SHA; 1; 1	SHA; 2; 6	2nd	131
2025	Origine Motorsport	Porsche 911 GT3 R (992)	SEP; 1	SEP; 2	MAN; 1; 23	MAN; 2; 1	BUR; 1	BUR; 2	FUJ; 1; 2	FUJ; 2; 9	OKA; 1	OKA; 2	BEI; 1	BEI; 2	16th	43
2026	Origine Motorsport	Porsche 911 GT3 R (992.2)	SEP; 1; 6	SEP; 2; 1	MAN; 1; 10	MAN; 2; 9	FUJ; 1	FUJ; 2	OKA; 1	OKA; 2	BEI; 1	BEI; 2			15th	44
2026	Absolute Racing	Porsche 911 GT3 R (992.2)											SHA; 1; 13	SHA; 2; 6	15th	44

=== Complete IMSA SportsCar Championship results ===
(key) (Races in bold indicate pole position; results in italics indicate fastest lap)

Year	Team	Class	Make	Engine	1	2	3	4	5	6	7	8	9	10	11	Pos.	Points
2018	Montaplast by Land-Motorsport	GTD	Audi R8 LMS GT3	Audi 5.2 L V10	DAY	SEB; 4	MOH	DET	WGL	MOS	LIM	ELK	VIR	LGA	PET	50th	28
2022	WeatherTech Racing	GTD Pro	Porsche 911 GT3 R	Porsche 4.0 L Flat-6	DAY; 8	SEB; 6	LBH	LGA	WGL	MOS	LIM	ELK	VIR	PET		21st	524
2024	Proton Competition	GTP	Porsche 963	Porsche 4.6 L V8	DAY; 5	SEB; 8	LBH	LGA	DET	WGL	ELK	IMS; 7	PET; 6			14th	1067
2025	AO Racing	GTD Pro	Porsche 911 GT3 R (992)	Porsche 4.2 L Flat-6	DAY; 8	SEB; 1	LGA	DET	WGL	MOS	ELK	VIR	IMS	PET		22nd	636
2026	AO Racing	GTD Pro	Porsche 911 GT3 R (992.2)	Porsche 4.2 L Flat-6	DAY; 9	SEB; 2	LGA	DET	WGL	MOS	ELK	VIR	IMS	PET; 2		15th	926

=== Complete FIA World Endurance Championship results ===
(key) (Races in bold indicate pole position; races in italics indicate fastest lap)

Year	Entrant	Class	Chassis	Engine	1	2	3	4	5	6	7	8	Rank	Points
2019–20	Gulf Racing	LMGTE Am	Porsche 911 RSR	Porsche 4.0 L Flat-6	SIL	FUJ	SHA	BHR	COA	SPA	LMS	BHR; 5	24th	15
2021	Dempsey-Proton Racing	LMGTE Am	Porsche 911 RSR-19	Porsche 4.2 L Flat-6	SPA; 5	PRT	MNZ; 6	LMS	BHR	BHR			17th	18
2023	Iron Lynx	LMGTE Am	Porsche 911 RSR-19	Porsche 4.2 L Flat-6	SEB; 6	PRT; 12	SPA; 11	LMS; Ret	MNZ; 2	FUJ; 11	BHR; Ret		15th	30

=== Complete European Le Mans Series results ===
(key) (Races in bold indicate pole position; results in italics indicate fastest lap)

Year	Entrant	Class	Chassis	Engine	1	2	3	4	5	6	Rank	Points
2020	Proton Competition	LMGTE	Porsche 911 RSR	Porsche 4.0 L Flat-6	LEC; 1	SPA; 6	**LEC**; 2	MNZ; 2	ALG; 1		1st	99
2022	Absolute Racing	LMGTE	Porsche 911 RSR-19	Porsche 4.2 L Flat-6	LEC; 8	IMO; Ret	MNZ; 4	CAT; 5	SPA; 3	ALG; 6	7th	49
2023	Proton Competition	LMGTE	Porsche 911 RSR-19	Porsche 4.2 L Flat-6	CAT; 1	LEC; 9	ARA; 2	**SPA**; 3	PRT; 2	ALG; 1	1st	105
2025	Proton Competition	LMGT3	Porsche 911 GT3 R (992)	Porsche 4.2 L Flat-6	CAT; 3	LEC; 8	IMO; 5	SPA; Ret	SIL	ALG	12th	29
2026	Proton Competition	LMGT3	Porsche 911 GT3 R (992.2)	Porsche 4.2 L Flat-6	CAT	LEC	IMO	SPA; 2	SIL	ALG	19th	18

^{*} Season still in progress.

=== Complete 24 Hours of Le Mans results ===
Year	Team	Co-Drivers	Car	Class	Laps	Pos.	Class Pos.
2021	(Germany) Absolute Racing	(Indonesia) Andrew Haryanto (Germany) Marco Seefried	Porsche 911 RSR-19	GTE; Am	332	34th	7th
2022	(United States) Hardpoint Motorsport	(Indonesia) Andrew Haryanto (Estonia) Martin Rump	Porsche 911 RSR-19	GTE; Am	338	44th	11th
2023	(Italy) Iron Lynx	(Italy) Matteo Cressoni (Italy) Claudio Schiavoni	Porsche 911 RSR-19	GTE; Am	28	DNF	DNF

=== Complete 24 Hours of Spa results ===
Year	Team	Co-Drivers	Car	Class	Laps	Pos.	Class Pos.
2022	(Switzerland) Porsche Zentrum Oberer Zürichsee by Herberth	(Germany) Stefan Aust (Switzerland) Nicolas Leutwiler (Germany) Nico Menzel	Porsche 911 GT3 R	Pro-Am	382	43rd	5th
2024	(Germany) Lionspeed x Herberth	(Hong Kong) Antares Au (Switzerland) Alexander Fach (Estonia) Martin Rump	Porsche 911 GT3 R (992)	Bronze	475	22nd	7th
2025	(Germany) Rutronik Racing	(Germany) Sven Müller (Switzerland) Patric Niederhauser	Porsche 911 GT3 R (992)	Pro	549	2nd	2nd
2026	(Belgium) Boutsen VDS	(France) Dorian Boccolacci (Netherlands) Morris Schuring	Porsche 911 GT3 R (992.2)	Pro	541	8th	8th

=== Complete Bathurst 12 Hour results ===
Year	Team	Co-drivers	Car	Class	Laps	Ovr. Pos.	Cla. Pos.
2024	(Germany) Manthey Racing / (Australia) EMA Motorsport	(United Kingdom) Harry King (Australia) Yasser Shahin	Porsche 911 GT3 R (992)	Pro-Am	274	9th	**1st**
2025	(China) Absolute Racing	(Australia) Matt Campbell (Turkey) Ayhancan Güven	Porsche 911 GT3 R (992)	Pro	306	6th	6th
2026	(China) Absolute Racing	(Denmark) Bastian Buus (Australia) Matt Campbell	Porsche 911 GT3 R (992)	Pro	262	6th	4th

=== Complete 24 Hours of Nürburgring results ===
Year	Team	Co-Drivers	Car	Class	Laps	Pos.	Class Pos.
2021	(Germany) Falken Motorsports	(Austria) Klaus Bachler (Germany) Sven Müller (Austria) Martin Ragginger	Porsche 911 GT3 R	SP9	59	4th	4th
2022	(Germany) Falken Motorsports	(Austria) Klaus Bachler (France) Patrick Pilet (Austria) Martin Ragginger	Porsche 911 GT3 R	SP9 Pro	58	DNF	DNF
2023	(Germany) Falken Motorsports	(Austria) Klaus Bachler (Germany) Sven Müller	Porsche 911 GT3 R (992)	SP9 Pro	77	DNF	DNF
2024	(Germany) Falken Motorsports	(France) Julien Andlauer (Austria) Klaus Bachler (Germany) Sven Müller	Porsche 911 GT3 R (992)	SP9 Pro	50	6th	6th
2025	(Germany) Falken Motorsports	(France) Julien Andlauer (Germany) Nico Menzel (Germany) Sven Müller	Porsche 911 GT3 R (992)	SP9 Pro	23	DNF	DNF
2026	(Germany) Dunlop Motorsport	(France) Julien Andlauer (France) Dorian Boccolacci (Germany) Nico Menzel	Porsche 911 GT3 R (992.2)	SP9 Pro	62	DNF	DNF

Sporting positions
Preceded by Marvin Kirchhöfer	ADAC Formel Masters; Champion; 2013	Succeeded by Mikkel Jensen
