= 2025 GT World Challenge Asia =

Motor racing competition season

The 2025 GT World Challenge Asia Powered by AWS was the sixth season of the GT World Challenge Asia, an auto racing series for grand tourer cars in Asia, co-promoted by the SRO Motorsports Group and Team Asia One GT Management. The races are contested with GT3-spec cars. The season began on April at the Sepang International Circuit in Malaysia and finished on October in the new Beijing Street Circuit in Taihu, Beijing, China. The series visited Mandalika Circuit in Indonesia, where it had been planned to compete in 2022 before the race was cancelled.

== Calendar ==
Round	Circuit	Date	Location
1	(Malaysia) Sepang International Circuit, Sepang District, Selangor	12–13 April	2025 GT World Challenge Asia is located in Asia
2	(Indonesia) Mandalika International Street Circuit, Central Lombok, West Nusa Tenggara	10–11 May	2025 GT World Challenge Asia is located in Asia
3	Chang International Circuit, Buriram, Thailand	31 May–1 June	2025 GT World Challenge Asia is located in Asia
4	(Japan) Fuji Speedway, Oyama, Shizuoka	12–13 July	2025 GT World Challenge Asia is located in Asia
5	(Japan) Okayama International Circuit, Mimasaka, Okayama	30–31 August	2025 GT World Challenge Asia is located in Asia
6	Beijing Street Circuit, Beijing, China	18–19 October	2025 GT World Challenge Asia is located in Asia

== Entry list ==
Team	Car	Engine	No.	Drivers	Class	Rounds
(China) Climax Racing	Mercedes-AMG GT3 Evo	Mercedes-AMG M159 6.2 L V8	2	(Estonia) Ralf Aron	PA	1–4
(China) Climax Racing	Mercedes-AMG GT3 Evo	Mercedes-AMG M159 6.2 L V8	2	(China) Mike Zhou Bihuang	PA	1–4
(China) Climax Racing	Mercedes-AMG GT3 Evo	Mercedes-AMG M159 6.2 L V8	44	(China) Ling Kang	SA	1–2
(China) Climax Racing	Mercedes-AMG GT3 Evo	Mercedes-AMG M159 6.2 L V8	44	(China) Zhang Yaqi	SA	1–2
(China) Origine Motorsport	Porsche 911 GT3 R (992)	Porsche M97/80 4.2 L Flat-6	4	(China) Lu Wei	PA	All
(China) Origine Motorsport	Porsche 911 GT3 R (992)	Porsche M97/80 4.2 L Flat-6	4	(Denmark) Bastian Buus	PA	1, 3, 5–6
(China) Origine Motorsport	Porsche 911 GT3 R (992)	Porsche M97/80 4.2 L Flat-6	4	(Belgium) Alessio Picariello	PA	2, 4
(China) Origine Motorsport	Porsche 911 GT3 R (992)	Porsche M97/80 4.2 L Flat-6	86	(Denmark) Anders Fjordbach	SA	All
(China) Origine Motorsport	Porsche 911 GT3 R (992)	Porsche M97/80 4.2 L Flat-6	86	(China) Li Kerong (Note: Chinese driver Li Kerong competed under the American license for the second round.)	SA	All
(China) Origine Motorsport	Porsche 911 GT3 R (992)	Porsche M97/80 4.2 L Flat-6	87	(China) Leo Ye Hongli	PA	All
(China) Origine Motorsport	Porsche 911 GT3 R (992)	Porsche M97/80 4.2 L Flat-6	87	(China) Yuan Bo	PA	All
(Japan) Plus with BMW M Team Studie	BMW M4 GT3 Evo	BMW P58 3.0 L Twin Turbo I6	5	(Japan) Seiji Ara	PA	1–5
(Japan) Plus with BMW M Team Studie	BMW M4 GT3 Evo	BMW P58 3.0 L Twin Turbo I6	5	(Japan) Tomohide Yamaguchi	PA	1–5
(New Zealand) EBM	Mercedes-AMG GT3 Evo	Mercedes-AMG M159 6.2 L V8	8	(Indonesia) Setiawan Santoso	Am	All
(New Zealand) EBM	Mercedes-AMG GT3 Evo	Mercedes-AMG M159 6.2 L V8	8	(Singapore) Martin Berry (Note: Australian driver Martin Berry competed under the Singaporean license for the Third round onwards.)	Am	1, 3, 5
(New Zealand) EBM	Mercedes-AMG GT3 Evo	Mercedes-AMG M159 6.2 L V8	8	(United Kingdom) Andrew Bentley	Am	2, 4
(New Zealand) EBM	Mercedes-AMG GT3 Evo	Mercedes-AMG M159 6.2 L V8	8	(Australia) Liam Talbot	Am	6
(New Zealand) EBM	Porsche 911 GT3 R (992)	Porsche M97/80 4.2 L Flat-6	61	(Malaysia) Adrian D'Silva	PA	1–2
(New Zealand) EBM	Porsche 911 GT3 R (992)	Porsche M97/80 4.2 L Flat-6	61	(Luxembourg) Dylan Pereira	PA	1
(New Zealand) EBM	Porsche 911 GT3 R (992)	Porsche M97/80 4.2 L Flat-6	61	(New Zealand) Chris van der Drift	PA	2
(Japan) GTO Racing Team	Porsche 911 GT3 R (992)	Porsche M97/80 4.2 L Flat-6	10	(Chinese Taipei) Brian Lee	PA	All
(Japan) GTO Racing Team	Porsche 911 GT3 R (992)	Porsche M97/80 4.2 L Flat-6	10	(Germany) Nico Menzel	PA	All
(China) Phantom Global Racing	Porsche 911 GT3 R (992)	Porsche M97/80 4.2 L Flat-6	13	(Hong Kong) Adderly Fong	SA	All
(China) Phantom Global Racing	Porsche 911 GT3 R (992)	Porsche M97/80 4.2 L Flat-6	13	(China) Chris Chia On	SA	1–3
(China) Phantom Global Racing	Porsche 911 GT3 R (992)	Porsche M97/80 4.2 L Flat-6	13	(China) "JZ"	SA	4–5
(China) Phantom Global Racing	Porsche 911 GT3 R (992)	Porsche M97/80 4.2 L Flat-6	13	(China) Li Chao	SA	6
(China) Phantom Global Racing	Porsche 911 GT3 R (992)	Porsche M97/80 4.2 L Flat-6	37	(France) Dorian Boccolacci	PA	All
(China) Phantom Global Racing	Porsche 911 GT3 R (992)	Porsche M97/80 4.2 L Flat-6	37	(China) Anthony Liu Xu	PA	All
(China) Uno Racing Team	Audi R8 LMS Evo II	Audi DAR 5.2 L V10	16	(Hong Kong) "Rio"	S	All
(China) Uno Racing Team	Audi R8 LMS Evo II	Audi DAR 5.2 L V10	16	(Hong Kong) Shaun Thong Wei Fung	S	All
(Japan) Porsche Center Okazaki	Porsche 911 GT3 R (992)	Porsche M97/80 4.2 L Flat-6	18	(Japan) Hiroaki Nagai	PA	2, 4–5
(Japan) Porsche Center Okazaki	Porsche 911 GT3 R (992)	Porsche M97/80 4.2 L Flat-6	18	(Japan) Kazuto Kotaka	PA	2, 4
(Japan) Porsche Center Okazaki	Porsche 911 GT3 R (992)	Porsche M97/80 4.2 L Flat-6	18	(Japan) Naoya Gamou	PA	5
(Japan) Porsche Center Okazaki	Porsche 911 GT3 R (992)	Porsche M97/80 4.2 L Flat-6	25	(Japan) Kiyoshi Uchiyama	SA	1–5
(Japan) Porsche Center Okazaki	Porsche 911 GT3 R (992)	Porsche M97/80 4.2 L Flat-6	25	(Japan) Yuta Kamimura	SA	1
(Japan) Porsche Center Okazaki	Porsche 911 GT3 R (992)	Porsche M97/80 4.2 L Flat-6	25	(Japan) Tsubasa Kondo	SA	2–5
(Hong Kong) Absolute Corse	Lamborghini Huracán GT3 Evo 2	Lamborghini DGF 5.2 L V10	19	(Italy) Loris Spinelli	PA	1, 3–4 (Note: Absolute Corse No. 19 was entered into the first round, but withdrew ahead of the round due to logistical issues.)
(Hong Kong) Absolute Corse	Lamborghini Huracán GT3 Evo 2	Lamborghini DGF 5.2 L V10	19	(Switzerland) Edoardo Mortara	PA	2, 5
(Hong Kong) Absolute Corse	Lamborghini Huracán GT3 Evo 2	Lamborghini DGF 5.2 L V10	19	(Indonesia) "Andrea Anatra"	PA	2
(Hong Kong) Absolute Corse	Lamborghini Huracán GT3 Evo 2	Lamborghini DGF 5.2 L V10	19	(Thailand) Henk Kiks (Note: Dutch driver Henk Kiks competed under the Thai license.)	PA	3
(Hong Kong) Absolute Corse	Lamborghini Huracán GT3 Evo 2	Lamborghini DGF 5.2 L V10	19	(Philippines) "Vincenzo Ricci"	PA	4–5
(Hong Kong) Absolute Corse	Lamborghini Huracán GT3 Evo 2	Lamborghini DGF 5.2 L V10	29	(China) Huang Ruohan	SA	All
(Hong Kong) Absolute Corse	Lamborghini Huracán GT3 Evo 2	Lamborghini DGF 5.2 L V10	29	(Malaysia) Akash Neil Nandy	SA	All
(Hong Kong) Absolute Corse	Ferrari 296 GT3	Ferrari F163CE 3.0 L Turbo V6	98	(Indonesia) Anderson Tanoto	PA	1–2
(Hong Kong) Absolute Corse	Ferrari 296 GT3	Ferrari F163CE 3.0 L Turbo V6	98	(France) Jean-Baptiste Simmenauer	PA	1
(Hong Kong) Absolute Corse	Ferrari 296 GT3	Ferrari F163CE 3.0 L Turbo V6	98	(Netherlands) Thierry Vermeulen	PA	2, 4
(Hong Kong) Absolute Corse	Ferrari 296 GT3	Ferrari F163CE 3.0 L Turbo V6	98	(Japan) Hiroshi Hamaguchi	PA	4
(Macau) Elegant Racing Team	Mercedes-AMG GT3 Evo	Mercedes-AMG M159 6.2 L V8	30	(Macau) Liu Lic Ka	Am	1–3, 5–6
(Macau) Elegant Racing Team	Mercedes-AMG GT3 Evo	Mercedes-AMG M159 6.2 L V8	30	(Germany) Reinhold Renger	Am	1–3, 5–6
(Hong Kong) Craft-Bamboo Racing	Mercedes-AMG GT3 Evo	Mercedes-AMG M159 6.2 L V8	31	(China) Cao Qi	PA	All
(Hong Kong) Craft-Bamboo Racing	Mercedes-AMG GT3 Evo	Mercedes-AMG M159 6.2 L V8	31	(Australia) Jayden Ojeda	PA	1–2, 4–6
(Hong Kong) Craft-Bamboo Racing	Mercedes-AMG GT3 Evo	Mercedes-AMG M159 6.2 L V8	31	(Canada) Daniel Morad	PA	3
(Hong Kong) Craft-Bamboo Racing	Mercedes-AMG GT3 Evo	Mercedes-AMG M159 6.2 L V8	77	(China) Liang Jiatong	S	All
(Hong Kong) Craft-Bamboo Racing	Mercedes-AMG GT3 Evo	Mercedes-AMG M159 6.2 L V8	77	(Singapore) Danial Frost	S	1–3, 5
(Hong Kong) Craft-Bamboo Racing	Mercedes-AMG GT3 Evo	Mercedes-AMG M159 6.2 L V8	77	(Hong Kong) Darryl O'Young	S	4, 6
(South Korea) Vollgas Motorsports	Porsche 911 GT3 R (992)	Porsche M97/80 4.2 L Flat-6	33	(South Korea) Han Min-Kwan	SA	1–5
(South Korea) Vollgas Motorsports	Porsche 911 GT3 R (992)	Porsche M97/80 4.2 L Flat-6	33	(South Korea) Lee Chan-joon	SA	1 (Note: Lee Chan-Joon was entered into the first round, but withdrew ahead of the round. He was replaced by Dominic Ang)
(South Korea) Vollgas Motorsports	Porsche 911 GT3 R (992)	Porsche M97/80 4.2 L Flat-6	33	(Malaysia) Dominic Ang	SA	1
(South Korea) Vollgas Motorsports	Porsche 911 GT3 R (992)	Porsche M97/80 4.2 L Flat-6	33	(Netherlands) "Daan Arrow"	SA	2–5
(China) FAW Audi Sport Asia Team Phantom	Audi R8 LMS Evo II	Audi DAR 5.2 L V10	45	(China) Franky Cheng Congfu	S	All
(China) FAW Audi Sport Asia Team Phantom	Audi R8 LMS Evo II	Audi DAR 5.2 L V10	45	(China) James Yu Kuai	S	All
(China) Audi Sport Asia Team Phantom	Audi R8 LMS Evo II	Audi DAR 5.2 L V10	46	(Germany) Markus Winkelhock	PA	1–5
(China) Audi Sport Asia Team Phantom	Audi R8 LMS Evo II	Audi DAR 5.2 L V10	46	(China) Bao Jinlong	PA	1–3, 6
(China) Audi Sport Asia Team Phantom	Audi R8 LMS Evo II	Audi DAR 5.2 L V10	46	(China) Bian Ye	PA	4–5
(China) Audi Sport Asia Team Phantom	Audi R8 LMS Evo II	Audi DAR 5.2 L V10	46	(Sweden) Joel Eriksson	PA	6
(Australia) AMAC Motorsport	Porsche 911 GT3 R (991.2)	Porsche M97/80 4.0 L Flat-6	51	(Australia) William Ben Porter	Am	All (Note: Andrew Macpherson was entered into the first round, but withdrew ahead of the round. William Ben Porter entered the race by himself.)
(Australia) AMAC Motorsport	Porsche 911 GT3 R (991.2)	Porsche M97/80 4.0 L Flat-6	51	(Australia) Andrew Macpherson	Am	All
(China) Winhere Harmony Racing	Ferrari 296 GT3	Ferrari F163CE 3.0 L Turbo V6	55	(China) Liu Hangcheng	SA	1–4
(China) Winhere Harmony Racing	Ferrari 296 GT3	Ferrari F163CE 3.0 L Turbo V6	55	(Italy) Lorenzo Patrese	SA	1–2
(China) Winhere Harmony Racing	Ferrari 296 GT3	Ferrari F163CE 3.0 L Turbo V6	55	(Finland) Elias Seppänen	SA	3–4
(China) Winhere Harmony Racing	Ferrari 296 GT3	Ferrari F163CE 3.0 L Turbo V6	55	(China) Ye Yifei	PA	5–6
(China) Winhere Harmony Racing	Ferrari 296 GT3	Ferrari F163CE 3.0 L Turbo V6	55	(China) Song Jiajun	PA	5
(China) Winhere Harmony Racing	Ferrari 296 GT3	Ferrari F163CE 3.0 L Turbo V6	55	(China) Zhang Yaqi	PA	6
(China) Winhere Harmony Racing	Ferrari 296 GT3	Ferrari F163CE 3.0 L Turbo V6	96	(China) Deng Yi	S	All
(China) Winhere Harmony Racing	Ferrari 296 GT3	Ferrari F163CE 3.0 L Turbo V6	96	(China) Chen Weian	S	1–2
(China) Winhere Harmony Racing	Ferrari 296 GT3	Ferrari F163CE 3.0 L Turbo V6	96	(China) Luo Kailuo	S	3–6
(Japan) LM corsa	Ferrari 296 GT3	Ferrari F163CE 3.0 L Turbo V6	60	(Japan) Kei Nakanishi	Am	1, 4–5
(Japan) LM corsa	Ferrari 296 GT3	Ferrari F163CE 3.0 L Turbo V6	60	(Japan) Shigekazu Wakisaka	Am	1, 4–5
(Japan) LM corsa	Ferrari 296 GT3	Ferrari F163CE 3.0 L Turbo V6	60	(Japan) Shigekazu Wakisaka	PA	2–3
(Japan) LM corsa	Ferrari 296 GT3	Ferrari F163CE 3.0 L Turbo V6	60	(Italy) Giancarlo Fisichella	PA	2–3
(Malaysia) Johor Motorsports Racing JMR	Chevrolet Corvette Z06 GT3.R	Chevrolet LT6.R 5.5 L V8	66	(Malaysia) Prince Abu Bakar Ibrahim	PA	All
(Malaysia) Johor Motorsports Racing JMR	Chevrolet Corvette Z06 GT3.R	Chevrolet LT6.R 5.5 L V8	66	(Australia) Jordan Love	PA	1–4
(Malaysia) Johor Motorsports Racing JMR	Chevrolet Corvette Z06 GT3.R	Chevrolet LT6.R 5.5 L V8	66	(United Kingdom) Alexander Sims	PA	5–6
(Malaysia) Johor Motorsports Racing JMR	Chevrolet Corvette Z06 GT3.R	Chevrolet LT6.R 5.5 L V8	99	(United Kingdom) Alexander Sims	PA	1
(Malaysia) Johor Motorsports Racing JMR	Chevrolet Corvette Z06 GT3.R	Chevrolet LT6.R 5.5 L V8	99	(Malaysia) Prince Jefri Ibrahim	PA	All
(Malaysia) Johor Motorsports Racing JMR	Chevrolet Corvette Z06 GT3.R	Chevrolet LT6.R 5.5 L V8	99	(United Kingdom) Ben Green	PA	2–6
(Indonesia) Garage 75	Ferrari 296 GT3	Ferrari F163CE 3.0 L Turbo V6	75	(Italy) Christian Colombo	Am	All
(Indonesia) Garage 75	Ferrari 296 GT3	Ferrari F163CE 3.0 L Turbo V6	75	(Indonesia) David Tjiptobiantoro	Am	All
(China) Team KRC	BMW M4 GT3 Evo	BMW P58 3.0 L Twin Turbo I6	89	(Netherlands) Maxime Oosten	SA	All
(China) Team KRC	BMW M4 GT3 Evo	BMW P58 3.0 L Twin Turbo I6	89	(China) Ruan Cunfan	SA	All
(Hong Kong) Absolute Racing	Porsche 911 GT3 R (992)	Porsche M97/80 4.2 L Flat-6	321	(China) Li Xuanyu	SA	1–3
(Hong Kong) Absolute Racing	Porsche 911 GT3 R (992)	Porsche M97/80 4.2 L Flat-6	321	(South Korea) Lee Chang-Woo	SA	4
(Hong Kong) Absolute Racing	Porsche 911 GT3 R (992)	Porsche M97/80 4.2 L Flat-6	321	(China) Xu Zhefeng	SA	5
(Hong Kong) Absolute Racing	Porsche 911 GT3 R (992)	Porsche M97/80 4.2 L Flat-6	321	(China) Daniel Lu Wenlong	SA	1–5
(Hong Kong) Absolute Racing	Porsche 911 GT3 R (992)	Porsche M97/80 4.2 L Flat-6	321	(China) Daniel Lu Wenlong	S	6
(Hong Kong) Absolute Racing	Porsche 911 GT3 R (992)	Porsche M97/80 4.2 L Flat-6	321	(Malaysia) Nazim Azman	S	6
(Hong Kong) Absolute Racing	Porsche 911 GT3 R (992)	Porsche M97/80 4.2 L Flat-6	911	(China) Wang Zhongwei	PA	All
(Hong Kong) Absolute Racing	Porsche 911 GT3 R (992)	Porsche M97/80 4.2 L Flat-6	911	(France) Patrick Pilet	PA	1, 3–6
(Hong Kong) Absolute Racing	Porsche 911 GT3 R (992)	Porsche M97/80 4.2 L Flat-6	911	(United Kingdom) Harry King	PA	2
(Japan) Team 5ZIGEN	Nissan GT-R Nismo GT3	Nissan VR38DETT 3.8 L Twin Turbo V6	500	(Japan) Yu Kanamaru	SA	All
(Japan) Team 5ZIGEN	Nissan GT-R Nismo GT3	Nissan VR38DETT 3.8 L Twin Turbo V6	500	(Japan) "Motoki"	SA	1–2
(Japan) Team 5ZIGEN	Nissan GT-R Nismo GT3	Nissan VR38DETT 3.8 L Twin Turbo V6	500	(Japan) "Hirobon"	SA	3–6

Icon	Class
Drivers
S	Silver Cup
PA	Pro-Am Cup
SA	Silver-Am Cup
Am	Am Cup

== Race results ==
Bold indicates overall winner of the race.

Round		Circuit	Pole position	Pro/Am winners	Silver winners	Silver-Am winners	Am winners
1	R1	(Malaysia) Sepang	(China) No. 45 FAW Audi Sport Asia Team Phantom	**(China) No. 87 Origine Motorsport**	(China) No. 45 FAW Audi Sport Asia Team Phantom	(China) No. 89 Team KRC	(Australia) No. 51 AMAC Motorsport
1	R1	(Malaysia) Sepang	(China) Franky Cheng Congfu (China) James Yu Kuai	**(China) Leo Ye Hongli** **(China) Yuan Bo**	(China) Franky Cheng Congfu (China) James Yu Kuai	(Netherlands) Maxime Oosten (China) Ruan Cunfan	(Australia) William Ben Porter
1	R2	(Malaysia) Sepang	(China) No. 2 Climax Racing	**(Malaysia) No. 99 Johor Motorsports Racing JMR**	(China) No. 45 FAW Audi Sport Asia Team Phantom	(China) No. 89 Team KRC	(Indonesia) No. 75 Garage 75
1	R2	(Malaysia) Sepang	(Estonia) Ralf Aron (China) Mike Zhou Bihuang	**(Malaysia) Prince Jefri Ibrahim** **(United Kingdom) Alexander Sims**	(China) Frankie Cheng Congfu (China) James Yu Kuai	(Netherlands) Maxime Oosten (China) Ruan Cunfan	(Italy) Christian Colombo (Indonesia) David Tjiptobiantoro
2	R3	(Indonesia) Mandalika	(China) No. 45 FAW Audi Sport Asia Team Phantom	**(China) No. 87 Origine Motorsport**	(China) No. 96 Winhere Harmony Racing	(China) No. 89 Team KRC	(Macau) No. 30 Elegant Racing Team
2	R3	(Indonesia) Mandalika	(China) Franky Cheng Congfu (China) James Yu Kuai	**(China) Leo Ye Hongli** **(China) Yuan Bo**	(China) Chen Weian (China) Deng Yi	(Netherlands) Maxime Oosten (China) Ruan Cunfan	(Macau) Liu Lic Ka (Germany) Reinhold Renger
2	R4	(Indonesia) Mandalika	(Hong Kong) No. 31 Craft-Bamboo Racing	**(China) No. 4 Origine Motorsport**	(Hong Kong) No. 77 Craft-Bamboo Racing	(China) No. 89 Team KRC	(New Zealand) No. 8 EBM
2	R4	(Indonesia) Mandalika	(China) Cao Qi (Australia) Jayden Ojeda	**(China) Lu Wei** **(Belgium) Alessio Picariello**	(Singapore) Danial Frost (China) Liang Jiatong	(Netherlands) Maxime Oosten (China) Ruan Cunfan	(United Kingdom) Andrew Bentley (Indonesia) Setiawan Santoso
3	R5	(Thailand) Buriram	(China) No. 96 Winhere Harmony Racing	(China) No. 4 Origine Motorsport	**(China) No. 45 FAW Audi Sport Asia Team Phantom**	(Japan) No. 500 Team 5ZIGEN	(New Zealand) No. 8 EBM
3	R5	(Thailand) Buriram	(China) Deng Yi (China) Luo Kailuo	(Denmark) Bastian Buus (China) Lu Wei	**(China) Franky Cheng Congfu** **(China) James Yu Kuai**	(Japan) "Hirobon" (Japan) Yu Kanamaru	(Singapore) Martin Berry (Indonesia) Setiawan Santoso
3	R6	(Thailand) Buriram	(Malaysia) No. 99 Johor Motorsports Racing JMR	**(Malaysia) No. 99 Johor Motorsports Racing JMR**	(China) No. 16 Uno Racing Team	(China) No. 89 Team KRC	(Indonesia) No. 75 Garage 75
3	R6	(Thailand) Buriram	(United Kingdom) Ben Green (Malaysia) Prince Jefri Ibrahim	**(United Kingdom) Ben Green** **(Malaysia) Prince Jefri Ibrahim**	(Hong Kong) "Rio" (Hong Kong) Shaun Thong Wei Fung	(Netherlands) Maxime Oosten (China) Ruan Cunfan	(Italy) Christian Colombo (Indonesia) David Tjiptobiantoro
4	R7	(Japan); Fuji	(China) No. 96 Winhere Harmony Racing	**(China) No. 87 Origine Motorsport**	(China) No. 45 FAW Audi Sport Asia Team Phantom	(Japan) No. 500 Team 5ZIGEN	(New Zealand) No. 8 EBM
4	R7	(Japan); Fuji	(China) Deng Yi (China) Luo Kailuo	**(China) Leo Ye Hongli** **(China) Yuan Bo**	(China) Franky Cheng Congfu (China) James Yu Kuai	(Japan) "Hirobon" (Japan) Yu Kanamaru	(United Kingdom) Andrew Bentley (Indonesia) Setiawan Santoso
4	R8	(Japan); Fuji	(Malaysia) No. 99 Johor Motorsports Racing JMR	**(Malaysia) No. 99 Johor Motorsports Racing JMR**	(China) No. 96 Winhere Harmony Racing	(China) No. 86 Origine Motorsport	(Indonesia) No. 75 Garage 75
4	R8	(Japan); Fuji	(United Kingdom) Ben Green (Malaysia) Prince Jefri Ibrahim	**(United Kingdom) Ben Green** **(Malaysia) Prince Jefri Ibrahim**	(China) Deng Yi (China) Luo Kailuo	(Denmark) Anders Fjordbach (China) Li Kerong	(Italy) Christian Colombo (Indonesia) David Tjiptobiantoro
5	R9	(Japan) Okayama	(China) No. 96 Winhere Harmony Racing	(China) No. 37 Phantom Global Racing	**(China) No. 96 Winhere Harmony Racing**	(Japan) No. 500 Team 5ZIGEN	(China) No. 60 LM corsa
5	R9	(Japan) Okayama	(China) Deng Yi (China) Luo Kailuo	(France) Dorian Boccolacci (China) Anthony Liu Xu	**(China) Deng Yi** **(China) Luo Kailuo**	(Japan) "Hirobon" (Japan) Yu Kanamaru	(Japan) Kei Nakanishi (Japan) Shigekazu Wakisaka
5	R10	(Japan) Okayama	(China) No. 4 Origine Motorsport	**(China) No. 4 Origine Motorsport**	(China) No. 16 Uno Racing Team	(Japan) No. 500 Team 5ZIGEN	(Indonesia) No. 75 Garage 75
5	R10	(Japan) Okayama	(Denmark) Bastian Buus (China) Lu Wei	**(Denmark) Bastian Buus** **(China) Lu Wei**	(Hong Kong) "Rio" (Hong Kong) Shaun Thong Wei Fung	(Japan) "Hirobon" (Japan) Yu Kanamaru	(Italy) Christian Colombo (Indonesia) David Tjiptobiantoro
6	R11	(China) Beijing	(China) No. 96 Winhere Harmony Racing	(Japan) No. 10 GTO Racing Team	(Hong Kong) No. 77 Craft-Bamboo Racing	**(Japan) No. 500 Team 5ZIGEN**	(New Zealand) No. 8 EBM
6	R11	(China) Beijing	(China) Deng Yi (China) Luo Kailuo	(Chinese Taipei) Brian Lee (Germany) Nico Menzel	(China) Liang Jiatong (Hong Kong) Darryl O'Young	**(Japan) "Hirobon"** **(Japan) Yu Kanamaru**	(Indonesia) Setiawan Santoso (Australia) Liam Talbot
6	R12	(China) Beijing	(Hong Kong) No. 31 Craft-Bamboo Racing	**(China) No. 55 Winhere Harmony Racing**	(Hong Kong) No. 77 Craft-Bamboo Racing	(Hong Kong) No. 29 Absolute Racing	(Australia) No. 51 AMAC Motorsport
6	R12	(China) Beijing	(China) Cao Qi (Australia) Jayden Ojeda	**(China) Ye Yifei** **(China) Zhang Yaqi**	(China) Liang Jiatong (Hong Kong) Darryl O'Young	(China) Huang Ruohan (Malaysia) Akash Neil Nandy	(Australia) Andrew Macpherson (Australia) William Ben Porter

== Championship standings ==
Scoring system

Championship points are awarded for the first ten positions in each race. Entries are required to complete 75% of the winning car's race distance in order to be classified and earn points. Individual drivers are required to participate for a minimum of 25 minutes in order to earn championship points in any race.

Position	**1st**	**2nd**	**3rd**	**4th**	**5th**	**6th**	**7th**	**8th**	**9th**	**10th**
Points	25	18	15	12	10	8	6	4	2	1

=== Drivers' championships ===
==== Overall ====
Pos.	Driver	Team	SEP (Malaysia)		MAN (Indonesia)		BUR (Thailand)		FUJ (Japan)		OKA (Japan)		BEI (China)		Points
1	(China) Leo Ye Hongli (China) Yuan Bo	(China) Origine Motorsport	1	5	1	6	Ret	19	1	2	6	Ret	14	7	125
2	(China) Lu Wei	(China) Origine Motorsport	Ret	10	23	1	3	7	2	19	3	**1**	6	4	125
3	(Malaysia) Prince Jefri Ibrahim	(Malaysia) Johor Motorsports Racing JMR	4	1	11	10	4	**1**	8	**1**	17	Ret	12	2	122
4	(France) Dorian Boccolacci (China) Anthony Liu Xu	(China) Phantom Global Racing	2	6	3	2	11	5	29	11	2	4	Ret	21†	99
5	(Netherlands) Maxime Oosten (China) Ruan Cunfan	(China) Team KRC	3	4	5	4	9	2	11	23	12	8	3	8	92
6	(United Kingdom) Ben Green	(Malaysia) Johor Motorsports Racing JMR			11	10	4	**1**	8	**1**	17	Ret	12	2	85
7	(Denmark) Bastian Buus	(China) Origine Motorsport	Ret	10			3	7			3	**1**	6	4	82
8	(China) Franky Cheng Congfu (China) James Yu Kuai	(China) FAW Audi Sport Asia Team Phantom	**5**	3	**7**	24	1	10	4	Ret	5	10	16	13	80
9	(United Kingdom) Alexander Sims	(Malaysia) Johor Motorsports Racing JMR	4	1							22	2	4	5	77
10	(China) Cao Qi	(Hong Kong) Craft-Bamboo Racing	19	2	9	**9**	7	4	10	3	7	5	20	**Ret**	72
11	(Japan) Yu Kanamaru	(Japan) Team 5ZIGEN	23	17	22	16	6	6	6	12	4	7	1	12	67
11	(Japan) "Hirobon"	(Japan) Team 5ZIGEN					6	6	6	12	4	7	1	12	67
12	(China) Deng Yi	(China) Winhere Harmony Racing	6	26	4	22	**2**	Ret	**23**	9	**1**	17	**Ret**	DNS	65
13	(Malaysia) Prince Abu Bakar Ibrahim	(Malaysia) Johor Motorsports Racing JMR	28	Ret	8	8	17	Ret	3	22	22	2	4	5	63
14	(Australia) Jayden Ojeda	(Hong Kong) Craft-Bamboo Racing	19	2	9	**9**			10	3	7	5	20	**Ret**	54
15	(China) Luo Kailuo	(China) Winhere Harmony Racing					**2**	Ret	**23**	9	**1**	17	**Ret**	DNS	45
16	(Belgium) Alessio Picariello	(China) Origine Motorsport			23	1			2	19					43
17	(China) Wang Zhongwei	(Hong Kong) Absolute Racing	15	18	28	15	18	Ret	5	26†	19	3	5	17	35
17	(France) Patrick Pilet	(Hong Kong) Absolute Racing	15	18			18	Ret	5	26†	19	3	5	17	35
18	(Estonia) Ralf Aron (China) Mike Zhou Bihuang	(China) Climax Racing	Ret	**22**	2	25	Ret	3	18	20					33
19	(China) Bao Jinlong	(China) Audi Sport Asia Team Phantom	20	7	31	Ret	5	13					15	3	31
20	(China) Liang Jiatong	(Hong Kong) Craft-Bamboo Racing	29	Ret	6	3	19	16	22	10	14	12	7	10	31
21	(China) Huang Ruohan (Malaysia) Akash Neil Nandy	(Hong Kong) Absolute Corse	7	9	18	12	24	8	9	6	21	11	21	6	30
22	(Chinese Taipei) Brian Lee (Germany) Nico Menzel	(Japan) GTO Racing Team	8	29	19	Ret	14	20	21	7	Ret	14	2	14	28
23	(China) Zhang Yaqi	(China) Climax Racing	12	27	Ret	DNS									25
23	(China) Zhang Yaqi	(China) Winhere Harmony Racing											11	1	25
23	(China) Ye Yifei	(China) Winhere Harmony Racing									28	26	11	1	25
24	(Germany) Markus Winkelhock	(China) Audi Sport Asia Team Phantom	20	7	31	Ret	5	13	14	17	13	6			24
25	(Singapore) Danial Frost	(Hong Kong) Craft-Bamboo Racing	29	Ret	6	3	19	16			14	12			23
26	(Australia) Jordan Love	(Malaysia) Johor Motorsports Racing JMR	28	Ret	8	8	17	Ret	3	22					23
27	(China) Chen Weian	(China) Winhere Harmony Racing	6	26	4	22									20
28	(Canada) Daniel Morad	(Hong Kong) Craft-Bamboo Racing					7	4							18
29	(Italy) Loris Spinelli	(Hong Kong) Absolute Corse	WD	WD			8	18	24	4					16
30	(Hong Kong) "Rio" (Hong Kong) Shaun Thong Wei Fung	(China) Uno Racing Team	Ret	8	17	11	Ret	9	12	27†	8	9	8	11	16
31	(Sweden) Joel Eriksson	(China) Audi Sport Asia Team Phantom											15	3	15
32	(Philippines) "Vincenzo Ricci"	(Hong Kong) Absolute Corse							24	4	15	DNS			12
33	(Denmark) Anders Fjordbach (China) Li Kerong	(China) Origine Motorsport	14	19	12	Ret	20	12	16	5	10	19	Ret	DNS	11
34	(Netherlands) Thierry Vermeulen	(Hong Kong) Absolute Corse			10	18			7	8					11
35	(Switzerland) Edoardo Mortara	(Hong Kong) Absolute Corse			13	5					15	DNS			10
35	(Indonesia) "Andrea Anatra"	(Hong Kong) Absolute Corse			13	5									10
36	(Japan) Hiroshi Hamaguchi	(Hong Kong) Absolute Corse							7	8					10
37	(China) Bian Ye	(China) Audi Sport Asia Team Phantom							14	17	13	6			8
38	(Hong Kong) Darryl O'Young	(Hong Kong) Craft-Bamboo Racing							22	10			7	10	8
39	(Japan) Shigekazu Wakisaka	(Japan) LM corsa	27	25	20	7	23	26	27	25†	23	23			6
39	(Italy) Giancarlo Fisichella	(Japan) LM corsa			20	7	23	26							6
40	(Thailand) Henk Kiks	(Hong Kong) Absolute Corse					8	18							4
41	(Hong Kong) Adderly Fong	(China) Phantom Global Racing	22	28	14	27	22	17	20	29†	18	22	17	9	2
42	(Indonesia) Setiawan Santoso	(New Zealand) EBM	25	21	Ret	17	15	Ret	25	18	25	21	9	16	2
43	(Australia) William Ben Porter	(Australia) AMAC Motorsport	9	23	29	19	21	22	28	16	26	25	18	15	2
44	(Japan) Hiroaki Nagai	(Japan) Porsche Center Okazaki			27	23			19	Ret	9	16			2
44	(Japan) Naoya Gamou	(Japan) Porsche Center Okazaki									9	16			2
45	(Australia) Liam Talbot	(New Zealand) EBM											9	16	2
46	(China) Li Chao	(China) Phantom Global Racing											17	9	2
47	(Japan) Kiyoshi Uchiyama	(Japan) Porsche Center Okazaki	13	11	15	21	10	14	13	15	24	15			1
47	(Japan) Tsubasa Kondo	(Japan) Porsche Center Okazaki			15	21	10	14	13	15	24	15			1
48	(China) Daniel Lu Wenlong	(Hong Kong) Absolute Racing	10	15	31	14	26	24	Ret	21	20	13	19	20	1
48	(China) Li Xuanyu	(Hong Kong) Absolute Racing	10	15	31	14	26	24							1
49	(Indonesia) Anderson Tanoto	(Hong Kong) Absolute Corse	18	Ret	10	18									1
50	(Macau) Liu Lic Ka (Germany) Reinhold Renger	(Macau) Elegant Racing Team	26	24	24	28	25	25			Ret	24	10	19	1
—	(South Korea) Han Ming-Wan	(South Korea) Vollgas Motorsports	21	14	21	13	12	11	15	13	11	Ret			0
—	(Netherlands) "Daan Arrow"	(South Korea) Vollgas Motorsports			21	13	12	11	15	13	11	Ret			0
—	(China) Liu Hangcheng	(China) Winhere Harmony Racing	11	20	Ret	29	13	23	Ret	28†					0
—	(Japan) Yuta Kamimura	(Japan) Porsche Center Okazaki	13	11											0
—	(Italy) Lorenzo Patrese	(China) Winhere Harmony Racing	11	20	Ret	29									0
—	(Japan) Seiji Ara (Japan) Tomohide Yamaguchi	(Japan) Plus with BMW M Team Studie	16	12	26	26	27	15	17	24	16	18			0
—	(China) Ling Kang	(China) Climax Racing	12	27	Ret	DNS									0
—	(Italy) Christian Colombo (Indonesia) David Tjiptobiantoro	(Indonesia) Garage 75	24	16	25	20	16	21	26	14	27	20	13	18	0
—	(Malaysia) Adrian D'Silva	(New Zealand) EBM	17	13	16	Ret									0
—	(Luxembourg) Dylan Pereira	(New Zealand) EBM	17	13											0
—	(China) Xu Zhefeng	(Hong Kong) Absolute Racing									20	13			0
—	(Finland) Elias Seppänen	(China) Winhere Harmony Racing					13	23	Ret	28†					0
—	(China) Chris Chia On	(China) Phantom Global Racing	22	28	14	27	22	17							0
—	(Malaysia) Dominic Ang	(South Korea) Vollgas Motorsports	21	14											0
—	(Australia) Andrew Macpherson	(Australia) AMAC Motorsport	WD	WD	29	19	21	22	28	16	26	25	18	15	0
—	(Australia) Martin Berry	(New Zealand) EBM	25	21			15	Ret			25	21			0
—	(United Kingdom) Harry King	(Hong Kong) Absolute Racing			28	15									0
—	(Japan) "Motoki"	(Japan) Team 5ZIGEN	23	17	22	16									0
—	(New Zealand) Chris van der Drift	(New Zealand) EBM			16	Ret									0
—	(United Kingdom) Andrew Bentley	(New Zealand) EBM			Ret	17			25	18					0
—	(China) "JZ"	(China) Phantom Global Racing							20	29†	18	22			0
—	(France) Jean-Baptiste Simmenauer	(Hong Kong) Absolute Corse	18	Ret											0
—	(Malaysia) Nazim Azman	(Hong Kong) Absolute Racing											19	20	0
—	(Japan) Kazuto Kotaka	(Japan) Porsche Center Okazaki			27	23			19	Ret					0
—	(South Korea) Lee Chang-Won	(Hong Kong) Absolute Corse							Ret	21					0
—	(Japan) Kei Nakanishi	(Japan) LM corsa	27	25					27	25†	23	23			0
—	(China) Song Jiajun	(China) Winhere Harmony Racing									28	26			0
—	(South Korea) Lee Chan-joon	(South Korea) Vollgas Motorsports	WD	WD											0
Pos.	Driver	Team	SEP (Malaysia)		MAN (Indonesia)		BUR (Thailand)		FUJ (Japan)		OKA (Japan)		BEI (China)		Points

Colour	Result
Gold	Winner
Silver	Second place
Bronze	Third place
Green	Points classification
Blue	Non-points classification
Blue	Non-classified finish (NC)
Purple	Retired, not classified (Ret)
Red	Did not qualify (DNQ)
Red	Did not pre-qualify (DNPQ)
Black	Disqualified (DSQ)
White	Did not start (DNS)
White	Withdrew (WD)
White	Race cancelled (C)
Blank	Did not practice (DNP)
Blank	Did not arrive (DNA)
Blank	Excluded (EX)

**Bold** – Pole

Italics – Fastest Lap

Notes:

- † – Drivers did not finish the race, but were classified as they completed more than 90% of the race distance.

==== Pro-Am Cup ====
Pos.	Driver	Team	SEP (Malaysia)		MAN (Indonesia)		BUR (Thailand)		FUJ (Japan)		OKA (Japan)		BEI (China)		Points
1	(China) Lu Wei	(China) Origine Motorsport	Ret	6	12	1	1	5	2	9	2	**1**	4	4	155
2	(Malaysia) Prince Jefri Ibrahim	(Malaysia) Johor Motorsports Racing JMR	3	1	7	8	2	**1**	6	**1**	9	Ret	6	2	154
3	(China) Leo Ye Hongli (China) Yuan Bo	(China) Origine Motorsport	**1**	3	1	4	Ret	9	**1**	2	3	Ret	7	6	151
4	(France) Dorian Boccolacci (China) Anthony Liu Xu	(China) Phantom Global Racing	2	4	**3**	2	**6**	4	14	7	**1**	4	Ret	9	128
5	(United Kingdom) Ben Green	(Malaysia) Johor Motorsports Racing JMR			7	8	2	**1**	6	**1**	9	Ret	6	2	114
6	(Denmark) Bastian Buus	(China) Origine Motorsport	Ret	6			1	5			2	**1**	4	4	110
7	(China) Cao Qi	(Hong Kong) Craft-Bamboo Racing	9	2	5	**7**	4	3	7	3	4	5	9	**Ret**	106
8	(United Kingdom) Alexander Sims	(Malaysia) Johor Motorsports Racing JMR	3	1							11	2	2	5	86
9	(Malaysia) Prince Abu Bakar Ibrahim	(Malaysia) Johor Motorsports Racing JMR	11	Ret	4	6	8	Ret	3	11	11	2	2	5	85
10	(Australia) Jayden Ojeda	(Hong Kong) Craft-Bamboo Racing	9	2	5	**7**			7	3	4	5	9	**Ret**	81
11	(Chinese Taipei) Brian Lee (Germany) Nico Menzel	(Japan) GTO Racing Team	4	11	10	Ret	7	10	12	5	Ret	7	1	7	67
12	(China) Wang Zhongwei	(Hong Kong) Absolute Racing	5	9	15	9	9	Ret	4	13†	10	3	3	8	63
13	(France) Patrick Pilet	(Hong Kong) Absolute Racing	5	9			9	Ret	4	13†	10	3	3	8	61
14	(Germany) Markus Winkelhock	(China) Audi Sport Asia Team Phantom	10	5	15	Ret	3	6	8	8	6	6			58
15	(China) Bao Jinlong	(China) Audi Sport Asia Team Phantom	10	5	15	Ret	3	6					8	3	53
16	(Belgium) Alessio Picariello	(China) Origine Motorsport			12	1			2	9					45
17	(Estonia) Ralf Aron (China) Mike Zhou Bihuang	(China) Climax Racing	Ret	**10**	2	12	Ret	2	10	10					39
18	(Australia) Jordan Love	(Malaysia) Johor Motorsports Racing JMR	11	Ret	4	6	8	Ret	3	11					39
19	(China) Ye Yifei	(China) Winhere Harmony Racing									12	10	**5**	1	36
20	(China) Zhang Yaqi	(China) Winhere Harmony Racing											**5**	1	35
21	(Japan) Seiji Ara (Japan) Tomohide Yamaguchi	(Japan) Plus with BMW M Team Studie	6	7	13	13	11	7	9	12	8	9			28
22	(Canada) Daniel Morad	(Hong Kong) Craft-Bamboo Racing					4	3							27
23	(Netherlands) Thierry Vermeulen	(Hong Kong) Absolute Corse			6	10			5	6					27
24	(Italy) Loris Spinelli	(Hong Kong) Absolute Corse	WD	WD			5	8	13	4					26
25	(Switzerland) Edoardo Mortara	(Hong Kong) Absolute Corse			8	3					7	DNS			25
26	(China) Bian Ye	(China) Audi Sport Asia Team Phantom							8	8	6	6			22
27	(Indonesia) "Andrea Anatra"	(Hong Kong) Absolute Corse			8	3									19
28	(Sweden) Joel Eriksson	(China) Audi Sport Asia Team Phantom											8	3	19
29	(Philippines) "Vincenzo Ricci"	(Hong Kong) Absolute Corse							13	4	7	DNS			18
30	(Japan) Hiroshi Hamaguchi	(Hong Kong) Absolute Corse							5	6					18
31	(Japan) Hiroaki Nagai	(Japan) Porsche Center Okazaki			14	11			11	Ret	5	8			14
32	(Thailand) Henk Kiks	(Hong Kong) Absolute Corse					5	8							14
33	(Japan) Naoya Gamou	(Japan) Porsche Center Okazaki									5	8			14
34	(Indonesia) Anderson Tanoto	(Hong Kong) Absolute Corse	8	Ret	6	10									13
35	(Malaysia) Adrian D'Silva	(New Zealand) EBM	7	8	9	Ret									12
36	(Italy) Giancarlo Fisichella (Japan) Shigekazu Wakisaka	(Japan) LM corsa			11	5	10	11							11
37	(Luxembourg) Dylan Pereira	(New Zealand) EBM	7	8											10
38	(France) Jean-Baptiste Simmenauer	(Hong Kong) Absolute Corse	8	Ret											4
39	(United Kingdom) Harry King	(Hong Kong) Absolute Racing			15	9									2
40	(New Zealand) Chris van der Drift	(New Zealand) EBM			9	Ret									2
41	(China) Song Jiajun	(China) Winhere Harmony Racing									12	10			1
—	(Japan) Kazuto Kotaka	(Japan) Porsche Center Okazaki			14	11			11	Ret					0
Pos.	Driver	Team	SEP (Malaysia)		MAN (Indonesia)		BUR (Thailand)		FUJ (Japan)		OKA (Japan)		BEI (China)		Points

==== Silver Cup ====
Pos.	Driver	Team	SEP (Malaysia)		MAN (Indonesia)		BUR (Thailand)		FUJ (Japan)		OKA (Japan)		BEI (China)		Points
1	(China) Franky Cheng Congfu (China) James Yu Kuai	(China) FAW Audi Sport Asia Team Phantom	**1**	**1**	**3**	4	1	**2**	1	**Ret**	2	**2**	3	3	211
2	(China) Liang Jiatong	(Hong Kong) Craft-Bamboo Racing	3	Ret	2	1	3	3	3	2	4	3	1	1	198
3	(Hong Kong) "Rio" (Hong Kong) Shaun Thong Wei Fung	(China) Uno Racing Team	Ret	2	4	2	Ret	1	2	3†	3	1	2	2	182
4	(China) Deng Yi	(China) Winhere Harmony Racing	2	3	1	**3**	**2**	Ret	**4**	1	**1**	4	**Ret**	**DNS**	165
5	(Singapore) Danial Frost	(Hong Kong) Craft-Bamboo Racing	3	Ret	2	1	3	3			4	3			115
6	(China) Luo Kailuo	(China) Winhere Harmony Racing					**2**	Ret	**4**	1	**1**	4	**Ret**	**DNS**	92
7	(Hong Kong) Darryl O'Young	(Hong Kong) Craft-Bamboo Racing							3	2			1	1	83
8	(China) Chen Weian	(China) Winhere Harmony Racing	2	3	1	**3**									73
9	(Malaysia) Nazim Azman (China) Daniel Lu Wenlong	(Hong Kong) Absolute Racing											4	4	24
Pos.	Driver	Team	SEP (Malaysia)		MAN (Indonesia)		BUR (Thailand)		FUJ (Japan)		OKA (Japan)		BEI (China)		Points

==== Silver-Am Cup ====
Pos.	Driver	Team	SEP (Malaysia)		MAN (Indonesia)		BUR (Thailand)		FUJ (Japan)		OKA (Japan)		BEI (China)		Points
1	(Netherlands) Maxime Oosten (China) Ruan Cunfan	(China) Team KRC	1	**1**	1	1	2	**1**	3	7	4	2	2	2	230
2	(Japan) Yu Kanamaru	(Japan) Team 5ZIGEN	10	6	7	5	**1**	2	1	3	**1**	1	1	4	213
3	(Japan) "Hirobon"	(Japan) Team 5ZIGEN					**1**	2	1	3	**1**	1	1	4	170
4	(China) Huang Ruohan (Malaysia) Akash Neil Nandy	(Hong Kong) Absolute Corse	**2**	2	**5**	2	8	3	**2**	2	7	3	**Ret**	1	165
5	(Denmark) Anders Fjordbach (China) Li Kerong	(China) Origine Motorsport	7	7	2	Ret	6	5	6	1	2	6	Ret	**DNS**	107
6	(Japan) Kiyoshi Uchiyama	(Japan) Porsche Center Okazaki	6	3	4	6	3	6	4	5	8	5			102
7	(South Korea) Han Ming-Wan	(South Korea) Vollgas Motorsports	8	4	6	3	4	4	5	**4**	3	**Ret**			100
8	(Hong Kong) Adderly Fong	(China) Phantom Global Racing	9	10	3	7	7	7	7	9†	5	7	3	3	90
9	(Netherlands) "Daan Arrow"	(South Korea) Vollgas Motorsports			6	3	4	4	5	**4**	3	**Ret**			84
10	(Japan) Tsubasa Kondo	(Japan) Porsche Center Okazaki			4	6	3	6	4	5	8	5			79
11	(China) Daniel Lu Wenlong	(Hong Kong) Absolute Racing	3	5	8	4	9	9	Ret	6	6	4			73
12	(China) Li Xuanyu	(Hong Kong) Absolute Racing	3	5	8	4	9	9							45
13	(China) Liu Hangcheng	(China) Winhere Harmony Racing	4	8	Ret	**8**	5	8	Ret	8†					38
14	(China) Chris Chia On	(China) Phantom Global Racing	9	10	3	7	7	7							36
15	(China) Li Chao	(China) Phantom Global Racing											3	3	30
16	(Japan) "Motoki"	(Japan) Team 5ZIGEN	10	6	7	5									25
17	(China) "JZ"	(China) Phantom Global Racing							7	9†	5	7			24
18	(Japan) Yuta Kamimura	(Japan) Porsche Center Okazaki	6	3											23
19	(China) Xu Zhefeng	(Hong Kong) Absolute Racing									6	4			20
20	(Italy) Lorenzo Patrese	(China) Winhere Harmony Racing	4	8	Ret	**8**									20
21	(Finland) Elias Seppänen	(China) Winhere Harmony Racing					5	8	Ret	8†					18
22	(Malaysia) Dominic Ang	(South Korea) Vollgas Motorsports	8	4											16
23	(China) Ling Kang (China) Zhang Yaqi	(China) Climax Racing	5	9	Ret	DNS									12
24	(South Korea) Lee Chang-Won	(Hong Kong) Absolute Corse							Ret	6					8
—	(South Korea) Lee Chan-Joon	(South Korea) Vollgas Motorsports	WD	WD											0
Pos.	Driver	Team	SEP (Malaysia)		MAN (Indonesia)		BUR (Thailand)		FUJ (Japan)		OKA (Japan)		BEI (China)		Points

==== Am Cup ====
Pos.	Driver	Team	SEP (Malaysia)		MAN (Indonesia)		BUR (Thailand)		FUJ (Japan)		OKA (Japan)		BEI (China)		Points
1	(Italy) Christian Colombo (Indonesia) David Tjiptobiantoro	(Indonesia) Garage 75	2	1	2	3	2	1	2	**1**	4	1	3	3	229
2	(Indonesia) Setiawan Santoso	(New Zealand) EBM	3	2	Ret	**1**	1	**Ret**	1	3	2	2	1	**2**	202
3	(Australia) William Ben Porter	(Australia) AMAC Motorsport	**1**	**3**	**3**	2	**3**	2	**4**	2	3	5	**4**	1	198
4	(Australia) Andrew Macpherson	(Australia) AMAC Motorsport	WD	WD	**3**	2	**3**	2	**4**	2	3	5	**4**	1	158
5	(Macau) Liu Lic Ka (Germany) Reinhold Renger	(Macau) Elegant Racing Team	4	4	1	4	4	3			Ret	4	2	4	130
6	(Australia) Martin Berry	(New Zealand) EBM	3	2			1	**Ret**			2	2			94
7	(Japan) Kei Nakanishi (Japan) Shigekazu Wakisaka	(Japan) LM corsa	5	5					3	4	**1**	**3**			87
8	(United Kingdom) Andrew Bentley	(New Zealand) EBM			Ret	**1**			1	3					65
9	(Australia) Liam Talbot	(New Zealand) EBM											1	**2**	43
Pos.	Driver	Team	SEP (Malaysia)		MAN (Indonesia)		BUR (Thailand)		FUJ (Japan)		OKA (Japan)		BEI (China)		Points

==== China Cup ====
Pos.	Driver	Team	SEP (Malaysia)		MAN (Indonesia)		BUR (Thailand)		FUJ (Japan)		OKA (Japan)		BEI (China)		Points
1	(China) Leo Ye Hongli (China) Yuan Bo	(China) Origine Motorsport	1	2	1	1	Ret	4	1	1	3	Ret	4	2	200
2	(China) Frankie Cheng Congfu (China) James Yu Kuai	(China) FAW Audi Sport Asia Team Phantom	2	1	3	5	1	2	2	Ret	2	2	5	6	183
3	(Hong Kong) "Rio" (Hong Kong) Shaun Thong Wei Fung	(China) Uno Racing Team	Ret	3	5	2	Ret	1	3	4†	4	1	2	5	160
4	(China) Deng Yi	(China) Winhere Harmony Racing	3	5	2	4	2	Ret	6	2	1	4	Ret	DNS	136
5	(Hong Kong) Adderly Fong	(China) Phantom Global Racing	6	7	4	6	3	3	4	5†	5	5	6	3	129
6	(China) Daniel Lu Wenlong	(Hong Kong) Absolute Racing	4	4	6	3	4	5			6	3			92
7	(China) Luo Kailuo	(China) Winhere Harmony Racing					2	Ret	6	2	1	4	Ret	DNS	81
8	(China) Li Xuanyu	(Hong Kong) Absolute Racing	4	4	6	3	4	5							69
9	(China) Chris Chia On	(China) Phantom Global Racing	6	7	4	6	3	3							64
10	(China) Liang Jiatong (Hong Kong) Darryl O'Young	(Hong Kong) Craft-Bamboo Racing							5	3			1	4	62
11	(China) Zhang Yaqi	(China) Climax Racing	5	6	Ret	DNS									61
11	(China) Zhang Yaqi	(China) Winhere Harmony Racing											3	1	61
12	(China) Chen Weian	(China) Winhere Harmony Racing	3	5	2	4									55
13	(China) Ye Yifei	(China) Winhere Harmony Racing									7	Ret	3	1	46
14	(China) "JZ"	(China) Phantom Global Racing							4	5†	5	5			42
15	(China) Ling Kang	(China) Climax Racing	5	6	Ret	DNS									18
16	(China) Xu Zhefeng	(Hong Kong) Absolute Racing									6	3			23
17	(China) Li Chao	(China) Phantom Global Racing											6	3	23
18	(China) Song Jiajun	(China) Winhere Harmony Racing									7	Ret			6
Pos.	Driver	Team	SEP (Malaysia)		MAN (Indonesia)		BUR (Thailand)		FUJ (Japan)		OKA (Japan)		BEI (China)		Points

=== Team championships ===
Pos.	Team	SEP (Malaysia)		MAN (Indonesia)		BUR (Thailand)		FUJ (Japan)		OKA (Japan)		BEI (China)		Points
1	(China) Origine Motorsport	1	5	1	1	3	7	1	2	3	1	6	4	260
1	(China) Origine Motorsport	14	10	23	6	20	12	2	5	6	19	14	7	260
2	(Malaysia) Johor Motorsports Racing JMR	4	1	8	8	4	1	3	1	17	2	4	2	185
2	(Malaysia) Johor Motorsports Racing JMR	28	Ret	11	10	17	Ret	8	22	22	Ret	12	5	185
3	(China) FAW Audi Sport Asia Team Phantom Audi Sport Asia Team Phantom	5	3	7	24	1	10	4	17	5	6	15	3	119
3	(China) FAW Audi Sport Asia Team Phantom Audi Sport Asia Team Phantom	22	7	31	Ret	5	13	14	Ret	13	10	16	13	119
4	(Hong Kong) Craft-Bamboo Racing	19	2	6	3	7	4	10	3	7	5	7	10	104
4	(Hong Kong) Craft-Bamboo Racing	29	Ret	9	9	19	16	22	10	14	12	20	Ret	104
5	(China) Phantom Global Racing	2	6	3	2	11	5	20	11	2	4	17	9	102
5	(China) Phantom Global Racing	22	28	14	27	22	17	29	Ret	18	22	Ret	21	102
6	(China) Winhere Harmony Racing	6	20	4	22	2	23	23	9	1	17	11	1	92
6	(China) Winhere Harmony Racing	11	26	Ret	29	13	Ret	Ret	28	28	26	Ret	DNS	92
7	(China) Team KRC	3	4	5	4	9	2	11	23	12	8	3	8	92
8	(Japan) Team 5ZIGEN	23	17	22	16	6	6	6	12	4	7	1	12	67
9	(Hong Kong) Absolute Corse	7	9	10	5	8	8	7	4	15	11	Ret	6	63
9	(Hong Kong) Absolute Corse	18	Ret	13	12	24	18	9	6	21	DNS			63
10	(Hong Kong) Absolute Racing	10	15	28	14	18	24	5	21	19	3	5	17	36
10	(Hong Kong) Absolute Racing	15	18	30	15	26	Ret	Ret	26	20	13	19	20	36
11	(China) Climax Racing	12	22	2	25	Ret	3	18	20					33
11	(China) Climax Racing	Ret	27	Ret	DNS									33
12	(Japan) GTO Racing Team	8	29	19	Ret	14	20	21	7	Ret	14	2	14	28
13	(China) Uno Racing Team	Ret	8	17	11	Ret	9	12	27	8	9	8	11	16
14	(Japan) LM corsa	27	25	20	7	23	26	27	25	23	23			6
15	(Japan) Porsche Center Okazaki	13	11	15	21	10	14	13	15	9	15			3
15	(Japan) Porsche Center Okazaki			27	23			19	Ret	24	16			3
16	(New Zealand) EBM	17	13	16	17	15	Ret	25	18	25	21	9	16	2
16	(New Zealand) EBM	25	21	Ret	Ret									2
17	(Australia) AMAC Motorsport	9	23	29	19	21	22	28	16	26	25	18	15	2
18	(Macau) Elegant Racing Team	26	24	24	28	25	25			Ret	24	10	19	1
19	(South Korea) Vollgas Motorsports	21	14	21	13	12	11	15	13	11	Ret			1
—	(Japan) Plus with BMW M Team Studie	16	12	26	26	27	15	17	24	16	18			0
—	(Indonesia) Garage 75	24	16	25	20	16	21	26	14	27	20	13	18	0
Pos.	Team	SEP (Malaysia)		MAN (Indonesia)		BUR (Thailand)		FUJ (Japan)		OKA (Japan)		BEI (China)		Points

== See also ==
- 2025 British GT Championship
- 2025 GT World Challenge Europe
- 2025 GT World Challenge Europe Endurance Cup
- 2025 GT World Challenge Europe Sprint Cup
- 2025 GT World Challenge America
- 2025 GT World Challenge Australia
- 2025 Intercontinental GT Challenge
