= Beijing E-Town Street Circuit =

Motorsport track in Beijing, China

Beijing Street Circuit
- Location: Beijing, China
- Coordinates: 39°46′53″N 116°34′18″E
- FIA Grade: 3R (Note: Beijing Street Circuit has a specific Grade 3 license for this layout, named as "Grade 3 Restricted".)
- Opened: 17 October 2025; 13 months ago
- Architect: Apex Circuit Design
- Major events: Current: GT World Challenge Asia (2025–present); SRO GT Cup (2025–present)

Street Circuit (2025–present)
- Length: 4.894 km (3.041 mi)
- Turns: 13
- Race lap record: 1:44.374 ( (China) Yifei Ye, Ferrari 296 GT3, 2025, GT3)

The Beijing Street Circuit or Beijing E-Town Street Circuit is 4.894 km (3.041 mi) anti-clockwise street circuit located in Beijing, China. The circuit was announced in October 2024 to host the finale of 2025 GT World Challenge Asia season, the circuit also hosted the third round of SRO GT Cup besides it. Before its opening, it was already announced that the circuit would also host the finale of GT World Challenge Asia season for 2026.

The circuit is designed by Apex Circuit Design and located around the Tongming Lake Park in the Beijing Economic-Technological Development Area.

== Lap records ==
As of October 2026, the fastest official race lap records at the Beijing E-Town Street Circuit are listed as:

Category	Time	Driver	Vehicle	Event
Street Circuit (2025–present): 4.894 km (3.041 mi)
GT3	1:44.374	Yifei Ye	Ferrari 296 GT3	2025 Beijing GT World Challenge Asia round
GT4	1:54.298	Moritz Berrenberg	Porsche 718 Cayman GT4 RS Clubsport	2026 Beijing SRO GT Cup round
