= 2025 TSS The Super Series =

Sports car racing series edition

The 2025 TSS The Super Series by B-Quik was the twelfth season of the TSS The Super Series, a South-East Asian sports car racing series organised by the TSS and with the partnership alongside SRO Motorsports Group. The season started on 23 May at Chang International Circuit and finished on 2 November, also at Chang International Circuit. The races were contested with GT3-spec, GT Cup-spec and GT4-spec cars.

== Calendar ==
Round	Circuit	Date	Supporting Series	Location
1	Chang International Circuit, Buriram, Thailand	24–25 May	Formula 4 South East Asia Championship; Thailand Super Series	2025 TSS The Super Series is located in Southeast Asia
2	Bangsaen Street Circuit, Chonburi, Thailand	5–6 July	Formula 4 South East Asia Championship; Porsche Carrera Cup Asia; Thailand Super Series	2025 TSS The Super Series is located in Southeast Asia
3	Sepang International Circuit, Sepang District, Malaysia	9–10 August	N/A	2025 TSS The Super Series is located in Southeast Asia
4	Sepang International Circuit, Sepang District, Malaysia	20–21 September	Formula 4 South East Asia Championship; GR86 Cup Malaysia Series; Thailand Super Series	2025 TSS The Super Series is located in Southeast Asia
5	Chang International Circuit, Buriram, Thailand	1–2 November	N/A	2025 TSS The Super Series is located in Southeast Asia

== Entry list ==
Team	Car	Engine	No.	Drivers	Class	Rounds
Supercar GT3
Singha Motorsport Team Thailand	Honda NSX GT3 Evo22	Honda JNC1 3.5 L Twin Turbo V6	12	(Thailand) Piti Bhirombhakdi	PA	All
Singha Motorsport Team Thailand	Honda NSX GT3 Evo22	Honda JNC1 3.5 L Twin Turbo V6	12	(Thailand) Kantasak Kusiri	PA	All
Singha Motorsport Team Thailand	Ferrari 296 GT3	Ferrari F163CE 3.0 L Turbo V6	89	(Thailand) Voravud Bhirombhakdi	PA	All
Singha Motorsport Team Thailand	Ferrari 296 GT3	Ferrari F163CE 3.0 L Turbo V6	89	(Netherlands) Carlo van Dam	PA	All
(New Zealand) AAS Motorsport by EBM	Porsche 911 GT3 R (992)	Porsche M97/80 4.2 L Flat-6	18	(Thailand) Vutthikorn Inthraphuvasak	PA	All
(New Zealand) AAS Motorsport by EBM	Porsche 911 GT3 R (992)	Porsche M97/80 4.2 L Flat-6	18	(Germany) Laurin Heinrich	PA	1–3, 5
(New Zealand) AAS Motorsport by EBM	Porsche 911 GT3 R (992)	Porsche M97/80 4.2 L Flat-6	18	(France) Dorian Boccolacci	PA	4
(Thailand) / Amerasian Fragrance by AF Racing (Note: Car No. 11 entered as Amerasian Fragrance by AF Racing, car No. 26 and No. 27 entered as B-Quik Absolute Racing, car No. 37 entered as Winhere By B-Quik Absolute Racing, and car No. No. 786 entered as Renazzo Motor with Absolute Racing); (Thailand) / B-Quik Absolute Racing; (Thailand) / Winhere By B-Quik Absolute Racing; (Thailand) / Renazzo Motor with Absolute Racing	Ferrari 296 GT3	Ferrari F163CE 3.0 L Turbo V6	11	(United States) Gregory Bennett	PA	1–2
(Thailand) / Amerasian Fragrance by AF Racing; (Thailand) / B-Quik Absolute Racing; (Thailand) / Winhere By B-Quik Absolute Racing; (Thailand) / Renazzo Motor with Absolute Racing	Ferrari 296 GT3	Ferrari F163CE 3.0 L Turbo V6	11	(Thailand) Carl Bennett	PA	1
(Thailand) / Amerasian Fragrance by AF Racing; (Thailand) / B-Quik Absolute Racing; (Thailand) / Winhere By B-Quik Absolute Racing; (Thailand) / Renazzo Motor with Absolute Racing	Ferrari 296 GT3	Ferrari F163CE 3.0 L Turbo V6	11	(New Zealand) Chris van der Drift	PA	2
(Thailand) / Amerasian Fragrance by AF Racing; (Thailand) / B-Quik Absolute Racing; (Thailand) / Winhere By B-Quik Absolute Racing; (Thailand) / Renazzo Motor with Absolute Racing	Porsche 911 GT3 R (992)	Porsche M97/80 4.2 L Flat-6	26	(Netherlands) Henk Kiks	PA	All
(Thailand) / Amerasian Fragrance by AF Racing; (Thailand) / B-Quik Absolute Racing; (Thailand) / Winhere By B-Quik Absolute Racing; (Thailand) / Renazzo Motor with Absolute Racing	Porsche 911 GT3 R (992)	Porsche M97/80 4.2 L Flat-6	26	(Thailand) Sandy Stuvik	PA	All
(Thailand) / Amerasian Fragrance by AF Racing; (Thailand) / B-Quik Absolute Racing; (Thailand) / Winhere By B-Quik Absolute Racing; (Thailand) / Renazzo Motor with Absolute Racing	Audi R8 LMS Evo II	Audi DAR 5.2 L V10	27	(Thailand) Sathaporn Veerachure	Am	1–2
(Thailand) / Amerasian Fragrance by AF Racing; (Thailand) / B-Quik Absolute Racing; (Thailand) / Winhere By B-Quik Absolute Racing; (Thailand) / Renazzo Motor with Absolute Racing	Audi R8 LMS Evo II	Audi DAR 5.2 L V10	27	(Thailand) Adisak Tangphuncharoen	Am	1–2
(Thailand) / Amerasian Fragrance by AF Racing; (Thailand) / B-Quik Absolute Racing; (Thailand) / Winhere By B-Quik Absolute Racing; (Thailand) / Renazzo Motor with Absolute Racing	Audi R8 LMS Evo II	Audi DAR 5.2 L V10	27	(Thailand) Adisak Tangphuncharoen	PA	3–4
(Thailand) / Amerasian Fragrance by AF Racing; (Thailand) / B-Quik Absolute Racing; (Thailand) / Winhere By B-Quik Absolute Racing; (Thailand) / Renazzo Motor with Absolute Racing	Audi R8 LMS Evo II	Audi DAR 5.2 L V10	27	(Malaysia) Akash Nandy	PA	3–4
(Thailand) / Amerasian Fragrance by AF Racing; (Thailand) / B-Quik Absolute Racing; (Thailand) / Winhere By B-Quik Absolute Racing; (Thailand) / Renazzo Motor with Absolute Racing	Audi R8 LMS Evo II	Audi DAR 5.2 L V10	37	(Malaysia) Akash Nandy	PA	2
(Thailand) / Amerasian Fragrance by AF Racing; (Thailand) / B-Quik Absolute Racing; (Thailand) / Winhere By B-Quik Absolute Racing; (Thailand) / Renazzo Motor with Absolute Racing	Audi R8 LMS Evo II	Audi DAR 5.2 L V10	37	(China) Deng Yi	PA	2
(Thailand) / Amerasian Fragrance by AF Racing; (Thailand) / B-Quik Absolute Racing; (Thailand) / Winhere By B-Quik Absolute Racing; (Thailand) / Renazzo Motor with Absolute Racing	Audi R8 LMS Evo II	Audi DAR 5.2 L V10	786	(Poland) Karol Basz	PA	1, 5
(Thailand) / Amerasian Fragrance by AF Racing; (Thailand) / B-Quik Absolute Racing; (Thailand) / Winhere By B-Quik Absolute Racing; (Thailand) / Renazzo Motor with Absolute Racing	Audi R8 LMS Evo II	Audi DAR 5.2 L V10	786	(Thailand) Sak Nana	PA	1, 5
(Thailand) / Amerasian Fragrance by AF Racing; (Thailand) / B-Quik Absolute Racing; (Thailand) / Winhere By B-Quik Absolute Racing; (Thailand) / Renazzo Motor with Absolute Racing	Audi R8 LMS Evo II	Audi DAR 5.2 L V10	786	(Thailand) Sak Nana	Am	2
(Thailand) / Amerasian Fragrance by AF Racing; (Thailand) / B-Quik Absolute Racing; (Thailand) / Winhere By B-Quik Absolute Racing; (Thailand) / Renazzo Motor with Absolute Racing	Audi R8 LMS Evo II	Audi DAR 5.2 L V10	786	(Germany) Dieter Schmidtmann	Am	2
(Thailand) / Amerasian Fragrance by AF Racing; (Thailand) / B-Quik Absolute Racing; (Thailand) / Winhere By B-Quik Absolute Racing; (Thailand) / Renazzo Motor with Absolute Racing	Audi R8 LMS Evo II	Audi DAR 5.2 L V10	786	(Malaysia) Aaron Lim	Am	3–4
(Thailand) / Amerasian Fragrance by AF Racing; (Thailand) / B-Quik Absolute Racing; (Thailand) / Winhere By B-Quik Absolute Racing; (Thailand) / Renazzo Motor with Absolute Racing	Audi R8 LMS Evo II	Audi DAR 5.2 L V10	786	(Malaysia) Haziq Zairel Oh	Am	3–4
(Malaysia) Viper Niza Racing	Mercedes-AMG GT3 Evo	Mercedes-AMG M159 6.2 L V8	65	(Malaysia) Douglas Khoo	Am	1, 3–4
Supercar GT4
(Thailand) AAS Motorsport	Porsche 718 Cayman GT4 RS Clubsport	Porsche MDG.GA 4.0 L Flat-6	1	(Thailand) Kmik Karnasuta	PA	All
(Thailand) AAS Motorsport	Porsche 718 Cayman GT4 RS Clubsport	Porsche MDG.GA 4.0 L Flat-6	1	(Thailand) Kantadhee Kusiri	PA	All
(Thailand) AAS Motorsport	Porsche 718 Cayman GT4 RS Clubsport	Porsche MDG.GA 4.0 L Flat-6	99	(Thailand) Dechathorn Phuakkarawut	PA	All
(Thailand) AAS Motorsport	Porsche 718 Cayman GT4 RS Clubsport	Porsche MDG.GA 4.0 L Flat-6	99	(Thailand) Thanapattra Sutthisawang	PA	All
(New Zealand) Team NZ	Aston Martin Vantage AMR GT4	Aston Martin M177 4.0 L Turbo V8	7	(New Zealand) Graeme Dowsett	PA	All
(New Zealand) Team NZ	Aston Martin Vantage AMR GT4	Aston Martin M177 4.0 L Turbo V8	7	(France) Romain Leroux	PA	All
Toyota Gazoo Racing Thailand	Toyota GR Supra GT4	Toyota B58 3.0 L Twin Turbo I6	19	(Thailand) Suttipong Smittachartch	Am	All
Toyota Gazoo Racing Thailand	Toyota GR Supra GT4	Toyota B58 3.0 L Twin Turbo I6	19	(Thailand) Grant Supaphongs	Am	All
(Thailand) B-Quik Absolute Racing	Porsche 718 Cayman GT4 RS Clubsport	Porsche MDG.GA 4.0 L Flat-6	32	(Madagascar) Iaro Razanakato	Am	All
(Thailand) B-Quik Absolute Racing	Porsche 718 Cayman GT4 RS Clubsport	Porsche MDG.GA 4.0 L Flat-6	32	(Thailand) Sathaporn Veerachure	Am	All
(Thailand) Alpha Factory Racing Team by Pulzar	Toyota GR Supra GT4 Evo2	Toyota B58H 3.0 L Twin Turbo I6	33	(Thailand) Phaophong Chanchalia	PA	All
(Thailand) Alpha Factory Racing Team by Pulzar	Toyota GR Supra GT4 Evo2	Toyota B58H 3.0 L Twin Turbo I6	33	(Thailand) Phuwapon Thaweekraikun	PA	All
(Malaysia) Racing Aurora	Mercedes-AMG GT4	Mercedes-AMG M178 4.0 L V8	36	(Australia) Daniel Bilski	PA	All
(Malaysia) Racing Aurora	Mercedes-AMG GT4	Mercedes-AMG M178 4.0 L V8	36	(Malaysia) Hayden Haikal	PA	All
(Malaysia) Wing Hin Motorsport	Toyota GR Supra GT4 Evo2	Toyota B58H 3.0 L Twin Turbo I6	39	(Malaysia) Naquib Azlan	PA	All
(Malaysia) Wing Hin Motorsport	Toyota GR Supra GT4 Evo2	Toyota B58H 3.0 L Twin Turbo I6	39	(Malaysia) Mitchell Cheah Min Jie	PA	All
(Thailand) Aim Motor Sports	Mercedes-AMG GT4	Mercedes-AMG M178 4.0 L V8	44	(Thailand) Prutirat Ratanakul Serireongrith	Am	1–4
(Thailand) / Inging Autowerks Racing (Note: Car No. 98 entered as Feynlab Racing, and car No. 58, No. 59 & No. 95 entered as Inging Autowerks Racing.); (Thailand) / Feynlab Racing	Toyota GR Supra GT4	Toyota B58 3.0 L Twin Turbo I6	59	(Thailand) Andrew Adulayavichitr	Am	1–2
(Thailand) / Inging Autowerks Racing; (Thailand) / Feynlab Racing	Toyota GR Supra GT4	Toyota B58 3.0 L Twin Turbo I6	59	(Thailand) Kachorn Chiaravanont	Am	1–2
(Thailand) / Inging Autowerks Racing; (Thailand) / Feynlab Racing	Toyota GR Supra GT4	Toyota B58 3.0 L Twin Turbo I6	95	(Thailand) Prakhun Phornprapha	PA	All
(Thailand) / Inging Autowerks Racing; (Thailand) / Feynlab Racing	Toyota GR Supra GT4	Toyota B58 3.0 L Twin Turbo I6	95	(Thailand) Nanin Indra-Payoong	PA	1, 5
(Thailand) / Inging Autowerks Racing; (Thailand) / Feynlab Racing	Toyota GR Supra GT4	Toyota B58 3.0 L Twin Turbo I6	95	(Japan) Kazuhisa Urabe	PA	2, 4
(Thailand) / Inging Autowerks Racing; (Thailand) / Feynlab Racing	Toyota GR Supra GT4	Toyota B58 3.0 L Twin Turbo I6	95	(Japan) Yuui Tsutsumi	PA	3
(Thailand) / Inging Autowerks Racing; (Thailand) / Feynlab Racing	Porsche 718 Cayman GT4 RS Clubsport	Porsche MDG.GA 4.0 L Flat-6	98	(Australia) Todd James Kingsford	Am	1–4
Pain Killer Racing Thailand	Toyota GR Supra GT4 Evo2	Toyota B58 3.0 L Twin Turbo I6	60	(Thailand) Shuipang Kanjanapas	Am	1–4
Pain Killer Racing Thailand	Toyota GR Supra GT4 Evo2	Toyota B58 3.0 L Twin Turbo I6	60	(Japan) Hideharu Kuroki	Am	1
Supercar GTM
Toyota Gazoo Racing Thailand	Toyota GR Supra GTM	Toyota B58 3.0 L Twin Turbo I6	9	(Thailand) Nattapong Horthongkum	PA	All
Toyota Gazoo Racing Thailand	Toyota GR Supra GTM	Toyota B58 3.0 L Twin Turbo I6	9	(Thailand) Manat Kulapalanont	PA	All
Toyota Gazoo Racing Thailand	Toyota GR Supra GTM	Toyota B58 3.0 L Twin Turbo I6	24	(Thailand) Nattavude Charoensukhawatana	Am	All
(Malaysia) Fire Monkey Motorsport	Porsche 991 GT3 II Cup	Porsche M97/80 4.0 L Flat-6	10	(Hong Kong) Simon Sye Wai Chan	Am	All
Singha Motorsport Team Thailand	Ferrari 488 Challenge Evo	Ferrari F154CB 3.9 L Turbo V8	25	(Thailand) Supakit Jenjitranun	PA	1–2
Singha Motorsport Team Thailand	Ferrari 488 Challenge Evo	Ferrari F154CB 3.9 L Turbo V8	25	(Thailand) Kittipol Pramoj Na Ayudhya	PA	1–2
(Thailand) PSC Motorsport	Ferrari 296 Challenge	Ferrari F163BC 3.0 L Turbo V6	77	(Thailand) Saraput Sereethoranakul	PA	2–5
(Thailand) PSC Motorsport	Ferrari 296 Challenge	Ferrari F163BC 3.0 L Turbo V6	77	(Malaysia) Afiq Yazid	PA	2–5
(New Zealand) CRE Racing	Ford Mustang MARC GT SS	GM LS3 6.0 L V8	88	(New Zealand) Craig Corliss	PA	5
(New Zealand) CRE Racing	Ford Mustang MARC GT SS	GM LS3 6.0 L V8	88	(Australia) Jaylyn Robotham	PA	5

Icon	Class
Drivers
PA	Pro-Am
Am	Am

=== Supercar GTC ===
Team	Car	Engine	No.	Drivers	Rounds
(Thailand) Tecpro Barriers Racing	Ford RR Motorsport Daytona GT Coupe	Ford Aluminator XS 5.2 L V8	2	(Thailand) Siramedt Thungsuteeranonkul	1
(Thailand) Tecpro Barriers Racing	Ford RR Motorsport Daytona GT Coupe	Ford Aluminator XS 5.2 L V8	65	(France) Rafaël Galiana	2
(Thailand) Tecpro Barriers Racing	Ford RR Motorsport Daytona GT Coupe	Ford Aluminator XS 5.2 L V8	65	(Italy) Gianni Morbidelli	2
Toyota Gazoo Racing Thailand	Toyota Altis GTC	Toyota G16E-GTS 1.6 L Turbo I3	9	(Thailand) Akkarapong Akkaneenirot	1–2, 4–5
Toyota Gazoo Racing Thailand	Toyota Altis GTC	Toyota G16E-GTS 1.6 L Turbo I3	9	(Thailand) Kris Vasuratna	1–2, 4–5
(Thailand) B-Quik Absolute Racing	Porsche Cayman GT4 981	Porsche MA1/24 3.8 L Flat-6	18	(United Kingdom) Geekie Ian Ross	4
(Singapore) Team Supersonic By Rongpo Power Unit	Honda Civic Type R TCR (FK8)	Honda K20C1 2.0 L Turbo I4	23	(Singapore) Shane Ang	1–2, 4
(Singapore) Team Supersonic By Rongpo Power Unit	Honda Civic Type R TCR (FK8)	Honda K20C1 2.0 L Turbo I4	23	(Singapore) Kenneth Ho	1–2, 4
(Thailand) C&C Motorsports-Amone-Nexzter-KS Racing	Lamborghini Gallardo Super Trofeo	Lamborghini CEH 5.2 L V10	77	(Philippines) Manuel Rafael Caceres	1
(Thailand) C&C Motorsports-Amone-Nexzter-KS Racing	Lamborghini Gallardo Super Trofeo	Lamborghini CEH 5.2 L V10	77	(Thailand) Jack Lemvard	1
(Thailand) FR Motorsport	Transam NZ TA2 (Ford Mustang)	GM LS3 6.2 L V8	88	(Australia) Damien Hamilton	1–2, 4–5
(Thailand) Amerasian Fragrance by AF Racing	Transam NZ TA2 (Ford Mustang)	GM LS3 6.2 L V8	111	(Thailand) Carl Bennett	1
(Thailand) Amerasian Fragrance by AF Racing	Transam NZ TA2 (Ford Mustang)	GM LS3 6.2 L V8	111	(United States) Gregory Bennett	1

== Results ==
Round		Circuit	GT3 Pole Position	GT3 Race Winner	GT4 Pole Position	GT4 Race Winner
1	R1	(Thailand) Buriram	No. 12 Singha Motorsport Team Thailand	No. 12 Singha Motorsport Team Thailand	(Malaysia) No. 39 Wing Hin Motorsport	(Thailand) No. 1 AAS Motorsport
1	R1	(Thailand) Buriram	(Thailand) Piti Bhirombhakdi (Thailand) Kantasak Kusiri	(Thailand) Piti Bhirombhakdi (Thailand) Kantasak Kusiri	(Malaysia) Naquib Azlan (Malaysia) Mitchell Cheah Min Jie	(Thailand) Kmik Karnasuta (Thailand) Kantadhee Kusiri
1	R2	(Thailand) Buriram	(Thailand) No. 786 Renazzo Motor with Absolute Racing	(New Zealand) No. 18 AAS Motorsport by EBM	(Thailand) No. 1 AAS Motorsport	(Thailand) No. 1 AAS Motorsport
1	R2	(Thailand) Buriram	(Poland) Karol Basz (Thailand) Sak Nana	(Germany) Laurin Heinrich (Thailand) Vutthikorn Inthraphuvasak	(Thailand) Kmik Karnasuta (Thailand) Kantadhee Kusiri	(Thailand) Kmik Karnasuta (Thailand) Kantadhee Kusiri
2	R1	(Thailand) Bangsaen	(Thailand) No. 37 Winhere By B-Quik Absolute Racing	(New Zealand) No. 18 AAS Motorsport by EBM	(Thailand) No. 1 AAS Motorsport	(Thailand) No. 95 Inging Autowerks Racing
2	R1	(Thailand) Bangsaen	(China) Deng Yi (Malaysia) Akash Nandy	(Germany) Laurin Heinrich (Thailand) Vutthikorn Inthraphuvasak	(Thailand) Kmik Karnasuta (Thailand) Kantadhee Kusiri	(Thailand) Prakhun Phornprapha (Japan) Kazuhisa Urabe
2	R2	(Thailand) Bangsaen	(New Zealand) No. 18 AAS Motorsport by EBM	(Thailand) No. 37 Winhere By B-Quik Absolute Racing	(Thailand) No. 1 AAS Motorsport	(Thailand) No. 1 AAS Motorsport
2	R2	(Thailand) Bangsaen	(Germany) Laurin Heinrich (Thailand) Vutthikorn Inthraphuvasak	(China) Deng Yi (Malaysia) Akash Nandy	(Thailand) Kmik Karnasuta (Thailand) Kantadhee Kusiri	(Thailand) Kmik Karnasuta (Thailand) Kantadhee Kusiri
3	R1	(Malaysia) Sepang	(New Zealand) No. 18 AAS Motorsport by EBM	(New Zealand) No. 18 AAS Motorsport by EBM	(Malaysia) No. 39 Wing Hin Motorsport	(Malaysia) No. 39 Wing Hin Motorsport
3	R1	(Malaysia) Sepang	(Germany) Laurin Heinrich (Thailand) Vutthikorn Inthraphuvasak	(Germany) Laurin Heinrich (Thailand) Vutthikorn Inthraphuvasak	(Malaysia) Naquib Azlan (Malaysia) Mitchell Cheah Min Jie	(Malaysia) Naquib Azlan (Malaysia) Mitchell Cheah Min Jie
3	R2	(Malaysia) Sepang	(New Zealand) No. 18 AAS Motorsport by EBM	(Thailand) No. 27 B-Quik Absolute Racing	(Thailand) No. 1 AAS Motorsport	(Malaysia) No. 39 Wing Hin Motorsport
3	R2	(Malaysia) Sepang	(Germany) Laurin Heinrich (Thailand) Vutthikorn Inthraphuvasak	(Malaysia) Akash Nandy (Thailand) Adisak Tangphuncharoen	(Thailand) Kmik Karnasuta (Thailand) Kantadhee Kusiri	(Malaysia) Naquib Azlan (Malaysia) Mitchell Cheah Min Jie
4	R1	(Malaysia) Sepang	(New Zealand) No. 18 AAS Motorsport by EBM	No. 12 Singha Motorsport Team Thailand	(Malaysia) No. 39 Wing Hin Motorsport	(Thailand) No. 98 Feynlab Racing
4	R1	(Malaysia) Sepang	(France) Dorian Boccolacci (Thailand) Vutthikorn Inthraphuvasak	(Thailand) Piti Bhirombhakdi (Thailand) Kantasak Kusiri	(Malaysia) Naquib Azlan (Malaysia) Mitchell Cheah Min Jie	(Australia) Todd James Kingsford
4	R2	(Malaysia) Sepang	No. 12 Singha Motorsport Team Thailand	(New Zealand) No. 18 AAS Motorsport by EBM	(Thailand) No. 95 Inging Autowerks Racing	(Malaysia) No. 36 Racing Aurora
4	R2	(Malaysia) Sepang	(Thailand) Piti Bhirombhakdi (Thailand) Kantasak Kusiri	(France) Dorian Boccolacci (Thailand) Vutthikorn Inthraphuvasak	(Thailand) Prakhun Phornprapha (Japan) Kazuhisa Urabe	(Australia) Daniel Bilski (Malaysia) Hayden Haikal
5	R1	(Thailand) Buriram	No. 12 Singha Motorsport Team Thailand	(New Zealand) No. 18 AAS Motorsport by EBM	(Malaysia) No. 39 Wing Hin Motorsport	(Thailand) No. 1 AAS Motorsport
5	R1	(Thailand) Buriram	(Thailand) Piti Bhirombhakdi (Thailand) Kantasak Kusiri	(Germany) Laurin Heinrich (Thailand) Vutthikorn Inthraphuvasak	(Malaysia) Naquib Azlan (Malaysia) Mitchell Cheah Min Jie	(Thailand) Kmik Karnasuta (Thailand) Kantadhee Kusiri
5	R2	(Thailand) Buriram	No. 12 Singha Motorsport Team Thailand	No. 12 Singha Motorsport Team Thailand	(Thailand) No. 1 AAS Motorsport	(Malaysia) No. 39 Wing Hin Motorsport
5	R2	(Thailand) Buriram	(Thailand) Piti Bhirombhakdi (Thailand) Kantasak Kusiri	(Thailand) Piti Bhirombhakdi (Thailand) Kantasak Kusiri	(Thailand) Kmik Karnasuta (Thailand) Kantadhee Kusiri	(Malaysia) Naquib Azlan (Malaysia) Mitchell Cheah Min Jie
Round		Circuit	GTM Pole Position	GTM Race Winner	GTC Pole Position	GTC Race Winner
1	R1	(Thailand) Buriram	(China) No. 10 Fire Monkey Motorsport	No. 25 Singha Motorsport Team Thailand	(Thailand) No. 77 C&C Motorsports-Amone-Nexzter-KS Racing	(Singapore) No. 23 Team Supersonic By Rongpo Power Unit
1	R1	(Thailand) Buriram	(Hong Kong) Simon Sye Wai Chan	(Thailand) Supakit Jenjitranun (Thailand) Kittipol Pramoj Na Ayudhya	(Philippines) Manuel Rafael Caceres (Thailand) Jack Lemvard	(Singapore) Shane Ang (Singapore) Kenneth Ho
1	R2	(Thailand) Buriram	No. 9 Toyota Gazoo Racing Thailand	No. 25 Singha Motorsport Team Thailand	(Thailand) No. 88 FR Motorsport	(Thailand) No. 2 Tecpro Barriers Racing
1	R2	(Thailand) Buriram	(Thailand) Nattapong Horthongkum (Thailand) Manat Kulapalanont	(Thailand) Supakit Jenjitranun (Thailand) Kittipol Pramoj Na Ayudhya	(Australia) Damien Hamilton	(Thailand) Siramedt Thungsuteeranonkul
2	R1	(Thailand) Bangsaen	(China) No. 10 Fire Monkey Motorsport	(Thailand) No. 77 PSC Motorsport	No. 9 Toyota Gazoo Racing Thailand	(Singapore) No. 23 Team Supersonic By Rongpo Power Unit
2	R1	(Thailand) Bangsaen	(Hong Kong) Simon Sye Wai Chan	(Thailand) Saraput Sereethoranakul (Malaysia) Afiq Yazid	(Thailand) Akkarapong Akkaneenirot (Thailand) Kris Vasuratna	(Singapore) Shane Ang (Singapore) Kenneth Ho
2	R2	(Thailand) Bangsaen	(Thailand) No. 77 PSC Motorsport	(Thailand) No. 77 PSC Motorsport	(Thailand) No. 2 Tecpro Barriers Racin	No. 9 Toyota Gazoo Racing Thailand
2	R2	(Thailand) Bangsaen	(Thailand) Saraput Sereethoranakul (Malaysia) Afiq Yazid	(Thailand) Saraput Sereethoranakul (Malaysia) Afiq Yazid	(France) Rafaël Galiana (Italy) Gianni Morbidelli	(Thailand) Akkarapong Akkaneenirot (Thailand) Kris Vasuratna
3	R1	(Malaysia) Sepang	(Thailand) No. 77 PSC Motorsport	No. 24 Toyota Gazoo Racing Thailand	did not participate	
3	R1	(Malaysia) Sepang	(Thailand) Saraput Sereethoranakul (Malaysia) Afiq Yazid	(Thailand) Nattavude Charoensukhawatana	did not participate	
3	R2	(Malaysia) Sepang	(Thailand) No. 77 PSC Motorsport	(Thailand) No. 77 PSC Motorsport	did not participate	
3	R2	(Malaysia) Sepang	(Thailand) Saraput Sereethoranakul (Malaysia) Afiq Yazid	(Thailand) Saraput Sereethoranakul (Malaysia) Afiq Yazid	did not participate	
4	R1	(Malaysia) Sepang	(Thailand) No. 77 PSC Motorsport	(Thailand) No. 77 PSC Motorsport	(Thailand) No. 88 FR Motorsport	No. 9 Toyota Gazoo Racing Thailand
4	R1	(Malaysia) Sepang	(Thailand) Saraput Sereethoranakul (Malaysia) Afiq Yazid	(Thailand) Saraput Sereethoranakul (Malaysia) Afiq Yazid	(Australia) Damien Hamilton	(Thailand) Akkarapong Akkaneenirot (Thailand) Kris Vasuratna
4	R2	(Malaysia) Sepang	(Thailand) No. 77 PSC Motorsport	(Thailand) No. 77 PSC Motorsport	(Singapore) No. 23 Team Supersonic By Rongpo Power Unit	(Thailand) No. 18 B-Quik Absolute Racing
4	R2	(Malaysia) Sepang	(Thailand) Saraput Sereethoranakul (Malaysia) Afiq Yazid	(Thailand) Saraput Sereethoranakul (Malaysia) Afiq Yazid	(Singapore) Shane Ang (Singapore) Kenneth Ho	(United Kingdom) Geekie Ian Ross
5	R1	(Thailand) Buriram	(New Zealand) No. 88 CRE Racing	(New Zealand) No. 88 CRE Racing	(Thailand) No. 88 FR Motorsport	(Thailand) No. 88 FR Motorsport
5	R1	(Thailand) Buriram	(New Zealand) Craig Corliss (Australia) Jaylyn Robotham	(New Zealand) Craig Corliss (Australia) Jaylyn Robotham	(Australia) Damien Hamilton	(Australia) Damien Hamilton
5	R2	(Thailand) Buriram	(New Zealand) No. 88 CRE Racing	(New Zealand) No. 88 CRE Racing	(Thailand) No. 88 FR Motorsport	No. 9 Toyota Gazoo Racing Thailand
5	R2	(Thailand) Buriram	(New Zealand) Craig Corliss (Australia) Jaylyn Robotham	(New Zealand) Craig Corliss (Australia) Jaylyn Robotham	(Australia) Damien Hamilton	(Thailand) Akkarapong Akkaneenirot (Thailand) Kris Vasuratna

== Championship standings ==
Scoring system

Championship points are awarded for the first ten positions in each race. Entries are required to complete 75% of the winning car's race distance in order to be classified and earn points.

Position	**1st**	**2nd**	**3rd**	**4th**	**5th**	**6th**	**7th**	**8th**	**9th**	**10th**
Points	25	18	15	12	10	8	6	4	2	1

=== Drivers' championships ===
==== Overall ====
Pos.	Driver	Team	BUR (Thailand)		BAN (Thailand)		SEP (Malaysia)		SEP (Malaysia)		BUR (Thailand)		Points
GT3
1	(Thailand) Vutthikorn Inthraphuvasak	(New Zealand) AAS Motorsport by EBM	2	1	1	Ret	**1**	**3**	**2**	1	1	2	197
2	(Thailand) Piti Bhirombhakdi (Thailand) Kantasak Kusiri	Singha Motorsport Team Thailand	**1**	2	3	2	2	6	1	**3**	2	**1**	187
3	(Germany) Laurin Heinrich	(New Zealand) AAS Motorsport by EBM	2	1	1	Ret	**1**	**3**			1	2	154
4	(Netherlands) Henk Kiks (Thailand) Sandy Stuvik	(Thailand) B-Quik Absolute Racing	4	3	5	4	3	5	3	5	4	5	123
5	(Thailand) Voravud Bhirombhakdi (Netherlands) Carlo van Dam	Singha Motorsport Team Thailand	DNS	5	7	3	5	4	4	4	3	4	109
6	(Malaysia) Aaron Lim (Malaysia) Haziq Zairel Oh	(Thailand) Renazzo Motor with Absolute Racing					4	2	5	2			65
7	(Thailand) Sak Nana	(Thailand) Renazzo Motor with Absolute Racing	3	**Ret**	6	Ret					5	3	48
8	(China) Deng Yi (Malaysia) Akash Nandy	(Thailand) Winhere By B-Quik Absolute Racing			2	1							43
9	(Poland) Karol Basz	(Thailand) Renazzo Motor with Absolute Racing	3	**Ret**							5	3	40
10	(Malaysia) Douglas Khoo	(Malaysia) Viper Niza Racing	WD	WD			6	7	6	6			32
11	(United States) Gregory Bennett	(Thailand) Amerasian Fragrance by AFRacing	WD	WD	4	Ret							12
11	(New Zealand) Chris van der Drift	(Thailand) Amerasian Fragrance by AFRacing			4	Ret							12
12	(Germany) Dieter Schmidtmann	(Thailand) Renazzo Motor with Absolute Racing			6	Ret							8
—	(Thailand) Carl Bennett	(Thailand) Amerasian Fragrance by AFRacing	WD	WD									0
—	(France) Dorian Boccolacci	(New Zealand) AAS Motorsport by EBM							**2**	1			0
—	(Thailand) Adisak Tangphuncharoen (Note: Guest drivers ineligible to score points)	(Thailand) B-Quik Absolute Racing	5	4			Ret	1					0
—	(Malaysia) Akash Nandy	(Thailand) B-Quik Absolute Racing					Ret	1					0
—	(Thailand) Sathaporn Veerachure	(Thailand) B-Quik Absolute Racing	5	4									0
GT4
1	(Malaysia) Naquib Azlan (Malaysia) Mitchell Cheah Min Jie	(Malaysia) Wing Hin Motorsport	**3**	2	2	Ret	**1**	**1**	**3**	2	**2**	1	177
2	(Thailand) Kmik Karnasuta (Thailand) Kantadhee Kusiri	(Thailand) AAS Motorsport	1	**1**	**4**	**1**	2	**3**	5	Ret	1	**5**	165
3	(Australia) Daniel Bilski (Malaysia) Hayden Haikal	(Malaysia) Racing Aurora	6	7	Ret	2	4	2	4	1	3	2	132
4	(Thailand) Prakhun Phornprapha	(Thailand) Inging Autowerks Racing	5	9	1	3	3	Ret	6	**4**	5	7	103
5	(Australia) Todd James Kingsford	(Thailand) Feynlab Racing	2	8	5	5	6	4	1	3			102
6	(Madagascar) Iaro Razanakato (Thailand) Sathaporn Veerachure	(Thailand) B-Quik Absolute Racing	4	3	Ret	6	7	Ret	2	8	Ret	3	78
7	(Japan) Kazuhisa Urabe	(Thailand) Inging Autowerks Racing	WD	WD	1	3			6	**4**			60
8	(Thailand) Dechathorn Phuakkarawut (Thailand) Thanapattra Sutthisawang	(Thailand) AAS Motorsport	DSQ	5	Ret	DNS	5	8	7	7	4	4	60
9	(Thailand) Phaophong Chanchalia (Thailand) Phuwapon Thaweekraikun	(Thailand) Alpha Factory Racing Team by Pulzar	7	6	Ret	7	9	5	9	6	6	6	58
10	(New Zealand) Graeme Dowsett (France) Romain Leroux	(New Zealand) Team NZ	8	4	3	4	8	Ret	8	9	8	DSQ	57
11	(Thailand) Suttipong Smittachartch (Thailand) Grant Supaphongs	Toyota Gazoo Racing Thailand	11	10	8	Ret	10	7	10	5	7	8	35
12	(Thailand) Nanin Indra-Payoong	(Thailand) 2W Zoomies	5	9							5	7	28
13	(Japan) Yuui Tsutsumi	(Thailand) Inging Autowerks Racing					3	Ret					15
14	(Thailand) Shuipang Kanjanapas	Pain Killer Racing Thailand	10	11	6	8	11	9					15
15	(Thailand) Prutirat Ratanakul Serireongrith	(Thailand) Aim Motor Sports	9	12	7	Ret	Ret	7	11	10			15
16	(Japan) Hideharu Kuroki	Pain Killer Racing Thailand	10	11	WD	WD							2
—	(Thailand) Andrew Adulayavichitr (Thailand) Kachorn Chiaravanont	(Thailand) Inging Autowerks Racing	WD	WD	WD	WD							0
GTM
1	(Thailand) Saraput Sereethoranakul (Malaysia) Afiq Yazid	(Thailand) PSC Motorsport			1	1	1	3	1	1	2	2	190
2	(Thailand) Nattavude Charoensukhawatana	Toyota Gazoo Racing Thailand	4	2	3	2	2	1	4	2	3	3	175
3	(Hong Kong) Simon Sye Wai Chan	(China) Fire Monkey Motorsport	**2**	3	**2**	3	4	2	2	2	4	4	159
4	(Thailand) Nattapong Horthongkum (Thailand) Manat Kulapalanont	Toyota Gazoo Racing Thailand	3	**4**	4	4	3	Ret	5	4	5	5	114
5	(Thailand) Supakit Jenjitranun (Thailand) Kittipol Pramoj Na Ayudhya	Singha Motorsport Team Thailand	1	1	WD	WD							50
—	(New Zealand) Craig Corliss (Australia) Jaylyn Robotham	(New Zealand) CRE Racing									**1**	**1**	0
GTC
1	(Singapore) Shane Ang (Singapore) Kenneth Ho	(Singapore) Supersonic By Rongpo Power Unit	1	2	1	2			3	**2**			119
2	(Thailand) Akkarapong Akkaneenirot (Thailand) Kris Vasuratna	Toyota Gazoo Racing Thailand	Ret	DNS	**Ret**	1			1	Ret	2	1	93
3	(Thailand) Damien Hamilton	(Thailand) FR Motorsport	2	**DNS**	Ret	Ret			**Ret**	3	**1**	**2**	61
4	(Thailand) Siramedt Thungsuteeranonkul	(Thailand) Tecpro Barriers Racing	3	1	Ret	DNS							40
—	(Philippines) Manuel Rafael Caceres (Thailand) Jack Lemvard	(Thailand) C&C Motorsports-Amone-Nexzter-KS Racing	**Ret**	DNS									0
—	(Thailand) Carl Bennett (United States) Gregory Bennett	(Thailand) Amerasian Fragrance by AFRacing	WD	WD									0
—	(United Kingdom) Geekie Ian Ross	(Thailand) B-Quik Absolute Racing							2	1			0
—	(France) Rafaël Galiana (Italy) Gianni Morbidelli	(Thailand) Tecpro Barriers Racing			Ret	**Ret**							0
Pos.	Driver	Team	BUR (Thailand)		BAN (Thailand)		SEP (Malaysia)		SEP (Malaysia)		BUR (Thailand)		Points

Colour	Result
Gold	Winner
Silver	Second place
Bronze	Third place
Green	Points classification
Blue	Non-points classification
Blue	Non-classified finish (NC)
Purple	Retired, not classified (Ret)
Red	Did not qualify (DNQ)
Red	Did not pre-qualify (DNPQ)
Black	Disqualified (DSQ)
White	Did not start (DNS)
White	Withdrew (WD)
White	Race cancelled (C)
Blank	Did not practice (DNP)
Blank	Did not arrive (DNA)
Blank	Excluded (EX)

**Bold** – Pole

Guest drivers ineligible to score points

==== Am ====
Pos.	Driver	Team	BUR (Thailand)		BAN (Thailand)		SEP (Malaysia)		SEP (Malaysia)		BUR (Thailand)		Points
GT3
1	(Malaysia) Aaron Lim (Malaysia) Haziq Zairel Oh	(Thailand) Renazzo Motor with Absolute Racing					1	1	1	1			100
2	(Malaysia) Douglas Khoo	(Malaysia) Viper Niza Racing	WD	WD			2	2	2	2			72
3	(Thailand) Sak Nana (Germany) Dieter Schmidtmann	(Thailand) Renazzo Motor with Absolute Racing			1	Ret							25
—	(Thailand) Adisak Tangphuncharoen (Thailand) Sathaporn Veerachure	(Thailand) B-Quik Absolute Racing	1	1	WD	WD							0
GT4
1	(Australia) Todd James Kingsford	(Thailand) Feynlab Racing	1	2	1	1	1	1	1	1			183
2	(Thailand) Suttipong Smittachartch (Thailand) Grant Supaphongs	Toyota Gazoo Racing Thailand	5	3	4	Ret	3	2	3	2	1	2	146
3	(Madagascar) Iaro Razanakato (Thailand) Sathaporn Veerchue	(Thailand) B-Quik Absolute Racing	2	1	Ret	2	2	Ret	2	3	Ret	1	137
4	(Thailand) Shuipang Kanjanapas	Pain Killer Racing Thailand	4	4	2	3	4	4					81
5	(Thailand) Prutirat Ratanakul Serireongrith	(Thailand) Aim Motor Sports	3	12	3	Ret	Ret	3	4	4			79
6	(Japan) Hideharu Kuroki	Pain Killer Racing Thailand	4	4	WD	WD							24
—	(Thailand) Andrew Adulayavichitr (Thailand) Kachorn Chiaravanont	(Thailand) Inging Autowerks Racing	WD	WD	WD	WD							0
GTM
1	(Thailand) Nattavude Charoensukhawatana	Toyota Gazoo Racing Thailand	2	1	2	1	1	1	2	1	1	1	229
2	(Hong Kong) Simon Sye Wai Chan	(China) Fire Monkey Motorsport	1	2	1	2	2	2	1	2	2	2	201
Pos.	Driver	Team	BUR (Thailand)		BAN (Thailand)		SEP (Malaysia)		SEP (Malaysia)		BUR (Thailand)		Points

==== Porsche Sprint Trophy Thailand ====
Pos.	Driver	Team	BUR (Thailand)		BAN (Thailand)		SEP (Malaysia)		SEP (Malaysia)		BUR (Thailand)		Points
GT3
1	(Thailand) Vutthikorn Inthraphuvasak	(New Zealand) AAS Motorsport by EBM	1	1	1	Ret	1	1	1	1	1	1	225
2	(Netherlands) Henk Kiks (Thailand) Sandy Stuvik	(Thailand) B-Quik Absolute Racing	2	2	2	1	2	2	2	2	2	2	187
3	(Germany) Laurin Heinrich	(New Zealand) AAS Motorsport by EBM	1	1	1	Ret	1	1			1	1	175
—	(France) Dorian Boccolacci	(New Zealand) AAS Motorsport by EBM							1	1			0
GT4
1	(Thailand) Kmik Karnasuta (Thailand) Kantadhee Kusiri	(Thailand) AAS Motorsport	1	1	1	1	1	1	3	Ret	1	3	205
2	(Australia) Todd James Kingsford	(Thailand) Feynlab Racing	2	4	2	2	3	2	1	1			149
3	(Madagascar) Iaro Razanakato (Thailand) Sathaporn Veerchue	(Thailand) B-Quik Absolute Racing	3	2	Ret	3	4	Ret	2	3	Ret	1	118
4	(Thailand) Dechathorn Phuakkarawut (Thailand) Thanapattra Sutthisawang	(Thailand) AAS Motorsport	DSQ	3	Ret	DNS	2	3	3	2	2	2	114
GTM
1	(Hong Kong) Simon Sye Wai Chan	(China) Fire Monkey Motorsport	1	1	1	1	1	1	1	1	1	1	250
Pos.	Driver	Team	BUR (Thailand)		BAN (Thailand)		SEP (Malaysia)		SEP (Malaysia)		BUR (Thailand)		Points

=== Teams' championships ===
Pos.	Team	BUR (Thailand)		BAN (Thailand)		SEP (Malaysia)		SEP (Malaysia)		BUR (Thailand)		Points
GT3
1	Singha Motorsport Team Thailand	1	2	3	2	2	4	1	3	2	1	298
1	Singha Motorsport Team Thailand	DNS	5	7	3	5	6	4	4	3	4	298
2	(Thailand) B-Quik Absolute Racing	4	3	5	4	3	2	3	2	4	3	235
2	(Thailand) B-Quik Absolute Racing	3	Ret	6	Ret	4	5	5	5	5	5	235
3	(New Zealand) AAS Motorsport by EBM	2	1	1	Ret	1	3	2	1	1	2	197
4	(Thailand) Winhere By B-Quik Absolute Racing			2	1							43
5	(Malaysia) Viper Niza Racing	WD	WD			6	7	6	6			32
6	(Thailand) Amerasian Fragrance by AFRacing	WD	WD	4	Ret							12
GT4
1	(Thailand) AAS Motorsport	1	1	4	1	2	3	5	7	1	4	223
1	(Thailand) AAS Motorsport	DSQ	5	Ret	DNS	5	8	7	Ret	4	6	223
2	(Malaysia) Wing Hin Motorsport	3	2	2	Ret	1	1	3	2	2	1	177
3	(Malaysia) Racing Aurora	6	7	Ret	2	4	2	4	1	3	2	132
4	(Thailand) Feynlab Racing	2	8	5	5	6	4	1	3			102
5	(Thailand) Inging Autowerks Racing	5	9	1	3	3	Ret	6	4	5	8	101
5	(Thailand) Inging Autowerks Racing	WD	WD	WD	WD							101
6	(Thailand) B-Quik Absolute Racing	4	3	Ret	6	7	Ret	2	8	Ret	3	72
7	(New Zealand) Team NZ	8	4	3	4	8	Ret	8	9	8	5	67
8	(Thailand) Alpha Factory Racing Team by Pulzar	7	6	Ret	7	9	5	9	6	6	7	56
9	Toyota Gazoo Racing Thailand	11	10	8	Ret	10	7	10	5	7	9	33
10	Pain Killer Racing Thailand	10	11	6	8	11	9					15
11	(Thailand) Aim Motor Sports	9	12	7	Ret	Ret	7	11	10			15
GTM
1	Toyota Gazoo Racing Thailand	3	2	3	2	2	1	3	2	2	2	289
1	Toyota Gazoo Racing Thailand	4	4	4	4	3	Ret	4	4	4	4	289
2	(Thailand) PSC Motorsport			1	1	1	3	1	1	1	1	190
3	(China) Fire Monkey Motorsport	2	3	2	3	4	2	2	3	3	3	159
4	Singha Motorsport Team Thailand	1	1	WD	WD							50
GTC
1	(Singapore) Supersonic By Rongpo Power Unit	1	2	1	2			3	2			119
2	Toyota Gazoo Racing Thailand	Ret	DNS	Ret	1			1	Ret	2	1	93
3	(Thailand) FR Motorsport	2	DNS	Ret	Ret			Ret	3	1	2	76
4	(Thailand) B-Quik Absolute Racing							2	1			43
5	(Thailand) Tecpro Barriers Racing	3	1	Ret	DNS							40
—	(Thailand) C&C Motorsports-Amone-Nexzter-KS Racing	Ret	DNS									0
—	(Thailand) Amerasian Fragrance by AFRacing	WD	WD									0
Pos.	Team	BUR (Thailand)		BAN (Thailand)		SEP (Malaysia)		SEP (Malaysia)		BUR (Thailand)		Points

== See also ==
- 2025 GT World Challenge Asia
- 2025 SRO Japan Cup
