= Naquib Azlan =

Malaysian racing driver (born 2000)

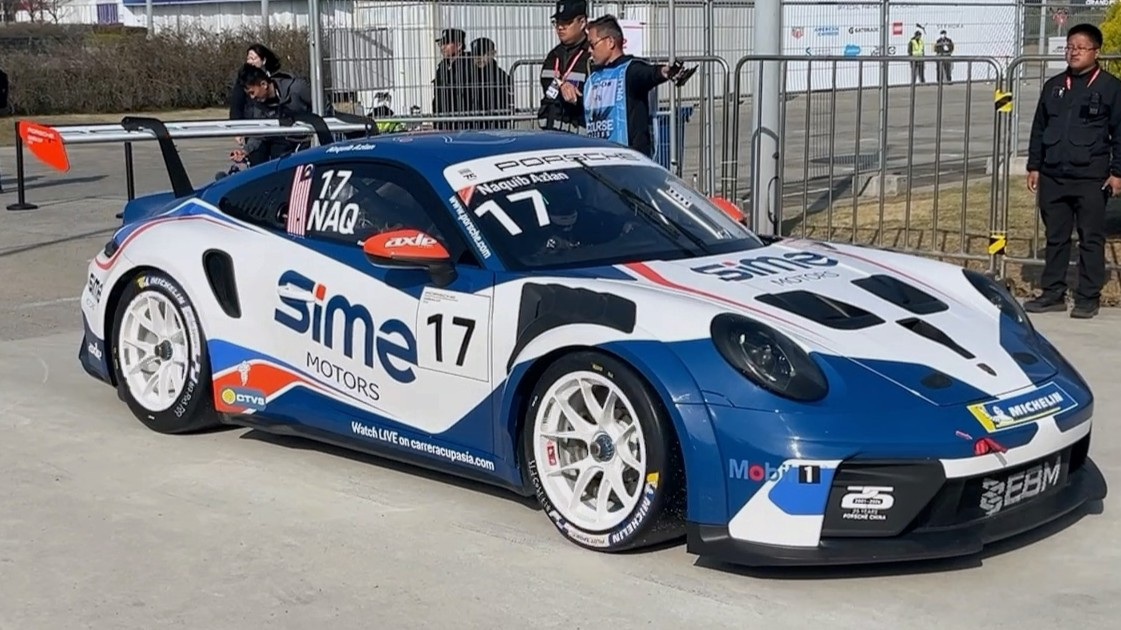
- Azlan driving in the 2026 Porsche Carrera Cup Asia Shanghai round
- Nationality: (Malaysia) Malaysian
- Born: Muhammad Naquib bin Nor Azlan; 18 September 2000 (age 26) Kuala Terengganu, Terengganu, Malaysia

Previous series
- 2025 2024–25 2022–24: TGR GR86/BRZ Cup; Thailand Super Series; Malaysian Championship Series

Championship titles
- 2025 2025: Thailand Super Series - Supercar GT4; TGR GR86/BRZ Cup - Clubman

Muhammad Naquib bin Nor Azlan (born 18 September 2000) is a Malaysian racing driver and sim racer who currently competes in the Porsche Carrera Cup Asia for Team Porsche Malaysia.

== Career ==
=== Early career ===
Unlike the vast majority of professional racing drivers, Naquib did not begin his racing career via karting, but instead made his first foray into motorsport through competitive sim racing in 2020. His success in eRacing GP events, organized and overseen by Alex Yoong, led Naquib and his brother Nabil to be taken in as protégés of the former Formula One driver. In esports, Naquib has represented Malaysia twice in the FIA Motorsport Games, and is a two-time champion on Assetto Corsa in the Asia Pacific Motorsport Championship.

Naquib made his debut in real-life motorsport in 2021 after being selected as a member of the Gazoo Racing Young Talent Development Program in September 2020, operated by the Malaysian arm of Toyota. With the support of Toyota Malaysia and its affiliated importer Wing Hin, which operates the eponymous Wing Hin Motorsports racing team, Naquib spent the next three seasons competing exclusively in local-level production car races, driving a Toyota Vios largely alongside teammates Mitchell Cheah Min Jie and Tengku Djan Ley (the latter of whom he would go on to win the Sepang 1000 km endurance race with in 2022.)

After racing abroad for the first time in a round of the Idemitsu Super Endurance series at Buriram in late 2023, Naquib pivoted to Thailand for a full-time campaign in the Thailand Super Series alongside Cheah in 2024. He moved up to GT4-class competition mid-season, competing in a Toyota GR Supra GT4, and went on to win the championship title in GT4 the following year alongside a championship-winning campaign in the Clubman class of the Japanese Toyota Gazoo Racing GR86/BRZ Cup, where he was coached by Toyota factory driver Masahiro Sasaki.

=== Porsche Carrera Cup Asia ===
Following the 2025 season and a title in the Porsche Esports Sprint Challenge Malaysia, Naquib was selected for an audition in the Porsche Carrera Cup Asia Talent Pool assessment in view of a race seat for the 2026 season. After setting the fastest lap time of the test, beating out internationally established drivers including Akshay Bohra, Kaleb Ngatoa, and the eventually selected Alex Sawer and Liu Ruiqi, Naquib was confirmed to compete for the Earl Bamber Motorsport-operated Team Porsche Malaysia for 2026 in what would become his debut in international motorsport.

== Racing record ==
=== Career summary ===
Season	Series	Team	Races	Wins	Poles	FLaps	Podiums	Points	Position
2021	TGR Festival Vios Challenge - Rookie	Toyota Gazoo Racing Malaysia	6	3	3	?	5	101	**1st**
2021	Sepang 1000 km - M-Production	Toyota Gazoo Racing Malaysia	1	0	0	0	0	N/A	NC
2022	Malaysian Championship Series - M-Production	Wing Hin Motorsports	6	0	?	?	4	57	**3rd**
2022	TGR Festival Vios Challenge - Sporting	Axle Sports	6	5	3	?	5	108	**1st**
2022	MSF Merdeka Race - Standard Production	Axle Sports	1	0	1	0	1	N/A	**2nd**
2022	Sepang 1000 km - M-Production	Toyota Gazoo Racing Malaysia	1	1	1	0	1	N/A	**1st**
2023	Malaysian Championship Series - M-Production	Wing Hin Motorsports	6	1	0	?	2	?	**3rd**
2023	Idemitsu Super Endurance Southeast Asia Trophy - D3	Wing Hin Motorsports	2	1	0	1	2	?	?
2023	TGR Festival Vios Challenge - Super Sporting	Toyota Gazoo Racing Malaysia	6	1	1	?	1	49	6th
2023	Sepang 1000 km - M-Production	Toyota Gazoo Racing Malaysia	1	0	0	0	1	N/A	**3rd**
2024	Thailand Super Series - Super Compact	Wing Hin Motorsports	8	1	?	0	4	104	**2nd**
2024	Thailand Super Series - Supercar GT4	Wing Hin Motorsports	6	1	?	1	6	109	4th
2024	Malaysian Championship Series - M-Production	Wing Hin Motorsports	6	?	?	?	?	?	?
2024	Idemitsu Super Endurance Thailand 25 Hours - D4	Wing Hin Motorsports	1	0	0	0	1	N/A	**2nd**
2024	TGR Festival Vios Challenge - Super Sporting	TGR Team Axle Sports	6	1	?	?	2	95	**1st**
2024	Sepang 1000 km - M-Production	Toyota Gazoo Racing Malaysia	1	0	0	0	0	N/A	7th
2025	TSS The Super Series - Supercar GT4	Wing Hin Motorsports	10	3	5	?	9	177	**1st**
2025	TGR GR86/BRZ Cup - Clubman	Wing Hin Motorsports × Moty's	6	4	2	2	5	107	**1st**
2025	GR86 Cup Malaysia Series	Stratos Motorsports	4	1	?	?	2	?	?
2025	Toyota Gazoo Racing Vios Challenge - Super Sporting	Toyota Gazoo Racing Malaysia	6	2	2	?	?	?	?
2026	Porsche Carrera Cup Asia	Team Porsche Malaysia	12	1	6	1	3	121.5	5th
2026	Super Taikyū - ST-Z	Wing Hin Motorsports Japan							
2026	China GT Championship - GTS	Origin7 Racing							
2026	TSS The Super Series - Supercar GTM	Fire Monkey X Silver Rocket							

=== Complete Porsche Carrera Cup Asia results ===
(key) (Races in bold indicate pole position; races in italics indicate points for the fastest lap of top ten finishers)

Year	Entrant	Class	Chassis	1	2	3	4	5	6	7	8	9	10	11	12	13	DC	Points
2026	Team Porsche Malaysia	Pro	911 GT3 Cup	**SIC**; **1**; 1	**SIC**; **2** DNS	**ZIC**; **1**; 4	**ZIC**; **2**; 13	FSW; 1 Ret	**FSW**; **2**; 2	BAN; 1	BAN; 2	SEP; 1	SEP; 2	SEP; 3	MRN; 1	MRN; 2	6th*	54.5*
