= 2026 TSS The Super Series =

Sports car racing series season

The 2026 TSS The Super Series by B-Quik is the thirteenth season of the TSS The Super Series, a South-East Asian sports car racing series organised by the TSS and in partnership with SRO Motorsports Group. The season began on 21 May at Chang International Circuit and will finish on 1 November, also at Chang International Circuit. The races are contested with GT3-spec, GT Cup-spec and GT4-spec cars.

== Calendar ==
Round 4 was supposed to be held at Sepang International Circuit on 19 to 20 September 2026, but with Formula One move it's Bahrain Grand Prix to Malaysia 4 October, the event has to be postponed. The series will replace the second Sepang round to third Buriram round on 12 to 13 December.

Round	Circuit	Date	Location
1	Chang International Circuit, Buriram, Thailand	23–24 May	2026 TSS The Super Series is located in Southeast Asia
2	Bangsaen Street Circuit, Chonburi, Thailand	4–5 July	2026 TSS The Super Series is located in Southeast Asia
3	Sepang International Circuit, Sepang District, Malaysia	22–23 August	2026 TSS The Super Series is located in Southeast Asia
4	Chang International Circuit, Buriram, Thailand	31 October – 1 November	2026 TSS The Super Series is located in Southeast Asia
5	Chang International Circuit, Buriram, Thailand	12–13 December	2026 TSS The Super Series is located in Southeast Asia

== Entry list ==
Team	Car	Engine	No.	Drivers	Class	Rounds
Supercar GT3
(New Zealand) Team NZ Motorsport	Mercedes-AMG GT3 Evo	Mercedes-AMG M159 6.2 L V8	7	(New Zealand) Graeme Dowsett	PA	3
(New Zealand) Team NZ Motorsport	Mercedes-AMG GT3 Evo	Mercedes-AMG M159 6.2 L V8	7	(New Zealand) Chris van der Drift	PA	3
Singha Motorsport Team Thailand	Honda NSX GT3 Evo22	Honda JNC1 3.5 L Turbo V6	12	(Thailand) Piti Bhirombhakdi	PA	1–4
Singha Motorsport Team Thailand	Honda NSX GT3 Evo22	Honda JNC1 3.5 L Turbo V6	12	(Thailand) Kantasak Kusiri	PA	1–4
Singha Motorsport Team Thailand	Ferrari 296 GT3	Ferrari F163CE 3.0 L Turbo V6	89	(Thailand) Voravud Bhirombhakdi	PA	1–4
Singha Motorsport Team Thailand	Ferrari 296 GT3	Ferrari F163CE 3.0 L Turbo V6	89	(Netherlands) Carlo van Dam	PA	1–4
(Australia) Black Wolf Motorsport	Mercedes-AMG GT3 Evo	Mercedes-AMG M159 6.2 L V8	16	(Australia) Ben Schoots	Am	1–2
(Australia) Black Wolf Motorsport	Mercedes-AMG GT3 Evo	Mercedes-AMG M159 6.2 L V8	16	(Australia) Shane Woodman	Am	1–2
(Thailand) B-Quik Absolute Racing	Porsche 911 GT3 R (992)	Porsche M97/80 4.2 L Flat-6	26	(Netherlands) Henk Kiks	PA	1–4
(Thailand) B-Quik Absolute Racing	Porsche 911 GT3 R (992)	Porsche M97/80 4.2 L Flat-6	26	(France) Alessandro Ghiretti	PA	1–3
(Thailand) B-Quik Absolute Racing	Porsche 911 GT3 R (992)	Porsche M97/80 4.2 L Flat-6	26	(Italy) Enzo Trulli	PA	4
(Thailand) B-Quik Absolute Racing	Audi R8 LMS Evo II	Audi DAR 5.2 L V10	27	(Australia) Daniel Bilski	Am	1–4
(Thailand) B-Quik Absolute Racing	Audi R8 LMS Evo II	Audi DAR 5.2 L V10	27	(Thailand) Sathaporn Veerachure	Am	1–4
(Thailand) B-Quik Absolute Racing	Audi R8 LMS Evo II	Audi DAR 5.2 L V10	888	(Madagascar) Iaro Razanakato	PA	1–4
(Thailand) B-Quik Absolute Racing	Audi R8 LMS Evo II	Audi DAR 5.2 L V10	888	(Thailand) Sandy Stuvik	PA	1–4
Supercar GTM (GT3 Cup cars)
(Thailand) Krm. Kon Rak Mia	Porsche 992 GT3 Cup (992.1)	Porsche 4.0 L Flat-6	8	(Thailand) Sontaya Kunplome	Am	1–3
(Malaysia) Fire Monkey X Silver Rocket	Porsche 992 GT3 Cup (992.1)	Porsche 4.0 L Flat-6	10	(China) Alex Li Jia	Am	1–2, 4
(Malaysia) Fire Monkey X Silver Rocket	Porsche 992 GT3 Cup (992.1)	Porsche 4.0 L Flat-6	10	(Hong Kong) Simon Chan Sye Wai	Am	1–2
(Malaysia) Fire Monkey X Silver Rocket	Porsche 992 GT3 Cup (992.1)	Porsche 4.0 L Flat-6	10	(Malaysia) Naquib Azlan	Am	4
(Thailand) PSC Motorsport	KTM X-Bow GT2	Audi DNWA 2.5 L Turbo I5	55	(New Zealand) Jono Lester	PA	1–2
(Thailand) PSC Motorsport	KTM X-Bow GT2	Audi DNWA 2.5 L Turbo I5	55	(Thailand) Sarun Sereetharanakhul	PA	1–2
(Thailand) PSC Motorsport	Ferrari 296 Challenge	Ferrari F163BC 3.0 L Turbo V6	77	(Thailand) Saravut Sereethoranakul	PA	1–4
(Thailand) PSC Motorsport	Ferrari 296 Challenge	Ferrari F163BC 3.0 L Turbo V6	77	(Malaysia) Afiq Yazid	PA	1–4
(New Zealand) CRE Racing	Ford Mustang MARC GT SS	GM LS3 6.0 L V8	88	(New Zealand) Craig Corliss	PA	1–4
(New Zealand) CRE Racing	Ford Mustang MARC GT SS	GM LS3 6.0 L V8	88	(Australia) Jaylyn Robotham	PA	1–4
Supercar GT4
(Thailand) AAS Motorsport	Porsche 718 Cayman GT4 RS Clubsport	Porsche MDG.GA 4.0 L Flat-6	9	(Thailand) Kmik Karnasuta	PA	1–4
(Thailand) AAS Motorsport	Porsche 718 Cayman GT4 RS Clubsport	Porsche MDG.GA 4.0 L Flat-6	9	(Thailand) Thanapattra Sutthisawang	PA	1–4
(Thailand) AAS Motorsport	Porsche 718 Cayman GT4 RS Clubsport	Porsche MDG.GA 4.0 L Flat-6	99	(Thailand) Kantadhee Kusiri	PA	1–4
(Thailand) AAS Motorsport	Porsche 718 Cayman GT4 RS Clubsport	Porsche MDG.GA 4.0 L Flat-6	99	(Thailand) Dechathorn Phuakkarawut	PA	1–4
Toyota Gazoo Racing Thailand	Toyota GR Supra GT4 Evo2	Toyota B58 3.0 L Turbo I6	11	(Thailand) Akkarapong Akkaneenirot	PA	1–4
Toyota Gazoo Racing Thailand	Toyota GR Supra GT4 Evo2	Toyota B58 3.0 L Turbo I6	11	(Thailand) Kris Vasuratna	PA	1–4
Toyota Gazoo Racing Thailand	Toyota GR Supra GT4 Evo2	Toyota B58 3.0 L Turbo I6	19	(Thailand) Suttipong Smittachartch	Am	1–4
Toyota Gazoo Racing Thailand	Toyota GR Supra GT4 Evo2	Toyota B58 3.0 L Turbo I6	19	(Thailand) Grant Supaphongs	Am	1–4
(Thailand) N-Sports, Acre, Singha Team Vattana	Toyota GR Supra GT4 Evo2	Toyota B58 3.0 L Turbo I6	16	(Thailand) Traitanit Chimtawan	PA	1
(Thailand) N-Sports, Acre, Singha Team Vattana	Toyota GR Supra GT4 Evo2	Toyota B58 3.0 L Turbo I6	16	(Thailand) Nattanan Puretongkam	PA	1
(Thailand) Inging x Autowerks Racing	Toyota GR Supra GT4 Evo2	Toyota B58 3.0 L Turbo I6	22	(Thailand) Voraput Phornprapha	Am	1–2
(Thailand) Inging x Autowerks Racing	Toyota GR Supra GT4 Evo2	Toyota B58 3.0 L Turbo I6	22	(Thailand) Warren Adulayavichitr	Am	1
(Thailand) Inging x Autowerks Racing	Toyota GR Supra GT4 Evo2	Toyota B58 3.0 L Turbo I6	22	(Thailand) Thanaroj Tanasitnitikate	Am	2–3
(Thailand) Inging x Autowerks Racing	Toyota GR Supra GT4 Evo2	Toyota B58 3.0 L Turbo I6	22	(Thailand) Thanakorn Liewphairatana	Am	3–4
(Thailand) Inging x Autowerks Racing	Toyota GR Supra GT4 Evo2	Toyota B58 3.0 L Turbo I6	22	(Thailand) Prachpok Luesakulkitpaisal	Am	3–4
(Thailand) Inging x Autowerks Racing	Toyota GR Supra GT4 Evo2	Toyota B58 3.0 L Turbo I6	95	(Thailand) Prakhun Phornprapha	Am	1–4
(Thailand) Inging x Autowerks Racing	Toyota GR Supra GT4 Evo2	Toyota B58 3.0 L Turbo I6	95	(Thailand) Andrew Adulayavichitr	Am	1
(Thailand) Inging x Autowerks Racing	Toyota GR Supra GT4 Evo2	Toyota B58 3.0 L Turbo I6	95	(Australia) Todd Kingsford	Am	2–4
(Malaysia) Wing Hin Motorsports	Toyota GR Supra GT4 Evo2	Toyota B58 3.0 L Turbo I6	39	(Malaysia) Mitchell Cheah Min Jie	PA	1–4
(Malaysia) Wing Hin Motorsports	Toyota GR Supra GT4 Evo2	Toyota B58 3.0 L Turbo I6	39	(Hong Kong) Ryan Wong Siu Yin	PA	1–4
Toyota Gazoo Racing Indonesia	Toyota GR Supra GT4 Evo2	Toyota B58 3.0 L Turbo I6	139	(Indonesia) Haridarma Manoppo	PA	3–4
Toyota Gazoo Racing Indonesia	Toyota GR Supra GT4 Evo2	Toyota B58 3.0 L Turbo I6	139	(Indonesia) Syaukat Takuma Soejatmo	PA	3–4
(Malaysia) Petrolife Racing Team	Toyota GR Supra GT4 Evo2	Toyota B58 3.0 L Turbo I6	77	(Thailand) Ananthorn Tangniannatchai	PA	1–4
(Malaysia) Petrolife Racing Team	Toyota GR Supra GT4 Evo2	Toyota B58 3.0 L Turbo I6	77	(Malaysia) Hayden Haikal	PA	1
(Malaysia) Petrolife Racing Team	Toyota GR Supra GT4 Evo2	Toyota B58 3.0 L Turbo I6	77	(Thailand) Supakit Jenjitranun	PA	2–4
(Macau) Elegant Racing Team	Mercedes-AMG GT4	Mercedes-AMG M178 4.0 L V8	219	(Macau) Liu Weng Hin	PA	2–3
(Macau) Elegant Racing Team	Mercedes-AMG GT4	Mercedes-AMG M178 4.0 L V8	219	(Macau) Liu Lic Ka	PA	3
(Malaysia) R Engineering	Porsche 718 Cayman GT4 RS Clubsport	Porsche MDG.GA 4.0 L Flat-6	611	(Finland) Elias Seppänen	PA	3
(Malaysia) R Engineering	Porsche 718 Cayman GT4 RS Clubsport	Porsche MDG.GA 4.0 L Flat-6	611	(China) Xu Xin	PA	3
Supercar GTC (Modified GT cars)
(Thailand) B-Quik Absolute Racing	Porsche 718 Cayman GT4 RS Clubsport	Porsche MDG.GA 4.0 L Flat-6	18	(Australia) Ian Ross Geekie		4
Toyota Gazoo Racing Thailand	Toyota Altis GTC	Toyota G16E-GTS 1.6 L Turbo I3	24	(Thailand) Nattavude Charoensukhawatana		1–2, 4
Toyota Gazoo Racing Thailand	Toyota Altis GTC	Toyota G16E-GTS 1.6 L Turbo I3	24	(Thailand) Na Dol Vatanatham		1–2, 4
Toyota Gazoo Racing Thailand	Toyota GR Supra GTC (3S)	Toyota G16E-GTS 1.6 L Turbo I3	37	(Thailand) Nattapong Horthongkum		1–2, 4
Toyota Gazoo Racing Thailand	Toyota GR Supra GTC (3S)	Toyota G16E-GTS 1.6 L Turbo I3	37	(Thailand) Manat Kulapalanont		1–2, 4
(Thailand) Turtle Monster Racing	Transam NZ TA2 (Ford Mustang)	GM LS3 6.2 L V8	35	(Turkey) Cem Yudulmaz		2, 4
(Thailand) Speed Factory / ETS	Transam NZ TA2 (Ford Mustang)	GM LS3 6.2 L V8	88	(Australia) Damien Hamilton		1

Icon	Class
Drivers
PA	Pro-Am
Am	Am

== Results ==
Round		Circuit	Supercar GT3		Supercar GTM	
Round		Circuit	Supercar GT3 Pole Position	Supercar GT3 Race Winner	Supercar GTM Pole Position	Supercar GTM Race Winner
1	R1	(Thailand) Buriram	No. 12 Singha Motorsport Team Thailand	No. 12 Singha Motorsport Team Thailand	(Thailand) No. 77 PSC Motorsport	(Thailand) No. 77 PSC Motorsport
1	R1	(Thailand) Buriram	(Thailand) Piti Bhirombhakdi (Thailand) Kantasak Kusiri	(Thailand) Piti Bhirombhakdi (Thailand) Kantasak Kusiri	(Thailand) Saraput Sereethoranakul (Malaysia) Afiq Yazid	(Thailand) Saraput Sereethoranakul (Malaysia) Afiq Yazid
1	R2	(Thailand) Buriram	(Thailand) No. 888 B-Quik Absolute Racing	(Thailand) No. 27 B-Quik Absolute Racing	(Thailand) No. 77 PSC Motorsport	(Thailand) No. 77 PSC Motorsport
1	R2	(Thailand) Buriram	(Madagascar) Iaro Razanakato (Thailand) Sandy Stuvik	(Australia) Daniel Bilski (Thailand) Sathaporn Veerachure	(Thailand) Saraput Sereethoranakul (Malaysia) Afiq Yazid	(Thailand) Saraput Sereethoranakul (Malaysia) Afiq Yazid
2	R1	(Thailand) Bangsaen	No. 89 Singha Motorsport Team Thailand	No. 89 Singha Motorsport Team Thailand	(New Zealand) No. 88 CRE Racing	(Thailand) No. 77 PSC Motorsport
2	R1	(Thailand) Bangsaen	(Thailand) Voravud Bhirombhakdi (Netherlands) Carlo van Dam	(Thailand) Voravud Bhirombhakdi (Netherlands) Carlo van Dam	(New Zealand) Craig Corliss (Australia) Jaylyn Robotham	(Thailand) Saraput Sereethoranakul (Malaysia) Afiq Yazid
2	R2	(Thailand) Bangsaen	No. 89 Singha Motorsport Team Thailand	No. 12 Singha Motorsport Team Thailand	(Thailand) No. 77 PSC Motorsport	(Thailand) No. 77 PSC Motorsport
2	R2	(Thailand) Bangsaen	(Thailand) Voravud Bhirombhakdi (Netherlands) Carlo van Dam	(Thailand) Piti Bhirombhakdi (Thailand) Kantasak Kusiri	(Thailand) Saraput Sereethoranakul (Malaysia) Afiq Yazid	(Thailand) Saraput Sereethoranakul (Malaysia) Afiq Yazid
3	R1	(Malaysia) Sepang	No. 12 Singha Motorsport Team Thailand	No. 12 Singha Motorsport Team Thailand	(Thailand) No. 77 PSC Motorsport	(Thailand) No. 77 PSC Motorsport
3	R1	(Malaysia) Sepang	(Thailand) Piti Bhirombhakdi (Thailand) Kantasak Kusiri	(Thailand) Piti Bhirombhakdi (Thailand) Kantasak Kusiri	(Thailand) Saraput Sereethoranakul (Malaysia) Afiq Yazid	(Thailand) Saraput Sereethoranakul (Malaysia) Afiq Yazid
3	R2	(Malaysia) Sepang	(Thailand) No. 26 B-Quik Absolute Racing	No. 12 Singha Motorsport Team Thailand	(Thailand) No. 77 PSC Motorsport	(Thailand) No. 77 PSC Motorsport
3	R2	(Malaysia) Sepang	(France) Alessandro Ghiretti (Netherlands) Henk Kiks	(Thailand) Piti Bhirombhakdi (Thailand) Kantasak Kusiri	(Thailand) Saraput Sereethoranakul (Malaysia) Afiq Yazid	(Thailand) Saraput Sereethoranakul (Malaysia) Afiq Yazid
4	R1	(Thailand) Buriram	No. 89 Singha Motorsport Team Thailand	No. 12 Singha Motorsport Team Thailand	(New Zealand) No. 88 CRE Racing	(Malaysia) No. 10 Fire Monkey x Silver Rocket
4	R1	(Thailand) Buriram	(Thailand) Voravud Bhirombhakdi (Netherlands) Carlo van Dam	(Thailand) Piti Bhirombhakdi (Thailand) Kantasak Kusiri	(New Zealand) Craig Corliss (Australia) Jaylyn Robotham	(Malaysia) Naquib Azlan (China) Alex Li Jia
4	R2	(Thailand) Buriram	(Thailand) No. 26 B-Quik Absolute Racing	(Thailand) No. 26 B-Quik Absolute Racing	(Malaysia) No. 10 Fire Monkey x Silver Rocket	(Thailand) No. 77 PSC Motorsport
4	R2	(Thailand) Buriram	(Netherlands) Henk Kiks (Italy) Enzo Trulli	(Madagascar) Iaro Razanakato (Thailand) Sandy Stuvik	(Malaysia) Naquib Azlan (China) Alex Li Jia	(Thailand) Saraput Sereethoranakul (Malaysia) Afiq Yazid
5	R1	(Thailand) Buriram				
5	R2	(Thailand) Buriram				
Round		Circuit	Supercar GT4		Supercar GTC	
Round		Circuit	Supercar GT4 Pole Position	Supercar GT4 Race Winner	Supercar GTC Pole Position	Supercar GTC Race Winner
1	R1	(Thailand) Buriram	(Malaysia) No. 77 Petrolife Racing Team	(Thailand) No. 95 Inging x Autowerks Racing	No. 24 Toyota Gazoo Racing Thailand	No. 24 Toyota Gazoo Racing Thailand
1	R1	(Thailand) Buriram	(Malaysia) Hayden Haikal (Thailand) Ananthorn Tangniannatchai	(Thailand) Andrew Adulayavichitr (Thailand) Prakhun Phornprapha	(Thailand) Nattavude Charoensukhawatana (Thailand) Na Dol Vatanatham	(Thailand) Nattavude Charoensukhawatana (Thailand) Na Dol Vatanatham
1	R2	(Thailand) Buriram	(Malaysia) No. 39 Wing Hin Motorsports	(Thailand) No. 91 AAS Motorsport	No. 24 Toyota Gazoo Racing Thailand	No. 37 Toyota Gazoo Racing Thailand
1	R2	(Thailand) Buriram	(Malaysia) Mitchell Cheah Min Jie (Hong Kong) Ryan Wong Siu Yin	(Thailand) Kantadhee Kusiri (Thailand) Dechathorn Phuakkarawut	(Thailand) Nattavude Charoensukhawatana (Thailand) Na Dol Vatanatham	(Thailand) Nattapong Horthongkum (Thailand) Manat Kulapalanont
2	R1	(Thailand) Bangsaen	(Malaysia) No. 77 Petrolife Racing Team	(Thailand) No. 91 AAS Motorsport	No. 37 Toyota Gazoo Racing Thailand	No. 24 Toyota Gazoo Racing Thailand
2	R1	(Thailand) Bangsaen	(Thailand) Supakit Jenjitranun (Thailand) Ananthorn Tangniannatchai	(Thailand) Kantadhee Kusiri (Thailand) Dechathorn Phuakkarawut	(Thailand) Nattapong Horthongkum (Thailand) Manat Kulapalanont	(Thailand) Nattavude Charoensukhawatana (Thailand) Na Dol Vatanatham
2	R2	(Thailand) Bangsaen	(Thailand) No. 91 AAS Motorsport	(Malaysia) No. 77 Petrolife Racing Team	No. 37 Toyota Gazoo Racing Thailand	No. 24 Toyota Gazoo Racing Thailand
2	R2	(Thailand) Bangsaen	(Thailand) Kantadhee Kusiri (Thailand) Dechathorn Phuakkarawut	(Thailand) Supakit Jenjitranun (Thailand) Ananthorn Tangniannatchai	(Thailand) Nattapong Horthongkum (Thailand) Manat Kulapalanont	(Thailand) Nattapong Horthongkum (Thailand) Manat Kulapalanont
3	R1	(Malaysia) Sepang	(Malaysia) No. 77 Petrolife Racing Team	(Thailand) No. 95 Inging x Autowerks Racing	did not participate	
3	R1	(Malaysia) Sepang	(Thailand) Supakit Jenjitranun (Thailand) Ananthorn Tangniannatchai	(Australia) Todd Kingsford (Thailand) Prakhun Phornprapha	did not participate	
3	R2	(Malaysia) Sepang	(Malaysia) No. 77 Petrolife Racing Team	(Thailand) No. 95 Inging x Autowerks Racing	did not participate	
3	R2	(Malaysia) Sepang	(Thailand) Supakit Jenjitranun (Thailand) Ananthorn Tangniannatchai	(Australia) Todd Kingsford (Thailand) Prakhun Phornprapha	did not participate	
4	R1	(Thailand) Buriram	(Malaysia) No. 77 Petrolife Racing Team	(Malaysia) No. 39 Wing Hin Motorsports	No. 24 Toyota Gazoo Racing Thailand	No. 24 Toyota Gazoo Racing Thailand
4	R1	(Thailand) Buriram	(Thailand) Supakit Jenjitranun (Thailand) Ananthorn Tangniannatchai	(Malaysia) Mitchell Cheah Min Jie (Hong Kong) Ryan Wong Siu Yin	(Thailand) Nattavude Charoensukhawatana (Thailand) Na Dol Vatanatham	(Thailand) Nattavude Charoensukhawatana (Thailand) Na Dol Vatanatham
4	R2	(Thailand) Buriram	(Thailand) No. 91 AAS Motorsport	(Thailand) No. 91 AAS Motorsport	No. 24 Toyota Gazoo Racing Thailand	No. 24 Toyota Gazoo Racing Thailand
4	R2	(Thailand) Buriram	(Thailand) Kantadhee Kusiri (Thailand) Dechathorn Phuakkarawut	(Thailand) Kantadhee Kusiri (Thailand) Dechathorn Phuakkarawut	(Thailand) Nattavude Charoensukhawatana (Thailand) Na Dol Vatanatham	(Thailand) Nattavude Charoensukhawatana (Thailand) Na Dol Vatanatham
5	R1	(Thailand) Buriram				
5	R2	(Thailand) Buriram				

== Championship standings ==
Scoring system

Championship points are awarded for the first ten positions in each race. Entries are required to complete 75% of the winning car's race distance in order to be classified and earn points.

Position	**1st**	**2nd**	**3rd**	**4th**	**5th**	**6th**	**7th**	**8th**	**9th**	**10th**
Points	25	18	15	12	10	8	6	4	2	1

=== Drivers' championships ===
==== Overall ====
Pos.	Driver	Team	BUR (Thailand)		BAN (Thailand)		SEP (Malaysia)		BUR (Thailand)		BUR (Thailand)	Points
Supercar GT3
1	(Thailand) Piti Bhirombhakdi (Thailand) Kantasak Kusiri	Singha Motorsport Team Thailand	**1**	4	3	1	**1**	1	1	2		170
2	(Netherlands) Henk Kiks	(Thailand) B-Quik Absolute Racing	2	2	2	2	Ret	**6**	5	4		102
3	(Australia) Daniel Bilski (Thailand) Sathaporn Veerachure	(Thailand) B-Quik Absolute Racing	3	1	Ret	Ret	3	4	2	3		100
4	(Thailand) Voravud Bhirombhakdi (Netherlands) Carlo van Dam	Singha Motorsport Team Thailand	4	5	**1**	**Ret**	4	2	3	Ret		92
5	(France) Alessandro Ghiretti	(Thailand) B-Quik Absolute Racing	2	2	2	2	Ret	**6**				80
6	(Madagascar) Iaro Razanakato (Thailand) Sandy Stuvik	(Thailand) B-Quik Absolute Racing	5	**Ret**	Ret	3	Ret	3	4	1		77
7	(Australia) Ben Schoots (Australia) Shane Woodman	(Australia) Black Wolf Motorsport	6	3	4	4						47
8	(New Zealand) Graeme Dowsett (New Zealand) Chris van der Drift	(New Zealand) Team NZ Motorsport					2	5				28
9	(Italy) Enzo Trulli	(Thailand) B-Quik Absolute Racing							5	4		22
Supercar GTM
1	(Thailand) Saravut Sereethoranakul (Malaysia) Afiq Yazid	(Thailand) PSC Motorsport	**1**	**1**	1	**1**	**1**	**1**	2	1		168
2	(China) Alex Li Jia	(Malaysia) Fire Monkey X Silver Rocket	3	2	3	3			1	**2**		99
3	(New Zealand) Craig Corliss (Australia) Jaylyn Robotham	(New Zealand) CRE Racing	2	3	**2**	2	WD	WD	**Ret**	Ret		69
4	(Hong Kong) Simon Chan Sye Wai	(Malaysia) Fire Monkey X Silver Rocket	3	2	3	3						63
5	(Malaysia) Naquib Azlan	(Malaysia) Fire Monkey X Silver Rocket							1	**2**		43
—	(Thailand) Sontaya Kunplome	(Thailand) Krm. Kon Rak Mia	WD	WD	Ret	DNS	DNS	DNS				0
—	(New Zealand) Jono Lester (Thailand) Sarun Sereetharanakhul	(Thailand) PSC Motorsport	WD	WD	WD	WD						0
Supercar GT4
1	(Thailand) Kantadhee Kusiri (Thailand) Dechathorn Phuakkarawut	(Thailand) AAS Motorsport	6	1	1	**2**	3	2	4	**1**		146
2	(Thailand) Ananthorn Tangniannatchai	(Malaysia) Petrolife Racing Team	**4**	2	**3**	1	**7**	**3**	2	3		124
3	(Thailand) Prakhun Phornprapha	(Thailand) Inging x Autowerks Racing	1	7	Ret	DNS	1	1	3	2		104
4	(Malaysia) Mitchell Cheah Min Jie (Hong Kong) Ryan Wong Siu Yin	(Malaysia) Wing Hin Motorsports	2	**5**	2	Ret	2	5	1	Ret		99
5	(Australia) Todd Kingsford	(Thailand) Inging x Autowerks Racing			Ret	4	1	1	3	2		95
6	(Thailand) Supakit Jenjitranun	(Malaysia) Petrolife Racing Team			**3**	1	**7**	**3**	2	3		94
7	(Thailand) Kmik Karnasuta (Thailand) Thanapattra Sutthisawang	(Thailand) AAS Motorsport	5	3	4	3	8	7	5	6		80
8	(Thailand) Akkarapong Akkaneenirot (Thailand) Kris Vasuratna	Toyota Gazoo Racing Thailand	3	4	DNS	DNS	5	4	6	4		69
9	(Thailand) Suttipong Smittachartch (Thailand) Grant Supaphongs	Toyota Gazoo Racing Thailand	8	8	6	6	11	8	8	7		38
10	(Thailand) Andrew Adulayavichitr	(Thailand) Inging x Autowerks Racing	1	7								31
11	(Malaysia) Hayden Haikal	(Malaysia) Petrolife Racing Team	**4**	2								30
12	(Thailand) Thanakorn Liewphairatana (Thailand) Prachpok LuesaKulkitpaisal	(Thailand) Inging x Autowerks Racing					9	6	7	5		26
13	(Macau) Raymond Liu Weng Hin	(Macau) Elegant Racing Team			5	5	10	9				23
14	(Indonesia) Haridarma Manoppo (Indonesia) Syaquat Takuma Soejatmo	Toyota Gazoo Racing Indonesia					4	Ret	WD	WD		12
15	(Finland) Elias Seppänen (China) Xu Xin	(Malaysia) R Engineering					6	10				9
16	(Thailand) Voraput Phornprapha	(Thailand) Inging x Autowerks Racing	Ret	6	WD	WD						8
17	(Thailand) Warren Adulayavichitr	(Thailand) Inging x Autowerks Racing	Ret	6								8
18	(Thailand) Traitanit Chimtawan (Thailand) Nattanan Puretongkam	(Thailand) N-Sports, Acre, Singha Team Vattana	7	9								8
19	(Macau) Alex Liu Lic Ka	(Macau) Elegant Racing Team					10	9				3
—	(Thailand) Thanaroj Tanasitnitikate	(Thailand) Inging x Autowerks Racing			WD	WD	WD	WD				0
Supercar GTC
1	(Thailand) Nattapong Horthongkum (Thailand) Manat Kulapalanont	Toyota Gazoo Racing Thailand	2	1	**2**	**1**			2	3		119
2	(Thailand) Nattavude Charoensukhawatana (Thailand) Na Dol Vatanatham	Toyota Gazoo Racing Thailand	**1**	**Ret**	1	2			**1**	**1**		118
3	(Turkey) Cem Yudulmaz	(Thailand) Turtle Monster Racing			Ret	Ret			4	2		30
4	(Australia) Ian Ross Geekie	(Thailand) B-Quik Absolute Racing							3	4		27
—	(Australia) Damien Hamilton	(Thailand) Speed Factory / ETS	DNS	Ret								0
Pos.	Driver	Team	BUR (Thailand)		BAN (Thailand)		SEP (Malaysia)		BUR (Thailand)		BUR (Thailand)	Points

Colour	Result
Gold	Winner
Silver	Second place
Bronze	Third place
Green	Points classification
Blue	Non-points classification
Blue	Non-classified finish (NC)
Purple	Retired, not classified (Ret)
Red	Did not qualify (DNQ)
Red	Did not pre-qualify (DNPQ)
Black	Disqualified (DSQ)
White	Did not start (DNS)
White	Withdrew (WD)
White	Race cancelled (C)
Blank	Did not practice (DNP)
Blank	Did not arrive (DNA)
Blank	Excluded (EX)

**Bold** – Pole

Guest drivers ineligible to score points

==== Am ====
Pos.	Driver	Team	BUR (Thailand)		BAN (Thailand)		SEP (Malaysia)		BUR (Thailand)		BUR (Thailand)	Points
Supercar GT3
1	(Australia) Daniel Bilski (Thailand) Sathaporn Veerachure	(Thailand) B-Quik Absolute Racing	1	1	Ret	Ret	1	1	1	1		150
2	(Australia) Ben Schoots (Australia) Shane Woodman	(Australia) Black Wolf Motorsport	2	2	1	1						86
Supercar GTM
1	(Hong Kong) Simon Chan Sye Wai (China) Alex Li Jia	(Malaysia) Fire Monkey X Silver Rocket	1	1	1	1						100
—	(Thailand) Sontaya Kunplome	(Thailand) Krm. Kon Rak Mia	WD	WD	Ret	DNS	DNS	DNS				0
Supercar GT4
1	(Thailand) Prakhun Phornprapha	(Thailand) Inging x Autowerks Racing	1	2	Ret	DNS	1	1	1	1		143
2	(Thailand) Suttipong Smittachartch (Thailand) Grant Supaphongs	Toyota Gazoo Racing Thailand	2	3	1	2	3	3	3	3		136
3	(Australia) Todd Kingsford	(Thailand) Inging x Autowerks Racing			Ret	1	1	1	1	1		125
4	(Thailand) Thanakorn Liewphairatana (Thailand) Prachpok LuesaKulkitpaisal	(Thailand) Inging x Autowerks Racing					2	2	2	2		72
5	(Thailand) Andrew Adulayavichitr	(Thailand) Inging x Autowerks Racing	1	2								43
6	(Thailand) Voraput Phornprapha	(Thailand) Inging x Autowerks Racing	Ret	1	WD	WD						25
7	(Thailand) Warren Adulayavichitr	(Thailand) Inging x Autowerks Racing	Ret	1								25
—	(Thailand) Thanaroj Tanasitnitikate	(Thailand) Inging x Autowerks Racing			WD	WD	WD	WD				0
Pos.	Driver	Team	BUR (Thailand)		BAN (Thailand)		SEP (Malaysia)		BUR (Thailand)		BUR (Thailand)	Points

==== Porsche Sprint Trophy Thailand ====
Pos.	Driver	Team	BUR (Thailand)		BAN (Thailand)		SEP (Malaysia)		BUR (Thailand)		BUR (Thailand)	Points
Supercar GT3
1	(Netherlands) Henk Kiks	(Thailand) B-Quik Absolute Racing	1	1	1	1	Ret	1	1	1		175
2	(France) Alessandro Ghiretti	(Thailand) B-Quik Absolute Racing	1	1	1	1	Ret	1				125
Supercar GTM
1	(China) Alex Li Jia	(Thailand) Fire Monkey X Silver Rocket	1	1	1	1			1	1		150
2	(Hong Kong) Simon Chan Sye Wai	(Thailand) Fire Monkey X Silver Rocket	1	1	1	1						100
3	(Malaysia) Naquib Azlan	(Malaysia) Fire Monkey X Silver Rocket							1	1		50
—	(Thailand) Sontaya Kunplome	(Thailand) Krm. Kon Rak Mia	WD	WD	Ret	DNS	DNS	DNS				0
Supercar GT4
1	(Thailand) Kantadhee Kusiri (Thailand) Dechathorn Phuakkarawut	(Thailand) AAS Motorsport	2	1	1	1	1	1	1	1		193
2	(Thailand) Kmik Karnasuta (Thailand) Thanapattra Sutthisawang	(Thailand) AAS Motorsport	1	2	2	2	3	2	2	2		130
3	(Finland) Elias Seppänen (China) Xu Xin	(Malaysia) R Engineering					2	3				33
Pos.	Driver	Team	BUR (Thailand)		BAN (Thailand)		SEP (Malaysia)		BUR (Thailand)		BUR (Thailand)	Points

=== Teams' championships ===
Pos.	Team	BUR (Thailand)		BAN (Thailand)		SEP (Malaysia)		BUR (Thailand)		BUR (Thailand)	Points
Supercar GT3
1	Singha Motorsport Team Thailand	1	4	1	1	1	1	1	2		262
1	Singha Motorsport Team Thailand	4	5	3	Ret	4	2	3	Ret		262
2	(Thailand) B-Quik Absolute Racing	2	1	2	2	3	3	2	1		239
2	(Thailand) B-Quik Absolute Racing	3	2	Ret	3	Ret	4	4	3		239
3	(Australia) Black Wolf Motorsport	6	3	4	4						47
4	(New Zealand) Team NZ Motorsport					2	5				28
Supercar GTM
1	(Thailand) PSC Motorsport	1	1	1	1	1	1	2	1		193
1	(Thailand) PSC Motorsport	WD	WD	WD	WD						193
2	(Thailand) Fire Monkey X Silver Rocket	3	2	3	3			1	2		106
3	(New Zealand) CRE Racing	2	3	2	2	WD	WD	Ret	Ret		69
—	(Thailand) Krm. Kon Rak Mia	WD	WD	Ret	DNS	DNS	DNS				0
Supercar GT4
1	(Thailand) AAS Motorsport	5	1	1	2	3	2	4	1		226
1	(Thailand) AAS Motorsport	6	3	4	3	8	7	5	6		226
2	(Thailand) Inging x Autowerks Racing	1	6	Ret	4	1	1	3	2		170
2	(Thailand) Inging x Autowerks Racing	Ret	7	WD	WD	9	6	7	5		170
3	(Malaysia) Petrolife Racing Team	4	2	3	1	7	3	2	3		124
4	Toyota Gazoo Racing Thailand	3	4	6	6	5	4	6	4		107
4	Toyota Gazoo Racing Thailand	8	8	WD	WD	11	8	8	7		107
5	(Malaysia) Wing Hin Motorsports	2	5	2	Ret	2	5	1	Ret		99
6	(Macau) Elegant Racing Team			5	5	10	9				23
7	Toyota Gazoo Racing Indonesia					4	Ret	WD	WD		12
8	(Malaysia) R Engineering					6	10				9
9	(Thailand) N-Sports, Acre, Singha Team Vattana	7	9								8
Supercar GTC
1	Toyota Gazoo Racing Thailand	1	1	1	1			1	1		237
1	Toyota Gazoo Racing Thailand	2	Ret	2	2			2	3		237
3	(Thailand) Turtle Monster Racing			Ret	Ret			4	2		30
4	(Thailand) B-Quik Absolute Racing							3	4		27
—	(Thailand) Speed Factory / ETS	DNS	Ret								0
Pos.	Team	BUR (Thailand)		BAN (Thailand)		SEP (Malaysia)		BUR (Thailand)		BUR (Thailand)	Points

== See also ==
- 2026 GT World Challenge Asia
- 2026 SRO Japan Cup
