= 2026 Porsche Carrera Cup Asia =

Motorsport racing season

The 2026 Porsche Carrera Cup Asia was the twenty-third season of the Porsche Carrera Cup Asia. The season commenced on 14 March at the Shanghai International Circuit, and finished at Marina Bay Street Circuit on 11 October.

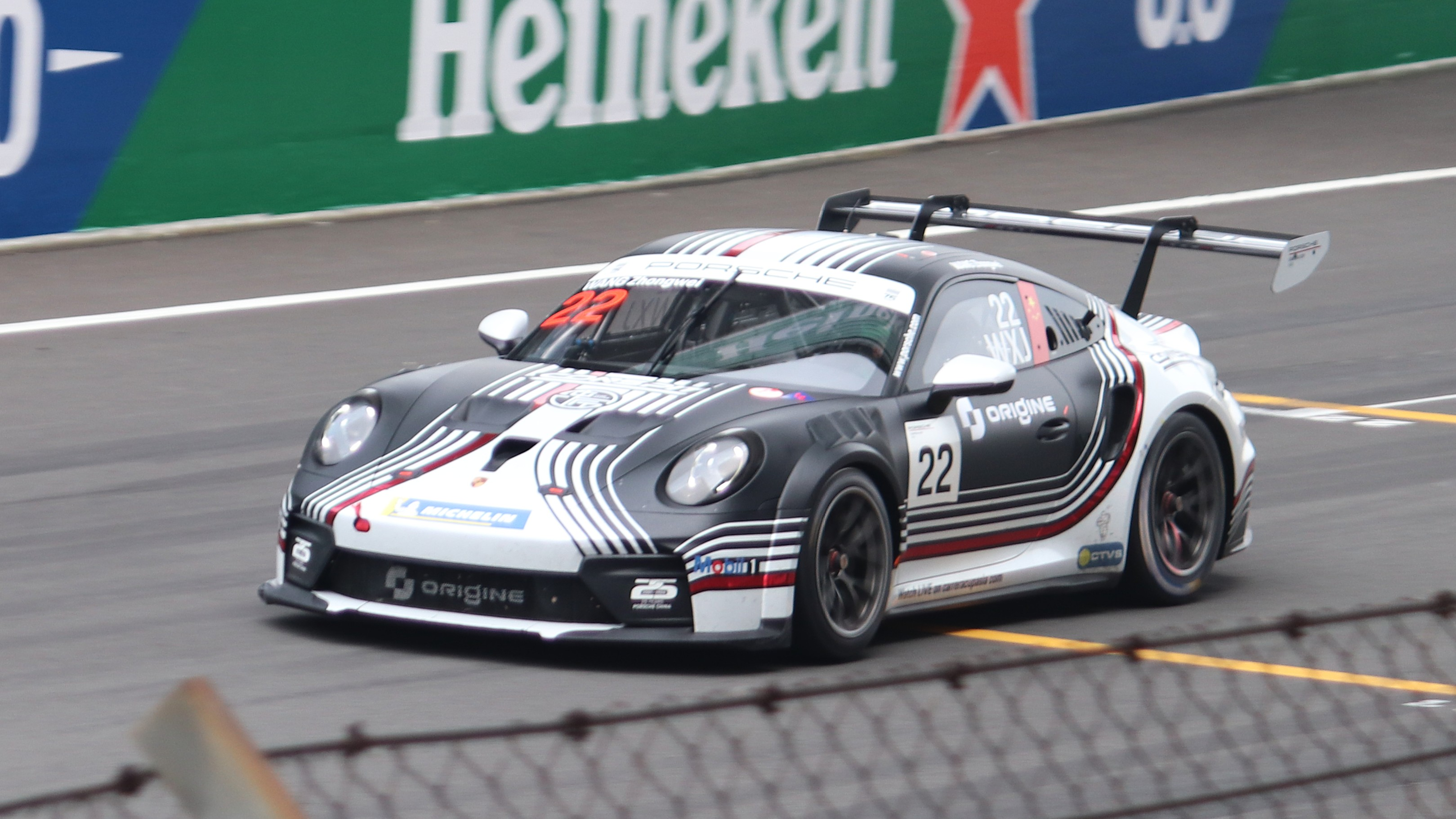
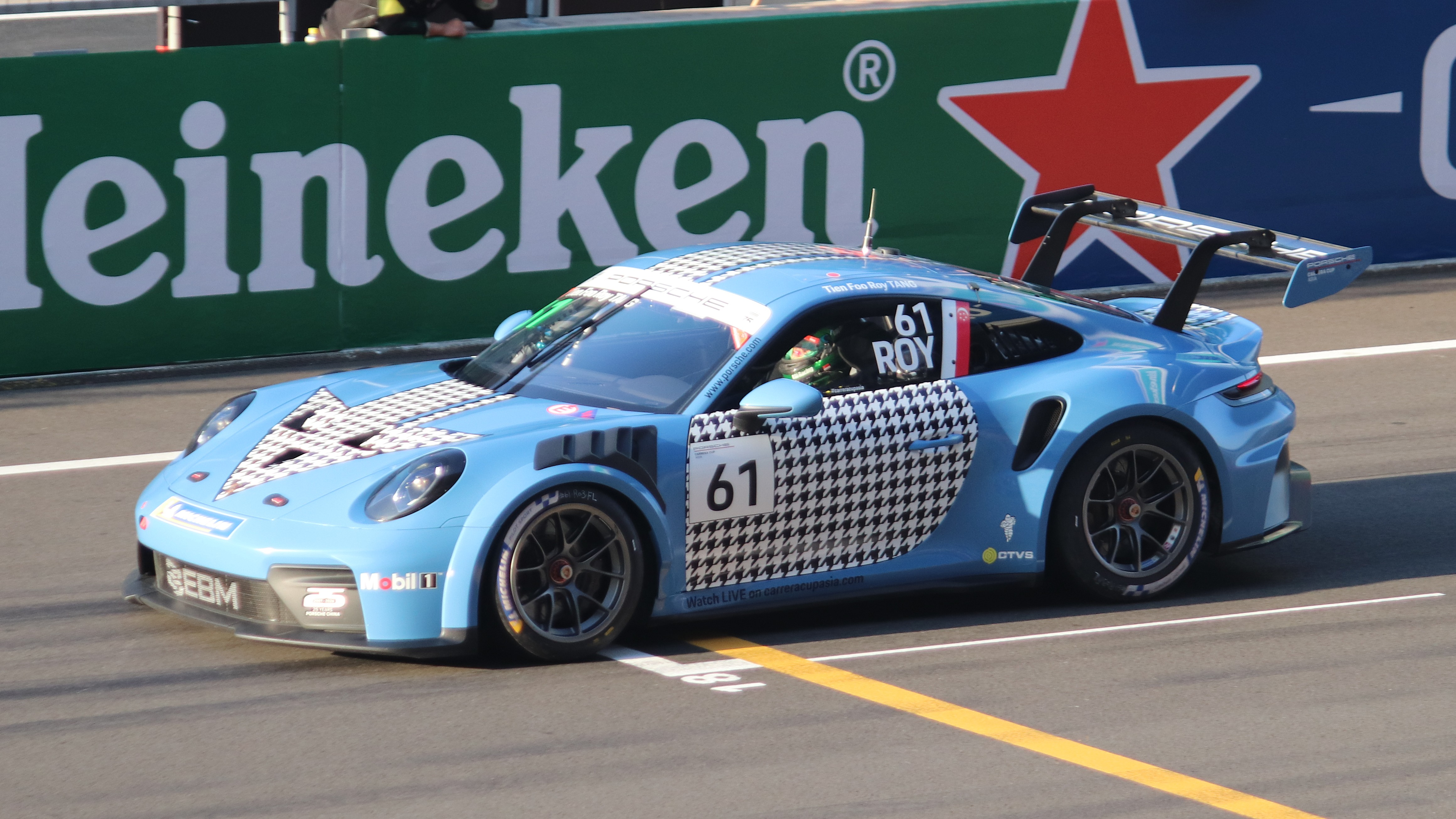
Marco Giltrap won the overall Drivers' Championship, while BWT Shanghai Yonda won the Dealer's Trophy standings. Wang Zhongwei won the Pro-Am Drivers' Championship, with Roy Tang winning the Am Drivers' Championship.

== Entry list ==
Team	No.	Driver	Class	Rounds
(China) / BWT Shanghai Yonda (Note: Car No. 3 entered as BWT Shanghai Yonda, No. 8 entered as Team Wetrade x Phantom Global, No. 27 entered as BWT x Phantom Global, No. 77 & 79 entered as Phantom Global Racing); (China) / BWT x Phantom Global; (China) / Phantom Global Racing; (China) / Team Wetrade x Phantom Global	3	(Finland) Marcus Amand	P	1–4, 6
(China) / BWT Shanghai Yonda; (China) / BWT x Phantom Global; (China) / Phantom Global Racing; (China) / Team Wetrade x Phantom Global	3	(France) Macéo Capietto	P	5
(China) / BWT Shanghai Yonda; (China) / BWT x Phantom Global; (China) / Phantom Global Racing; (China) / Team Wetrade x Phantom Global	8	(Mozambique) Rodrigo Dias Almeida	P	All
(China) / BWT Shanghai Yonda; (China) / BWT x Phantom Global; (China) / Phantom Global Racing; (China) / Team Wetrade x Phantom Global	27	(China) Yan Chuang	Am	All
(China) / BWT Shanghai Yonda; (China) / BWT x Phantom Global; (China) / Phantom Global Racing; (China) / Team Wetrade x Phantom Global	77	(China) Liu Ruiqi	P	All
(China) / BWT Shanghai Yonda; (China) / BWT x Phantom Global; (China) / Phantom Global Racing; (China) / Team Wetrade x Phantom Global	79	(Philippines) Li Ning (Note: Ning is a Chinese driver competing under a Filipino license.)	Am	1–3
(China) / BWT Shanghai Yonda; (China) / BWT x Phantom Global; (China) / Phantom Global Racing; (China) / Team Wetrade x Phantom Global	79	(China) Chris Chia On	PA	4–6
(China) Origine Motorsport	4	(China) Lu Wei	PA	1–3
(China) Origine Motorsport	4	(United States) Kerong Li (Note: Kerong Li is a Chinese driver competed under the American license.)	PA	4
(China) Origine Motorsport	4	(China) Gu Meng	Am	5
(China) Origine Motorsport	4	(China) Tang Ruobin	PA	6
(China) Origine Motorsport	7	(China) Bao Jinlong	PA	1–3, 5
(China) Origine Motorsport	22	(China) Wang Zhongwei	PA	All
(China) Origine Motorsport	33	(China) Wu Jiaxin	Am	1, 3
(China) Origine Motorsport	33	(China) Jiang Jiawei	Am	2
(China) Origine Motorsport	33	(Malaysia) Nazim Azman	P	5
(China) Origine Motorsport	33	(Australia) Adrian Flack	PA	6
(China) Origine Motorsport	87	(China) Ling Kang	P	All
(Malaysia) Fire Monkey Motorsport (Note: Car No. 10 entered as Fire Monkey Motorsport, No. 11 & 61 entered as EBM, No. 17 entered as Team Porsche Malaysia, No. 65 entered as Viper Niza Racing, No. 66 entered as Team Porsche New Zealand) (New Zealand) EBM Team Porsche Malaysia (Malaysia) Viper Niza Racing Team Porsche New Zealand	10	(Hong Kong) Simon Chan	Am	All
(Malaysia) Fire Monkey Motorsport (New Zealand) EBM Team Porsche Malaysia (Malaysia) Viper Niza Racing Team Porsche New Zealand	11	(Singapore) Joshua Berry (Note: Joshua Berry is an Australian driver competing under a Singaporean license.)	P	All
(Malaysia) Fire Monkey Motorsport (New Zealand) EBM Team Porsche Malaysia (Malaysia) Viper Niza Racing Team Porsche New Zealand	17	(Malaysia) Naquib Azlan	P	All
(Malaysia) Fire Monkey Motorsport (New Zealand) EBM Team Porsche Malaysia (Malaysia) Viper Niza Racing Team Porsche New Zealand	61	(Singapore) Roy Tang	Am	1
(Malaysia) Fire Monkey Motorsport (New Zealand) EBM Team Porsche Malaysia (Malaysia) Viper Niza Racing Team Porsche New Zealand	61	(Malaysia) Adrian D'Silva	M	2–6
(Malaysia) Fire Monkey Motorsport (New Zealand) EBM Team Porsche Malaysia (Malaysia) Viper Niza Racing Team Porsche New Zealand	65	(Malaysia) Douglas Khoo	M	1–3, 5–6
(Malaysia) Fire Monkey Motorsport (New Zealand) EBM Team Porsche Malaysia (Malaysia) Viper Niza Racing Team Porsche New Zealand	65	(Australia) Dale Wood	P	4
(Malaysia) Fire Monkey Motorsport (New Zealand) EBM Team Porsche Malaysia (Malaysia) Viper Niza Racing Team Porsche New Zealand	66	(New Zealand) Marco Giltrap	P	All
(Hong Kong) Bergwerk (Note: Car No. 12 entered as Porsche Vietnam,No. 23, No. 91 entered as Bergwerk, No. 24 entered as Porsche Center Adelaide) (Australia) Porsche Centre Adelaide Porsche Vietnam	12	(Vietnam) Sawer Hoàng Đạt	P	All
(Hong Kong) Bergwerk (Australia) Porsche Centre Adelaide Porsche Vietnam	23	(Hong Kong) Eric Kwong	Am	1–3, 5–6
(Hong Kong) Bergwerk (Australia) Porsche Centre Adelaide Porsche Vietnam	23	(New Zealand) Chris van der Drift	P	4
(Hong Kong) Bergwerk (Australia) Porsche Centre Adelaide Porsche Vietnam	24	(Australia) Seth Gilmore	P	All
(Hong Kong) Bergwerk (Australia) Porsche Centre Adelaide Porsche Vietnam	91	(Hong Kong) Henry Kwong	Am	All
(Hong Kong) / Modena Motorsports (Note: Car No. 16 entered as Modena Motorsports, car No. 21 & 69 entered as OpenRoad Racing); (Hong Kong) / OpenRoad Racing	16	(Hong Kong) John Shen	M	All
(Hong Kong) / Modena Motorsports; (Hong Kong) / OpenRoad Racing	21	(Hong Kong) Francis Tjia	PA	1, 5–6
(Hong Kong) / Modena Motorsports; (Hong Kong) / OpenRoad Racing	21	(China) Lu Zhiwei	Am	2
(Hong Kong) / Modena Motorsports; (Hong Kong) / OpenRoad Racing	21	(United States) Kerong Li	PA	3
(Hong Kong) / Modena Motorsports; (Hong Kong) / OpenRoad Racing	69	(Hong Kong) Dominic Chia	Am	1–2
(Hong Kong) / Modena Motorsports; (Hong Kong) / OpenRoad Racing	69	(Canada) Christian Chia	M	3, 5–6
(Hong Kong) / Modena Motorsports; (Hong Kong) / OpenRoad Racing	69	(China) Xu Zhenfeng	Am	4
(China) 610 Racing	25	(China) Luo Kailuo	P	1
(China) 610 Racing	25	(Singapore) Roy Tang	Am	2–6
(China) 610 Racing	99	(China) Liu Chao	Am	1–3, 6
(China) 610 Racing	99	(China) Li Jia	Am	5
(China) 610 Racing	610	(China) Cao Qikuan	Am	1–2, 5–6
(China) 610 Racing	610	(China) Li Hanyu	PA	3
(China) 610 Racing	610	(China) Yang Haoje	Am	4
(China) Team Jebsen	55	(United Arab Emirates) Amna Al Qubaisi	P	All
(Hong Kong) / Absolute Racing (Note: Car No. 88 & 89 entered as Absolute Racing, car No. 911 entered as Team Carrera Cup Asia by Tempo. For round 6, car No. 88 entered as Tempo by Absolute Racing.); (Hong Kong) / Tempo by Absolute Racing; (Hong Kong) / Team Carrera Cup Asia by Tempo	88	(France) Marvin Klein	P	1, 3–4
(Hong Kong) / Absolute Racing; (Hong Kong) / Tempo by Absolute Racing; (Hong Kong) / Team Carrera Cup Asia by Tempo	88	(Germany) Alexander Tauscher	P	2
(Hong Kong) / Absolute Racing; (Hong Kong) / Tempo by Absolute Racing; (Hong Kong) / Team Carrera Cup Asia by Tempo	88	(Netherlands) Jaap van Lagen	P	6
(Hong Kong) / Absolute Racing; (Hong Kong) / Tempo by Absolute Racing; (Hong Kong) / Team Carrera Cup Asia by Tempo	88	(Luxembourg) Dylan Pereira	P	5
(Hong Kong) / Absolute Racing; (Hong Kong) / Tempo by Absolute Racing; (Hong Kong) / Team Carrera Cup Asia by Tempo	89	(Luxembourg) Dylan Pereira	P	4
(Hong Kong) / Absolute Racing; (Hong Kong) / Tempo by Absolute Racing; (Hong Kong) / Team Carrera Cup Asia by Tempo	89	(Germany) Montego Maassen	P	1–2
(Hong Kong) / Absolute Racing; (Hong Kong) / Tempo by Absolute Racing; (Hong Kong) / Team Carrera Cup Asia by Tempo	89	(Indonesia) "Andy Tan"	Am	3, 5
(Hong Kong) / Absolute Racing; (Hong Kong) / Tempo by Absolute Racing; (Hong Kong) / Team Carrera Cup Asia by Tempo	89	(Indonesia) "Andy Tan"	PA	6
(Hong Kong) / Absolute Racing; (Hong Kong) / Tempo by Absolute Racing; (Hong Kong) / Team Carrera Cup Asia by Tempo	89	(Malaysia) Aaron Lim Say Joon	Am	5
(Hong Kong) / Absolute Racing; (Hong Kong) / Tempo by Absolute Racing; (Hong Kong) / Team Carrera Cup Asia by Tempo	911	(France) Alessandro Ghiretti	P	6
(China) Porsche Own Retail 69 Team	969	(China) Jacky Wu	M	All

Icon	Class
P	Pro Cup
PA	Pro-Am Cup
Am	Am Cup
M	Masters Cup
	Guest Starter

== Calendar ==
Round		Circuit	Date	Supporting	Location
1	R1	(China) Shanghai International Circuit, Jiading District	14–15 March	Formula One World Championship; F1 Academy; SRO GT Cup	2026 Porsche Carrera Cup Asia is located in Asia
1	R2	(China) Shanghai International Circuit, Jiading District	14–15 March	Formula One World Championship; F1 Academy; SRO GT Cup	2026 Porsche Carrera Cup Asia is located in Asia
2	R3	(China) Zhuhai International Circuit, Xiangzhou District, Zhuhai	11–12 April	Stand-alone race	2026 Porsche Carrera Cup Asia is located in Asia
2	R4	(China) Zhuhai International Circuit, Xiangzhou District, Zhuhai	11–12 April	Stand-alone race	2026 Porsche Carrera Cup Asia is located in Asia
3	R5	(Japan) Fuji Speedway, Oyama, Shizuoka Prefecture	9–10 May	Kyojo Cup; Fuji Champion Race Series; Inter Proto Series	2026 Porsche Carrera Cup Asia is located in Asia
3	R6	(Japan) Fuji Speedway, Oyama, Shizuoka Prefecture	9–10 May	Kyojo Cup; Fuji Champion Race Series; Inter Proto Series	2026 Porsche Carrera Cup Asia is located in Asia
4	R7	(Thailand) Bangsaen Street Circuit, Chonburi	4–5 July	Thailand Super Series; TSS The Super Series; Eighty-Six Challenge Thailand	2026 Porsche Carrera Cup Asia is located in Asia
4	R8	(Thailand) Bangsaen Street Circuit, Chonburi	4–5 July	Thailand Super Series; TSS The Super Series; Eighty-Six Challenge Thailand	2026 Porsche Carrera Cup Asia is located in Asia
5	R9	(Malaysia) Sepang International Circuit, Sepang	22–23 August	Thailand Super Series; TSS The Super Series; Malaysia Touring Car Championship; Eighty-Six Challenge Thailand; GR86 Cup Malaysia Series	2026 Porsche Carrera Cup Asia is located in Asia
5	R10	(Malaysia) Sepang International Circuit, Sepang	22–23 August	Thailand Super Series; TSS The Super Series; Malaysia Touring Car Championship; Eighty-Six Challenge Thailand; GR86 Cup Malaysia Series	2026 Porsche Carrera Cup Asia is located in Asia
5	R11	(Malaysia) Sepang International Circuit, Sepang	22–23 August	Thailand Super Series; TSS The Super Series; Malaysia Touring Car Championship; Eighty-Six Challenge Thailand; GR86 Cup Malaysia Series	2026 Porsche Carrera Cup Asia is located in Asia
6	R12	Marina Bay Street Circuit, Singapore	10–11 October	Formula One World Championship	2026 Porsche Carrera Cup Asia is located in Asia
6	R13	Marina Bay Street Circuit, Singapore	10–11 October	Formula One World Championship	2026 Porsche Carrera Cup Asia is located in Asia

== Race results ==
Round		Circuit	Pole position	Overall winner	Pro-Am Winner	Am Winner	Masters Winner
1	R1	(China) Shanghai	(Malaysia) Naquib Azlan	(Malaysia) Naquib Azlan	(China) Lu Wei	(Singapore) Roy Tang	(China) Jacky Wu
1	R2	(China) Shanghai	(Malaysia) Naquib Azlan	(China) Luo Kailuo	(China) Wang Zhongwei	(China) Cao Qikuan	(Hong Kong) John Shen
2	R3	(China) Zhuhai	(Malaysia) Naquib Azlan	(Finland) Marcus Amand	(China) Wang Zhongwei	(Singapore) Roy Tang	(China) Jacky Wu
2	R4	(China) Zhuhai	(Malaysia) Naquib Azlan	(Germany) Alexander Tauscher	(China) Lu Wei	(Singapore) Roy Tang	(Hong Kong) John Shen
3	R5	(Japan) Fuji	(France) Marvin Klein	(Finland) Marcus Amand	(United States) Kerong Li	(China) Wu Jiaxin	(Canada) Christian Chia
3	R6	(Japan) Fuji	(Malaysia) Naquib Azlan	(Finland) Marcus Amand	(China) Wang Zhongwei	(Hong Kong) Eric Kwong	(Malaysia) Adrian D'Silva
4	R7	(Thailand) Bangsaen	(Malaysia) Naquib Azlan	(Finland) Marcus Amand	(China) Chris Chia On	(China) Xu Zhenfeng	(Hong Kong) John Shen
4	R8	(Thailand) Bangsaen	(Finland) Marcus Amand	(Finland) Marcus Amand	(China) Chris Chia On	(China) Xu Zhenfeng	(Hong Kong) John Shen
5	R9	(Malaysia) Sepang	(New Zealand) Marco Giltrap	(New Zealand) Marco Giltrap	(China) Bao Jinlong	(Singapore) Roy Tang	(Canada) Christian Chia
5	R10	(Malaysia) Sepang	(New Zealand) Marco Giltrap	(Luxembourg) Dylan Pereira	(China) Bao Jinlong	(China) Cao Qikuan	(Malaysia) Adrian D'Silva
5	R11	(Malaysia) Sepang	(New Zealand) Marco Giltrap	(New Zealand) Marco Giltrap	(China) Bao Jinlong	(China) Cao Qikuan	(Malaysia) Adrian D'Silva
6	R12	(Singapore) Marina Bay	(New Zealand) Marco Giltrap	(New Zealand) Marco Giltrap	(China) Bao Jinlong	(Hong Kong) Eric Kwong	(Hong Kong) John Shen
6	R13	(Singapore) Marina Bay	(New Zealand) Marco Giltrap	(New Zealand) Marco Giltrap	(China) Bao Jinlong	(Hong Kong) Eric Kwong	(Canada) Christian Chia

== Championship standings ==
=== Scoring system ===
Points were awarded to the top fifteen classified drivers in every race, using the following system:

Position	1st	2nd	3rd	4th	5th	6th	7th	8th	9th	10th	11th	12th	13th	14th	15th	Pole (R1)	FL
Points	25	20	17	14	12	10	9	8	7	6	5	4	3	2	1	1	1

=== Overall ===
Pos	Driver	Team	SHA (China)		ZHU (China)		FUJ (Japan)		BAN (Thailand)		SEP (Malaysia)			MRN (Singapore)		Pts
Pos	Driver	Team	R1 (Note: The race was not resumed following a red flag on lap 1 after multiple incidents at the start. Qualifying results were used for the final classification, and half points were awarded.)	R2	R3	R4	R5	R6	R7	R8	R9	R10	R11	R12	R13	Pts
1	(New Zealand) Marco Giltrap	Team Porsche New Zealand	8	4	2	Ret	3	5	4	2	1	3	1	1	1	236.5
2	(Finland) Marcus Amand	(Hong Kong) BWT Shanghai Yonda	2	3	1	3	1	1	1	1				3	2	219
3	(Mozambique) Rodrigo Dias Almeida	(Hong Kong) Team Wetrade x Phantom Global	3	8	3	2	4	4	DNS	14	4	2	9	4	Ret	163.5
4	(China) Liu Ruiqi	(Hong Kong) Phantom Global Racing	9	9	8	24	7	7	6	4	6	6	6	5	26	123
5	(Malaysia) Naquib Azlan	Team Porsche Malaysia	1	DNS	4	13	Ret	2	5	Ret	2	7	5	Ret	27	121.5
6	(China) Ling Kang	(China) Origine Motorsport	6	2	5	25	5	6	8	Ret	8	5	8	10	Ret	121
7	(Vietnam) Sawer Hoàng Đạt	Porsche Vietnam	10	5	22	5	6	11	WD	WD	9	8	7	18	13	91.5
8	(Australia) Seth Gilmore	(Australia) Porsche Centre Adelaide	15	13	9	20	10	14	7	Ret	12	13	13	7	7	78.5
9	(France) Marvin Klein	(Hong Kong) Absolute Racing	4	7			2	3	3	Ret						78
10	(Singapore) Joshua Berry	(New Zealand) EBM	17	18	12	Ret	8	8	20	5	11	9	11	6	19	77.5
11	(China) Bao Jinlong	(China) Origine Motorsport	12	15	13	23	DSQ	DSQ			10	11	10	8	5	64.5
12	(United Arab Emirates) Amna Al Qubaisi	(China) Team Jebsen	22	14	14	9	9	10	10	9	23	12	16	16	22	60
13	(Singapore) Roy Tang	(New Zealand) EBM	14	12												53
13	(Singapore) Roy Tang	(China) 610 Racing			15	7	13	23	15	12	14	20	19	17	11	53
14	(China) Chris Chia On	(China) Phantom Global Racing							9	6	13	15	14	13	9	52
15	(China) Wang Zhongwei	(China) Origine Motorsport	13	10	10	8	DSQ	9	19	Ret	27	23	15	28	25	42
16	(Hong Kong) Eric Kwong	(Hong Kong) Bergwerk	18	19	16	10	15	13			16	17	18	12	8	40
17	(Hong Kong) Henry Kwong	(Hong Kong) Bergwerk	18	16	26	Ret	14	16	13	11	17	16	17	15	12	37
18	(China) Cao Qikuan	(China) 610 Racing	16	11	11	19					19	14	12	24	10	33
19	(China) Yan Chuang	(Hong Kong) BWT x Phantom Global	21	17	18	16	16	18	Ret	8	18	18	21	13	14	28
20	(China) Lu Wei	(China) Origine Motorsport	7	Ret	Ret	6	DNS	Ret								19
21	(Hong Kong) Simon Chan	(Malaysia) Fire Monkey Motorsport	27	21	21	14	20	22	12	10	20	25	27	Ret	Ret	18
22	(Hong Kong) John Shen	(Hong Kong) Modena Motorsport	28	20	19	11	19	Ret	16	17	22	22	24	20	17	17
23	(Malaysia) Adrian D'Silva	(New Zealand) EBM			20	12	22	19	18	15	24	19	20	25	20	10
24	(Hong Kong) Francis Tjia	(Hong Kong) OpenRoad Racing	24	DNS							15	24	22	14	18	10
25	(China) Jacky Wu	(China) Porsche Own Retail 69 Team	25	23	17	Ret	21	25	Ret	18	25	26	23	21	16	8
26	(China) Wu Jiaxin	(China) Origine Motorsport	20	27			12	17								6
27	(Philippines) Li Ning	(China) Phantom Global Racing	23	24	Ret	17	24	21								2
28	(China) Liu Chao	(China) 610 Racing	26	22	Ret	18	17	Ret						26	21	1
29	(Indonesia) "Andy Tan"	(Hong Kong) Absolute Racing					Ret	24			WD	WD	WD	19	Ret	0
30	(Malaysia) Douglas Khoo	(Malaysia) Viper Niza Racing	29	25	24	21	23	26			26	28	28	27	23	0
31	(Hong Kong) Dominic Chia	(Hong Kong) OpenRoad Racing	30	26	25	22										0
Guest drivers ineligible to score points
—	(Luxembourg) Dylan Pereira	(Hong Kong) Absolute Racing							2	3	5	1	4			–
—	(China) Luo Kailuo	(China) 610 Racing	5	1												–
—	(Germany) Alexander Tauscher	(Hong Kong) Absolute Racing			6	1										–
—	(France) Macéo Capietto	(Hong Kong) BWT Shanghai Yongda									3	4	2			–
—	(France) Alessandro Ghiretti	(Hong Kong) Team Carrera Cup Asia by Tempo												2	4	–
—	(Malaysia) Nazim Azman	(China) Origine Motorsport									7	10	3			–
—	(Netherlands) Jaap van Lagen	(Hong Kong) Tempo by Absolute Racing												Ret	3	–
—	(Germany) Montego Maassen	(Hong Kong) Absolute Racing	11	6	7	4										–
—	(Australia) Adrian Flack	(China) Origine Motorsport												9	6	–
—	(China) Xu Zhenfeng	(Hong Kong) OpenRoad Racing							11	7						–
—	(United States) Kerong Li	(Hong Kong) OpenRoad Racing					11	15								–
—	(United States) Kerong Li	(China) Origine Motorsport							14	16						–
—	(China) Li Hanyu	(China) 610 Racing					Ret	12								–
—	(China) Yang Haoje	(China) 610 Racing							17	13						–
—	(Canada) Christian Chia	(Hong Kong) OpenRoad Racing					19	20			21	21	25	22	15	–
—	(China) Jiang Jiawei	(China) Origine Motorsport			23	15										–
—	(China) Tang Ruobin	(China) Origine Motorsport												23	24	–
—	(China) Li Jia	(China) 610 Racing									Ret	27	26			–
—	(China) Lu Zhiwei	(Hong Kong) OpenRoad Racing			Ret	Ret										–
—	(New Zealand) Chris van der Drift	(Hong Kong) Bergwerk							Ret	Ret						–
—	(Australia) Dale Wood	(Malaysia) Viper Niza Racing							Ret	Ret						–
—	(Malaysia) Aaron Lim Say Joon	(Hong Kong) Absolute Racing									Ret	Ret	Ret			–
—	(China) Gu Meng	(China) Origine Motorsport									WD	WD	WD			–
Pos	Driver	Team	SHA (China)		ZHU (China)		FUJ (Japan)		BAN (Thailand)		SEP (Malaysia)			MRN (Singapore)		Pts

=== Pro-Am ===
Pos	Driver	Team	SHA (China)		ZHU (China)		FUJ (Japan)		BAN (Thailand)		SEP (Malaysia)			MRN (Singapore)		Pts
Pos	Driver	Team	R1	R2	R3	R4	R5	R6	R7	R8	R9	R10	R11	R12	R13	Pts
1	(China) Wang Zhongwei	(China) Origine Motorsport	2	1	1	2	DSQ	1	3	Ret	4	3	3	7	6	204
2	(China) Bao Jinlong	(China) Origine Motorsport	3	2	2	3	DSQ	DSQ			1	1	1	1	1	195.5
3	(China) Chris Chia On	(China) Phantom Global Racing							1	1	2	2	2	3	3	155
4	(Hong Kong) Francis Tjia	(Hong Kong) OpenRoad Racing	4	DNS							3	4	4	4	4	86
5	(China) Lu Wei	(China) Origine Motorsport	1	Ret	Ret	1	DNS	Ret								41.5
Guest drivers ineligible to score points
—	(United States) Kerong Li	(Hong Kong) OpenRoad Racing					1	3								–
—	(United States) Kerong Li	(China) Origine Motorsport							2	2						–
—	(Australia) Adrian Flack	(China) Origine Motorsport												2	2	–
—	(China) Li Hanyu	(China) 610 Racing					Ret	2								–
—	(China) Tang Ruobin	(China) Origine Motorsport												6	5	–
—	(Indonesia) "Andy Tan"	(Hong Kong) Absolute Racing												5	Ret	–
Pos	Driver	Team	SHA (China)		ZHU (China)		FUJ (Japan)		BAN (Thailand)		SEP (Malaysia)			MRN (Singapore)		Pts

=== Am ===
Pos	Driver	Team	SHA (China)		ZHU (China)		FUJ (Japan)		BAN (Thailand)		SEP (Malaysia)			MRN (Singapore)		Pts
Pos	Driver	Team	R1	R2	R3	R4	R5	R6	R7	R8	R9	R10	R11	R12	R13	Pts
1	(Singapore) Roy Tang	(New Zealand) EBM	1	2												231.5
1	(Singapore) Roy Tang	(China) 610 Racing			1	1	2	7	4	5	1	5	4	4	3	231.5
2	(Hong Kong) Eric Kwong	(Hong Kong) Bergwerk	4	5	3	2	4	1			2	3	3	1	1	203
3	(Hong Kong) Henry Kwong	(Hong Kong) Bergwerk	3	3	7	Ret	3	2	3	4	3	2	2	3	4	197.5
4	(China) Yan Chuang	(Hong Kong) BWT x Phantom Global	6	4	4	5	5	4	Ret	2	4	4	5	2	5	168
5	(China) Cao Qikuan	(China) 610 Racing	2	1	2	8					5	1	1	5	2	167
6	(Hong Kong) Simon Chan	(Malaysia) Fire Monkey Motorsport	9	6	5	3	7	6	2	3	6	6	7	Ret	Ret	140
7	(China) Wu Jiaxin	(China) Origine Motorsport	5	10			1	3								54
8	(China) Liu Chao	(China) 610 Racing	8	7	Ret	7	6	Ret						6	6	52.5
9	(Philippines) Li Ning	(Hong Kong) Phantom Global Racing	7	8	Ret	6	Ret	5								46.5
10	(Hong Kong) Dominic Chia	(Hong Kong) OpenRoad Racing	10	9	7	9										28
11	(Indonesia) "Andy Tan"	(Hong Kong) Absolute Racing					Ret	8			WD	WD	WD			9
Guest drivers ineligible to score points
—	(China) Xu Zhenfeng	(Hong Kong) OpenRoad Racing							1	1						–
—	(China) Jiang Jiawei	(China) Origine Motorsport			6	4										–
—	(China) Yang Haoje	(China) 610 Racing							5	6						–
—	(China) Li Jia	(China) 610 Racing									Ret	7	6			–
—	(China) Lu Zhiwei	(Hong Kong) OpenRoad Racing			Ret	Ret										–
—	(Malaysia) Aaron Lim Say Joon	(Hong Kong) Absolute Racing									Ret	Ret	Ret			–
—	(China) Gu Meng	(China) Origine Motorsport									WD	WD	WD			–
Pos	Driver	Team	SHA (China)		ZHU (China)		FUJ (Japan)		BAN (Thailand)		SEP (Malaysia)			MRN (Singapore)		Pts

=== Masters ===
Pos	Driver	Team	SHA (China)		ZHU (China)		FUJ (Japan)		BAN (Thailand)		SEP (Malaysia)			MRN (Singapore)		Pts
Pos	Driver	Team	R1	R2	R3	R4	R5	R6	R7	R8	R9	R10	R11	R12	R13	Pts
1	(Hong Kong) John Shen	(Hong Kong) Modena Motorsport	2	1	2	1	2	Ret	1	1	2	3	3	1	3	255
2	(Malaysia) Adrian D'Silva	(New Zealand) EBM			3	2	4	1	2	2	3	1	1	4	4	232
3	(China) Jacky Wu	(China) Porsche Own Retail 69 Team	1	2	1	Ret	3	3	Ret	3	4	4	2	2	2	225.5
4	(Malaysia) Douglas Khoo	(Malaysia) Viper Niza Racing	3	3	4	3	5	4			5	5	5	5	5	157.5
Guest drivers ineligible to score points
—	(Canada) Christian Chia	(Hong Kong) OpenRoad Racing					1	2			1	2	4	3	1	–
Pos	Driver	Team	SHA (China)		ZHU (China)		FUJ (Japan)		BAN (Thailand)		SEP (Malaysia)			MRN (Singapore)		Pts

=== Dealer Trophy ===
Pos	Team	SHA (China)		ZHU (China)		FUJ (Japan)		BAN (Thailand)		SEP (Malaysia)			MRN (Singapore)		Pts
Pos	Team	R1	R2	R3	R4	R5	R6	R7	R8	R9	R10	R11	R12	R13	Pts
1	(China) BWT Shanghai Yonda	2	1	1	1	1	1	1	1	3	2	2	2	2	282
2	Team Porsche New Zealand	3	2	2	Ret	2	3	2	2	1	1	1	1	1	250.5
3	(China) Team Jebsen	6	5	5	3	4	4	5	3	6	5	6	4	6	159
4	Team Porsche Malaysia	1	DNS	3	4	Ret	2	3	Ret	2	3	3	Ret	7	152.5
5	Porsche Vietnam	4	3	7	2	3	5	WD	WD	4	4	4	5	4	150
6	(Australia) Porsche Centre Adelaide	5	4	4	5	5	6	4	Ret	5	6	5	3	3	150
7	(China) Porsche Own Retail 69 Team	7	6	6	Ret	6	7	Ret	4	7	7	7	6	5	102.5
Pos	Team	SHA (China)		ZHU (China)		FUJ (Japan)		BAN (Thailand)		SEP (Malaysia)			MRN (Singapore)		Pts

== See also ==
- 2026 Porsche Supercup
- 2026 Porsche Carrera Cup France
- 2026 Porsche Carrera Cup Germany
- 2026 Porsche Carrera Cup North America
- 2026 Porsche Carrera Cup Australia
- 2026 Porsche Carrera Cup Japan
