= Kenny Lee =

Malaysian racing driver (born 1978)

- Nationality: Malaysian
- Born: 30 July 1978 (age 48) Kuala Lumpur, Malaysia

TCR Asia Series career
- Debut season: 2015
- Current team: Wing Hin Motorsports
- Car number: 83
- Starts: 1

Previous series
- 2012: Malaysian Super Series Championship

Championship titles
- 2012: Malaysian Super Series Championship

Kenny Lee (born 30 July 1978) is a Malaysian racing driver currently competing in the TCR Asia Series. He had previously competed in the Malaysian Super Series Championship.

== Racing career ==
Lee began his career in 2010 in the Sepang 1000 km, he won the race that year and finished second in 2011. In 2010, he also raced in the Malaysia Merdeka Endurance Race, he also took part in 2011, 2012 and 2014. For 2012, Lee raced in the Malaysian Super Series Championship, he won the championship that year.

In September 2015, it was announced that Lee would race in the first ever TCR Asia Series round in Sepang, driving a SEAT León Cup Racer for Wing Hin Motorsports.

In December 2015, Lee won the inaugural Sepang 12 hours endurance race, driving for Wing Hin Motorsports in TOYOTA GT86 under Touring Production class. In the following year, December 2016, Kenny team up with 3 Japanese drivers to win Sepang 12 hours in collaboration of AMUSE SPV Racing with Wing Hin Motorsports with AMUSE SPV Racing built, TOYOTA GT86 Super Taikyu ST4 specification vehicle. In mid year of 2017, Kenny made his debut racing in Fuji Speedway, Japan, driving for team AMUSE SPV Racing in Super Taikyu series. The same year, Kenny won 2nd place in 2 races in Thailand, Bangsaen 200 by TOYOTA at Bangsaen Street Circuit and RAAT 6hours endurance at Buriram Circuit.

In 2018, Malaysian Championship Series round 2, Lee has showcase his dominance in wet race and finishing overall 2nd with 0.256 seconds behind upper class, Touring Production, while securing top podium spot in 1600cc Malaysian Touring Class. Lee also won race 2 in that weekend.

In May 2019, Lee started up a new business location, KEGANI RACING SERVICES, workshop with 7200 sq.ft. facilities to build, develop and maintain race cars for racer customers.
