= Jaylyn Robotham =

Australian racing driver

- Nationality: (Australia) Australian
- Born: 21 October 2002 (age 24) Victoria, Australia

Super 2 series career
- Current team: MW Motorsport
- Categorisation: FIA Silver
- Car number: 3
- Starts: 20
- Wins: 1
- Podiums: 1
- Poles: 0
- Fastest laps: 0
- Best finish: N/A in 2021

Jaylyn Robotham (born 21 October 2002) is an Australian racing driver set to compete in the 2025 Intercontinental GT Challenge with Volante Rosso Motorsport.

== Career ==
=== Karting ===
Robotham started racing karts at the age of 11 and at the age of 14 he moved up into the Hyundai Excel Racing Series.

=== Hyundai Excel Series ===
Robotham competed in his first race in a closed cockpit a week after his 14th birthday at Phillip island to become the youngest driver to compete in the series. In 2017, he won the South Australian State Championship. He placed second at the Excel Nationals, third in the Victorian CAMS State Championship, and held multiple lap records. In 2018, he placed second in the Victorian State Championship.

=== Toyota 86 Racing Series ===
In 2018, Robotham debuted in the Toyota 86 Racing Series placing second in his first race in the championship. He then went on and placed fifth in his debut season after not competing at Bathurst due to him being too young. In 2019, Robotham returned and finished sixth in the championship

=== TA2 Asia ===
Robotham partnered with Paul Manuell From NZ and they achieved five wins out of ten races. In that year, they won the Bang Saen Beach Grand Prix.

== Career results ==
Season	Series	Position	Team	Races	Wins	Podiums
2016	Victorian Hyundai Excel Series	25th		3	0	0
2017	South Australian Circuit Excel Championship	**1st**	Jay Robotham Racing	17	14	15
2017	Australian Circuit Excel Nationals	**2nd**	Pedders Heidelberg	3	1	2
2017	Queensland X3 Series Invitational	**2nd**		3	0	3
2017	Victorian Hyundai Excel Championship	**3rd**	Jay Robotham Racing	12	4	4
2018	Victorian Hyundai Excel Championship	**2nd**	Jay Robotham Racing	11	7	9
2018	Toyota 86 Racing Series	5th	Jay Robotham Racing	1	0	1
2019	TA2 Asia Series	**1st**	Tecpro Idemitsu Racing	10	5	7
2019	Toyota 86 Racing Series	6th	Jay Robotham Racing	14	0	0
2020	Toyota Finance 86 Championship	**1st**	Jay Robotham Racing	12	5	11
2020	Super3 Series	**1st**	MW Motorsport	4	4	4
2021	Super2 Series	12th	Image Racing	7	0	0
2022	Super2 Series	8th	Image Racing	7	0	0
2022	Supercars Championship	48th	Matthew Chahda Motorsport	1	0	0
2023	Australian Hyundai Excel Nationals	**3rd**	Jay Robotham Racing	4	0	3
2023	Supercars Championship	52nd	Matt Stone Racing	1	0	0
2024	GT World Challenge Asia Silver-AM	13th	Climax Racing	6	0	2
2024	Supercars Championship	39th	Brad Jones Racing	2	0	0
2025	Intercontinental GT Challenge	N/C	Volante Rosso Motorsport	1	0	0

Season still in progress*

=== Super3 Series results ===
(key) (Race results only)

Super3 Series results
Year	Team	No.	Car	1	2	3	4	Position	Points
2020	MW Motorsport	28	Ford FG Falcon	**SYM**; **R1**; 1	**SYM**; **R2**; 1	BAT; R3; 1	**BAT**; **R4**; 1	NC	-

=== Super2 Series results ===
(key) (Race results only)

Super2 Series results
Year	Team	No.	Car	1	2	3	4	5	6	7	8	9	10	11	12	Position	Points
2021	Image Racing	999	Holden VF Commodore	BAT; R1; 10	BAT; R2; 4	TOW1; R3	TOW1; R4	TOW2; R5; 9	TOW2; R6; 12	SMP; R7; 12	SMP; R8; C	BAT; R9; 10	BAT; R10; 12			12th	567
2022	Image Racing	999	Holden VF Commodore	SMP; R1; 1	SMP; R2; 6	WAN; R3; 14	WAN; R4; 5	TOW; R5; 15	TOW; R6; Ret	SAN; R7; 4	SAN; R8; 14	BAT; R9	BAT; R10	ADE; R11; 6	ADE; R12; 7	8th	867
2023	MW Motorsport	3	Ford Mustang S550	NEW; R1; 9	NEW; R2; 14	WAN; R3	WAN; R4	TOW; R5	TOW; R6	SAN; R7	SAN; R8	BAT; R9	BAT; R10	ADE; R11	ADE; R12	22nd	147

=== Supercars Championship results ===
(Races in bold indicate pole position) (Races in italics indicate fastest lap)

Supercars results
Year	Team	No.	Car	1	2	3	4	5	6	7	8	9	10	11	12	13	14	15	16	17	18	19	20	21	22	23	24	25	26	27	28	29	30	31	32	33	34	Position	Points
2022	Matt Chahda Motorsport	118	Chevrolet Camaro ZL1	SMP; R1	SMP; R2	SYM; R3	SYM; R4	SYM; R5	MEL; R6	MEL; R7	MEL; R8	MEL; R9	BAR; R10	BAR; R11	BAR; R12	WIN; R13	WIN; R14	WIN; R15	HID; R16	HID; R17	HID; R18	TOW; R19	TOW; R20	BEN; R21	BEN; R22	BEN; R23	SAN; R24	SAN; R25	SAN; R26	PUK; R27	PUK; R28	PUK; R29	BAT; R30; 7	SUR; R31	SUR; R32	NEW; R33	NEW; R34	49th	102
2023	Matt Stone Racing	35	Chevrolet Camaro ZL1	NEW; R1	NEW; R2	MEL; R3	MEL; R4	MEL; R5	MEL; R6	BAR; R7	BAR; R8	BAR; R9	SYM; R10	SYM; R11	SYM; R12	HID; R13	HID; R14	HID; R15	TOW; R16	TOW; R17	SMP; R18	SMP; R19	BEN; R20	BEN; R21	BEN; R22	SAN; R23; Ret	BAT; R24; 15	SUR; R25	SUR; R26	ADE; R27	ADE; R28							52nd	120
2024	Brad Jones Racing	14	Chevrolet Camaro ZL1	BAT1; R1	BAT1; R2	MEL; R3	MEL; R4	MEL; R5	MEL; R6	TAU; R7	TAU; R8	BAR; R9	BAR; R10	HID; R11	HID; R12	TOW; R13	TOW; R14	SMP; R15	SMP; R16	BEN; R17	BEN; R18	SAN; R19; 9	BAT; R20; 22	SUR; R21	SUR; R22	ADE; R23	ADE; R24											39th	246

=== Complete Bathurst 1000 results ===
Year	Team	Car	Co-driver	Position	Laps
2022	Matthew Chahda Motorsport	Holden Commodore ZB	(Australia) Matthew Chahda	18th	161
2023	Matt Stone Racing	Chevrolet Camaro Mk.6	(Australia) Cameron Hill	15th	161
2024	Brad Jones Racing	Chevrolet Camaro Mk.6	(Australia) Bryce Fullwood	22nd	160
