= Singha =

Thai beer brand

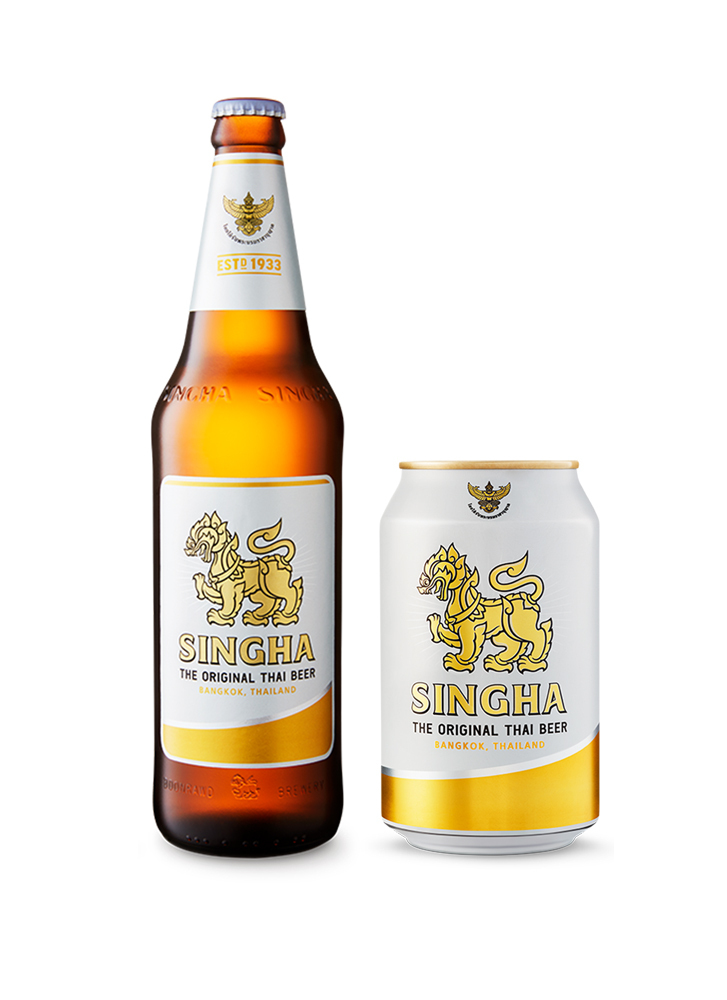
- Current Thai bottle
- Type: Beer
- Manufacturer: Boon Rawd Brewery
- Origin: Thailand
- Introduced: 1933
- Alcohol by volume: 5.0%
- Style: Lager
- Related products: LEO, U BEER, MY BEER, Snowy, Kopper Beer
- Website: www.singha.com

Singha (Thai: สิงห์; RTGS: Sing) is a pale lager beer manufactured in Thailand by the Singha Corporation Co. Ltd., a subsidiary of its parent company, Boon Rawd Brewery. Singha was first brewed in 1933, and in 1939 officially endorsed by King Rama VII by allowing the royal Garuda symbol on the bottle. It is available in over 50 countries worldwide in both standard (5% ABV) and light (3.8%) versions. Singha is brewed with 100% barley malt, three kinds of hops from Europe, and 100% artesian water. The brew is golden yellow in color, full-bodied, and rich in taste. It is packaged in bottles (330 ml and 620 ml), cans (330 ml and 490 ml), and on tap.

== Sponsorship ==
=== Football ===
Singha has sponsored Chelsea F.C. from 2010 to 2022.

In August 2015, Singha announced a three-year partnership with Leicester City F.C. as the club's official platinum partner and exclusive beer partner. The deal also includes Singha become the official sponsor of the Spion Kop Stand.

=== Motorsport ===
Singha became the official beer sponsor of the MotoGP World Championship in 2014.

Singha has been the sponsor of Finnish racing driver and 2007 Formula One World Champion Kimi Räikkönen since 2015. With Räikkönen's partnership, Singha has appeared on the car liveries of Scuderia Ferrari and Alfa Romeo F1 Team.

=== Snooker ===
Singha sponsors a number of Thai snooker players competing in the World Snooker Tour, including the women's world number one, Mink Nutcharut.

=== Theatre ===
In 2024 Singha began sponsoring PigPen Productions. The sponsorship began from partnering over PigPen's Deuteronomy at the Riverside Studio’s Bitesize Festival.
