= Bangsaen Street Circuit =

Motorsport circuit in Bang Saen, Thailand

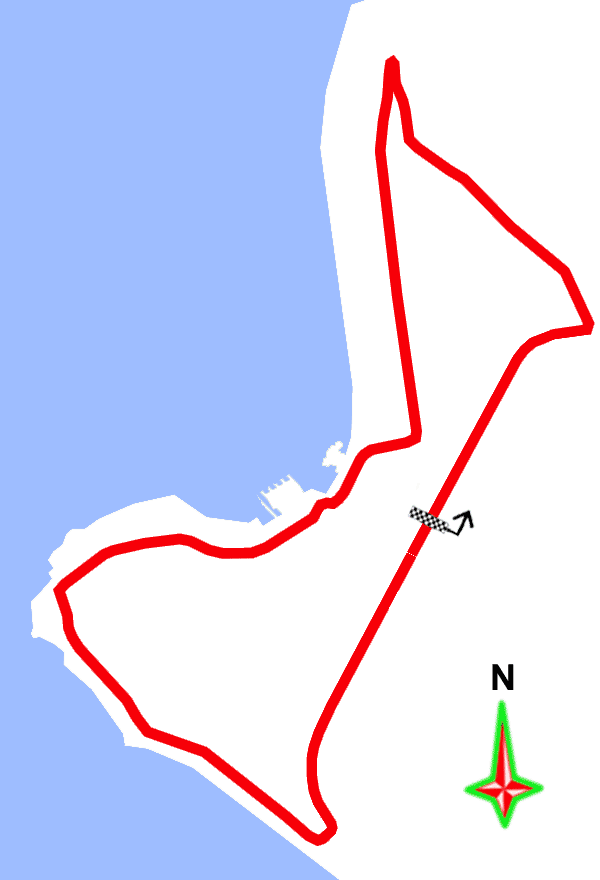
- Street Circuit (2007–present)
- Location: Bang Saen, Chonburi, Thailand
- Coordinates: 13°18′30″N 100°54′25″E
- FIA Grade: 3
- Opened: 2007
- Major events: Current: Porsche Carrera Cup Asia (2017–2019, 2024–present); Thailand Super Series (2015, 2017–2019, 2022–present); Former: F4 SEA (2025); TCR Asia (2017–2019)

Street Circuit (2007–present)
- Surface: Asphalt
- Length: 3.740 km (2.324 mi)
- Turns: 19
- Race lap record: 1:30.656 ( (Hong Kong) Lo Sze Ho, Honda Civic Type R TCR, 2018, TCR)

The Bangsaen Street Circuit is a 3.700 km (2.299 mi) motorsport circuit in Bang Saen, Chonburi, Thailand. The circuit was opened in 2007 and it hosts Speed Festival once a year. Before hosting international events in 2017, the circuit was redeveloped by Apex Circuit Design.

== Lap records ==
As of July 2025, the fastest official race lap records at the Bangsaen Street Circuit are listed as:

Category	Time	Driver	Vehicle	Event
Street Circuit (2007–present): 3.700 km (2.299 mi)
TCR Touring Car	1:30.656	Lo Sze Ho	Honda Civic Type R TCR (FK2)	2018 Bangsaen TCR Asia round
GT3	1:32.511	Laurin Heinrich	Porsche 911 (992 I) GT3 R	2025 Bangsaen Thailand Super Series Round
Porsche Carrera Cup	1:33.740	Dylan Pereira	Porsche 911 (992 II) GT3 Cup	2026 Bangsaen Porsche Carrera Cup Asia round
Formula 4	1:37.688	Alex Sawer	Tatuus F4-T421	2025 Bangsaen F4 SEA round
GT4	1:39.030	Siu Yin Wong	Toyota GR Supra GT4 Evo II	2026 Bangsaen Thailand Super Series Round
