= Wing Hin Motorsports =

(Malaysia) Wing Hin Motorsports
- Founded: 2001
- Team principal(s): Simon Loh
- Current series: TCR Asia Series; Malaysian Super Series
- Noted drivers: TCR Asia; 83. (Malaysia) Kenny Lee; Malaysian Super Series; 86. (Malaysia) Kenny Lee; 88. (Malaysia) Wong Yew Choong; 88. (Malaysia) William Ho
- Website: http://www.winghin.com/

Wing Hin Motorsports is a Malaysian auto racing team based in Kuala Lumpur, Malaysia. The team currently competes in the TCR Asia Series and the Malaysian Super Series.

== TCR Asia Series ==
=== SEAT León Cup Racer (2015–) ===
The team entered the 2015 TCR Asia Series season with Kenny Lee driving a SEAT León Cup Racer.
