= 2023 Porsche Carrera Cup Asia =

The 2023 Porsche Carrera Cup Asia was the twentieth season of the Porsche Carrera Cup Asia. The season commenced on 28 April at Sepang International Circuit and concluded on 22 October at the Shanghai International Circuit.

The overall championship was won by Porsche Supercup veteran Florian Latorre, with three-time series champion Chris van der Drift finishing as runner-up ahead of Luo Kailuo, who claimed five race victories over the course of the season. Chinese driver Bao Jinlong claimed his fourth championship in the Pro-Am class, with Yang Ruoyu becoming Am class champion.

== Calendar ==
Round	Circuit	Date	Supporting
1	(Malaysia) Sepang International Circuit, Sepang	28–30 April	Stand-alone event
2	(South Korea) Korea International Circuit, Yeongam	2–4 June	Asia Motorsports Carnival
3	(Japan) Suzuka International Racing Course, Suzuka	30 June–2 July	Suzuka Clubman Race
4	(Thailand) Buriram International Circuit, Buriram	4–6 August	Stand-alone event
5	(Malaysia) Sepang International Circuit, Sepang	25–27 August	Thailand Super Series
6	Marina Bay Street Circuit, Singapore	15–17 September	Formula One World Championship
7	(China) Shanghai International Circuit, Jiading District	20–22 October	Porsche Sprint Challenge China

== Entry list ==
Team	No.	Driver	Class	Rounds
(China) Porsche Beijing Central & Goldenport	2	(China) Zhou Bihuang	PA	All
(China) R&B Racing	5	(China) Wu Jiaxin	Am	All
(China) R&B Racing	25	(China) Zhu Zhiyao	Am	All
(China) Team Shanghai Yongda	8	(New Zealand) Chris van der Drift	P	All
(China) Team Betterlife	9	(China) Li Chao	PA	All
(China) Meidong Racing	11	(France) Florian Latorre	P	All
(Hong Kong) Modena Motorsports	16	(Canada) John Shen	Am	1–2, 4–7
(Hong Kong) Modena Motorsports	16	(China) Zhang Yaqi	Am	3
(Malaysia) Sime Darby Racing Team	17	(Malaysia) Nazim Azman	P	1–3, 5–7
(Malaysia) Sime Darby Racing Team	17	(New Zealand) Reid Harker	P	4
Trans-China Automotive Racing	21	(Netherlands) Francis Tjia	PA	1–2, 4–7
Trans-China Automotive Racing	21	(Hong Kong) Samson Chan	Am	3
(China) BD Group	22	(China) Yang Ruoyu	Am	All
(Hong Kong) Kiddy World Racing	23	(Hong Kong) Eric Kwong	Am	All
(Hong Kong) Team Jebsen	55	(China) Gao Yujia	P	All
(Malaysia) EBM Giga Racing	61	(Malaysia) Adrian D'Silva	Am	1, 3–4
(Malaysia) EBM Giga Racing	61	(New Zealand) Reid Harker	P	2
(Malaysia) EBM Giga Racing	61	(Malaysia) Aaron Foong	Am	5–6
(Malaysia) EBM Giga Racing	61	(United States) Kerong Li	Am	7
(China) Shanghai Pudong & Waigaoqiao 69 Racing	69	(Chinese Taipei) Jacky Wu	Am	All
(China) TORO Racing	77	(China) Eric Zang	PA	1–4, 6–7
(China) TORO Racing	77	(China) Li Sushang	Am	5
(China) TORO Racing	99	(China) Luo Kailuo	P	All
(China) Team C&D	83	(China) Hong Shijie	PA	1–2, 4–7
(Austria) Porsche Holding	86	(Austria) Martin Ragginger	P	All
(Canada) OpenRoad Racing	88	(Canada) Christian Chia	Am	1–6
(Canada) OpenRoad Racing	88	(Canada) Scott Hargrove	P	7
(China) Z.SPEED Motorsport	188	(China) Li Xuanyu	Am	All
(China) Zheng Tong Auto	718	(China) Bao Jinlong	PA	All

Icon	Class
P	Pro Cup
PA	Pro-Am Cup
Am	Am Cup

== Results ==
Round		Circuit	Pole position	Fastest lap	Overall winner	Winning team	Pro-Am Winner	Am Winner
1	R1	(Malaysia) Sepang International Circuit	(France) Florian Latorre	(France) Florian Latorre	(China) Luo Kailuo (Note: Florian Latorre was the first driver to cross the finish line, but received a 10 second time penalty for a start infringement. Luo Kailuo, who was the second driver to cross the finish line, thus inherited the win.)	(China) TORO Racing	(China) Li Chao	(China) Wu Jiaxin
1	R2	(Malaysia) Sepang International Circuit		(France) Florian Latorre	(China) Luo Kailuo	(China) TORO Racing	(China) Bao Jinlong	(China) Yang Ruoyu
2	R1	(South Korea) Korea International Circuit	(France) Florian Latorre	(France) Florian Latorre	(France) Florian Latorre	(China) Meidong Racing	(China) Bao Jinlong	(China) Li Xuanyu
2	R2	(South Korea) Korea International Circuit		(China) Luo Kailuo	(China) Luo Kailuo	(China) TORO Racing	(China) Eric Zang	(China) Yang Ruoyu
3	R1	(Japan) Suzuka International Racing Course	(France) Florian Latorre	(France) Florian Latorre	(France) Florian Latorre (Note: Martin Ragginger originally won the race, but later received a 30 second time penalty for overtaking under the safety car. Florian Latorre, initially classified second, thus inherited the win.)	(China) Meidong Racing	(China) Bao Jinlong	(China) Zhang Yaqi
3	R2	(Japan) Suzuka International Racing Course		(France) Florian Latorre	(France) Florian Latorre	(China) Meidong Racing	(China) Bao Jinlong	(China) Zhang Yaqi
4	R1	(Thailand) Buriram International Circuit	(France) Florian Latorre	(New Zealand) Chris van der Drift	(New Zealand) Chris van der Drift	(China) Team Shanghai Yongda	(China) Zhou Bihuang	(China) Li Xuanyu
4	R2	(Thailand) Buriram International Circuit		(China) Luo Kailuo	(China) Luo Kailuo	(China) TORO Racing	(China) Bao Jinlong	(China) Yang Ruoyu
5	R1	(Malaysia) Sepang International Circuit	(France) Florian Latorre	(New Zealand) Chris van der Drift	(New Zealand) Chris van der Drift	(China) Team Shanghai Yongda	(China) Bao Jinlong	(China) Yang Ruoyu
5	R2	(Malaysia) Sepang International Circuit		(Austria) Martin Ragginger	(New Zealand) Chris van der Drift	(China) Team Shanghai Yongda	(China) Zhou Bihuang	(China) Yang Ruoyu
6	R1	(Singapore) Marina Bay Street Circuit	(France) Florian Latorre	(China) Luo Kailuo	(France) Florian Latorre	(China) Meidong Racing	(China) Bao Jinlong	(China) Yang Ruoyu
6	R2	(Singapore) Marina Bay Street Circuit		(France) Florian Latorre	(France) Florian Latorre	(China) Meidong Racing	(China) Bao Jinlong	(Hong Kong) Eric Kwong
7	R1	(China) Shanghai International Circuit	(New Zealand) Chris van der Drift	(France) Florian Latorre	(New Zealand) Chris van der Drift	(China) Team Shanghai Yongda	(China) Bao Jinlong	(China) Yang Ruoyu
7	R2	(China) Shanghai International Circuit		(China) Luo Kailuo	(China) Luo Kailuo	(China) TORO Racing	(China) Bao Jinlong	(China) Li Xuanyu

== Championship standings ==
=== Scoring system ===
Points were awarded to the top fifteen classified drivers in every race, using the following system:

Position	1st	2nd	3rd	4th	5th	6th	7th	8th	9th	10th	11th	12th	13th	14th	15th
Points	25	20	17	14	12	10	9	8	7	6	5	4	3	2	1

=== Overall ===
Pos.	Driver	SEP1 (Malaysia)		KOR (South Korea)		SUZ (Japan)		BUR (Thailand)		SEP2 (Malaysia)		MRN (Singapore)		SIC (China)		Points
Pos.	Driver	R1	R2	R1	R2	R1	R2	R1	R2	R1	R2	R1	R2	R1	R2	Points
1	(France) Florian Latorre	4	2	1	2	1	1	2	2	6	2	1	1	2	3	300
2	(New Zealand) Chris van der Drift	2	3	3	5	3	4	1	3	1	1	4	3	1	2	271
3	(China) Luo Kailuo	1	1	2	1	13	2	3	1	4	3	2	2	6	1	266
4	(Austria) Martin Ragginger	3	4	5	4	5	3	4	4	2	4	3	4	3	4	213
5	(China) Bao Jinlong	Ret	7	6	7	6	6	7	5	5	8	6	6	5	6	131
6	(Malaysia) Nazim Azman	5	5	8	Ret	4	5			3	5	5	5	9	5	130
7	(China) Zhou Bihuang	8	8	18	8	10	11	6	7	8	7	Ret	8	7	12	92
8	(China) Gao Yujia	6	6	7	Ret	11	7	8	Ret	7	6	9	Ret	11	10	88
9	(China) Eric Zang	9	9	9	6	9	9	17	10			7	7	8	14	79
10	(China) Yang Ruoyu	11	10	Ret	10	12	10	Ret	9	9	10	8	14	10	17	63
11	(Netherlands) Francis Tjia	Ret	11	10	13			9	11	12	11	10	12	13	13	52
12	(New Zealand) Reid Harker			4	3			5	6							51
13	(China) Hong Shijie	Ret	12	Ret	9			Ret	8	19†	9	11	9	12	7	51
14	(China) Li Chao	7	Ret	13	12	8	16	11	18	10	12	18	13	18	11	48
15	(China) Wu Jiaxin	10	20	12	Ret	7	13	13	12	Ret	16	14	15	14	16	35
16	(China) Li Xuanyu	17	14	11	14	17	Ret	10	16	11	20	16	11	15	9	30
17	(China) Zhang Yaqi					2	8									28
18	(Hong Kong) Eric Kwong	14	13	Ret	11	Ret	12	12	19	16	14	12	10	16	18	28
19	(Canada) Scott Hargrove													4	8	22
20	(Canada) John Shen	12	17	17	18			16	15	13	15	13	Ret	19	20	13
21	(Canada) Christian Chia	15	16	16	15	14	17	14	14	14	18	15	17			12
22	(Malaysia) Adrian D'Silva	13	15			15	14	Ret	13							10
23	(Chinese Taipei) Jacky Wu	Ret	19	14	17	16	15	18	20	18	19	17	18	20	15	5
24	(China) Li Sushang									Ret	13					3
25	(China) Zhu Zhiyao	16	18	15	16	Ret	19	15	17	15	21	Ret	16	17	19	3
26	(Malaysia) Aaron Foong									17	17	Ret	19			0
27	(Hong Kong) Samson Chan					18	18									0
28	(United States) Kerong Li													21	21	0
Pos.	Driver	R1	R2	R1	R2	R1	R2	R1	R2	R1	R2	R1	R2	R1	R2	Points
Pos.	Driver	SEP1 (Malaysia)		KOR (South Korea)		SUZ (Japan)		BUR (Thailand)		SEP2 (Malaysia)		MRN (Singapore)		SIC (China)		Points

=== Pro-Am ===
Pos.	Driver	SEP (Malaysia)		KOR (South Korea)		SUZ (Japan)		BUR (Thailand)		SEP (Malaysia)		MRN (Singapore)		SIC (China)		Points
Pos.	Driver	R1	R2	R1	R2	R1	R2	R1	R2	R1	R2	R1	R2	R1	R2	Points
1	(China) Bao Jinlong	Ret	1	1	2	1	1	2	1	1	2	1	1	1	1	325
2	(China) Zhou Bihuang	2	2	5	3	4	3	1	2	2	1	Ret	3	2	4	245
3	(China) Eric Zang	3	3	2	1	3	2	5	4			2	2	3	6	211
4	(China) Li Chao	1	Ret	4	5	2	4	4	6	3	5	5	6	6	3	187
5	(Netherlands) Francis Tjia	Ret	4	3	6			3	5	4	4	3	5	5	5	151
6	(China) Hong Shijie	Ret	5	Ret	4			Ret	3	5	3	4	4	4	2	122
Pos.	Driver	R1	R2	R1	R2	R1	R2	R1	R2	R1	R2	R1	R2	R1	R2	Points
Pos.	Driver	SEP (Malaysia)		KOR (South Korea)		SUZ (Japan)		BUR (Thailand)		SEP (Malaysia)		MRN (Singapore)		SIC (China)		Points

=== Am ===
Pos.	Driver	SEP (Malaysia)		KOR (South Korea)		SUZ (Japan)		BUR (Thailand)		SEP (Malaysia)		MRN (Singapore)		SIC (China)		Points
Pos.	Driver	R1	R2	R1	R2	R1	R2	R1	R2	R1	R2	R1	R2	R1	R2	Points
1	(China) Yang Ruoyu	2	1	Ret	1	3	2	Ret	1	1	1	1	3	1	4	273
2	(China) Li Xuanyu	8	3	1	3	7	Ret	1	6	2	9	6	2	3	1	205
3	(China) Wu Jiaxin	1	9	2	Ret	2	4	3	2	9	5	4	4	2	3	203
4	(Hong Kong) Eric Kwong	5	2	Ret	2	Ret	3	2	8	6	3	2	1	4	5	195
5	(Canada) Christian Chia	6	5	5	4	4	7	4	4	4	7	5	6			148
6	(Canada) John Shen	3	6	6	7			6	5	3	4	3	9	6	7	146
7	(Chinese Taipei) Jacky Wu	Ret	8	4	6	6	6	7	9	8	8	7	7	7	2	138
8	(China) Zhu Zhiyao	7	7	3	5	Ret	9	5	7	5	10	Ret	5	5	6	126
9	(Malaysia) Adrian D'Silva	4	4			5	5	Ret	3							69
10	(China) Zhang Yaqi					1	1									50
11	(Malaysia) Aaron Foong									7	6	Ret	8			25
12	(China) Li Sushang									Ret	2					20
13	(Hong Kong) Samson Chan					8	8									16
14	(United States) Kerong Li													8	8	16
Pos.	Driver	R1	R2	R1	R2	R1	R2	R1	R2	R1	R2	R1	R2	R1	R2	Points
Pos.	Driver	SEP (Malaysia)		KOR (South Korea)		SUZ (Japan)		BUR (Thailand)		SEP (Malaysia)		MRN (Singapore)		SIC (China)		Points

=== Dealer Trophy ===
Pos.	Team	Pts
1	(China) Meidong Racing	286
2	(China) Team Shanghai Yongda	273
3	(China) TORO Racing	271
4	(Austria) Porsche Holding	217
5	(Malaysia) Sime Darby Racing Team	158
6	(China) Zheng Tong Auto	140
7	(China) Porsche Beijing Central & Goldenport	108
8	(Hong Kong) Team Jebsen	100
9	(China) Team Betterlife	87
10	(China) BD Group	83
11	(China) Shanghai Pudong & Waigaoqiao 69 Racing	69
12	(China) Team C&D	60

== See also ==
- 2023 Porsche Supercup
