= Luo Kailuo =

Chinese racing driver (born 1998)

Luo Kailuo 罗开罗
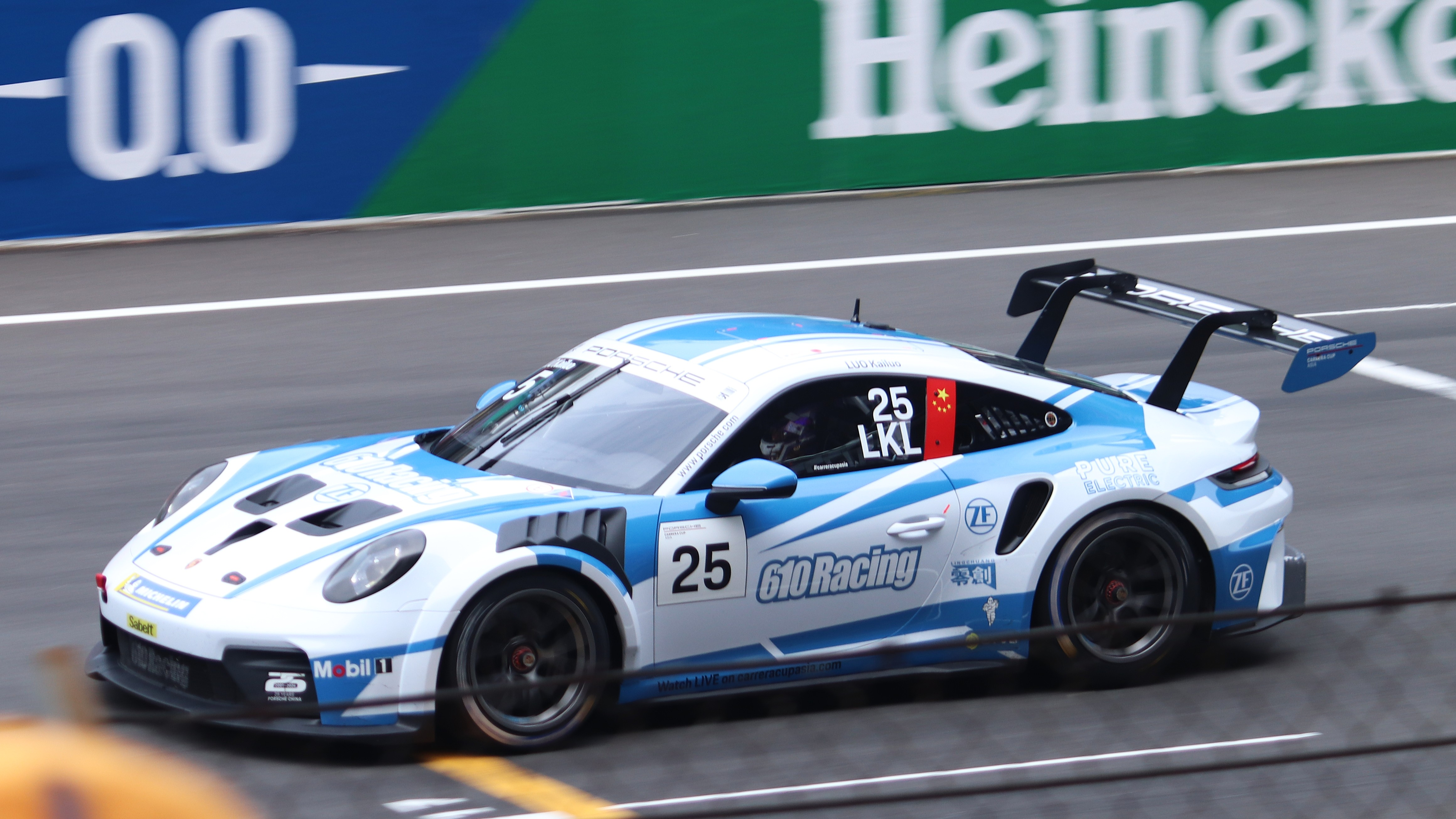
- Luo in 2026
- Nationality: (China) Chinese
- Born: 7 May 1998 (age 28) Beijing, China

Porsche Carrera Cup Asia career
- Debut season: 2022
- Current team: 610 Racing
- Categorisation: FIA Silver
- Car number: 25
- Former teams: TORO Racing
- Starts: 24
- Wins: 8
- Podiums: 18
- Poles: 2
- Fastest laps: 5
- Best finish: 2nd in 2022

Previous series
- 2024–2025 2017–2018 2017: GT World Challenge Asia; Asian Formula Renault Series; Formula Masters China

Luo Kailuo (Chinese: 罗开罗; pinyin: Luó Kāiluó, born 7 May 1998) is a Chinese racing driver who competes for 610 Racing in the China GT Championship. He is an overall GT World Challenge Asia and Sepang 12 Hours winner for Harmony Racing, and previously won in Porsche Carrera Cup Asia and the Greater Bay Area GT Cup for TORO Racing.

== Career ==
Luo competed in national karting in his early years, most notably winning the 2016 Shanghai Karting Endurance Race alongside Daniel Cao, as well as the 2019 RMC China title in Senior Max.

In 2017, Luo joined Linky Racing to make his single-seater debut in Formula Masters China, scoring a best result of fourth at Zhuhai and Shanghai to end the season tenth overall. That year, Luo also raced part-time in the Asian Formula Renault Series, in which he took a lone win at Zhejiang for S&D Motorsports. Continuing with S&D for a full-season in the Asian Formula Renault Series in 2018, Luo won at Shanghai and took four other podiums to secure runner-up honours in the Pro class.

In 2019, Luo made his debut in sportscar racing, competing for McLaren-fielding The Winning Team in the GT4 class of the China GT Championship. After two years on the sidelines, Luo joined TORO Racing in 2022 to enter Porsche Carrera Cup Asia, winning both races of the third Zhuzhou round to secure runner-up honours in the overall standings, behind Ye Hongli. Continuing with TORO for 2023, Luo began the season with three wins between Sepang and Korea, before taking further wins at Buriram and Shanghai to end the season third overall. At the end of the year, Luo drove a Lotus Emira GT4 for Lotus Team TORO in the Greater Bay Area GT Cup at Macau, finishing second in the GT4 qualifying race to teammate Adam Christodoulou, before edging him out to win the main race.

In 2024, Luo made his debut in GT3 competition, joining Ferrari-fielding Harmony Racing to race in GT World Challenge Asia alongside Liang Jiatong in the Silver Cup. In his rookie season, Luo scored a lone class win at Sepang and three other podiums to take fifth in points. Liu then began 2025 with a breakthrough win at the Sepang 12 Hours, driving a Garfield-liveried Ferrari 296 GT3 for 33R Harmony Racing with Jason Loh, Weian Chen and Jazeman Jaafar. After a one-off appearance in the SRO GT Cup for Team Pegasus, Luo reunited with Harmony for the final four rounds of GT World Challenge Asia alongside Deng Yi. Competing in the Silver Cup, Luo took an overall win at Okayama, as well as a class win at Fuji and a class pole in Beijing to take sixth in points.

In 2026, Luo returned to the China GT Championship with 610 Racing. That year, Luo raced with the team as a guest entry at the Shanghai opener of Porsche Carrera Cup Asia, winning race two.

== Karting record ==
=== Karting career summary ===
Season	Series	Team	Position
2019	RMC Grand Finals – Senior Max	Tian Qixian	49th

== Racing record ==
=== Racing career summary ===
Season	Series	Team	Races	Wins	Poles	F/Laps	Podiums	Points	Position
2017	Formula Masters China	Linky Racing	16	0	0	0	0	44	10th
2017	Asian Formula Renault Series – Class A	S&D Motorsports	4	1	0	1	1	97	8th
2017	Asian Formula Renault Series – Class A	BlackArts Racing Team	2	0	0	0	0	97	8th
2018	Asian Formula Renault Series – Pro	S&D Motorsports	12	1	0	1	5	189	**2nd**
2019	China GT Championship – GT4	The Winning Team	4	0	0	0	0	45.5	22nd
2022	Porsche Carrera Cup Asia	TORO Racing	8	2	2	1	6	137	**2nd**
2023	Porsche Carrera Cup Asia	TORO Racing	14	5	0	4	11	266	**3rd**
2023	Porsche Supercup	Martinet by Alméras	0	0	0	0	0	0	NC†
2023	Greater Bay Area GT Cup	Lotus Team TORO	1	1	0	1	1	—N/a	**1st**
2024	GT World Challenge Asia	Harmony Racing	9	0	0	0	1	23	25th
2024	GT World Challenge Asia – Silver	Harmony Racing	8	1	1	0	4	108	5th
2024	GT World Challenge Asia – Silver-Am	Harmony Racing	1	0	0	0	0	0	NC†
2025	Sepang 12 Hours	33R Harmony Racing	1	1	0	0	1	—N/a	**1st**
2025	SRO GT Cup	Team Pegasus	2	0	0	0	1	15	14th
2025	SRO GT Cup – Silver	Team Pegasus	2	0	0	0	1	15	11th
2025	China GT Championship – GT3	Winhere Harmony Racing	2	0	0	0	2	40	9th
2025	China GT Championship – GT3	Origine Motorsport	2	0	0	0	0	40	9th
2025	China GT Championship – GT3 Pro-Am	Origine Motorsport	2	0	0	0	0	12	23rd
2025	GT World Challenge Asia	Winhere Harmony Racing	7	1	4	0	2	45	15th
2025	GT World Challenge Asia – Silver	Winhere Harmony Racing	7	2	5	0	3	92	6th
2026	Porsche Carrera Cup Asia	610 Racing	2	1	0	1	1	0	NC†
2026	China GT Championship – GT3	610 Racing	5	0	0	0	0	20*	10th*
2026	China GT Championship – GT3 Pro-Am	610 Racing	5	0	0	0	0	30*	7th*
2026	Shanghai 8 Hours	610 Racing	1	0	0	0	0	—N/a	6th

* Season still in progress.
^{†} As Luo was a guest driver, he was ineligible for points.

=== Complete Formula Masters China results ===
(key) (Races in bold indicate pole position) (Races in italics indicate fastest lap)

Year	Entrant	1	2	3	4	5	6	7	8	9	10	11	12	13	14	15	16	17	18	DC	Points
2017	Linky Racing	SEP1; 1; 8	SEP1; 2; 12	SEP1; 3; 5	SEP1; 4 Ret	SEP2; 1; 9	SEP2; 2; 9	SEP2; 3; 11	SEP2; 4; 8	ZIC1; 1; 4	ZIC1; 2 Ret	ZIC1; 3 DNS	ZIC2; 1; 9	ZIC2; 2 DNS	ZIC2; 3; 9	SIC; 1 Ret	SIC; 2; 5	SIC; 3; 7	SIC; 4; 4	10th	44

=== Complete Porsche Carrera Cup Asia results ===
(key) (Races in bold indicate pole position; races in italics indicate points for the fastest lap of top ten finishers)

Year	Entrant	Class	1	2	3	4	5	6	7	8	9	10	11	12	13	14	DC	Points
2022	TORO Racing	Pro	ZHO1; 1; 3	ZHO1; 2; 3	TIA; 1; 5	TIA; 2; 7	ZHO2; 1; 3	ZHO2; 2; 3	**ZHO3**; **1**; 1	**ZHO3**; **2**; 1							2nd	137
2023	TORO Racing	Pro	SEP1; 1; 1	SEP1; 2; 1	KOR; 1; 2	KOR; 2; 1	SUZ; 1; 13	SUZ; 2; 2	BUR; 1; 3	BUR; 2; 1	SEP2; 1; 4	SEP2; 2; 3	MRN; 1; 2	MRN; 2; 2	SIC; 1; 6	SIC; 2; 1	3rd	266
2026	610 Racing	Pro	SIC; 1; 5	SIC; 2; 1	ZHU; 1	ZHU; 2	FUJ; 1	FUJ; 2	BAN; 1	BAN; 2	SEP; 1	SEP; 2	SEP; 3	MRN; 1	MRN; 2		NC†*	0†*

^{*} Season still in progress.

=== Complete GT World Challenge Asia results ===
(key) (Races in bold indicate pole position) (Races in italics indicate fastest lap)

Year	Team	Car	Class	1	2	3	4	5	6	7	8	9	10	11	12	DC	Points
2024	Harmony Racing	Ferrari 296 GT3	Silver	SEP; 1; 5	SEP; 2; 1	BUR; 1; 5	BUR; 2 Ret	FUJ; 1; 3†	**FUJ**; **2**; 2	SUZ; 1; 4	SUZ; 2; 2	OKA; 1	OKA; 2			5th	108
2024	Harmony Racing	Ferrari 296 GT3	Silver-Am											SIC; 1 DNS	SIC; 2; 6	NC†	0†
2025	Winhere Harmony Racing	Ferrari 296 GT3	Silver	SEP; 1	SEP; 2	MAN; 1	MAN; 2	**BUR**; **1**; 2	BUR; 2 Ret	**FUJ**; **1**; 4	FUJ; 2; 1	**OKA**; **1**; 1	OKA; 2; 4	**BEI**; **1** Ret	**BEI**; **2** DNS	6th	92
