= 2024 GT World Challenge Asia =

Motor racing competition season

The 2024 Fanatec GT World Challenge Asia Powered by AWS was the sixth season of the GT World Challenge Asia, an auto racing series for grand tourer cars in Asia, co-promoted by the SRO Motorsports Group and Team Asia One GT Management. The races are contested with GT3-spec cars only, as the GT4 class was dropped from the series and moved to the Japan Cup Series. The season began on 20 April at the Sepang International Circuit in Malaysia and is scheduled to end on 15 September at Shanghai International Circuit in China.

Starting from this season, the Japan Cup Series is separated from the main GTWCA race, and would run as a stand alone race.

== Calendar ==
Round	Circuit	Date
1	(Malaysia) Sepang International Circuit, Sepang District, Selangor	20–21 April
2	Chang International Circuit, Buriram, Thailand	11–12 May
3	(Japan) Fuji Speedway, Oyama, Shizuoka	22–23 June
4	(Japan) Suzuka International Racing Course, Suzuka, Mie	6–7 July
5	(Japan) Okayama International Circuit, Mimasaka, Okayama	24–25 August
6	Shanghai International Circuit, Shanghai, China	14–15 September

== Entry list ==
Team	Car	Engine	No.	Drivers	Class	Rounds
(Hong Kong) Absolute Racing	Porsche 911 GT3 R (992)	Porsche M97/80 4.2 L Flat-6	1	(China) Anthony Liu Xu	PA	All
(Hong Kong) Absolute Racing	Porsche 911 GT3 R (992)	Porsche M97/80 4.2 L Flat-6	1	(Belgium) Alessio Picariello	PA	All
(Hong Kong) Absolute Racing	Porsche 911 GT3 R (992)	Porsche M97/80 4.2 L Flat-6	911	(Sri Lanka) Eshan Pieris	S	All
(Hong Kong) Absolute Racing	Porsche 911 GT3 R (992)	Porsche M97/80 4.2 L Flat-6	911	(Thailand) Tanart Sathienthirakul	S	All
(China) Phantom Global Racing	Audi R8 LMS Evo II	Audi DAR 5.2 L V10	2	(China) Hu Bo	PA	6
(China) Phantom Global Racing	Audi R8 LMS Evo II	Audi DAR 5.2 L V10	2	(Luxembourg) Dylan Pereira	PA	6
(China) Phantom Global Racing	Porsche 911 GT3 R (992)	Porsche M97/80 4.2 L Flat-6	13	(China) Sun Jingzu	PA	1–4
(China) Phantom Global Racing	Porsche 911 GT3 R (992)	Porsche M97/80 4.2 L Flat-6	13	(New Zealand) Jaxon Evans (Note: Jaxon Evans competed under an Australian license for the second round.)	PA	2–3
(China) Phantom Global Racing	Porsche 911 GT3 R (992)	Porsche M97/80 4.2 L Flat-6	13	(Germany) Timo Bernhard	PA	4
(China) Phantom Global Racing	Porsche 911 GT3 R (992)	Porsche M97/80 4.2 L Flat-6	13	(France) Dorian Boccolacci	PA	5–6
(China) Phantom Global Racing	Porsche 911 GT3 R (992)	Porsche M97/80 4.2 L Flat-6	13	(China) Chris Chia On	PA	5–6
(China) Phantom Global Racing	Porsche 911 GT3 R (992)	Porsche M97/80 4.2 L Flat-6	13	(Sweden) Joel Eriksson	PA	1
(China) AAS Phantom Global Racing	Porsche 911 GT3 R (992)	Porsche M97/80 4.2 L Flat-6	93	(Sweden) Joel Eriksson	PA	3–6
(China) AAS Phantom Global Racing	Porsche 911 GT3 R (992)	Porsche M97/80 4.2 L Flat-6	93	(Thailand) Vutthikorn Inthraphuvasak	PA	All
(China) AAS Phantom Global Racing	Porsche 911 GT3 R (992)	Porsche M97/80 4.2 L Flat-6	93	(Denmark) Bastian Buus	PA	1–2
(Macau) Elegant Racing Team	Mercedes-AMG GT3 Evo	Mercedes-AMG M159 6.2 L V8	3	(Macau) André Couto	SA	1
(Macau) Elegant Racing Team	Mercedes-AMG GT3 Evo	Mercedes-AMG M159 6.2 L V8	3	(Macau) Liu Lic Ka	SA	1
(Macau) Elegant Racing Team	Mercedes-AMG GT3 Evo	Mercedes-AMG M159 6.2 L V8	3	(Macau) Liu Lic Ka	Am	3, 6
(China) Origine Motorsport	Porsche 911 GT3 R (992)	Porsche M97/80 4.2 L Flat-6	4	(China) Lu Wei	PA	All
(China) Origine Motorsport	Porsche 911 GT3 R (992)	Porsche M97/80 4.2 L Flat-6	4	(Germany) Laurin Heinrich	PA	1, 4, 6
(China) Origine Motorsport	Porsche 911 GT3 R (992)	Porsche M97/80 4.2 L Flat-6	4	(France) Patrick Pilet	PA	2–3
(China) Origine Motorsport	Porsche 911 GT3 R (992)	Porsche M97/80 4.2 L Flat-6	4	(Denmark) Bastian Buus	PA	5
(China) Origine Motorsport	Porsche 911 GT3 R (992)	Porsche M97/80 4.2 L Flat-6	87	(China) Leo Ye Hongli	SA	All
(China) Origine Motorsport	Porsche 911 GT3 R (992)	Porsche M97/80 4.2 L Flat-6	87	(China) Yuan Bo	SA	All
(Italy) VSR	Lamborghini Huracán GT3 Evo 2	Lamborghini DGF 5.2 L V10	6	(China) Bian Ye (Note: Bian Ye used the name Bian Hao for the second, third, fifth, and sixth round.)	PA	All
(Italy) VSR	Lamborghini Huracán GT3 Evo 2	Lamborghini DGF 5.2 L V10	6	(Italy) Edoardo Liberati	PA	All
(Italy) VSR	Lamborghini Huracán GT3 Evo 2	Lamborghini DGF 5.2 L V10	63	(Italy) Marco Mapelli (Note: Marco Mapelli competed under a Swiss license for the first and third round.)	PA	1–3
(Italy) VSR	Lamborghini Huracán GT3 Evo 2	Lamborghini DGF 5.2 L V10	63	(China) Zhou Bihuang	PA	1–3
(Italy) VSR	Lamborghini Huracán GT3 Evo 2	Lamborghini DGF 5.2 L V10	63	(United Kingdom) Douglas Bolger (Note: Douglas Bolger is a Japanese driver competing under a British license.)	SA	4
(Italy) VSR	Lamborghini Huracán GT3 Evo 2	Lamborghini DGF 5.2 L V10	63	(Japan) Yudai Uchida	SA	4
(Italy) VSR	Lamborghini Huracán GT3 Evo 2	Lamborghini DGF 5.2 L V10	63	(Chinese Taipei) Gavin Huang	SA	5
(Italy) VSR	Lamborghini Huracán GT3 Evo 2	Lamborghini DGF 5.2 L V10	63	(Chinese Taipei) Johnson Huang	SA	5
(Italy) VSR	Lamborghini Huracán GT3 Evo 2	Lamborghini DGF 5.2 L V10	63	(Hong Kong) Daniel Bilski	SA	6
(Italy) VSR	Lamborghini Huracán GT3 Evo 2	Lamborghini DGF 5.2 L V10	63	(Singapore) Ethan Yang Brown	SA	6
(Japan) ANR with VSR	Lamborghini Huracán GT3 Evo 2	Lamborghini DGF 5.2 L V10	563	(Japan) Akira Mizutani	SA	All
(Japan) ANR with VSR	Lamborghini Huracán GT3 Evo 2	Lamborghini DGF 5.2 L V10	563	(Japan) Yuki Nemoto	SA	All
(New Zealand) EBM	Aston Martin Vantage AMR GT3 Evo	Aston Martin M177 4.0 L Turbo V8	8	(Indonesia) Setiawan Santoso	Am	All
(New Zealand) EBM	Porsche 911 GT3 R (992)	Porsche M97/80 4.2 L Flat-6	321	(China) Li Xuanyu	SA	6
(New Zealand) EBM	Porsche 911 GT3 R (992)	Porsche M97/80 4.2 L Flat-6	321	(China) Daniel Lu	SA	6
(Japan) GTO Racing Team	Porsche 911 GT3 R (992)	Porsche M97/80 4.2 L Flat-6	14	(Chinese Taipei) Brian Lee	SA	All
(Japan) GTO Racing Team	Porsche 911 GT3 R (992)	Porsche M97/80 4.2 L Flat-6	14	(Japan) Hideto Yasuoka	SA	All
(Japan) Porsche Center Okazaki	Porsche 911 GT3 R (992)	Porsche M97/80 4.2 L Flat-6	18	(Japan) Hiroaki Nagai	SA	All
(Japan) Porsche Center Okazaki	Porsche 911 GT3 R (992)	Porsche M97/80 4.2 L Flat-6	18	(Japan) Yuta Kamimura	SA	1–2, 4–6
(Japan) Porsche Center Okazaki	Porsche 911 GT3 R (992)	Porsche M97/80 4.2 L Flat-6	18	(Japan) Kiyoto Fujinami	SA	3
(Japan) Porsche Center Okazaki	Porsche 911 GT3 R (992)	Porsche M97/80 4.2 L Flat-6	25	(Japan) Tsubasa Kondo	SA	1–5
(Japan) Porsche Center Okazaki	Porsche 911 GT3 R (992)	Porsche M97/80 4.2 L Flat-6	25	(Japan) Kiyoshi Uchiyama	SA	1–5
(Japan) The Spirit of FFF Racing	Audi R8 LMS Evo II	Audi DAR 5.2 L V10	19	(Japan) Mineki Okura	Am	1–4
(Japan) The Spirit of FFF Racing	Audi R8 LMS Evo II	Audi DAR 5.2 L V10	19	(Japan) Hiroshi Hamaguchi	Am	1–3
(China) Climax Racing	Mercedes-AMG GT3 Evo	Mercedes-AMG M159 6.2 L V8	22	(China) Wang Zhongwei	PA	All
(China) Climax Racing	Mercedes-AMG GT3 Evo	Mercedes-AMG M159 6.2 L V8	22	(Estonia) Ralf Aron	PA	1–2, 4–6
(China) Climax Racing	Mercedes-AMG GT3 Evo	Mercedes-AMG M159 6.2 L V8	22	(Andorra) Jules Gounon	PA	3
(China) Climax Racing	Mercedes-AMG GT3 Evo	Mercedes-AMG M159 6.2 L V8	52	(China) Li Lichao	SA	1–2
(China) Climax Racing	Mercedes-AMG GT3 Evo	Mercedes-AMG M159 6.2 L V8	52	(China) Liu Hangcheng	SA	1–2
(China) Climax Racing	Mercedes-AMG GT3 Evo	Mercedes-AMG M159 6.2 L V8	52	(China) Liu Hangcheng	Am	3–5
(China) Climax Racing	Mercedes-AMG GT3 Evo	Mercedes-AMG M159 6.2 L V8	52	(China) Li Lichao	Am	3–6
(China) Climax Racing	Mercedes-AMG GT3 Evo	Mercedes-AMG M159 6.2 L V8	52	(China) Min Heng	Am	6
(China) Climax Racing	Mercedes-AMG GT3 Evo	Mercedes-AMG M159 6.2 L V8	66	(China) Min Heng	SA	1–3
(China) Climax Racing	Mercedes-AMG GT3 Evo	Mercedes-AMG M159 6.2 L V8	66	(Australia) Jaylyn Robotham	SA	1–3
(China) Climax Racing	Mercedes-AMG GT3 Evo	Mercedes-AMG M159 6.2 L V8	66	(Andorra) Jules Gounon	PA	4
(China) Climax Racing	Mercedes-AMG GT3 Evo	Mercedes-AMG M159 6.2 L V8	66	(China) Zhou Bihuang	PA	4
(China) Climax Racing	Mercedes-AMG GT3 Evo	Mercedes-AMG M159 6.2 L V8	66	(China) Zhou Bihuang	Am	5–6
(China) Climax Racing	Mercedes-AMG GT3 Evo	Mercedes-AMG M159 6.2 L V8	66	(China) Hu Yuqi	Am	5–6
(Thailand) B-Quik Absolute Racing	Audi R8 LMS Evo II	Audi DAR 5.2 L V10	26	(Australia) Rodney Jane	Am	2
(Thailand) B-Quik Absolute Racing	Audi R8 LMS Evo II	Audi DAR 5.2 L V10	26	(Netherlands) Henk Kiks	Am	2
(Hong Kong) Audi Sport Asia Team Absolute	Audi R8 LMS Evo II	Audi DAR 5.2 L V10	40	(Germany) Markus Winkelhock	PA	All
(Hong Kong) Audi Sport Asia Team Absolute	Audi R8 LMS Evo II	Audi DAR 5.2 L V10	40	(China) Huang Ruohan	PA	1–5
(Hong Kong) Audi Sport Asia Team Absolute	Audi R8 LMS Evo II	Audi DAR 5.2 L V10	40	(Hong Kong) Antares Au	Am	6
(Hong Kong) Audi Sport Asia Team Absolute	Audi R8 LMS Evo II	Audi DAR 5.2 L V10	41	(Malaysia) Akash Neil Nandy	S	All
(Hong Kong) Audi Sport Asia Team Absolute	Audi R8 LMS Evo II	Audi DAR 5.2 L V10	41	(China) James Yu Kuai	S	All
(Hong Kong) Craft-Bamboo Racing	Mercedes-AMG GT3 Evo	Mercedes-AMG M159 6.2 L V8	30	(China) Cao Qi	PA	All
(Hong Kong) Craft-Bamboo Racing	Mercedes-AMG GT3 Evo	Mercedes-AMG M159 6.2 L V8	30	(Canada) Daniel Morad	PA	1, 4, 6
(Hong Kong) Craft-Bamboo Racing	Mercedes-AMG GT3 Evo	Mercedes-AMG M159 6.2 L V8	30	(Germany) Maro Engel	PA	2–3
(Hong Kong) Craft-Bamboo Racing	Mercedes-AMG GT3 Evo	Mercedes-AMG M159 6.2 L V8	30	(Japan) João Paulo de Oliveira (Note: João Paulo de Oliveira is a Brazilian driver competing under a Japanese license.)	PA	5
(Hong Kong) Craft-Bamboo Racing	Mercedes-AMG GT3 Evo	Mercedes-AMG M159 6.2 L V8	88	(Chinese Taipei) Jeffrey Lee	PA	All
(Hong Kong) Craft-Bamboo Racing	Mercedes-AMG GT3 Evo	Mercedes-AMG M159 6.2 L V8	88	(Germany) Fabian Schiller	PA	1, 4–5
(Hong Kong) Craft-Bamboo Racing	Mercedes-AMG GT3 Evo	Mercedes-AMG M159 6.2 L V8	88	(Germany) Maximilian Götz	PA	2, 6
(Hong Kong) Craft-Bamboo Racing	Mercedes-AMG GT3 Evo	Mercedes-AMG M159 6.2 L V8	88	(Australia) Jayden Ojeda	PA	3
(Hong Kong) FAW Audi Sport Asia Racing Team	Audi R8 LMS Evo II	Audi DAR 5.2 L V10	36	(China) Franky Cheng Congfu	S	All
(Hong Kong) FAW Audi Sport Asia Racing Team	Audi R8 LMS Evo II	Audi DAR 5.2 L V10	36	(Hong Kong) Adderly Fong (Note: Adderly Fong competed under a Chinese license for the first round.)	S	All
(South Korea) Vollgas Motorsports	Porsche 911 GT3 R (992)	Porsche M97/80 4.2 L Flat-6	44	(South Korea) Han Min-kwan	SA	All
(South Korea) Vollgas Motorsports	Porsche 911 GT3 R (992)	Porsche M97/80 4.2 L Flat-6	44	(South Korea) Kim Jae-hyun	SA	1, 3–6
(Australia) AMAC Motorsport	Porsche 911 GT3 R (991.2)	Porsche 4.0 L Flat-6	51	(Australia) Andrew Macpherson	Am	All
(Australia) AMAC Motorsport	Porsche 911 GT3 R (991.2)	Porsche 4.0 L Flat-6	51	(Australia) William Ben Porter	Am	All
(Japan) LM Corsa	Ferrari 296 GT3	Ferrari F163CE 3.0 L Turbo V6	60	(Japan) Ryo Ogawa	S	1–2
(Japan) LM Corsa	Ferrari 296 GT3	Ferrari F163CE 3.0 L Turbo V6	60	(Japan) Shigekazu Wakisaka	S	1–2
(Japan) LM Corsa	Ferrari 296 GT3	Ferrari F163CE 3.0 L Turbo V6	60	(Japan) Shigekazu Wakisaka	PA	3–5
(Japan) LM Corsa	Ferrari 296 GT3	Ferrari F163CE 3.0 L Turbo V6	60	(Japan) Kei Nakanishi	PA	3–5
(Indonesia) Garage 75	Ferrari 296 GT3	Ferrari F163CE 3.0 L Turbo V6	75	(Indonesia) David Tjiptobiantoro	Am	All
(Indonesia) Garage 75	Ferrari 296 GT3	Ferrari F163CE 3.0 L Turbo V6	75	(Italy) Christian Colombo	Am	1, 3–6
(Indonesia) Garage 75	Ferrari 296 GT3	Ferrari F163CE 3.0 L Turbo V6	75	(Italy) Massimiliano Wiser	Am	2
(China) Harmony Racing	Ferrari 296 GT3	Ferrari F163CE 3.0 L Turbo V6	77	(China) Liang Jiatong	S	All
(China) Harmony Racing	Ferrari 296 GT3	Ferrari F163CE 3.0 L Turbo V6	77	(China) Chen Weian	S	5–6
(China) Harmony Racing	Ferrari 296 GT3	Ferrari F163CE 3.0 L Turbo V6	77	(China) Luo Kailuo	S	1–4
(China) Harmony Racing	Ferrari 296 GT3	Ferrari F163CE 3.0 L Turbo V6	99	(China) Luo Kailuo	SA	6
(China) Harmony Racing	Ferrari 296 GT3	Ferrari F163CE 3.0 L Turbo V6	99	(China) Liu Hangcheng	SA	6
(China) Team KRC	BMW M4 GT3	BMW S58B30T0 3.0 L Turbo I6	89	(China) Ruan Cunfan	SA	All
(China) Team KRC	BMW M4 GT3	BMW S58B30T0 3.0 L Turbo I6	89	(New Zealand) Jono Lester	SA	1–2
(China) Team KRC	BMW M4 GT3	BMW S58B30T0 3.0 L Turbo I6	89	(Netherlands) Maxime Oosten	SA	3–6
(Hong Kong) Absolute Corse	Ferrari 296 GT3	Ferrari F163CE 3.0 L Turbo V6	296	(Philippines) "André Canard"	SA	All
(Hong Kong) Absolute Corse	Ferrari 296 GT3	Ferrari F163CE 3.0 L Turbo V6	296	(Germany) Finn Gehrsitz	SA	All
(Japan) Team 5ZIGEN	Nissan GT-R Nismo GT3	Nissan VR38DETT 3.8 L Twin Turbo V6	500	(Japan) "Hirobon"	SA	All
(Japan) Team 5ZIGEN	Nissan GT-R Nismo GT3	Nissan VR38DETT 3.8 L Twin Turbo V6	500	(Japan) Yu Kanamaru	SA	All
(Japan) D'station Racing	Aston Martin Vantage AMR GT3 Evo	Aston Martin M177 4.0 L Turbo V8	777	(Japan) Tomonobu Fujii	PA	1–5
(Japan) D'station Racing	Aston Martin Vantage AMR GT3 Evo	Aston Martin M177 4.0 L Turbo V8	777	(Japan) Satoshi Hoshino	PA	1–5
(Australia) Triple Eight JMR	Mercedes-AMG GT3 Evo	Mercedes-AMG M159 6.2 L V8	888	(Malaysia) Prince Abu Bakar Ibrahim	PA	All
(Australia) Triple Eight JMR	Mercedes-AMG GT3 Evo	Mercedes-AMG M159 6.2 L V8	888	(Australia) Jordan Love	PA	1
(Australia) Triple Eight JMR	Mercedes-AMG GT3 Evo	Mercedes-AMG M159 6.2 L V8	888	(Germany) Luca Stolz	PA	2–3, 5
(Australia) Triple Eight JMR	Mercedes-AMG GT3 Evo	Mercedes-AMG M159 6.2 L V8	888	(Canada) Mikael Grenier	PA	4, 6

Icon	Class
Drivers
S	Silver Cup
PA	Pro-Am Cup
SA	Silver-Am Cup
Am	Am Cup

== Race results ==
Bold indicates overall winner of the race.

Round		Circuit	Pole position	Pro/Am winners	Silver winners	Silver-Am winners	Am winners
1	R1	(Malaysia) Sepang	(Hong Kong) No. 36 FAW Audi Sport Asia Racing Team	(Italy) No. 6 VSR	**(Hong Kong) No. 36 FAW Audi Sport Asia Racing Team**	(China) No. 87 Origine Motorsport	(Indonesia) No. 75 Garage 75
1	R1	(Malaysia) Sepang	(China) Franky Cheng Congfu (China) Adderly Fong	(China) Bian Ye (Italy) Edoardo Liberati	**(China) Franky Cheng Congfu** **(China) Adderly Fong**	(China) Leo Ye Hongli (China) Yuan Bo	(Italy) Christian Colombo (Indonesia) David Tjiptobiantoro
1	R2	(Malaysia) Sepang	(China) No. 4 Origine Motorsport	**(China) No. 4 Origine Motorsport**	(China) No. 77 Harmony Racing	(China) No. 87 Origine Motorsport	(Japan) No. 19 The Spirit of FFF Racing
1	R2	(Malaysia) Sepang	(Germany) Laurin Heinrich (China) Lu Wei	**(Germany) Laurin Heinrich** **(China) Lu Wei**	(China) Liang Jiatong (China) Luo Kailuo	(China) Leo Ye Hongli (China) Yuan Bo	(Japan) Hiroshi Hamaguchi (Japan) Mineki Okura
2	R1	(Thailand) Buriram	(Hong Kong) No. 41 Audi Sport Asia Team Absolute	**(Hong Kong) No. 40 Audi Sport Asia Team Absolute**	(Hong Kong) No. 41 Audi Sport Asia Team Absolute	(China) No. 87 Origine Motorsport	(Japan) No. 19 The Spirit of FFF Racing
2	R1	(Thailand) Buriram	(Malaysia) Akash Neil Nandy (China) James Yu Kuai	**(China) Huang Ruohan** **(Germany) Markus Winkelhock**	(Malaysia) Akash Neil Nandy (China) James Yu Kuai	(China) Leo Ye Hongli (China) Yuan Bo	(Japan) Hiroshi Hamaguchi (Japan) Mineki Okura
2	R2	(Thailand) Buriram	(Australia) No. 888 Triple Eight JMR	**(China) No. 4 Origine Motorsport**	(Hong Kong) No. 911 Absolute Racing	(Japan) No. 500 Team 5ZIGEN	(Indonesia) No. 75 Garage 75
2	R2	(Thailand) Buriram	(Malaysia) Prince Abu Bakar Ibrahim (Germany) Luca Stolz	**(China) Lu Wei** **(France) Patrick Pilet**	(Sri Lanka) Eshan Pieris (Thailand) Tanart Sathienthirakul	(Japan) "Hirobon" (Japan) Yu Kanamaru	(Indonesia) David Tjiptobiantoro (Italy) Massimiliano Wiser
3	R1	(Japan) Fuji Speedway	(Australia) No. 888 Triple Eight JMR	(Italy) No. 6 VSR	(Hong Kong) No. 911 Absolute Racing	**(China) No. 87 Origine Motorsport**	(Indonesia) No. 75 Garage 75
3	R1	(Japan) Fuji Speedway	(Malaysia) Prince Abu Bakar Ibrahim (Germany) Luca Stolz	(China) Bian Ye (Italy) Edoardo Liberati	(Sri Lanka) Eshan Pieris (Thailand) Tanart Sathienthirakul	**(China) Leo Ye Hongli** **(China) Yuan Bo**	(Italy) Christian Colombo (Indonesia) David Tjiptobiantoro
3	R2	(Japan) Fuji Speedway	(Australia) No. 888 Triple Eight JMR	**(Hong Kong) No. 1 Absolute Racing**	(Hong Kong) No. 36 FAW Audi Sport Asia Racing Team	(Japan) No. 500 Team 5ZIGEN	(Australia) No. 51 AMAC Motorsport
3	R2	(Japan) Fuji Speedway	(Malaysia) Prince Abu Bakar Ibrahim (Germany) Luca Stolz	**(China) Anthony Liu Xu** **(Belgium) Alessio Picariello**	(China) Franky Cheng Congfu (Hong Kong) Adderly Fong	(Japan) "Hirobon" (Japan) Yu Kanamaru	(Australia) Andrew Macpherson (Australia) William Ben Porter
4	R1	(Japan) Suzuka	(Hong Kong) No. 41 Audi Sport Absolute Racing	(China) No. 4 Origine Motorsport	(Hong Kong) No. 911 Absolute Racing	**(Japan) No. 500 Team 5ZIGEN**	(Indonesia) No. 75 Garage 75
4	R1	(Japan) Suzuka	(Malaysia) Akash Neil Nandy (China) James Yu Kuai	(Germany) Laurin Heinrich (China) Lu Wei	(Sri Lanka) Eshan Pieris (Thailand) Tanart Sathienthirakul	**(Japan) "Hirobon"** **(Japan) Yu Kanamaru**	(Italy) Christian Colombo (Indonesia) David Tjiptobiantoro
4	R2	(Japan) Suzuka	(China) No. 66 Climax Racing	**(China) No. 66 Climax Racing**	(Hong Kong) No. 36 FAW Audi Sport Asia Racing Team	(China) No. 87 Origine Motorsport	(Australia) No. 51 AMAC Motorsport
4	R2	(Japan) Suzuka	(Andorra) Jules Gounon (China) Zhou Bihuang	**(Andorra) Jules Gounon** **(China) Zhou Bihuang**	(China) Franky Cheng Congfu (Hong Kong) Adderly Fong	(China) Leo Ye Hongli (China) Yuan Bo	(Australia) Andrew Macpherson (Australia) William Ben Porter
5	R1	(Japan) Okayama	(Hong Kong) No. 41 Audi Sport Absolute Racing	(Hong Kong) No. 40 Audi Sport Absolute Racing	**(Hong Kong) No. 41 Audi Sport Asia Team Absolute**	(China) No. 87 Origine Motorsport	(Indonesia) No. 75 Garage 75
5	R1	(Japan) Okayama	(Malaysia) Akash Neil Nandy (China) James Yu Kuai	(China) Huang Ruohan (Germany) Markus Winkelhock	**(Malaysia) Akash Neil Nandy** **(China) James Yu Kuai**	(China) Leo Ye Hongli (China) Yuan Bo	(Italy) Christian Colombo (Indonesia) David Tjiptobiantoro
5	R2	(Japan) Okayama	(China) No. 4 Origine Motorsport	**(Italy) No. 6 VSR**	(Hong Kong) No. 36 FAW Audi Sport Asia Racing Team	(South Korea) No. 44 Vollgas Motorsports	(China) No. 66 Climax Racing
5	R2	(Japan) Okayama	(Denmark) Bastian Buus (China) Lu Wei	**(China) Bian Ye** **(Italy) Edoardo Liberati**	(China) Franky Cheng Congfu (Hong Kong) Adderly Fong	(South Korea) Han Min-kwan (South Korea) Kim Jae-hyun	(China) Hu Yuqi (China) Zhou Bihuang
6	R1	(China) Shanghai	(China) No. 77 Harmony Racing	**(Hong Kong) No. 1 Absolute Racing**	(Hong Kong) No. 41 Audi Sport Absolute Racing	(China) No. 87 Origine Motorsport	(China) No. 66 Climax Racing
6	R1	(China) Shanghai	(China) Chen Weian (China) Liang Jiatong	**(China) Anthony Liu Xu** **(Belgium) Alessio Picariello**	(Malaysia) Akash Neil Nandy (China) James Yu Kuai	(China) Leo Ye Hongli (China) Yuan Bo	(China) Hu Yuqi (China) Zhou Bihuang
6	R2	(China) Shanghai	(China) No. 22 Climax Racing	(China) No. 22 Climax Racing	(China) No. 77 Harmony Racing	**(China) No. 87 Origine Motorsport**	(China) No. 66 Climax Racing
6	R2	(China) Shanghai	(Estonia) Ralf Aron (China) Wang Zhongwei	(Estonia) Ralf Aron (China) Wang Zhongwei	(China) Chen Weian (China) Liang Jiatong	**(China) Leo Ye Hongli** **(China) Yuan Bo**	(China) Hu Yuqi (China) Zhou Bihuang

== Championship standings ==
Scoring system

Championship points are awarded for the first ten positions in each race. Entries are required to complete 75% of the winning car's race distance in order to be classified and earn points. Individual drivers are required to participate for a minimum of 25 minutes in order to earn championship points in any race.

Position	**1st**	**2nd**	**3rd**	**4th**	**5th**	**6th**	**7th**	**8th**	**9th**	**10th**
Points	25	18	15	12	10	8	6	4	2	1

=== Drivers' championships ===
==== Overall ====
Pos.	Driver	Team	SEP (Malaysia)		BUR (Thailand)		FUJ (Japan)		SUZ (Japan)		OKA (Japan)		SHA (China)		Points
1	(China) Leo Ye Hongli (China) Yuan Bo	(China) No. 87 Origine Motorsport	3	6	5	4	1	Ret	24	4	2	10	4	1	138
2	(China) Anthony Liu Xu (Belgium) Alessio Picariello	(Hong Kong) No. 1 Absolute Racing	5	12	4	3	5	1	8	2	8	17	1	6	131
3	(China) Lu Wei	(China) No. 4 Origine Motorsport	7	**1**	14	1	15	7	2	3	5	**4**	Ret	5	127
4	(China) Franky Cheng Congfu (Hong Kong) Adderly Fong	(Hong Kong) No. 36 FAW Audi Sport Asia Racing Team	**1**	8	3	9	Ret	3	14	7	7	5	3	11	98
5	(Malaysia) Prince Abu Bakar Ibrahim	(Australia) No. 888 Triple Eight JMR	10	4	8	**22**	**Ret**	**4**	3	6	4	2	Ret	10	83
6	(China) Bian Ye (Italy) Edoardo Liberati	(Italy) No. 6 VSR	2	16	31	Ret	2	9	13	10	6	1	7	9	80
7	(Germany) Laurin Heinrich	(China) No. 4 Origine Motorsport	7	**1**					2	3			Ret	5	74
8	(Malaysia) Akash Neil Nandy (China) James Yu Kuai	(Hong Kong) No. 41 Audi Sport Asia Team Absolute	9	7	**2**	14	12	Ret	**10**	Ret	**1**	13	2	15	70
9	(Germany) Markus Winkelhock	(Hong Kong) No. 40 Audi Sport Asia Team Absolute	32	Ret	1	5	8	21	5	12	3	8	WD	WD	68
9	(China) Huang Ruohan	(Hong Kong) No. 40 Audi Sport Asia Team Absolute	32	Ret	1	5	8	21	5	12	3	8			68
10	(China) Cao Qi	(Hong Kong) No. 30 Craft-Bamboo Racing	11	2	18	12	9	2	27	9	Ret	23	6	3	63
11	(Germany) Luca Stolz	(Australia) No. 888 Triple Eight JMR			8	**22**	**Ret**	**4**			4	2			46
12	(Japan) "Hirobon" (Japan) Yu Kanamaru	(Japan) No. 500 Team 5ZIGEN	18	11	10	2	24	11	1	22	19	20	18	17	44
13	(China) Zhou Bihuang	(Italy) No. 63 VSR	13	20	20	13	3	8							44
13	(China) Zhou Bihuang	(China) No. 66 Climax Racing							18	**1**	21	26	11	14	44
14	(China) Wang Zhongwei	(China) No. 22 Climax Racing	14	5	13	23	17	5	20	24	Ret	7	Ret	**2**	44
15	(Canada) Daniel Morad	(Hong Kong) No. 30 Craft-Bamboo Racing	11	2					27	9			6	3	43
16	(Thailand) Vutthikorn Inthraphuvasak	(China) No. 93 AAS Phantom Global Racing	4	19	15	7	4	Ret	Ret	26	18	6	8	13	42
17	(Denmark) Bastian Buus	(China) No. 93 AAS Phantom Global Racing	4	19	15	7									40
17	(Denmark) Bastian Buus	(China) No. 4 Origine Motorsport									5	**4**			40
18	(China) Liang Jiatong	(China) No. 77 Harmony Racing	30	3	28	Ret	30†	6	21	14	17	14	**5**	8	37
19	(Andorra) Jules Gounon	(China) No. 22 Climax Racing					17	5							35
19	(Andorra) Jules Gounon	(China) No. 66 Climax Racing							18	**1**					35
20	(Estonia) Ralf Aron	(China) No. 22 Climax Racing	14	5	13	23			20	24	Ret	7	Ret	**2**	34
21	(France) Patrick Pilet	(China) No. 4 Origine Motorsport			14	1	15	7							31
22	(Sri Lanka) Eshan Pieris (Thailand) Tanart Sathienthirakul	(Hong Kong) No. 911 Absolute Racing	27	13	6	6	6	16	7	16	16	12	20	12	30
23	(France) Dorian Boccolacci (China) Chris Chia On	(China) No. 13 Phantom Global Racing									10	3	Ret	4	28
24	(Sweden) Joel Eriksson	(China) No. 13 Phantom Global Racing	15	15											24
24	(Sweden) Joel Eriksson	(China) No. 93 AAS Phantom Global Racing					4	Ret	Ret	26	18	6	8	13	24
25	(China) Luo Kailuo	(China) No. 77 Harmony Racing	30	3	28	Ret	30†	6	21	14			DNS	23	23
26	(Canada) Mikaël Grenier	(Australia) No. 888 Triple Eight JMR							3	6					23
27	(Germany) Maro Engel	(Hong Kong) No. 30 Craft-Bamboo Racing			18	12	9	2							20
28	(China) Ruan Cunfan	(China) No. 89 Team KRC	31	21	12	10	11	Ret	9	5	13	24	10	7	20
29	(Italy) Marco Mapelli	(Italy) No. 63 VSR	13	20	20	13	3	8							19
30	(Netherlands) Maxime Oosten	(China) No. 89 Team KRC					11	Ret	9	5	13	24	10	7	19
31	(Philippines) "André Canard" (Germany) Finn Gehrsitz	(Hong Kong) No. 296 Absolute Corse	19	14	11	8	22	14	4	25	12	25	Ret	Ret	16
32	(China) Chen Weian	(China) No. 77 Harmony Racing									15	14	**5**	8	14
33	(Australia) Jordan Love	(Australia) No. 888 Triple Eight JMR	10	4											13
34	(Japan) Hiroaki Nagai	(Japan) No. 18 Porsche Center Okazaki	16	10	Ret	25	19	15	6	15	9	18	15	30	11
34	(Japan) Yuta Kamimura	(Japan) No. 18 Porsche Center Okazaki	16	10	Ret	25			6	15	9	18	15	30	11
35	(Chinese Taipei) Jeffrey Lee	(Hong Kong) No. 88 Craft-Bamboo Racing	8	9	19	29	26	19	17	8	17	15	19	20	10
35	(Germany) Fabian Schiller	(Hong Kong) No. 88 Craft-Bamboo Racing	8	9					17	8	17	15			10
36	(Japan) Tomonobu Fujii (Japan) Satoshi Hoshino	(Japan) No. 777 D'station Racing	6	18	24	15	10	Ret	11	21	Ret	22			9
37	(Japan) Tsubasa Kondo (Japan) Kiyoshi Uchiyama	(Japan) No. 25 Porsche Center Okazaki	24	24	17	18	7	13	12	11	23	11			6
38	(Japan) Shigekazu Wakisaka	(Japan) No. 60 LM corsa	12	17	7	17	23	26	DNS	DNS	24	19			6
38	(Japan) Ryo Ogawa	(Japan) No. 60 LM corsa	12	17	7	17									6
39	(South Korea) Han Min-kwan	(South Korea) No. 44 Vollgas Motorsports	21	22	26	20	16	18	15	13	13	9	9	18	4
39	(South Korea) Kim Jae-hyun	(South Korea) No. 44 Vollgas Motorsports	21	22			16	18	15	13	13	9	9	18	4
40	(China) Min Heng	(China) No. 66 Climax Racing	17	31	9	11	20	Ret							2
40	(China) Min Heng	(China) No. 52 Climax Racing											22	21	2
41	(Australia) Jaylyn Robotham	(China) No. 66 Climax Racing	17	31	9	11	20	Ret							2
42	(New Zealand) Jono Lester	(China) No. 89 Team KRC	31	21	12	10									1
43	(China) Sun Jingzu	(China) No. 13 Phantom Global Racing	15	15	16	16	13	10	Ret	28†					1
43	(New Zealand) Jaxon Evans	(China) No. 13 Phantom Global Racing			16	16	13	10							1
—	(Australia) Andrew Macpherson (Australia) William Ben Porter	(Australia) No. 51 AMAC Motorsport	25	25	25	26	25	12	26	18	25	31	23	28	0
—	(Chinese Taipei) Brian Lee (Japan) Hideto Yasuoka	(Japan) No. 14 GTO Racing Team	DNS	30	27	19	14	20	22	17	22	21	14	19	0
—	(Japan) Akira Mizutani (Japan) Yuki Nemoto	(Japan) No. 563 ANR with VSR	28	26	23	21	31†	24	19	19	14	16	22	26	0
—	(Japan) Kiyoto Fujinami	(Japan) No. 18 Porsche Center Okazaki					19	15							0
—	(Indonesia) David Tjiptobiantoro	(Indonesia) No. 75 Garage 75	22	27	22	24	18	23	16	20	20	28	16	24	0
—	(Italy) Christian Colombo	(Indonesia) No. 75 Garage 75	22	27			18	23	16	20	20	28	16	24	0
—	(Japan) Mineki Okura	(Japan) No. 19 The Spirit of FFF Racing	23	23	21	Ret	21	17	23	Ret					0
—	(Japan) Hiroshi Hamaguchi	(Japan) No. 19 The Spirit of FFF Racing	23	23	21	Ret	21	17							0
—	(Hong Kong) Antares Au	(Hong Kong) No. 40 Audi Sport Asia Team Absolute											17	22	0
—	(Japan) Kei Nakanishi	(Japan) No. 60 LM corsa					23	26	DNS	DNS	24	19			0
—	(Australia) Jayden Ojeda	(Hong Kong) No. 88 Craft-Bamboo Racing					26	19							0
—	(Germany) Maximilian Götz	(Hong Kong) No. 88 Craft-Bamboo Racing			19	29							19	20	0
—	(Macau) Liu Lic Ka	(Macau) No. 3 Elegant Racing Team	20	Ret			29	27					24	Ret	0
—	(Macau) André Couto	(Macau) No. 3 Elegant Racing Team	20	Ret											0
—	(China) Hu Yuqi	(China) No. 66 Climax Racing									21	26	11	14	0
—	(Italy) Massimiliano Wiser	(Indonesia) No. 75 Garage 75			22	24									0
—	(Indonesia) Setiawan Santoso	(New Zealand) No. 8 EBM	29	28	30	28	28	22	25	23	27	30	25	29	0
—	(Japan) João Paulo de Oliveira	(Hong Kong) No. 30 Craft-Bamboo Racing									Ret	23			0
—	(China) Li Lichao	(China) No. 52 Climax Racing	26	29	32	30	27	25	Ret	Ret	28	27	21	21	0
—	(China) Liu Hangcheng	(China) No. 52 Climax Racing	26	29	32	30	27	25	Ret	Ret	28	27			0
—	(Chinese Taipei) Gavin Huang (Chinese Taipei) Johnson Huang	(Italy) No. 63 VSR									26	29			0
—	(United Kingdom) Douglas Bolger (Japan) Yudai Uchida	(Italy) No. 63 VSR							28	27					0
—	(Australia) Rodney Jane (Netherlands) Henk Kiks	(Thailand) No. 26 B-Quik Absolute Racing			29	27									0
—	(Hong Kong) Daniel Bilski (Singapore) Ethan Yang Brown	(Hong Kong) No. 63 VSR											Ret	27	0
—	(Germany) Timo Bernhard	(China) No. 13 Phantom Global Racing							Ret	28†					0
Guest drivers ineligible to score points
—	(China) Li Xuanyu (China) Lu Wenlong	(New Zealand) No. 321 EBM											12	25	—
—	(China) Hu Bo (Luxembourg) Dylan Pereira	(China) No. 2 Phantom Global Racing											13	16	—
—	(China) Liu Hangcheng	(China) No. 99 Harmony Racing											DNS	23	—
Pos.	Driver	Team	SEP (Malaysia)		BUR (Thailand)		FUJ (Japan)		SUZ (Japan)		OKA (Japan)		SHA (China)		Points

Colour	Result
Gold	Winner
Silver	Second place
Bronze	Third place
Green	Points classification
Blue	Non-points classification
Blue	Non-classified finish (NC)
Purple	Retired, not classified (Ret)
Red	Did not qualify (DNQ)
Red	Did not pre-qualify (DNPQ)
Black	Disqualified (DSQ)
White	Did not start (DNS)
White	Withdrew (WD)
White	Race cancelled (C)
Blank	Did not practice (DNP)
Blank	Did not arrive (DNA)
Blank	Excluded (EX)

**Bold** – Pole

Italics – Fastest Lap

Notes:

- † – Drivers did not finish the race, but were classified as they completed more than 90% of the race distance.

==== Pro-Am Cup ====
Pos.	Driver	Team	SEP (Malaysia)		BUR (Thailand)		FUJ (Japan)		SUZ (Japan)		OKA (Japan)		SHA (China)		Points
1	(China) Anthony Liu Xu (Belgium) Alessio Picariello	(Hong Kong) No. 1 Absolute Racing	3	6	2	2	4	1	4	2	5	9	**1**	5	173
2	(China) Lu Wei	(China) No. 4 Origine Motorsport	**5**	**1**	5	1	9	5	**1**	3	**3**	**4**	Ret	4	161
3	(China) Bian Ye (Italy) Edoardo Liberati	(Italy) No. 6 VSR	1	11	12	Ret	1	7	6	7	4	1	3	6	130
4	(Malaysia) Prince Abu Bakar Ibrahim	(Australia) No. 888 Triple Eight JMR	7	3	3	**9**	**Ret**	**3**	2	4	2	2	Ret	7	125
5	(China) Cao Qi	(Hong Kong) No. 30 Craft-Bamboo Racing	8	2	8	5	6	2	10	6	Ret	12	2	2	107
6	(Germany) Markus Winkelhock	(Hong Kong) No. 40 Audi Sport Asia Team Absolute	12	Ret	**1**	3	5	10	3	8	1	7	WD	WD	101
6	(China) Huang Ruohan	(Hong Kong) No. 40 Audi Sport Asia Team Absolute	12	Ret	**1**	3	5	10	3	8	1	7			101
7	(Germany) Laurin Heinrich	(China) No. 4 Origine Motorsport	**5**	**1**					**1**	3			Ret	4	87
8	(Thailand) Vutthikorn Inthraphuvasak	(China) No. 93 AAS Phantom Global Racing	2	9	6	4	3	Ret	Ret	11	8	5	4	8	85
9	(China) Wang Zhongwei	(China) No. 22 Climax Racing	10	4	4	10	10	4	9	10	Ret	6	Ret	**1**	75
10	(Germany) Luca Stolz	(Australia) No. 888 Triple Eight JMR			3	**9**	**Ret**	**3**			2	2			68
11	(China) Zhou Bihuang	(Italy) No. 63 VSR	9	10	10	6	2	6							67
11	(China) Zhou Bihuang	(China) No. 66 Climax Racing							8	**1**					
12	(Canada) Daniel Morad	(Hong Kong) No. 30 Craft-Bamboo Racing	8	2					10	6			2	2	67
13	(Denmark) Bastian Buus	(China) No. 93 AAS Phantom Global Racing	2	9	6	4									67
13	(Denmark) Bastian Buus	(China) No. 4 Origine Motorsport									**3**	**4**			67
14	(Estonia) Ralf Aron	(China) No. 22 Climax Racing	10	4	4	10			9	10	Ret	6	Ret	**1**	62
15	(Chinese Taipei) Jeffrey Lee	(Hong Kong) No. 88 Craft-Bamboo Racing	6	5	9	11	12	9	7	5	7	8	6	10	60
16	(Sweden) Joel Eriksson	(China) No. 13 Phantom Global Racing	11	7											51
16	(Sweden) Joel Eriksson	(China) No. 93 AAS Phantom Global Racing					3	Ret	Ret	11	8	5	4	8	51
17	(France) Patrick Pilet	(China) No. 4 Origine Motorsport			5	1	9	5							47
18	(Germany) Fabian Schiller	(Hong Kong) No. 88 Craft-Bamboo Racing	6	5					7	5	7	8			44
19	(Andorra) Jules Gounon	(China) No. 22 Climax Racing					10	4							42
19	(Andorra) Jules Gounon	(China) No. 66 Climax Racing							8	**1**					42
20	(Germany) Maro Engel	(Hong Kong) No. 30 Craft-Bamboo Racing			8	5	6	2							40
21	(Japan) Tomonobu Fujii (Japan) Satoshi Hoshino	(Japan) No. 777 D'station Racing	4	8	11	7	7	Ret	5	9	Ret	11			40
22	(Italy) Marco Mapelli	(Italy) No. 63 VSR	9	10	10	6	2	6							38
23	(France) Dorian Boccolacci (China) Chris Chia On	(China) No. 13 Phantom Global Racing									6	3	Ret	3	38
24	(Canada) Mikaël Grenier	(Australia) No. 888 Triple Eight JMR							2	4			Ret	7	36
25	(China) Sun Jingzu	(China) No. 13 Phantom Global Racing	11	7	7	8	8	8	Ret	12†					24
26	(Australia) Jordan Love	(Australia) No. 888 Triple Eight JMR	7	3											21
27	(New Zealand) Jaxon Evans	(China) No. 13 Phantom Global Racing			7	8	8	8							18
28	(Germany) Maximilian Götz	(Hong Kong) No. 88 Craft-Bamboo Racing			9	11							6	10	14
29	(Japan) Kei Nakanishi (Japan) Shigekazu Wakisaka	(Japan) No. 60 LM corsa					11	11	DNS	DNS	9	10			3
30	(Australia) Jayden Ojeda	(Hong Kong) No. 88 Craft-Bamboo Racing					12	9							2
—	(Germany) Timo Bernhard	(China) No. 13 Phantom Global Racing							Ret	12†					0
—	(Japan) João Paulo de Oliveira	(Hong Kong) No. 30 Craft-Bamboo Racing									Ret	12			0
Guest drivers ineligible to score points
—	(China) Hu Bo (Luxembourg) Dylan Pereira	(China) No. 2 Phantom Global Racing											5	9	—
Pos.	Driver	Team	SEP (Malaysia)		BUR (Thailand)		FUJ (Japan)		SUZ (Japan)		OKA (Japan)		SHA (China)		Points

==== Silver Cup ====
Pos.	Driver	Team	SEP (Malaysia)		BUR (Thailand)		FUJ (Japan)		SUZ (Japan)		OKA (Japan)		SHA (China)		Points
1	(China) Franky Cheng Congfu (Hong Kong) Adderly Fong	(Hong Kong) No. 36 FAW Audi Sport Asia Racing Team	**1**	3	2	2	**Ret**	1	3	1	2	1	2	**2**	220
2	(Sri Lanka) Eshan Pieris (Thailand) Tanart Sathienthirakul	(Hong Kong) No. 911 Absolute Racing	4	4	3	1	1	3	1	3	4	2	4	3	201
3	(Malaysia) Akash Neil Nandy (China) James Yu Kuai	(Hong Kong) No. 41 Audi Sport Asia Team Absolute	2	**2**	**1**	**3**	2	Ret	**2**	**Ret**	**1**	**3**	1	4	189
4	(China) Liang Jiatong	(China) No. 77 Harmony Racing	5	1	5	Ret	3†	**2**	4	2	3	4	**3**	1	175
5	(China) Luo Kailuo	(China) No. 77 Harmony Racing	5	1	5	Ret	3†	**2**	4	2					108
6	(China) Chen Weian	(China) No. 77 Harmony Racing									3	4	**3**	1	67
7	(Japan) Ryo Ogawa (Japan) Shigekazu Wakisaka	(Japan) No. 60 LM corsa	3	5	4	4									49
Pos.	Driver	Team	SEP (Malaysia)		BUR (Thailand)		FUJ (Japan)		SUZ (Japan)		OKA (Japan)		SHA (China)		Points

==== Silver-Am Cup ====
Pos.	Driver	Team	SEP (Malaysia)		BUR (Thailand)		FUJ (Japan)		SUZ (Japan)		OKA (Japan)		SHA (China)		Points
1	(China) Leo Ye Hongli (China) Yuan Bo	(China) No. 87 Origine Motorsport	**1**	**1**	1	2	**1**	Ret	**9**	1	**1**	2	**1**	1	238
2	(Japan) "Hirobon" (Japan) Yu Kanamaru	(Japan) No. 500 Team 5ZIGEN	4	3	3	**1**	9	1	1	8	7	6	7	3	160
3	(South Korea) Han Min-kwan	(South Korea) No. 44 Vollgas Motorsports	7	6	8	8	5	5	6	4	5	1	2	4	127
4	(China) Ruan Cunfan	(China) No. 89 Team KRC	11	5	5	4	3	Ret	4	2	4	8	3	2	126
5	(Japan) Hiroaki Nagai	(Japan) No. 18 Porsche Center Okazaki	2	2	Ret	10	6	4	3	5	2	5	6	10	124
6	(South Korea) Kim Jae-hyun	(South Korea) No. 44 Vollgas Motorsports	7	6			5	5	6	4	5	1	2	4	119
7	(Philippines) "André Canard" (Germany) Finn Gehrsitz	(Hong Kong) No. 296 Absolute Corse	5	4	4	3	8	3	2	**9**	3	**9**	Ret	**Ret**	105
8	(Japan) Tsubasa Kondo (Japan) Kiyoshi Uchiyama	(Japan) No. 25 Porsche Center Okazaki	8	7	6	6	2	2	5	3	9	3			104
9	(Japan) Yuta Kamimura	(Japan) No. 18 Porsche Center Okazaki	2	2	Ret	10			3	5	2	5	6	10	104
10	(Netherlands) Maxime Oosten	(China) No. 89 Team KRC					3	Ret	4	2	4	8	3	2	94
11	(Chinese Taipei) Brian Lee (Japan) Hideto Yasuoka	(Japan) No. 14 GTO Racing Team	DNS	10	9	7	4	6	8	6	8	7	5	5	73
12	(Japan) Akira Mizutani (Japan) Yuki Nemoto	(Japan) No. 563 ANR with VSR	10	8	7	9	10†	**7**	7	7	6	4	8	8	66
13	(China) Min Heng (Australia) Jaylyn Robotham	(China) No. 66 Climax Racing	3	11	**2**	5	7	Ret							49
14	(New Zealand) Jono Lester	(China) No. 89 Team KRC	11	5	5	4									32
15	(Japan) Kiyoto Fujinami	(Japan) No. 18 Porsche Center Okazaki					6	4							20
16	(Macau) André Couto (Macau) Liu Lic Ka	(Macau) No. 3 Elegant Racing Team	6	Ret											8
17	(Hong Kong) Daniel Bilski (Singapore) Ethan Yang Brown	(Hong Kong) No. 63 VSR											Ret	9	6
18	(China) Li Lichao (China) Liu Hangcheng	(China) No. 52 Climax Racing	9	9	10	11									5
19	(United Kingdom) Douglas Bolger (Japan) Yudai Uchida	(Italy) No. 63 VSR							10	10					2
20	(Chinese Taipei) Gavin Huang (Chinese Taipei) Johnson Huang	(Italy) No. 63 VSR									10	10			2
Guest drivers ineligible to score points
—	(China) Li Xuanyu (China) Lu Wenlong	(New Zealand) No. 321 EBM											4	7	—
—	(China) Liu Hangcheng (China) Luo Kailuo	(China) No. 99 Harmony Racing											DNS	6	—
Pos.	Driver	Team	SEP (Malaysia)		BUR (Thailand)		FUJ (Japan)		SUZ (Japan)		OKA (Japan)		SHA (China)		Points

==== Am Cup ====
Pos.	Driver	Team	SEP (Malaysia)		BUR (Thailand)		FUJ (Japan)		SUZ (Japan)		OKA (Japan)		SHA (China)		Points
1	(Indonesia) David Tjiptobiantoro	(Indonesia) No. 75 Garage 75	1	3	2	1	1	**4**	1	**2**	1	3	2	**4**	233
2	(Italy) Christian Colombo	(Indonesia) No. 75 Garage 75	1	3			1	**4**	1	**2**	1	3	2	**4**	190
3	(Australia) Andrew Macpherson (Australia) William Ben Porter	(Australia) No. 51 AMAC Motorsport	3	**2**	3	**2**	**3**	1	**4**	1	3	5	5	5	188
4	(Indonesia) Setiawan Santoso	(New Zealand) No. 8 EBM	4	4	5	4	5	3	3	3	4	4	7	6	139
5	(Japan) Mineki Okura	(Japan) No. 19 The Spirit of FFF Racing	**2**	1	**1**	Ret	2	2	2	Ret					122
6	(Japan) Hiroshi Hamaguchi	(Japan) No. 19 The Spirit of FFF Racing	**2**	1	**1**	Ret	2	2							104
7	(China) Hu Yuqi (China) Zhou Bihuang	(China) No. 66 Climax Racing									**2**	**1**	**1**	1	93
8	(China) Li Lichao	(China) No. 52 Climax Racing					4	5	Ret	Ret	5	2	4	2	80
9	(China) Liu Hangcheng	(China) No. 52 Climax Racing					4	5	Ret	Ret	5	2			50
10	(Italy) Massimiliano Wiser	(Indonesia) No. 75 Garage 75			2	1									43
11	(China) Min Heng	(China) No. 52 Climax Racing											4	2	30
12	(Hong Kong) Antares Au	(Hong Kong) No. 40 Audi Sport Asia Team Absolute											3	3	30
13	(Australia) Rodney Jane (Netherlands) Henk Kiks	(Thailand) No. 26 B-Quik Absolute Racing			4	3									27
14	(Macau) Liu Lic Ka	(Macau) No. 3 Elegant Racing Team					6	6					6	Ret	24
Pos.	Driver	Team	SEP (Malaysia)		BUR (Thailand)		FUJ (Japan)		SUZ (Japan)		OKA (Japan)		SHA (China)		Points

==== China Cup ====
Pos.	Driver	Team	SEP (Malaysia)		BUR (Thailand)		FUJ (Japan)		SUZ (Japan)		OKA (Japan)		SHA (China)		Points
1	(China) Franky Cheng Congfu (Hong Kong) Adderly Fong	(Hong Kong) No. 36 FAW Audi Sport Asia Racing Team	1	3	1	2	Ret	1	1	2	2	1	1	3	234
2	(China) Leo Ye Hongli (China) Yuan Bo	(China) No. 87 Origine Motorsport	2	2	2	1	1	Ret	3	1	1	2	2	1	233
3	(China) Liang Jiatong	(China) No. 77 Harmony Racing	5	1	3	Ret	4	2	2	3	3	3	3	2	173
4	(China) Li Lichao	(China) No. 52 Climax Racing	4	4	4	3	2	3	Ret	Ret	5	5	6	5	124
5	(China) Luo Kailuo	(China) No. 77 Harmony Racing	5	1	3	Ret	4	2	2	3					110
6	(China) Liu Hangcheng	(China) No. 52 Climax Racing	4	4	4	3	2	3	Ret	Ret	5	5			104
7	(China) Chen Weian	(China) No. 77 Harmony Racing									3	3	3	2	63
8	(Macau) Liu Lic Ka	(Macau) No. 3 Elegant Racing Team	3	Ret			4	4					7	Ret	50
9	(China) Hu Yuqi (China) Zhou Bihuang	(China) No. 66 Climax Racing									4	4	4	4	48
10	(China) Min Heng	(China) No. 52 Climax Racing											6	5	18
12	(Macau) André Couto	(Macau) No. 3 Elegant Racing Team	3	Ret											15
Guest drivers ineligible to score points
—	(China) Li Xuanyu (China) Lu Wenlong	(New Zealand) No. 321 EBM											5	7	—
—	(China) Liu Hangcheng (China) Luo Kailuo	(China) No. 99 Harmony Racing											DNS	6	—
Pos.	Driver	Team	SEP (Malaysia)		BUR (Thailand)		FUJ (Japan)		SUZ (Japan)		OKA (Japan)		SHA (China)		Points

=== Teams' Championship ===
Pos.	Team	SEP (Malaysia)		BUR (Thailand)		FUJ (Japan)		SUZ (Japan)		OKA (Japan)		SHA (China)		Points
1	(China) Origine Motorsport	3	1	5	1	1	7	2	3	2	4	4	1	265
1	(China) Origine Motorsport	7	6	14	4	15	Ret	24	4	5	10	Ret	5	265
2	(Hong Kong) Absolute Racing	5	12	4	3	5	1	7	2	8	12	2	6	161
2	(Hong Kong) Absolute Racing	27	13	6	6	6	16	8	16	16	17	20	12	161
3	(Hong Kong) Audi Sport Asia Team Absolute	9	7	1	5	8	21	5	12	1	8	2	15	138
3	(Hong Kong) Audi Sport Asia Team Absolute	32	Ret	2	14	12	Ret	10	Ret	3	13	17	22	138
4	(Italy) VSR	2	16	20	13	2	8	13	10	6	1	7	9	99
4	(Italy) VSR	13	20	31	Ret	3	9	28	27	26	29	Ret	27	99
5	(Hong Kong) FAW Audi Sport Asia Racing Team	1	8	3	9	Ret	3	14	7	7	5	3	16	98
6	(Australia) Triple Eight JMR	10	4	8	22	Ret	4	3	5	4	2	Ret	10	83
7	(Hong Kong) Craft-Bamboo Racing	8	2	18	12	9	2	17	8	17	15	6	3	73
7	(Hong Kong) Craft-Bamboo Racing	11	9	19	29	26	19	27	9	Ret	23	19	20	73
8	(China) Phantom Global Racing AAS Phantom Global Racing	4	15	15	7	4	10	Ret	24	10	3	8	4	71
8	(China) Phantom Global Racing AAS Phantom Global Racing	15	19	16	16	13	Ret	Ret	Ret	18	6	Ret	13	71
9	(China) Climax Racing	14	5	9	11	17	5	18	1	21	7	11	2	71
9	(China) Climax Racing	17	29	13	23	20	25	20	24	28	26	21	14	71
10	(Japan) Team 5ZIGEN	18	11	10	2	24	11	1	22	19	20	18	17	44
11	(China) Harmony Racing	30	3	28	Ret	30†	6	21	14	17	14	5	8	37
12	(China) Team KRC	31	21	12	10	11	Ret	9	6	13	24	10	7	20
13	(Japan) Porsche Center Okazaki	16	10	17	18	7	13	6	11	9	11	15	30	17
13	(Japan) Porsche Center Okazaki	24	24	Ret	25	19	15	12	15	23	18			17
14	(Hong Kong) Absolute Corse	19	14	11	8	22	14	4	25	12	25	Ret	Ret	16
15	(Japan) D'station Racing	6	18	24	15	10	Ret	11	21	Ret	22			9
16	(Japan) LM corsa	12	17	7	17	23	26	DNS	DNS	24	19			6
17	(South Korea) Vollgas Motorsports	21	22	26	20	16	18	15	13	13	9	9	18	4
—	(Australia) AMAC Motorsport	25	25	25	26	25	12	26	18	25	31	23	28	0
—	(Japan) ANR with VSR	28	26	23	21	31†	24	19	19	14	16	22	26	0
—	(Japan) GTO Racing Team	DNS	30	27	19	14	20	22	17	22	21	14	19	0
—	(Indonesia) Garage 75	22	27	22	24	18	23	16	20	20	28	16	24	0
—	(Japan) The Spirit of FFF Racing	23	23	21	Ret	21	17	23	Ret					0
—	(Macau) Elegant Racing Team	20	Ret			29	27					24	Ret	0
—	(New Zealand) EBM	29	28	30	28	28	22	25	23	27	30	25	25	0
—	(Thailand) B-Quik Absolute Racing			29	27									0
Pos.	Team	SEP (Malaysia)		BUR (Thailand)		FUJ (Japan)		SUZ (Japan)		OKA (Japan)		SHA (China)		Points

== See also ==
- 2024 British GT Championship
- 2024 GT World Challenge Europe
- 2024 GT World Challenge Europe Endurance Cup
- 2024 GT World Challenge Europe Sprint Cup
- 2024 GT World Challenge America
- 2024 GT World Challenge Australia
- 2024 Intercontinental GT Challenge
