= 2022 Porsche Carrera Cup Asia =

Motorsport racing season

The 2022 Porsche Carrera Cup Asia was the nineteenth season of the Porsche Carrera Cup Asia. The season commenced on July 29 at the Zhuzhou International Circuit and finished at the same circuit on October 30.

As with the 2021 season, the championship was hindered by the effects of the global COVID-19 pandemic. As a result, the championship once again took place solely within mainland China with no international stops on the calendar. A planned round as part of the Singapore Grand Prix failed to materialize. The calendar had condensed from eight rounds to four, with three of them being held at the Zhuzhou International Circuit. The championship would not commence until the end of July; a much later starting date than previous iterations of the series.

The championship was dominated by Ye Hongli who claimed six wins from eight races, securing the title before the final round. Lü Wei won the Pro-Am championship, Henry Kwong claimed the Am championship and JUNJIE Racing secured the Dealer Trophy.

== Calendar ==
Each round hosted at least one round of the 2022 championship.

Round	Circuit	Date	Supporting
1	Zhuzhou International Circuit, Hunan, China	29–31 July	TCR Asia Series; China Touring Car Championship
2	V1 Auto World Tianjin, Tianjin, China	26–28 August	Porsche Sports Cup China
3	Zhuzhou International Circuit, Hunan, China	23–25 September	China Endurance Championship
4	Zhuzhou International Circuit, Hunan, China	28–30 October	Stand-alone event

=== Cancelled events ===
The following events were initially scheduled for the 2022 season but were ultimately cancelled.

Circuit	Date	Supporting
Ningbo International Circuit, Zhejiang, China	5–7 August	China Endurance Championship
Marina Bay Street Circuit, Marina Bay, Singapore	30 September–2 October	Singapore Grand Prix; W Series
Ningbo International Circuit, Zhejiang, China	14–16 October	China Endurance Championship
Zhuhai International Circuit, Zhuhai, China	28–30 October	Porsche Sports Cup China
Shanghai International Circuit, Shanghai, China	28–30 October	Porsche Sports Cup China; Formula Renault Super Challenge

== Teams and drivers ==
All entrants utilized the Porsche 911 GT3 Cup (Type 992).

Team	No.	Driver	Class	Rounds
(China) Porsche Beijing Central & Goldenport	2	(China) Zhou Bihuang	PA	1–3
(China) Team Shanghai Yonda	3	(China) Bian Ye	P	All
(China) Team Shanghai Yonda	6	(China) Bao Jinlong	PA	All
(China) R&B Racing	4	(China) Lü Wei	PA	All
(China) Climax Racing	7	(Chinese Taipei) Tang Ruobin	Am	1–3
(China) Climax Racing	12	(China) Wang Zhongwei	PA	1–3
(China) Team BetterLife	9	(China) Li Chao	PA	All
(China) Team C&D	17	(China) Hong Shijie	PA	All
(China) Meidong Racing	20	(China) Daniel Lu Wenlong	P	All
(Hong Kong) Modena Motorsport	21	(Hong Kong) Francis Tjia	PA	1–2
(China) BD Group	22	(China) Ling Kang	P	All
(Hong Kong) KiddyWorld Racing	23	(Hong Kong) Eric Kwong	Am	All
(Hong Kong) Team Jebsen	55	(China) Gao Yujia	P	All
(China) Team KRC	65	(Chinese Taipei) Brian Lee	Am	4
(China) Team KRC	65	(China) Zhu Zhiyao	Am	1–3
(China) TORO Racing	66	(China) Min Heng	PA	All
(China) TORO Racing	99	(China) Luo Kailuo	P	All
(China) Shanghai Pudong & Waigaoqiao	69	(Chinese Taipei) Jacky Wu	Am	All
(Germany) Team Porsche Holding	86	(China) Cui Yue	P	All
(Hong Kong) Triple Ace Racing	91	(Hong Kong) Henry Kwong	Am	All
(China) HEHEHE Racing	233	(China) Zhang Zhendong	P	All
(China) Zheng Tong Auto	718	(China) Yuan Bo	P	All
(China) JUNJIE Racing	777	(China) Ye Hongli	P	All

Icon	Class
P	Pro Cup
PA	Pro-Am Cup
Am	Am Cup
	Guest Starter

== Results ==
Round		Circuit	Pole Position	Fastest Lap	Winning Driver	Winning Team	Pro-Am Winner	Am Winner
1	R1	Zhuzhou 1	(China) Ye Hongli	(China) Ye Hongli	(China) Ye Hongli	(China) JUNJIE Racing	(China) Zhou Bihuang	(Chinese Taipei) Tang Ruobin
1	R2	Zhuzhou 1	(China) Ye Hongli	(China) Ye Hongli	(China) Ye Hongli	(China) JUNJIE Racing	(China) Lü Wei	(Hong Kong) Eric Kwong
2	R1	Tianjin	(China) Ye Hongli	(China) Ye Hongli	(China) Ye Hongli	(China) JUNJIE Racing	(China) Lü Wei	(Hong Kong) Henry Kwong
2	R2	Tianjin	(China) Ye Hongli	(China) Ling Kang	(China) Ye Hongli	(China) JUNJIE Racing	(China) Lü Wei	(Hong Kong) Henry Kwong
3	R1	Zhuzhou 2	(China) Ye Hongli	(China) Ye Hongli	(China) Ye Hongli	(China) JUNJIE Racing	(China) Hong Shijie	(Hong Kong) Henry Kwong
3	R2	Zhuzhou 2	(China) Ye Hongli	(China) Ye Hongli	(China) Ye Hongli	(China) JUNJIE Racing	(China) Lü Wei	(Hong Kong) Henry Kwong
4	R1	Zhuzhou 3	(China) Luo Kailuo	(China) Luo Kailuo	(China) Luo Kailuo	(China) TORO Racing	(China) Lü Wei	(Hong Kong) Henry Kwong
4	R2	Zhuzhou 3	(China) Luo Kailuo	(China) Ye Hongli	(China) Luo Kailuo	(China) TORO Racing	(China) Min Heng	(Hong Kong) Eric Kwong

== Championship standings ==
=== Scoring system ===
Points were awarded to the top fifteen classified drivers in every race, using the following system:

Position	1st	2nd	3rd	4th	5th	6th	7th	8th	9th	10th	11th	12th	13th	14th	15th	Pole	FL
Points	25	20	17	14	12	10	9	8	7	6	5	4	3	2	1	1	1

=== Overall ===
Pos.	Driver	ZHO1 (China)		TIA (China)		ZHO2 (China)		ZHO3 (China)		Points
Pos.	Driver	R1	R2	R3	R4	R5	R6	R7	R8	Points
1	(China) Ye Hongli	1	1	1	1	1	1	2	7	188
2	(China) Luo Kailuo	3	3	5	7	3	3	1	1	137
3	(China) Ling Kang	2	4	3	5	2	2	5	2	132
4	(China) Zhang Zhendong	19	7	13	4	5	4	3	3	87
5	(China) Lü Wei	8	5	7	3	Ret	5	4	6	83
6	(China) Yuan Bo	5	6	6	Ret	4	7	8	8	74
7	(China) Daniel Lu Wenlong	4	2	2	13	Ret	6	Ret	9	72
8	(China) Bao Jinlong	9	9	8	6	12	8	6	5	70
9	(China) Cui Yue	6	8	4	2	Ret	DNS	Ret	DNS	52
10	(China) Min Heng	10	13	9	Ret	Ret	9	7	4	47
11	(China) Zhou Bihuang	7	10	Ret	9	7	11			36
12	(China) Gao Yujia	11	12	11	8	8	12	16	11	35
13	(China) Bian Ye	14	11	10	11	Ret	10	9	10	35
14	(China) Hong Shijie	12	17	12	Ret	6	13	15	12	27
15	(Hong Kong) Henry Kwong	Ret	18	14	10	9	15	11	14	25
16	(Hong Kong) Eric Kwong	21	14	15	14	11	16	12	13	19
17	(China) Li Chao	15	15	DNS	Ret	10	14	10	DNS	15
18	(Chinese Taipei) Tang Ruobin	17	20	16	12	13	17			9
19	(Hong Kong) Francis Tjia	13	16	18	21					3
20	(Chinese Taipei) Jacky Wu	20	21	19	16	16	18	13	16	3
21	(China) Wang Zhongwei	16	19	17	15	14	19			3
22	(Chinese Taipei) Brian Lee							14	15	3
23	(China) Zhu Zhiyao	18	22	20	17	15	Ret			1
Pos.	Driver	R1	R2	R3	R4	R5	R6	R7	R8	Points
Pos.	Driver	ZHO1 (China)		TIA (China)		ZHO2 (China)		ZHO3 (China)		Points

== See also ==
- 2022 Porsche Supercup
- 2022 Porsche Carrera Cup Australia
- 2022 Porsche Carrera Cup Great Britain
