= Kerong Li =

Chinese racing driver (born 2001)

Kerong Li 李科蓉
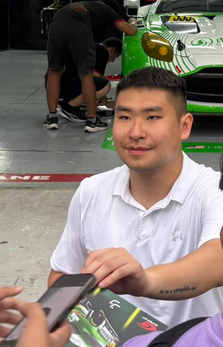
- Li at the 2025 Super GT Malaysia Festival
- Nationality: (China) Chinese
- Born: 3 August 2001 (age 25) Xi'an, China
- Categorisation: FIA Silver

Championship titles
- 2026 2022: Intercontinental GT Challenge – Independent Cup; 24H GT Series – GTX

Kerong Li (Chinese: 李科蓉; pinyin: Lǐ Kēróng; born 3 August 2001 in Xi'an) is a Chinese racing driver who last competed for High Class Racing in the Intercontinental GT Challenge.

== Career ==
Li made his single-seater debut in 2021, racing in the Formula Race Promotions Eastern Pro 4 Challenge for Jensen Global Advisors. After finishing third in the aforementioned series, Li raced part-time in both the Formula Pro USA F4 Championship and the Formula 4 United States Championships. At the end of the year, Li joined NTE Sport in the season-ending round of the Michelin Pilot Challenge at Road Atlanta alongside Jean-Francois Brunot in the Grand Sport class.

Moving to GT racing full-time in 2022, Li primarily competed in Lamborghini Super Trofeo Europe for Leipert Motorsport alongside Brunot in the Pro-Am class. Scoring 23 points across the twelve-race season, Li finished 14th in the Pro-Am standings at season's end. Also in the same year, Li drove the first round of the 24H GT Series for the same team, finishing fifth in his only outing in the GT3 Pro class. Competing in the GTX class for most of the remaining races, which included a one-off outing for HRT Performance at Mugello, Li scored a podium in every race he contested and won the season-ending round at Barcelona to clinch the GTX title in the 24H GT Series European Championship.

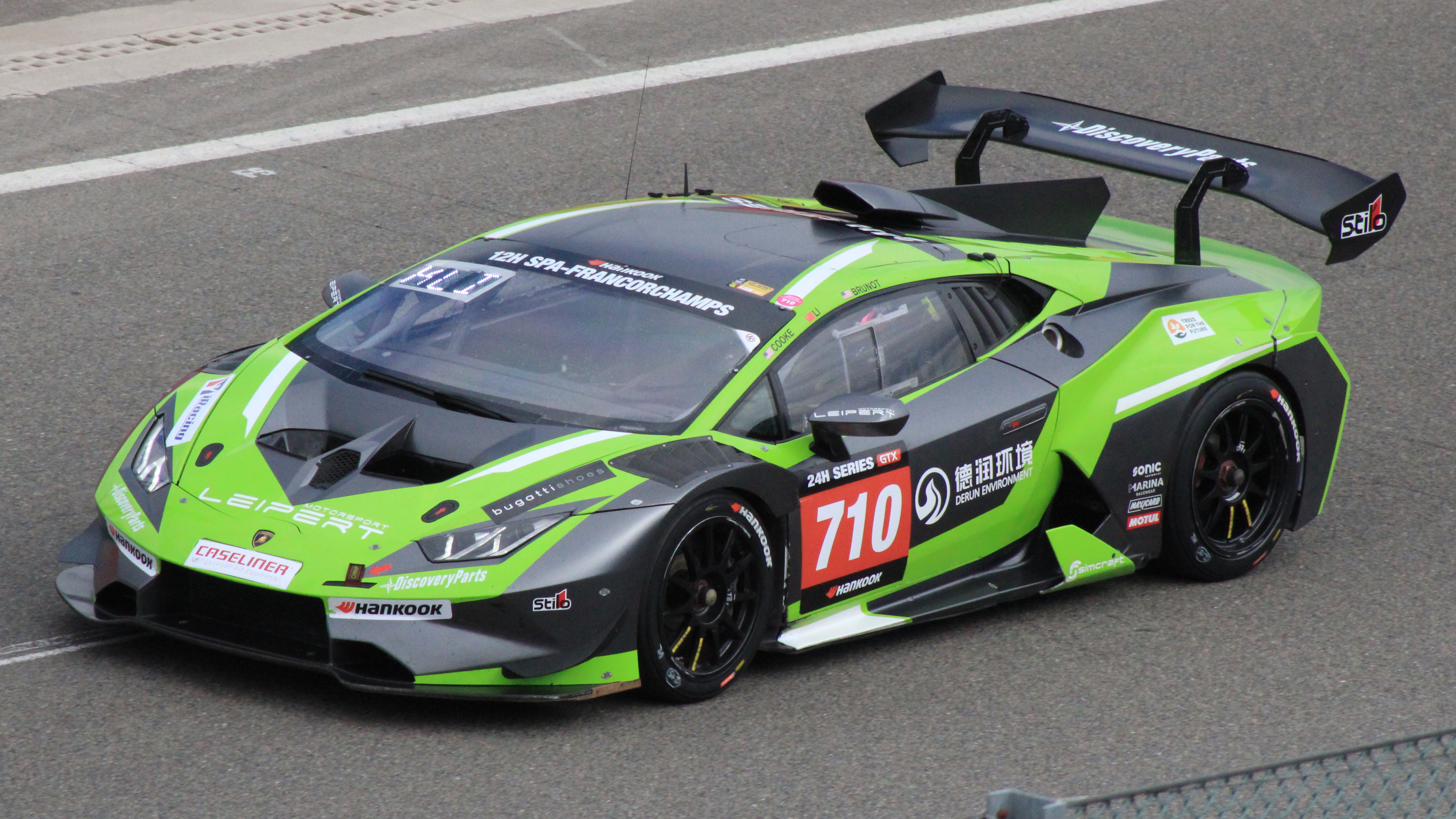
Li in 2022

In 2023, Li returned to NTE Sport to make his debut in the 24 Hours of Daytona alongside Jaden Conwright, Alessio Deledda and Robert Megennis. In the race, Li retired due to a damaged fuel tank, which was the result of Megennis' crash at Turn 1 just after the one hour mark. For the rest of the season, Li returned to Leipert Motorsport to race in the Am class of Lamborghini Super Trofeo Europe alongside Brunot. Scoring a lone class podium at Paul Ricard and finished 11th in the Am standings at season's end. During 2023, Li also competed for the same team in two rounds of the GT World Challenge Europe Endurance Cup. After finishing 36th at Paul Ricard, Li retired from the 24 Hours of Spa after spinning and being collected by Yannick Mettler just after the ten hour mark. After making a one-off appearance in Porsche Carrera Cup Asia for Earl Bamber Motorsport, Li stayed with the team to compete in the 2023–24 Asian Le Mans Series, racing in the GT class alongside Bamber and Adrian D'Silva. In the five-race season, Li scored a best result of 12th at Sepang and ended the winter 31st in the GT points.

Moving back to the United States for 2024, Li joined MDK Motorsports to compete in the GTD class of the IMSA SportsCar Championship alongside Anders Fjordbach. Alongside endurance rounds-only driver Klaus Bachler, Li scored his best result of the season of eighth at Watkins Glen, on his way to 13th in the GTD standings. Li also raced in the 24 Hours of Spa for Earl Bamber Motorsport alongside Bamber, Brendon Leitch and D'Silva.

Li moved to Asia for 2025, joining Origine Motorsport in the team's sole Silver-Am lineup alongside Fjordbach. In his rookie year in the series, Li scored a lone class win in race two at Fuji en route to a fifth-place points finish. During 2025, Li returned to EBM Giga Racing to make his debut in the GT300 class of Super GT alongside Jazeman Jaafar at Sepang. The following year, Li joined High Class Racing to contest the full Intercontinental GT Challenge season. At the Bathurst 12 Hour, Li finished second overall and won in the Bronze class alongside Anders Fjordbach and Dorian Boccolacci, which was the highlight of his IGTC season, in which he clinched the Independent Cup title with a race to spare.

== Racing record ==
=== Racing career summary ===
Season	Series	Team	Races	Wins	Poles	F/Laps	Podiums	Points	Position
2021	FRP Eastern Pro 4 Challenge	Jensen Global Advisors	4	0	0	0	3	145	**3rd**
2021	Formula Pro USA F4 Championship	Jensen Global Advisors	2	0	0	0	0	18	11th
2021	Formula 4 United States Championship	Jensen Global Advisors	4	0	0	0	0	0	36th
2021	Michelin Pilot Challenge – GS	NTE Sport	1	0	0	0	0	200	53rd
2022	24H GT Series – GT3 Pro	Leipert Motorsport	1	0	0	0	0	1	NC
2022	Lamborghini Super Trofeo Europe – Pro-Am	Leipert Motorsport	12	0	0	0	0	23	14th
2022	24H GT Series – GTX	Leipert Motorsport	4	2	0	0	4	86	**1st**
2022	24H GT Series – GTX	HRT Performance	1	1	0	0	1	86	**1st**
2022–23	Middle East Trophy – GTX	Leipert Motorsport	1	1	0	0	1	40	NC
2023	IMSA SportsCar Championship – GTD	NTE Sport	1	0	0	0	0	120	69th
2023	Lamborghini Super Trofeo Europe – Am	Leipert Motorsport	10	0	0	0	1	38	11th
2023	24H GT Series – GT3 Am	Leipert Motorsport	1	0	0	0	0	20	NC
2023	Lamborghini Super Trofeo World Final – Am	Leipert Motorsport	2	0	0	0	0	4	10th
2023	GT World Challenge Europe Endurance Cup	Leipert Motorsport	1	0	0	0	0	0	NC
2023	GT World Challenge Europe Endurance Cup	CrowdStrike Racing by Leipert Motorsport	1	0	0	0	0	0	NC
2023	GT World Challenge Europe Endurance Cup – Silver	Leipert Motorsport	1	0	0	0	0	6	20th
2023	GT World Challenge Europe Endurance Cup – Pro-Am	CrowdStrike Racing by Leipert Motorsport	1	0	0	0	0	1	22nd
2023	Porsche Carrera Cup Asia – Am	EBM Giga Racing	2	0	0	0	0	16	14th
2023–24	Asian Le Mans Series – GT	Earl Bamber Motorsport	5	0	0	0	0	0	31st
2024	IMSA SportsCar Championship – GTD	MDK Motorsports	10	0	0	0	0	2129	13th
2024	GT World Challenge Europe Endurance Cup	Earl Bamber Motorsport	1	0	0	0	0	0	NC
2024	Intercontinental GT Challenge	Earl Bamber Motorsport	1	0	0	0	0	0	NC
2025	GT World Challenge Asia	Origine Motorsport	11	0	0	0	0	11	33rd
2025	GT World Challenge Asia – Silver-Am	Origine Motorsport	11	1	1	0	3	107	5th
2025	Super GT – GT300	EBM Giga Racing	1	0	0	0	0	0	NC†
2025	Porsche Carrera Cup Asia	Team Porsche New Zealand	2	0	0	0	0	0	NC†
2025–26	24H Series Middle East - GT3	EBM	1	0	0	0	0	18	NC
2026	Intercontinental GT Challenge – Independent Cup	High Class Racing	5	3	0	0	5	111	**1st**
2026	Nürburgring Langstrecken-Serie – SP9 Pro-Am	High Class Racing	1	0	0	0	0	4	NC
2026	24 Hours of Nürburgring – SP9 Pro-Am	High Class Racing	1	0	0	0	0	—N/a	6th
2026	GT World Challenge Europe Endurance Cup	High Class Racing	1	0	0	0	0	0	NC
2026	GT World Challenge America – Pro-Am	High Class Racing	1	0	0	0	0	0	NC†
2026	Nürburgring Langstrecken-Serie – SP10 Pro-Am	SRS Team Sorg Rennsport	1	0	0	0	0	1	NC
2026	Porsche Carrera Cup Asia – Pro-Am	OpenRoad Racing	2	0	0	0	0	0	NC†
2026	Porsche Carrera Cup Asia – Pro-Am	Origine Motorsport	2	0	0	0	0	0	NC†
2026	China GT Championship – GTS	Phantom Global Racing							
2026	China GT Championship – GTS Pro-Am	Phantom Global Racing							
2026	GT World Challenge Asia	Absolute Racing	2	0	0	0	0	8	34th
2026	GT World Challenge Asia – Pro-Am	Absolute Racing	2	0	0	0	1	23	23rd
2026	China GT Championship – GT3	Absolute Racing							
2026	China GT Championship – GT3 Am	Absolute Racing							

=== Complete Formula 4 United States Championship results ===
(key) (Races in bold indicate pole position) (Races in italics indicate fastest lap)

Year	Team	1	2	3	4	5	6	7	8	9	10	11	12	13	14	15	16	17	Pos	Points
2021	Jensen Global Advisors	ATL; 1	ATL; 2	ATL; 3	ROA; 1	ROA; 2	ROA; 3	MOH; 1	MOH; 2	MOH; 3	BRA; 1	BRA; 2	BRA; 3	VIR; 1; 19	VIR; 2; 21	VIR; 3 DNS	COA; 1; 25	COA; 2; 26	36th	0

=== Complete GT World Challenge Europe results ===
==== GT World Challenge Europe Endurance Cup ====
(Races in bold indicate pole position) (Races in italics indicate fastest lap)

Year	Team	Car	Class	1	2	3	4	5	6	7	Pos.	Points
2023	Leipert Motorsport	Lamborghini Huracán GT3 Evo	Silver	MNZ	LEC; 36						20th	6
2023	Crowdstrike Racing by Leipert Motorsport	Lamborghini Huracán GT3 Evo 2	Pro-Am			SPA; 6H; 68	SPA; 12H; 64†	SPA; 24H; Ret	NÜR	CAT	22nd	1
2024	Earl Bamber Motorsport	Porsche 911 GT3 R (992)	Pro-Am	LEC	SPA; 6H; Ret	SPA; 12H; Ret	SPA; 24H; Ret	NÜR	MNZ	JED	NC	0
2026	High Class Racing	Porsche 911 GT3 R (992.2)	Pro-Am	LEC	MNZ	SPA; 6H; 46	SPA; 12H; 39	SPA; 24H; 32	NÜR	ALG	NC	0

=== Complete IMSA SportsCar Championship results ===
(key) (Races in bold indicate pole position; races in italics indicate fastest lap)

Year	Entrant	Class	Make	Engine	1	2	3	4	5	6	7	8	9	10	11	Rank	Points
2023	NTE Sport	GTD	Lamborghini Huracán GT3 Evo 2	Lamborghini 5.2 L V10	DAY; 20	SEB	LBH	LGA	WGL	MOS	LIM	ELK	VIR	IMS	PET	69th	120
2024	MDK Motorsports	GTD	Porsche 911 GT3 R (992)	Porsche 4.2 L Flat-6	DAY; 12	SEB; 12	LBH; 13	LGA; 13	WGL; 8	MOS; 10	ELK; 10	VIR; 10	IMS; 12	PET; 15		2129	13th

=== Complete Asian Le Mans Series results ===
(key) (Races in bold indicate pole position) (Races in italics indicate fastest lap)

Year	Team	Class	Car	Engine	1	2	3	4	5	Pos.	Points
2023–24	Earl Bamber Motorsport	GT	Porsche 911 GT3 R (992)	Porsche M97/80 4.2 L Flat-6	SEP; 1; 12	SEP; 2; 14	DUB; 15	ABU; 1; 17	ABU; 2; 17	31st	0

=== Complete GT World Challenge Asia results ===
(key) (Races in bold indicate pole position) (Races in italics indicate fastest lap)

Year	Team	Car	Class	1	2	3	4	5	6	7	8	9	10	11	12	DC	Points
2025	Origine Motorsport	Porsche 911 GT3 R (992)	Silver-Am	SEP; 1; 7	SEP; 2; 7	MAN; 1; 2	MAN; 2 Ret	BUR; 1; 6	BUR; 2; 5	FUJ; 1; 6	FUJ; 2; 1	OKA; 1; 2	OKA; 2; 6	BEI; 1 Ret	**BEI**; **2** DNS	5th	107
2026	Absolute Racing	Porsche 911 GT3 R (992)	Pro-Am	SEP; 1	SEP; 2	MAN; 1	MAN; 2	FUJ; 1	FUJ; 2	OKA; 1	OKA; 2	BEI; 1; 6	BEI; 2; 3	SHA; 1	SHA; 2	23rd	23

=== Complete Super GT results ===
(key) (Races in bold indicate pole position; races in italics indicate fastest lap)

Year	Team	Car	Class	1	2	3	4	5	6	7	8	9	DC	Points
2025	EBM GIGA Racing	Aston Martin Vantage AMR GT3 Evo	GT300	OKA	FUJ	SEP; 19	FS1	FS2	SUZ	SUG	AUT	MOT	NC	0
