= 2023 Superrace Championship =

South Korean motor race series

The 2023 Superrace Championship (also known as the 2023 CJ Logistics Superrace Championship) was a South Korean motor racing series for stock cars, production cars, prototypes and production bikes. It is the 18th season running for the championship and the 17th season both partnered by CJ Group and raced under the moniker 'Superrace Championship'. The championship is contested individually between 5 classes; Super 6000, Kumho GT (GT1 & GT2), BMW M Class, Sports Prototype (Radical) Cup Korea & the newly introduced Kawasaki Ninja Cup. There have been no announcements for a continuation of the Cadillac CT4 category.

== Calendar ==
Round	Event	Circuit	Location	Dates	Map
1	Super Exciting Superrace	Everland Speedway	Yongin-si, Gyeonggi-do	22 April	2023 Superrace Championship is located in South Korea
2	Super Exciting Superrace	Everland Speedway	Yongin-si, Gyeonggi-do	23 April	2023 Superrace Championship is located in South Korea
3	Asia Motorsports Carnival	Korea International Circuit	Yeongam-gun, Jeollanam-do	4 June	2023 Superrace Championship is located in South Korea
4	Inje Night Race	Inje Speedium	Inje-gun, Gangwon-do	8 July	2023 Superrace Championship is located in South Korea
5	Summer Festival	Everland Speedway	Yongin-si, Gyeonggi-do	19–20 August	2023 Superrace Championship is located in South Korea
6	Jeonnam GT	Korea International Circuit	Yeongam-gun, Jeollanam-do	23–24 September	2023 Superrace Championship is located in South Korea
7	Final Battle	Everland Speedway	Yongin-si, Gyeonggi-do	4 November	2023 Superrace Championship is located in South Korea
8	Final Battle	Everland Speedway	Yongin-si, Gyeonggi-do	5 November	2023 Superrace Championship is located in South Korea

== Teams and drivers ==
=== Super 6000 ===
Since 2020, all teams are currently using the Toyota GR Supra powered with a General Motors 6.2L LS3 V8 engine capable of producing 460 horsepower.

Key
Regular driver
Wildcard driver
Replacement driver

Team	No.	Driver(s)	Tyre	Rounds
AMC Racing	03	(Japan) Takayuki Aoki	KU	1-2, 6
AMC Racing	99	(South Korea) "Tony" Seo Seok-hyun	KU	1-3, 5, 7-8
AMC Racing	27	(Netherlands) Carlo van Dam	KU	3-5
AMC Racing	78	(South Korea) Jung Kyung Hun	KU	6-8
Brand New Racing	38	(South Korea) Park Gyu-seung	KU	All
Brand New Racing	87	(South Korea) Lee Hyo-jun	KU	All
CJ Logistics Racing	36	(South Korea) Park Jun-seo	NEX	All
CJ Logistics Racing	50	(South Korea) Oh Han-sol	NEX	All
ECSTA Racing	18	(South Korea) Lee Chan-joon	KU	All
ECSTA Racing	24	(South Korea) Lee Chang-uk	KU	All
ECSTA Racing	55	(Japan) Hiroki Yoshida	KU	1-2
ECSTA Racing	88	(South Korea) Song Young-kwang	KU	3-8
JUN-FITTED Racing	12	(South Korea) Hwang Jin-woo	KU	All
JUN-FITTED Racing	77	(South Korea) Park Jung-jun	KU	All
L&K Motors	22	(South Korea) Lee Eun-jung	KU	1-2, 5-8
L&K Motors	32	(South Korea) Son In-young	KU	1-2
NEXEN-VOLLGAS Motorsports	04	(South Korea) Jung Eui-chul	NEX	1-2, 4-8
NEXEN-VOLLGAS Motorsports	44	(South Korea) Kim Jae-hyun	NEX	1-2, 4-8
Seohan GP	05	(South Korea) Kim Joong-kun	NEX	All
Seohan GP	06	(South Korea) Jang Hyun-jin	NEX	All
Seohan GP	07	(South Korea) Jeong Hoe-won	NEX	All

=== Entrant changes ===
==== Team changes ====
- On March 12, at approximately 10:09pm, a fire broke out at Hankook's production plant in Daejeon, halting production after suffering severe damage to one of their factory complexes. This incident in turn has affected supply to all teams using Hankook tyres in this year's Superrace Championship. As a result, Hankook-AtlasBX Motorsports announced that they (along with their second team, SONIC Motorsports-AtlasBX) will not contest the 2023 championship. Additionally, VOLLGAS Motorsports switched to Nexen Tire, joining Seohan GP and CJ Logistics Racing, who switched from Kumho Tire. JUN-FITTED Racing will switch to Kumho, joining newly formed AMC Racing, Brand New Racing, ECSTA Racing, and L&K Motors, who initially switched to Hankook.

==== Driver changes ====
- As a result of the two AtlasBX teams withdrawing due to Hankook Tire's Daejeon plant fire and production stall, their drivers have decided not to contest for other teams in Super 6000. It was reported that defending champion Kim Jong-kyum would be joined by SONIC driver Yang Tae-keun and Noh Dong-gi; the latter returning from military service. Roelof Bruins and Steven Cho reportedly did not register to retain their spots in the team and are pursuing other motor racing activities.
- MIDAS Racing driver Seo Seok-hyun and Japanese driver Takayuki Aoki will join newly formed AMC Racing's two-car operation. The latter will be replaced by Carlo van Dam from round 3 onwards.
- Brand New Racing driver Park Gyu-seung will step up from Kumho GT1 to Super 6000 to join Lee Hyo-jun in the team's expanded two-car operation.
- CJ Logistics Racing announced that Oh Han-sol will move to their team, while Park Jun-seo will step up to join in from the Kumho GT1 class.
- ECSTA Racing's Lee Jung-woo will not contest in Super 6000 due to military service. Japanese driver Hiroki Yoshida will join Lee Chan-joon and Lee Chang-uk for the first and second rounds of the championship. Kumho GT1 driver Song Young-kwang is reported to drive the third entry for the rest of the season, due to Yoshida's Japanese racing commitments and tyre development for Kumho.
- Hwang Jin-woo and Hwang Do-yun left N'Fera Racing as the team ended operations after the 2022 championship. The latter was left without a drive while Jin-woo joined Park Jung-jun at JUN-FITTED Racing to replace CJ Logistics Racing-bound Oh Han-sol.
- Seo Ju-won left L&K Motors at the end of the 2022 season. He is replaced by Son In-young, who joined the team just a week before the first race.

==== Mid-season changes ====
- NEXEN-VOLLGAS Motorsport initially announced that they wouldn't participate in the remaining races. The team stated that they were planning to participate at international races after the success in the championship. However, on June 27, 2023, the team reverted their decision and announced that they will participate the remaining races of the season.
- L&K Motors missed rounds 3 and 4 due to financial reasons. The team returned from round 5 onwards, but they ran only one car for Lee Eun-jung.

== Season summary ==
Round	Circuit	Pole position	Fastest lap	Winning driver	Winning team	Winning tyre	Report
1	(South Korea) Everland Speedway 1&2	(South Korea) Lee Chang-uk	(South Korea) Kim Jae-hyun	(South Korea) Lee Chang-uk	ECSTA Racing	(South Korea) Kumho	Report
2	(South Korea) Everland Speedway 1&2	(South Korea) Lee Chan-joon	(South Korea) Kim Jae-hyun	(South Korea) Lee Chan-joon	ECSTA Racing	(South Korea) Kumho	Report
3	(South Korea) Korea International Circuit 1	(South Korea) Lee Chang-uk	(South Korea) Lee Chang-uk	(South Korea) Lee Chan-joon	ECSTA Racing	(South Korea) Kumho	Report
4	(South Korea) Inje Speedium	(South Korea) Lee Chang-uk	(South Korea) Kim Jae-hyun	(South Korea) Lee Chang-uk	ECSTA Racing	(South Korea) Kumho	Report
5	(South Korea) Everland Speedway 3	(South Korea) Kim Jae-hyun	(South Korea) Kim Jae-hyun	(South Korea) Kim Jae-hyun	NEXEN-VOLLGAS Motorsports	(South Korea) Nexen	Report
6	(South Korea) Korea International Circuit 2	(South Korea) Lee Chang-uk	(South Korea) Jang Hyun-jin	(South Korea) Lee Chan-joon	ECSTA Racing	(South Korea) Kumho	Report
7	(South Korea) Everland Speedway 4&5	(South Korea) Jung Eui-chul	(South Korea) Lee Chang-uk	(South Korea) Lee Chang-uk	ECSTA Racing	(South Korea) Kumho	Report
8	(South Korea) Everland Speedway 4&5	(South Korea) Hwang Jin-woo	(South Korea) Kim Jae-hyun	(South Korea) Kim Jae-hyun	NEXEN-VOLLGAS Motorsports	(South Korea) Nexen	Report

== Championship standings ==
=== Drivers championships ===
==== Scoring system ====
Position	1st	2nd	3rd	4th	5th	6th	7th	8th	9th	10th	Race completion
Race	25	18	15	12	10	8	6	4	2	1	1
Round 3	30	22	18	14	12	9	7	5	3	2	1
Qualifying	3	2	1								

==== Super 6000 ====
2023 Super 6000 Driver Standings
Rank	Driver	EVE1 (South Korea)	EVE2 (South Korea)	KOR1 (South Korea)	INJ (South Korea)	EVE3 (South Korea)	KOR2 (South Korea)	EVE4 (South Korea)	EVE5 (South Korea)	Points
1	(South Korea) Lee Chan-joon	9^{2}	**1**^{1}	1	3	8	1^{3}	9	3	132
2	(South Korea) Lee Chang-uk	**1**^{1}	Ret^{2}	**8**^{1}	**1**^{1}	Ret	**Ret**^{1}	1^{2}	2^{2}	123
3	(South Korea) Kim Jae-hyun	2^{3}	8		2^{3}	**1**^{1}	7	7	1^{3}	120
4	(South Korea) Jung Eui-chul	3	2^{3}		5	3	14	**2**^{1}	9	89
5	(South Korea) Jang Hyun-jin	5	5	Ret^{2}	9	2^{2}	2	11	4	84
6	(South Korea) Park Gyu-seung	6	6	2	8	9	Ret	4	5	73
7	(South Korea) Jeong Hoe-won	12	16	3	12	6	3^{2}	5	6	69
8	(South Korea) Kim Joong-kun	8	7	11^{3}	13	4^{3}	4	3	7	65
9	(South Korea) Hwang Jin-woo	13	3	7	10	5	6	6	**16**^{1}	60
10	(South Korea) Park Jun-seo	17	9	4	4	Ret	8	8	10	44
11	(South Korea) Oh Han-sol	11	Ret	9	6	7	5	Ret^{3}	11	34
12	(Japan) Takayuki Aoki	4	4				9			29
13	(South Korea) Song Young-kwang			6	Ret	13	11	15	8	18
14	(Netherlands) Carlo van Dam			5	Ret	11				14
15	(South Korea) Lee Hyo-jun	10	10	Ret	7	Ret	13	12	DNS	13
16	(Japan) Hiroki Yoshida	7	11							8
17	(South Korea) Tony Seo Seok-hyun	15	14	10		12		14	12	8
18	(South Korea) Park Jung-jun	DNS	12	Ret	11	10	12	13	13	7
19	(South Korea) Jung Kyung Hun						10	10	14	5
20	(South Korea) Lee Eun-jung	15	16			Ret	15	16	15	5
21	(South Korea) Son In-young	14	13							2
Rank	Driver	EVE1 (South Korea)	EVE2 (South Korea)	KOR1 (South Korea)	INJ (South Korea)	EVE3 (South Korea)	KOR2 (South Korea)	EVE4 (South Korea)	EVE5 (South Korea)	Points

Key
Colour	Result
Gold	Winner
Silver	2nd place
Bronze	3rd place
Green	Other points position
Blue	Other classified position
Blue	Not classified, finished (NC)
Purple	Not classified, retired (Ret)
Red	Did not qualify (DNQ)
Red	Did not pre-qualify (DNPQ)
Black	Disqualified (DSQ)
White	Did not start (DNS)
White	Race cancelled (C)
Blank	Did not practice (DNP)
Blank	Excluded (EX)
Blank	Did not arrive (DNA)
Blank	Withdrawn (WD)
Annotation	Meaning
Superscript number^{123}	Points-scoring position in qualifying
**Bold**	Pole position
Italics	Fastest lap

=== Teams championships ===
==== Super 6000 ====
The teams championship is decided upon points scored by two drivers per team after each race. Teams with 3 or more drivers have 15 days before each race to select two drivers to add their points towards their final tally.

2023 Super 6000 Team Standings
Rank	Team	EVE1 (South Korea)	EVE2 (South Korea)	KOR1 (South Korea)	INJ (South Korea)	EVE3 (South Korea)	KOR2 (South Korea)	EVE4 (South Korea)	EVE5	Points
1	ECSTA Racing	**1**^{1}	**1**^{1}	1	**1**^{1}	8				155
1	ECSTA Racing	9^{2}	11	**8**^{1}	3	Ret				155
2	NEXEN-VOLLGAS Motorsports	2^{3}	2^{3}		2^{3}	**1**^{1}				141
2	NEXEN-VOLLGAS Motorsports	3	11		5	3				141
3	Seohan GP	5	5	11^{3}	9	2^{2}				68
3	Seohan GP	8	16	Ret^{2}	13	6				68
4	Brand New Racing	6	6	2	7	9				60
4	Brand New Racing	10	10	Ret	8	Ret				60
5	CJ Logistics Racing	11	9	4	4	7				53
5	CJ Logistics Racing	17	Ret	9	6	Ret				53
6	AMC Racing	7	7	5	Ret	11				46
6	AMC Racing	15	14	10		12				46
7	JUN-FITTED Racing	13	3	7	10	5				42
7	JUN-FITTED Racing		12	Ret	11	10				42
8	L&K Motors	14	13			Ret				4
8	L&K Motors	15	16							4
Rank	Team	EVE1 (South Korea)	EVE2 (South Korea)	KOR1 (South Korea)	INJ (South Korea)	EVE3 (South Korea)	KOR2 (South Korea)	EVE4 (South Korea)	EVE5	Points

Key
Colour	Result
Gold	Winner
Silver	2nd place
Bronze	3rd place
Green	Other points position
Blue	Other classified position
Blue	Not classified, finished (NC)
Purple	Not classified, retired (Ret)
Red	Did not qualify (DNQ)
Red	Did not pre-qualify (DNPQ)
Black	Disqualified (DSQ)
White	Did not start (DNS)
White	Race cancelled (C)
Blank	Did not practice (DNP)
Blank	Excluded (EX)
Blank	Did not arrive (DNA)
Blank	Withdrawn (WD)
Annotation	Meaning
Superscript number^{123}	Points-scoring position in qualifying
**Bold**	Pole position
Italics	Fastest lap

=== Tyre manufacturers championships ===
Like the teams championship, the tyre manufacturers must select 5 drivers per tyre user 15 days before each round to add their points towards their final tally.

2023 Super 6000 Tyre Manufacturer Standings
Rank	Team	EVE1 (South Korea)	EVE2 (South Korea)	KOR1 (South Korea)	INJ (South Korea)	EVE3 (South Korea)	KOR2 (South Korea)	EVE4 (South Korea)	EVE5	Points
1	(South Korea) Kumho	**1**^{1}	**1**^{1}	1	**1**^{1}	5				298
1	(South Korea) Kumho	4	3	2	3	8				298
1	(South Korea) Kumho	6	4	5	7	9				298
1	(South Korea) Kumho	7	6	6	8	10				298
1	(South Korea) Kumho	9^{2}	10	7	10	11				298
2	(South Korea) Nexen	2^{3}	2^{3}	3	2^{3}	**1**^{1}				292
2	(South Korea) Nexen	3	5	4	4	2^{2}				292
2	(South Korea) Nexen	5	7	9	5	3				292
2	(South Korea) Nexen	8	8	11^{3}	6	4^{3}				292
2	(South Korea) Nexen	12	9		9	6				292
Rank	Team	EVE1 (South Korea)	EVE2 (South Korea)	KOR1 (South Korea)	INJ (South Korea)	EVE3 (South Korea)	KOR2 (South Korea)	EVE4 (South Korea)	EVE5	Points

Key
Colour	Result
Gold	Winner
Silver	2nd place
Bronze	3rd place
Green	Other points position
Blue	Other classified position
Blue	Not classified, finished (NC)
Purple	Not classified, retired (Ret)
Red	Did not qualify (DNQ)
Red	Did not pre-qualify (DNPQ)
Black	Disqualified (DSQ)
White	Did not start (DNS)
White	Race cancelled (C)
Blank	Did not practice (DNP)
Blank	Excluded (EX)
Blank	Did not arrive (DNA)
Blank	Withdrawn (WD)
Annotation	Meaning
Superscript number^{123}	Points-scoring position in qualifying
**Bold**	Pole position
Italics	Fastest lap
