= Ye Hongli =

Chinese racing driver (born 1992)

- Nationality: (China) Chinese
- Born: 22 May 1992 (age 34) Luqiao District, Taizhou, Zhejiang, China

GT World Challenge Asia career
- Debut season: 2017
- Current team: Origine Motorsport
- Categorisation: FIA Silver
- Car number: 87
- Former teams: Absolute Racing, HubAuto Corsa
- Starts: 52
- Championships: 2 (2024, 2025)
- Wins: 6
- Podiums: 14
- Poles: 2
- Fastest laps: 2

Previous series
- 2021–22 2016–17 2016 2015–20 2014 2011–13, 2016: Porsche Carrera Cup Asia; All-Japan Formula Three Championship; Euroformula Open Championship; China Touring Car Championship; Formula Renault 2.0 Alps; Asian Formula Renault Challenge

Championship titles
- 2025 2024 2022 2018: GT World Challenge Asia; GT World Challenge Asia; Porsche Carrera Cup Asia; China Touring Car Championship

Ye Hongli (Chinese: 叶弘历; pinyin: Yè Hónglì, born 22 May 1992), also known as Leo Ye, is a Chinese racing driver. Ye is the reigning champion of the GT World Challenge Asia, having consecutively won the 2024 and 2025 championships alongside Yuan Bo for Origine Motorsport, and was also the 2018 champion of the China Touring Car Championship, which he competed in between 2015 and 2020 as a factory driver for Dongfeng Yueda Kia.

== Career ==
=== Karting ===
Ye began his racing career in karting at the late age of 16, making his debut in the China National Karting Championship after driving a kart for the first time in 2007. After a largely unremarkable season, he suspended his karting career, moving to the United Kingdom to pursue an education at the King's College London. He would not return to karting until 2012, but would succeed upon his comeback, winning that year's National Open Class of the Rotax Max Challenge China. Ye defended his title the following year, and continued competing in karting alongside single-seaters until being signed as a professional factory driver.

=== Formula Renault ===
Ye made his single-seater racing debut in 2011, making a cameo appearance in a single round of the Asian Formula Renault Challenge at Shanghai International Circuit, and drove in another one-off at Zhuhai the following year. He would move full-time into single-seaters after graduating from university in 2013, competing in the final two rounds of the British Formula Renault Championship and the Asian Formula Renault Series, winning three of the four races he contested in the latter championship.

Ye spent 2014 in Europe, competing in the Formula Renault 2.0 Alps Series and Eurocup Formula Renault 2.0 as a guest driver for Koiranen GP alongside the likes of Nyck de Vries, George Russell, and compatriot Ling Kang. He recorded a best finish of ninth at Monza.

=== China Touring Car Championship ===
In 2015, Ye returned to China after signing as a factory driver for Dongfeng Yueda Kia in the China Touring Car Championship. After finishing sixth in 2015, his first year in the championship, Ye would compete in the CTCC on a largely part-time basis as more opportunities arose overseas. In his only other full-time championship campaign in 2018, Ye claimed the championship title with one round remaining, ending the season with a sizable 34.5-point gap over runner-up Cao Hongwei.

=== Formula 3 ===
Ye returned to formula racing in 2016, dovetailing his CTCC campaign with a part-time season in the Japanese Formula 3 Championship. Driving for B-Max Racing Team with the support of Taiwan-based KRC, Ye became the first Chinese driver after fellow CTCC driver "Alex" Yang Fan to compete in the championship, and the first to race in the top-level Championship class. He would also contest the flagship Macau Grand Prix with B-Max at the end of the 2016 season, but would not take part in the Grand Prix itself after sustaining terminal damage in a massive crash with Daiki Sasaki during the qualification race.

Ye continued with B-Max in Japanese Formula 3 for the 2017 season, achieving a single podium finish during the third round at Fuji.

=== Sportscar racing ===
In 2019, Ye made the full-time switch to sports car racing, competing alongside "Bob" Yuan Bo in the GT World Challenge Asia after competing in the series on a part-time basis in 2017 and 2018. He was set to remain alongside Yuan at Absolute Racing for 2020; however, following the 2020 season's cancellation due to the COVID-19 pandemic, Ye was forced to sit out the majority of 2020.

Ye spent 2021 and 2022 racing in China, contesting the Porsche Carrera Cup Asia. After finishing fourth in his first season, Ye proceeded to dominate the 2022 season for JUNJIE Racing, equalling Chris van der Drift's record of six consecutive victories to seal the championship title with two races to go.

Ye reunited with Yuan for the 2023 season of the GT World Challenge Asia, now competing for R&B Racing, of which both drivers were co-founders. Ye also made his debut that year in the FIA GT World Cup for R&B, claiming the Silver Cup title and beating out renowned drivers such as Kévin Estre and Matteo Cairoli en route to a tenth-place overall finish.

2024 would see Ye achieve one of the greatest successes of his career, as he and Yuan, driving for the newly rebranded Origine Motorsport team, won the overall 2024 GT World Challenge Asia title, triumphing over reigning champion Anthony Liu Xu and his teammate Alessio Picariello to claim the championship at the season finale in Shanghai.

== Personal life ==
Ye was named by his maternal grandfather after the Qianlong Emperor (personal name Hongli). In addition to motorsport, Ye is also vice chairman at a construction company in Shanghai, having previously worked in financial management at an investment firm. Since 2024, Ye has also held an executive position at the Returned Overseas Students Association in his hometown of Taizhou.

== Racing record ==
=== Career summary ===
Season	Series	Team	Races	Wins	Poles	F/Laps	Podiums	Points	Position
2011	Asian Formula Renault Challenge	FRD Racing Team	2	0	0	0	0	32	15th
2012	Asian Formula Renault Challenge	Privateer	2	0	0	0	0	26	14th
2013	Asian Formula Renault Series - Asian Class	Team KRC	4	4	2	4	4	120	**3rd**
2013	Protyre Formula Renault Championship	Fortec Competition	3	0	0	0	0	38	21st
2014	Formula Renault 2.0 Alps	Koiranen GP	10	0	0	0	0	0	NC†
2014	Eurocup Formula Renault 2.0	Koiranen GP	4	0	0	0	0	0	NC†
2015	China Touring Car Championship - Super Production	Dongfeng Yueda Kia Racing Team	7	2	1	0	3	43	6th
2016	China Touring Car Championship - Super Production	Dongfeng Yueda Kia Racing Team	12	2	5	4	5	122	6th
2016	Japanese Formula 3 Championship	Team KRC with B-Max	9	0	0	0	0	5	11th
2016	Euroformula Open Championship	BVM Racing	8	0	0	0	0	26	16th
2016	Asian Formula Renault Series	Team KRC	2	2	1	2	2	60	10th
2016	Macau Grand Prix	B-Max Racing Team	1	0	0	0	0	N/A	DNS
2017	Japanese Formula 3 Championship	Team KRC with B-Max	18	0	0	0	1	13	7th
2017	China Touring Car Championship - Super Production	Dongfeng Yueda Kia Racing Team	10	0	0	1	1	75	12th
2017	Blancpain GT Series Asia - GT3	HubAuto Racing	2	0	0	1	0	0	NC†
2017	FRD LMP3 Series	S&D Motorsports	4	0	2	1	0	28	16th
2017–18	Asian Le Mans Series - LMP3	Taiwan Beer GH Motorsport	2	0	0	0	1	18	8th
2018	China Touring Car Championship - Super Production	Dongfeng Yueda Kia Racing Team	15	3	1	1	6	160	**1st**
2018	China Endurance Series - LMP3 Trophy	PTRS Racing Team	4	2	2	0	4	?	**2nd**
2018	Blancpain GT Series Asia - GT3	HubAuto Corsa	6	0	1	1	1	60	13th
2018	Blancpain GT Series Asia - Silver	HubAuto Corsa	6	0	2	2	3	77	10th
2018	FIA GT Nations Cup	Herberth Motorsport	1	0	0	0	0	N/A	5th
2019	GT World Challenge Asia - GT3	Absolute Racing	8	1	0	0	3	81	9th
2019	GT World Challenge Asia - Silver	Absolute Racing	8	2	1	2	3	114	9th
2019	Super Taikyū - ST-1	TRACY SPORTS	4	3	0	0	3	101.5†	**2nd†**
2019	China Touring Car Championship - Super Production	Dongfeng Yueda Kia Racing Team	8	0	0	1	1	65	12th
2019–20	Asian Le Mans Series - GT	FIST Team AAI	1	0	0	0	0	0	18th
2020	China Touring Car Championship - Super Production	Dongfeng Yueda Kia Racing Team	4	1	1	1	3	62	11th
2020	Macau GT Cup	TORO Racing	1	1	0	0	1	N/A	**1st**
2021	Porsche Carrera Cup Asia	BD Group	14	4	3		9	239	4th
2021	China GT Championship - GT3 Pro-Am	Absolute Racing							
2021	China Endurance Championship - GT3	Absolute Racing							
2021	Macau GT Cup	TORO Racing	1	0	1	1	1	N/A	**2nd**
2022	Porsche Carrera Cup Asia	JUNJIE Racing	8	6	3	?	8	188	**1st**
2022	China Endurance Championship - GT3	Phantom Pro Racing	4						
2023	GT World Challenge Asia - GT3	R&B Racing	12	0	1	0	2	74	9th
2023	GT World Challenge Asia - GT3 Silver	R&B Racing	12	7	8	7	9	211	**2nd**
2023	FIA GT World Cup	R&B Racing	1	0	0	0	0	N/A	10th
2024	GT World Challenge Asia	Origine Motorsport	12	2	0	0	4	138	**1st**
2024	GT World Challenge Asia - Silver-Am	Origine Motorsport	12	8	5	?	10	238	**1st**
2024	FIA GT World Cup	Origine Motorsport	1	0	0	0	0	N/A	16th
2024	GT Sprint Challenge - GT3 Pro-Am	Climax Racing	2	1	0	1	2	?	**2nd**
2024	12 Hours of Sepang	R&B Racing	1	1	1	0	1	N/A	**1st**
2024–25	Asian Le Mans Series - GT	Origine Motorsport	6	0	0	0	0	29	12th
2025	GT World Challenge Asia	Origine Motorsport	12	3	0		4	125	**1st**
2025	GT World Challenge Asia - Pro-Am	Origine Motorsport	12	3	2		6	151	**3rd**
2025	Intercontinental GT Challenge	Origine Motorsport	1	0	0	0	0	0	NC
2025	Shanghai 8 Hours - GT3 Silver-Am	Origine Motorsport	1	1	1	0	1	N/A	**1st**
2025–26	Asian Le Mans Series - GT	Origine Motorsport	6	0	0	0	3	58	6th
2025–26	24H Series Middle East - GT3-Am	Origine Motorsport							
2026	Nürburgring Langstrecken-Serie - SP10	SRS Team Sorg Rennsport							
2026	Nürburgring Langstrecken-Serie - SP9	High Class Racing							
2026	24 Hours of Nürburgring - SP9 Pro-Am	High Class Racing	1	0	0	0	0	N/A	6th
2026	GT World Challenge Europe Endurance Cup	High Class Racing							
2026	GT World Challenge America - Pro-Am	High Class Racing	1	0	0	0	0	0	NC†
2026	Intercontinental GT Challenge	High Class Racing	4	0	0	0	0	2	29th
2026	China GT Championship - GT3	Winhere Origine Motorsport							
2026	Shanghai 8 Hours	Origine Motorsport	1	0	0	0	0	N/A	9th

^{†} As Ye was a guest driver, he was ineligible for championship points.
^{*} Season still in progress.

=== Complete Eurocup Formula Renault 2.0 results ===
(key) (Races in bold indicate pole position; races in italics indicate fastest lap)

Year	Entrant	1	2	3	4	5	6	7	8	9	10	11	12	13	14	DC	Points
2014	Koiranen GP	ALC; 1	ALC; 2	SPA; 1	SPA; 2	MSC; 1	MSC; 2	NÜR; 1	NÜR; 2	HUN; 1	HUN; 2	LEC; 1; 24	LEC; 2; 20	JER; 1 Ret	JER; 2; 23	NC†	0

† As Ye was a guest driver, he was ineligible for points

=== Complete Formula Renault 2.0 Alps Series results ===
(key) (Races in bold indicate pole position; races in italics indicate fastest lap)

Year	Team	1	2	3	4	5	6	7	8	9	10	11	12	13	14	Pos	Points
2014	Koiranen GP	IMO; 1; 19	IMO; 2; 19	PAU; 1	PAU; 2	RBR; 1	RBR; 2	SPA; 1; 13	SPA; 2; 16	MNZ; 1; 17	MNZ; 2; 9	MUG; 1; 28	MUG; 2; 17	JER; 1; 22	JER; 2; 18	NC†	0

† As Ye was a guest driver, he was ineligible for points

=== Complete China Touring Car Championship results ===
(key) (Races in bold indicate pole position) (Races in italics indicate fastest lap)

Year	Team	Car	Class	1	2	3	4	5	6	7	8	9	10	11	12	13	14	15	16	Pos.	Points
2015	Dongfeng Yueda Kia Racing Team	Kia K3S	Super Production	SIC; DSQ	STC; 8	KOR; Ret	GIC; Ret	SIC; 1	JYC; 1	**BJC**; 3										6th	43
2016	Dongfeng Yueda Kia Racing Team	Kia K3	Super Production	**JWC**; **1** Ret	JWC; 2; 5	**ZIC**; **1**; 3	ZIC; 2; 4	SIC; 1; 11	SIC; 2; 5	**KOR**; **1**; 2	KOR; 2; 5	**GIC**; **1** Ret	GIC; 2; 1	SIC; 1	SIC; 2	JIC; 1	JIC; 2	**STC**; **1**; 2	STC; 2; 1	6th	122
2017	Dongfeng Yueda Kia Racing Team	Kia K3	Super Production	ZIC; 1	ZIC; 2	GIC; 1 Ret^{2}	GIC; 2; 12	JIC; 1	JIC; 2	STC; 1	STC; 2	SIC; 1; 5	SIC; 2; 4	ZJC; 1; 4^{5}	ZJC; 2; 11	WSC; 1; 2^{2}	WSC; 2 Ret	SIC; 1 Ret^{2}	SIC; 2; 6	12th	75
2018	Dongfeng Yueda Kia Racing Team	Kia K3	Super Production	SIC; SPR; Ret^{5}	SIC; FEA; 6	**ZIC**; **SPR**; 1^{1}	ZIC; FEA; 7	GIC; SPR; 2^{3}	GIC; FEA; 3	STC; SPR; 8	STC; FEA; C	ZJC; SPR; 1^{2}	ZJC; FEA; 1	WSC; SPR; Ret	WSC; FEA; 5	STC; SPR; 2^{3}	STC; FEA; 8	SIC; SPR; 9	SIC; FEA; 10	1st	160
2019	Dongfeng Yueda Kia Racing Team	Kia K3 (BD)	Super Production	GIC; 1	GIC; 2	SIC; 1; 11	SIC; 2; 6	STC; 1	STC; 2	ZJC; 1	ZJC; 2	NIC; 1	NIC; 2	ZZC; 1; 4	ZZC; 2; 4	SIC; 1; 4	SIC; 2 Ret	WSC; SPR; 2	WSC; FEA; 7	12th	65
2020	Dongfeng Yueda Kia Racing Team	Kia K3 (BD)	Super Production	ZZC; 1	ZZC; 2	ZZC; 1	ZZC; 2	ZZC; 1	ZZC; 2	ZZC; 1	ZZC; 2	STC; 1; 3	STC; 2; 6	**STC**; **1**; 1^{1}	STC; 2; 2	JWC; 1	JWC; 2	JWC; 1	JWC; 2	11th	62

=== Complete GT World Challenge Asia results ===
(key) (Races in bold indicate pole position) (Races in italics indicate fastest lap)

Year	Team	Car	Class	1	2	3	4	5	6	7	8	9	10	11	12	DC	Points
2017	HubAuto Racing	Porsche 911 GT3 R (991)	Silver	SEP; 1	SEP; 2	CHA; 1	CHA; 2	SUZ; 1	SUZ; 2	FSW; 1	FSW; 2	SIC; 1; 9	SIC; 2; 10	ZJC; 1	ZJC; 2	NC	0†
2018	HubAuto Racing	Ferrari 488 GT3	Silver	SEP; 1; 4	SEP; 2; 5	CHA; 1; 2	**CHA**; **2**; 6	SUZ; 1; 4	**SUZ**; **2**; 15	FSW; 1	FSW; 2	SIC; 1	SIC; 2	NIC; 1	NIC; 2	10th	77
2019	Absolute Racing	Porsche 911 GT3 R (991)	Silver	SEP; 1	SEP; 2	CHA; 1	CHA; 2	SUZ; 1; 2	SUZ; 2; 6	FSW; 1; 8	FSW; 2; 13	KOR; 1; 5	KOR; 2; 3	SIC; 1; 11	**SIC**; **2**; 1	9th	114
2023	R&B Racing	Porsche 911 GT3 R (992)	Silver	BUR; 1; 1	BUR; 2; 2	**FSW**; **1** Ret	**FSW**; **2**; 1	SUZ; 1; 1	**SUZ**; **2**; 1	MOT; 1; 2	**MOT**; **2**; 1	OKA; 1 Ret	OKA; 2 DNS	**SEP**; **1**; 1	**SEP**; **2**; 1	2nd	211
2024	Origine Motorsport	Porsche 911 GT3 R (992)	Silver-Am	**SEP**; **1**; 1	**SEP**; **2**; 1	BUR; 1; 1	BUR; 2; 2	**FSW**; **1**; 1	FSW; 2 Ret	**SUZ**; **1**; 9	SUZ; 2; 1	**OKA**; **1**; 1	OKA; 2; 2	**SIC**; **1**; 1	SIC; 2; 1	1st	238
2025	Origine Motorsport	Porsche 911 GT3 R (992)	Pro-Am	SEP; 1; 1	SEP; 2; 3	MAN; 1; 1	MAN; 2; 4	BUR; 1 Ret	BUR; 2; 9	FSW; 1; 1	FSW; 2; 2	OKA; 1; 3	OKA; 2 Ret	BEI; 1; 7	BEI; 2; 6	3rd	151

^{†} As Ye was a guest driver, he was ineligible for championship points.

=== Complete Asian Le Mans Series results ===
(key) (Races in bold indicate pole position) (Races in italics indicate fastest lap)

Year	Team	Class	Car	1	2	3	4	5	6	Pos.	Points
2017–18	Taiwan Beer GH Motorsport	LMP3	Ligier JS P3	ZHU	FUJ; Ret	BUR; 2	SEP			8th	18
2019–20	FIST-Team AAI	GT	BMW M6 GT3	SEP; Ret	BEN	SEP	CHA			18th	0
2024–25	Origine Motorsport	GT	Porsche 911 GT3 R (992)	SEP; 1 Ret	SEP; 2; 5	DUB; 2; 4	DUB; 2; 8	ABU; 1; 12	ABU; 2; 24	12th	29
2025–26	Origine Motorsport	GT	Porsche 911 GT3 R (992)	SEP; 1; 6	SEP; 2; 3	DUB; 1; 10	DUB; 2; 2	ABU; 1; 4	ABU; 2; 17	6th	58
