= 2025 Porsche Carrera Cup Asia =

Motorsport racing season

The 2025 Porsche Carrera Cup Asia was the twenty-second season of the Porsche Carrera Cup Asia. The season commenced on 22 March at the Shanghai International Circuit, and finished at Marina Bay Street Circuit on 5 October.

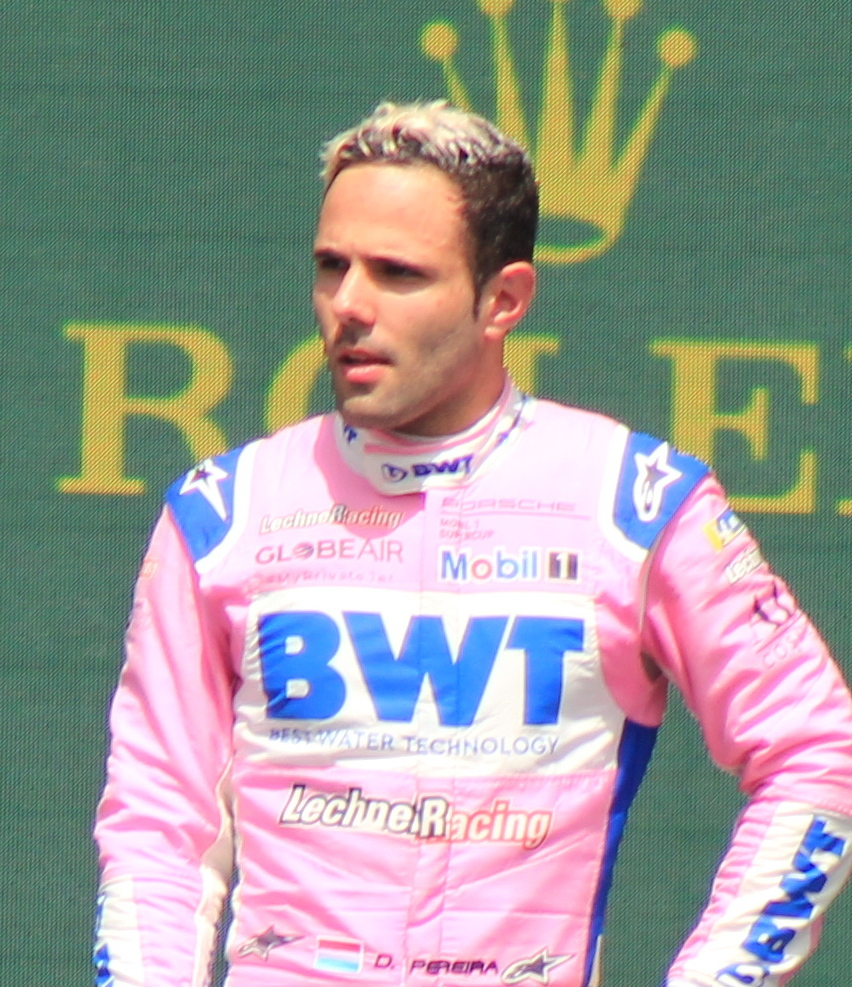
Dylan Pereira (pictured in 2022) won the Overall Drivers' Championship title

== Calendar ==
Round	Circuit	Date	Supporting	Location
1	(China) Shanghai International Circuit, Jiading District	22–23 March	Formula One World Championship; F1 Academy; SRO GT Cup	2025 Porsche Carrera Cup Asia is located in Asia
2	(Japan) Mobility Resort Motegi, Motegi	19–20 April	Super Formula Championship; All Japan Road Race Championship	2025 Porsche Carrera Cup Asia is located in Asia
3	(Malaysia) Sepang International Circuit, Sepang	7–8 June	TCR Asia Series	2025 Porsche Carrera Cup Asia is located in Asia
4	(Thailand) Bangsaen Street Circuit, Chonburi	5–6 July	Formula 4 South East Asia Championship; Thailand Super Series; Bangsaen Grand Prix	2025 Porsche Carrera Cup Asia is located in Asia
5	(Indonesia) Mandalika International Street Circuit, Central Lombok	22–24 August	Porsche Sprint Challenge Indonesia	2025 Porsche Carrera Cup Asia is located in Asia
6	Marina Bay Street Circuit, Singapore	3–5 October	Formula One World Championship; F1 Academy	2025 Porsche Carrera Cup Asia is located in Asia

== Entry list ==
Team	No.	Driver	Class	Rounds
(China) / Team Shanghai Yonda BWT (Note: Car No. 5 entered as Team Shanghai Yongda BWT, No. 6 & No. 27 entered as Phantom Global Racing, No. 7 entered as BWT Phantom Global Racing, No. 8 entered as Team Wetrade x PGR and No. 9 entered as Team Betterlife); (China) / Phantom Global Racing; (China) / BWT Phantom Global Racing; (China) / Team Wetrade x PGR; (China) / Team Betterlife	5	(Luxembourg) Dylan Pereira	P	All
(China) / Team Shanghai Yonda BWT; (China) / Phantom Global Racing; (China) / BWT Phantom Global Racing; (China) / Team Wetrade x PGR; (China) / Team Betterlife	6	(Hong Kong) Dylan Yip	P	All
(China) / Team Shanghai Yonda BWT; (China) / Phantom Global Racing; (China) / BWT Phantom Global Racing; (China) / Team Wetrade x PGR; (China) / Team Betterlife	7	(China) Bao Jinlong	PA	All
(China) / Team Shanghai Yonda BWT; (China) / Phantom Global Racing; (China) / BWT Phantom Global Racing; (China) / Team Wetrade x PGR; (China) / Team Betterlife	8	(United Kingdom) Josh Rowledge	P	All
(China) / Team Shanghai Yonda BWT; (China) / Phantom Global Racing; (China) / BWT Phantom Global Racing; (China) / Team Wetrade x PGR; (China) / Team Betterlife	9	(China) Li Chao	PA	1–4, 6
(China) / Team Shanghai Yonda BWT; (China) / Phantom Global Racing; (China) / BWT Phantom Global Racing; (China) / Team Wetrade x PGR; (China) / Team Betterlife	9	(France) Marcus Amand	P	5
(China) / Team Shanghai Yonda BWT; (China) / Phantom Global Racing; (China) / BWT Phantom Global Racing; (China) / Team Wetrade x PGR; (China) / Team Betterlife	27	(China) Yan Chuang	Am	All
(New Zealand) / Team Porsche New Zealand (Note: Car No. 10 & 66 entered as Team Porsche New Zealand, car No. 17 & 38 entered as Sime Motors Racing, car and No. 61 & No. 76 entered as EBM.); (New Zealand) / Sime Motors Racing; (New Zealand) / EBM	10	(New Zealand) Brock Gilchrist	P	1–5
(New Zealand) / Team Porsche New Zealand; (New Zealand) / Sime Motors Racing; (New Zealand) / EBM	10	(United States) Li Kerong (Note: Li Kerong is a Chinese driver competed under the American license.)	PA	6
(New Zealand) / Team Porsche New Zealand; (New Zealand) / Sime Motors Racing; (New Zealand) / EBM	17	(Malaysia) Nazim Azman	P	3
(New Zealand) / Team Porsche New Zealand; (New Zealand) / Sime Motors Racing; (New Zealand) / EBM	38	(United Kingdom) Hugo Ellis	P	All
(New Zealand) / Team Porsche New Zealand; (New Zealand) / Sime Motors Racing; (New Zealand) / EBM	61	(Malaysia) Adrian D'Silva	M	All
(New Zealand) / Team Porsche New Zealand; (New Zealand) / Sime Motors Racing; (New Zealand) / EBM	66	(New Zealand) Marco Giltrap	P	3
(New Zealand) / Team Porsche New Zealand; (New Zealand) / Sime Motors Racing; (New Zealand) / EBM	76	(Thailand) Munkong Sathienthirakul	Am	1–4
(New Zealand) / Team Porsche New Zealand; (New Zealand) / Sime Motors Racing; (New Zealand) / EBM	76	(Australia) Oscar Targett	P	5
(New Zealand) / Team Porsche New Zealand; (New Zealand) / Sime Motors Racing; (New Zealand) / EBM	76	(Australia) Bayley Hall	P	6
(Hong Kong) Bergwerk Motorsport	14	(Australia) Matthew Belford	PA	6
(Hong Kong) Bergwerk Motorsport	23	(Hong Kong) Eric Kwong	Am	All
(Hong Kong) / Modena Motorsports (Note: Car No. 16 entered as Modena Motorsports, car No. 21 & 88 entered as OpenRoad Racing); (Hong Kong) / OpenRoad Racing	16	(Hong Kong) John Shen	M	All
(Hong Kong) / Modena Motorsports; (Hong Kong) / OpenRoad Racing	21	(Hong Kong) Francis Tjia	PA	All
(Hong Kong) / Modena Motorsports; (Hong Kong) / OpenRoad Racing	88	(Canada) Christian Chia	M	All
(China) 610 Racing	22	(China) Hu Bo	Am	All
(China) 610 Racing	610	(China) Li Zhicong	P	1
(China) 610 Racing	610	(China) Xu Zhefeng	Am	2, 4
(China) 610 Racing	610	(China) Cao Qikuan	Am	3
(China) 610 Racing	610	(Singapore) Roy Tien Foo Tang	Am	5–6
(Indonesia) Superstars Motorsport	25	(Indonesia) Daffa Ardiansa Boedihardjo	P	3
(China) Z.SPEED Motorsport	45	(Malaysia) Amer Harris Jefry	P	1–4
(China) Z.SPEED Motorsport	321	(China) Li Xuanyu	PA	1–3
(China) Z.SPEED Motorsport	321	(Australia) Dean Cook	M	6
(China) Team Jebsen	55	(Mozambique) Rodrigo Dias Almeida	P	All
(China) Porsche Own Retail 69 Team	69	(China) Jacky Wu	M	All
(China) Toro Racing	77	(China) Eric Zang	PA	1, 4
(China) Toro Racing	77	(Indonesia) Hendrik Jaya Soewadty	Am	2
(China) Toro Racing	77	(Hong Kong) Liu Kai Shun	PA	3
(China) Toro Racing	77	(Australia) Dylan O'Keeffe	P	5
(China) Toro Racing	77	(Singapore) Danial Frost	P	6
(China) Toro Racing	99	(Italy) Enzo Trulli	P	All
(China) Toro Racing	888	(Australia) Dylan O'Keeffe	P	6
(Hong Kong) Triple Ace Racing	91	(Hong Kong) Henry Kwong	Am	All
(Malaysia) Fire Monkey Motorsport	101	(Hong Kong) Chan Sye Wai	Am	3
(China) Origine Motorsport	222	(China) Wang Zhongwei	PA	1, 3
(China) Origine Motorsport	222	(China) Wu Jiaxin	Am	2

Icon	Class
P	Pro Cup
PA	Pro-Am Cup
Am	Am Cup
M	Masters Cup
	Guest Starter

== Results ==
Round		Circuit	Pole position	Fastest lap	Overall winner	Winning team	Pro-Am Winner	Am Winner	Masters Winner
1	R1	(China) Shanghai	(Italy) Enzo Trulli	(Luxembourg) Dylan Pereira	(Italy) Enzo Trulli	(China) Toro Racing	(China) Wang Zhongwei	(Thailand) Munkong Sathienthirakul	(Malaysia) Adrian D'Silva
1	R2	(China) Shanghai	(Luxembourg) Dylan Pereira	(Luxembourg) Dylan Pereira	(Luxembourg) Dylan Pereira	(China) Team Shanghai Yonda BWT	(China) Eric Zang	(Thailand) Munkong Sathienthirakul	(Malaysia) Adrian D'Silva
2	R1	(Japan) Motegi	(Hong Kong) Dylan Yip	(Luxembourg) Dylan Pereira	(Luxembourg) Dylan Pereira	(China) Team Shanghai Yonda BWT	(China) Li Xuanyu	(Thailand) Munkong Sathienthirakul	(China) Jacky Wu
2	R2	(Japan) Motegi	(Luxembourg) Dylan Pereira	(Luxembourg) Dylan Pereira	(Luxembourg) Dylan Pereira	(China) Team Shanghai Yonda BWT	(China) Bao Jinlong	(Thailand) Munkong Sathienthirakul	(Malaysia) Adrian D'Silva
3	R1	(Malaysia) Sepang	(Luxembourg) Dylan Pereira	(Luxembourg) Dylan Pereira	(Luxembourg) Dylan Pereira	(China) Team Shanghai Yonda BWT	(China) Bao Jinlong	(Thailand) Munkong Sathienthirakul	(Malaysia) Adrian D'Silva
3	R2	(Malaysia) Sepang	(Luxembourg) Dylan Pereira	(New Zealand) Marco Giltrap	(Luxembourg) Dylan Pereira	(China) Team Shanghai Yonda BWT	(China) Bao Jinlong	(China) Cao Qikuan	(Canada) Christian Chia
3	R3	(Malaysia) Sepang		(Luxembourg) Dylan Pereira	(Luxembourg) Dylan Pereira	(China) Team Shanghai Yonda BWT	(China) Bao Jinlong	(China) Cao Qikuan	(Hong Kong) John Shen
4	R1	(Thailand) Bangsaen	(Luxembourg) Dylan Pereira	(Luxembourg) Dylan Pereira	(Luxembourg) Dylan Pereira	(China) Team Shanghai Yonda BWT	(China) Bao Jinlong	(Thailand) Munkong Sathienthirakul	(Canada) Christian Chia
4	R2	(Thailand) Bangsaen	(Luxembourg) Dylan Pereira	(Luxembourg) Dylan Pereira	(Luxembourg) Dylan Pereira	(China) Team Shanghai Yonda BWT	(China) Bao Jinlong	(Thailand) Munkong Sathienthirakul	(Canada) Christian Chia
5	R1	(Indonesia) Mandalika	(France) Marcus Amand	(France) Marcus Amand	(France) Marcus Amand	(China) Team Betterlife	(Hong Kong) Francis Tjia	(Hong Kong) Eric Kwong	(Malaysia) Adrian D'Silva
5	R2	(Indonesia) Mandalika	(France) Marcus Amand	(Luxembourg) Dylan Pereira	(France) Marcus Amand	(China) Team Betterlife	(China) Bao Jinlong	(Hong Kong) Henry Kwong	(Malaysia) Adrian D'Silva
5	R3	(Indonesia) Mandalika		(Luxembourg) Dylan Pereira	(Luxembourg) Dylan Pereira	(China) Team Shanghai Yonda BWT	(China) Bao Jinlong	(Hong Kong) Henry Kwong	(China) Jacky Wu
6	R1	(Singapore) Marina Bay	(Luxembourg) Dylan Pereira	(Luxembourg) Dylan Pereira	(Luxembourg) Dylan Pereira	(China) Team Shanghai Yonda BWT	(China) Bao Jinlong	(Hong Kong) Henry Kwong	(Canada) Christian Chia
6	R2	(Singapore) Marina Bay	(Luxembourg) Dylan Pereira	(Luxembourg) Dylan Pereira	(Luxembourg) Dylan Pereira	(China) Team Shanghai Yonda BWT	(Australia) Matthew Belford	(Hong Kong) Eric Kwong	(Canada) Christian Chia

== Championship standings ==
=== Scoring system ===
Points were awarded to the top fifteen classified drivers in every race, using the following system:

Position	1st	2nd	3rd	4th	5th	6th	7th	8th	9th	10th	11th	12th	13th	14th	15th	Pole	FL
Points	25	20	17	14	12	10	9	8	7	6	5	4	3	2	1	1	1

=== Overall ===
Pos.	Driver	SHA (China)		MOT (Japan)		SEP (Malaysia)			BAN (Thailand)		MAN (Indonesia)			MRN (Singapore)		Points	ECC	SCC
Pos.	Driver	R1	R2	R1	R2	R1	R2	R3	R1	R2	R1	R2	R3	R1	R2	Points	ECC	SCC
1	(Luxembourg) Dylan Pereira	4	1	1	1	1	1	1	1	1	3	6	1	1	1	317	133	108
2	(Italy) Enzo Trulli	1	Ret	4	4	10	3	2	6	3	2	2	Ret	4	5	215	83	53
3	(United Kingdom) Hugo Ellis	12	4	2	2	4	10	7	4	4	5	3	3	5	DNS	190	75	40
4	(Hong Kong) Dylan Yip	Ret	15	3	3	3	8	3	3	DNS	10	12	6	7	7	157	63	35
5	(Mozambique) Rodrigo Dias Almeida	6	2	5	6	6	13	DNS	2	DNS	9	5	7	10	6	155	42	36
6	(United Kingdom) Josh Rowledge	14	6	6	5	9	4	8	9	6	8	7	15	3	4	144	45	48
7	(New Zealand) Brock Gilchrist	2	3	WD	WD	5	5	6	5	2	6	4	19			143	58	32
8	(China) Bao Jinlong	23	9	9	8	12	9	9	7	5	11	9	8	9	15	106	36	29
9	(Malaysia) Amer Harris Jefry	3	7	7	7	8	7	DNS	8	DNS						74	17	8
10	(Hong Kong) Francis Tjia	9	17	15	12	20	14	14	13	9	12	13	9	12	Ret	66	19	14
11	(Thailand) Munkong Sathienthirakul	7	5	10	10	14	12	13	11	10						65	9	11
12	(Hong Kong) Eric Kwong	13	11	14	11	15	17	21	19	14	13	11	12	15	11	62	14	8
13	(Hong Kong) Henry Kwong	17	13	12	15	19	25	16	15	12	16	10	10	14	12	57	12	11
14	(China) Li Chao	16	14	11	13	18	15	15	14	7				Ret	13	42	2	14
15	(China) Li Xuanyu	11	10	8	9	17	16	12								42	4	0
16	(China) Yan Chuang	21	12	Ret	18	24	18	DNS	12	11	Ret	14	11	WD	WD	26	7	9
17	(China) Hu Bo	10	22	Ret	Ret	21	DNS	19	DNS	17	14	15	13	17	20	30	6	0
18	(China) Eric Zang	15	8						10	8						24	–	14
19	(Canada) Christian Chia	19	21	18	19	26	19	20	17	15	18	17	18	18	16	16	0	1
20	(Malaysia) Adrian D'Silva	18	18	17	17	22	22	DNS	20	19	17	16	17	22	17	15	0	0
21	(China) Wang Zhongwei	8	20			WD	WD	WD								9	0	–
22	(Hong Kong) John Shen	20	19	20	20	25	20	18	18	16	20	16	20	21	19	8	28	0
23	(China) Jacky Wu	22	23	16	21	23	Ret	DNS	21	18	19	19	16	Ret	18	7	0	0
24	(China) Xu Zhenfeng			13	Ret				16	13						6	–	3
Guest drivers ineligible to score points
—	(France) Marcus Amand										1	1	5			0	65	–
—	(New Zealand) Marco Giltrap					2	2	5								0	53	–
—	(Australia) Bayley Hall													2	3	0	–	37
—	(Australia) Dylan O'Keeffe										7	8	4	8	2	0	31	28
—	(Australia) Oscar Targett										4	Ret	2			0	34	–
—	(Malaysia) Nazim Azman					7	6	4								0	33	–
—	(China) Li Zhicong	5	16													0	–	–
—	(Singapore) Danial Frost													6	8	0	–	18
—	(Australia) Matthew Belford													11	9	0	–	12
—	(China) Cao Qikuan					16	11	10								0	11	–
—	(Australia) Dean Cook													13	10	0	–	9
—	(Indonesia) Daffa Ardiansa Boedihardjo					11	24	11								0	10	–
—	(Hong Kong) Liu Kai Shun					13	Ret	Ret								0	3	–
—	(Singapore) Roy Tien Foo Tang										15	Ret	14	20	21	0	3	0
—	(United States) Li Kerong													16	14	0	–	2
—	(China) Wu Jiaxin			Ret	14											0	–	–
—	(Indonesia) Hendrik Jaya Soewatdy			19	16											0	–	–
—	(Hong Kong) Chan Sye Wai					27	23	17								0	0	–
Pos.	Driver	R1	R2	R1	R2	R1	R2	R3	R1	R2	R1	R2	R3	R1	R2	Points	ECC	SCC
Pos.	Driver	SHA (China)		MOT (Japan)		SEP (Malaysia)			BAN (Thailand)		MAN (Indonesia)			MRN (Singapore)		Points	ECC	SCC

=== Pro-Am ===
Pos.	Driver	SHA (China)		MOT (Japan)		SEP (Malaysia)			BAN (Thailand)		MAN (Indonesia)			MRN (Singapore)		Points	ECC	SCC
Pos.	Driver	R1	R2	R1	R2	R1	R2	R3	R1	R2	R1	R2	R3	R1	R2	Points	ECC	SCC
1	(China) Bao Jinlong	6	2	2	1	1	1	1	1	1	2	1	1	1	5	308	151	95
2	(Hong Kong) Francis Tjia	2	5	4	3	5	2	3	3	4	1	2	2	3	Ret	218	114	48
3	(China) Li Chao	5	4	3	4	4	3	4	4	2				Ret	3	164	45	51
4	(China) Li Xuanyu	3	3	1	2	3	4	2								136	53	–
5	(China) Eric Zang	4	1						2	3						76	–	37
6	(China) Wang Zhongwei	1	6			WD	WD	WD								35	0	–
Guest drivers ineligible to score points
—	(Australia) Matthew Belford													2	1	0	–	45
—	(Australia) Dean Cook													4	2	0	–	34
—	(Hong Kong) Liu Kai Shun					2	Ret	Ret								0	22	–
—	(United States) Li Kerong													5	4	0	–	26
Pos.	Driver	R1	R2	R1	R2	R1	R2	R3	R1	R2	R1	R2	R3	R1	R2	Points	ECC	SCC
Pos.	Driver	SHA (China)		MOT (Japan)		SEP (Malaysia)			BAN (Thailand)		MAN (Indonesia)			MRN (Singapore)		Points	ECC	SCC

=== Am ===
Pos.	Driver	SHA (China)		MOT (Japan)		SEP (Malaysia)			BAN (Thailand)		MAN (Indonesia)			MRN (Singapore)		Points	ECC	SCC
Pos.	Driver	R1	R2	R1	R2	R1	R2	R3	R1	R2	R1	R2	R3	R1	R2	Points	ECC	SCC
1	(Hong Kong) Henry Kwong	4	4	2	4	4	7	3	3	3	4	1	1	1	2	240	108	81
2	(Hong Kong) Eric Kwong	3	2	4	2	2	3	6	5	5	1	2	3	2	1	236	111	69
3	(Thailand) Munkong Sathienthirakul	1	1	1	1	1	2	2	1	1						235	65	51
4	(China) Hu Bo	2	5	Ret	Ret	5	5	5	DNS	6	2	4	4	3	3	170	84	44
5	(China) Yan Chuang	5	3	Ret	6	6	4	DNS	2	2	Ret	3	2	4	Ret	168	61	59
6	(China) Xu Zhefeng			3	Ret				4	4						45	–	28
Guest drivers ineligible to score points
—	(China) Cao Qikuan					3	1	1								0	71	–
—	(Singapore) Roy Tien Foo Tang										3	Ret	5	5	4	0	29	26
—	(China) Wu Jiaxin			Ret	3											0	–	–
—	(Hong Kong) Chan Sye Wai					7	6	4								0	33	–
—	(Indonesia) Hendrik Jaya Soewatdy			5	5											0	–	–
Pos.	Driver	R1	R2	R1	R2	R1	R2	R3	R1	R2	R1	R2	R3	R1	R2	Points	ECC	SCC
Pos.	Driver	SHA (China)		MOT (Japan)		SEP (Malaysia)			BAN (Thailand)		MAN (Indonesia)			MRN (Singapore)		Points	ECC	SCC

=== Masters ===
Pos.	Driver	SHA (China)		MOT (Japan)		SEP (Malaysia)			BAN (Thailand)		MAN (Indonesia)			MRN (Singapore)		Points	ECC	SCC
Pos.	Driver	R1	R2	R1	R2	R1	R2	R3	R1	R2	R1	R2	R3	R1	R2	Points	ECC	SCC
1	(Malaysia) Adrian D'Silva	1	1	2	1	1	3	DNS	3	4	1	1	2	3	2	272	116	73
2	(Canada) Christian Chia	2	3	3	2	4	1	2	1	1	2	2	3	1	1	263	118	101
3	(Hong Kong) John Shen	3	2	4	3	3	2	1	2	2	4	3	4	2	4	225	111	74
4	(China) Jacky Wu	4	4	1	3	2	Ret	DNS	4	3	3	4	1	DNS	3	198	76	50
Pos.	Driver	R1	R2	R1	R2	R1	R2	R3	R1	R2	R1	R2	R3	R1	R2	Points	ECC	SCC
Pos.	Driver	SHA (China)		MOT (Japan)		SEP (Malaysia)			BAN (Thailand)		MAN (Indonesia)			MRN (Singapore)		Points	ECC	SCC

=== Dealer Trophy ===
Pos.	Team	Pts
1	(China) Team Shanghai Yonda BWT	269
2	(China) TORO Racing	206
3	(New Zealand) Sime Motors Racing	196
4	Team Porsche New Zealand	184
5	(China) Team Betterlife	176
6	(China) Team Jebsen	173
7	(China) Porsche Own Retail 69 Team	104

== See also ==
- 2025 Porsche Supercup
- 2025 Porsche Carrera Cup France
- 2025 Porsche Carrera Cup Germany
- 2025 Porsche Carrera Cup North America
- 2025 Porsche Carrera Cup Australia
- 2025 Porsche Carrera Cup Japan
