= Dylan Pereira =

Luxembourgish racing driver

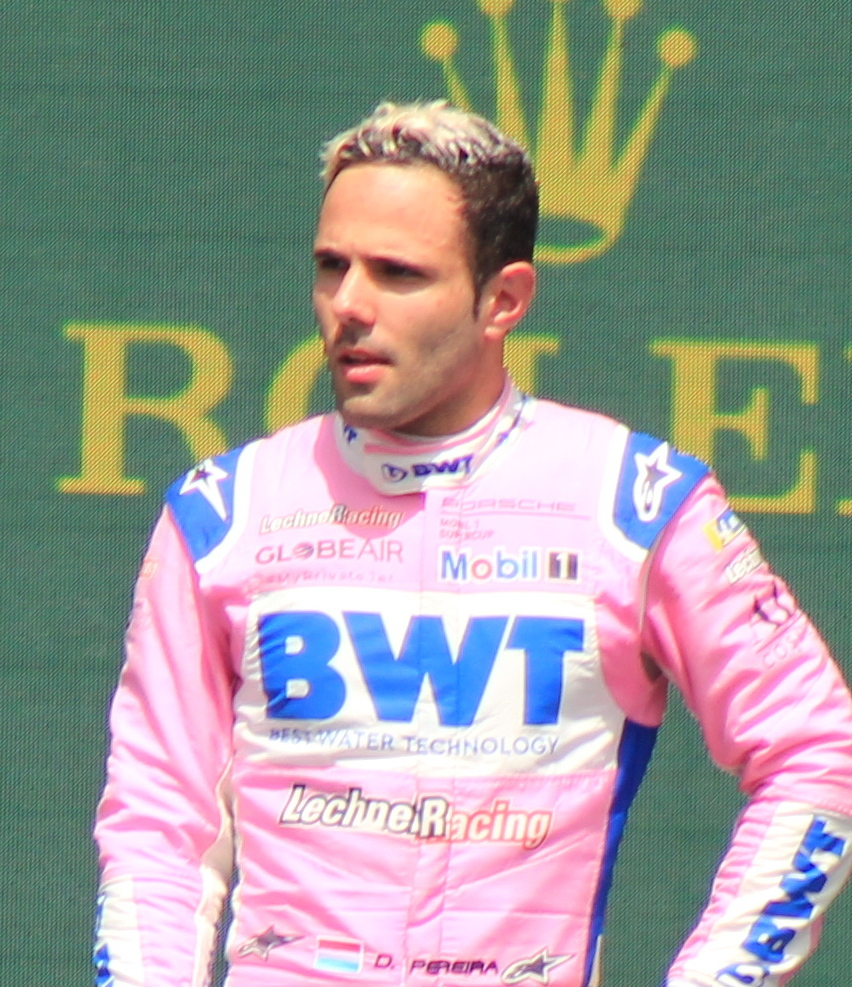
- Pereira in 2022
- Nationality: (Luxembourg) Luxembourger
- Born: 10 June 1997 (age 29) Luxembourg City, Luxembourg

Porsche Supercup
- Categorisation: FIA Silver (until 2021); FIA Gold (2022–)
- Years active: 2015–2022
- Teams: Lechner Racing
- Starts: 48
- Championships: 1 (2022)
- Wins: 4
- Poles: 2
- Fastest laps: 7
- Best finish: 1st in 2022

Previous series
- 2014–15 2016–19: Central European Volkswagen Golf Cup; Porsche Carrera Cup Germany

Dylan Pereira (born 10 June 1997) is a Portuguese-Luxembourgish racing driver. He started his career on sim racing (iRacing). A long-time Porsche driver, he was the champion of the 2022 Porsche Supercup. After winning the Porsche Supercup, he tied for the 2022 Luxembourgish Sportsman of the Year with Cyclist Bob Jungels with 370 votes apiece.

== Racing record ==
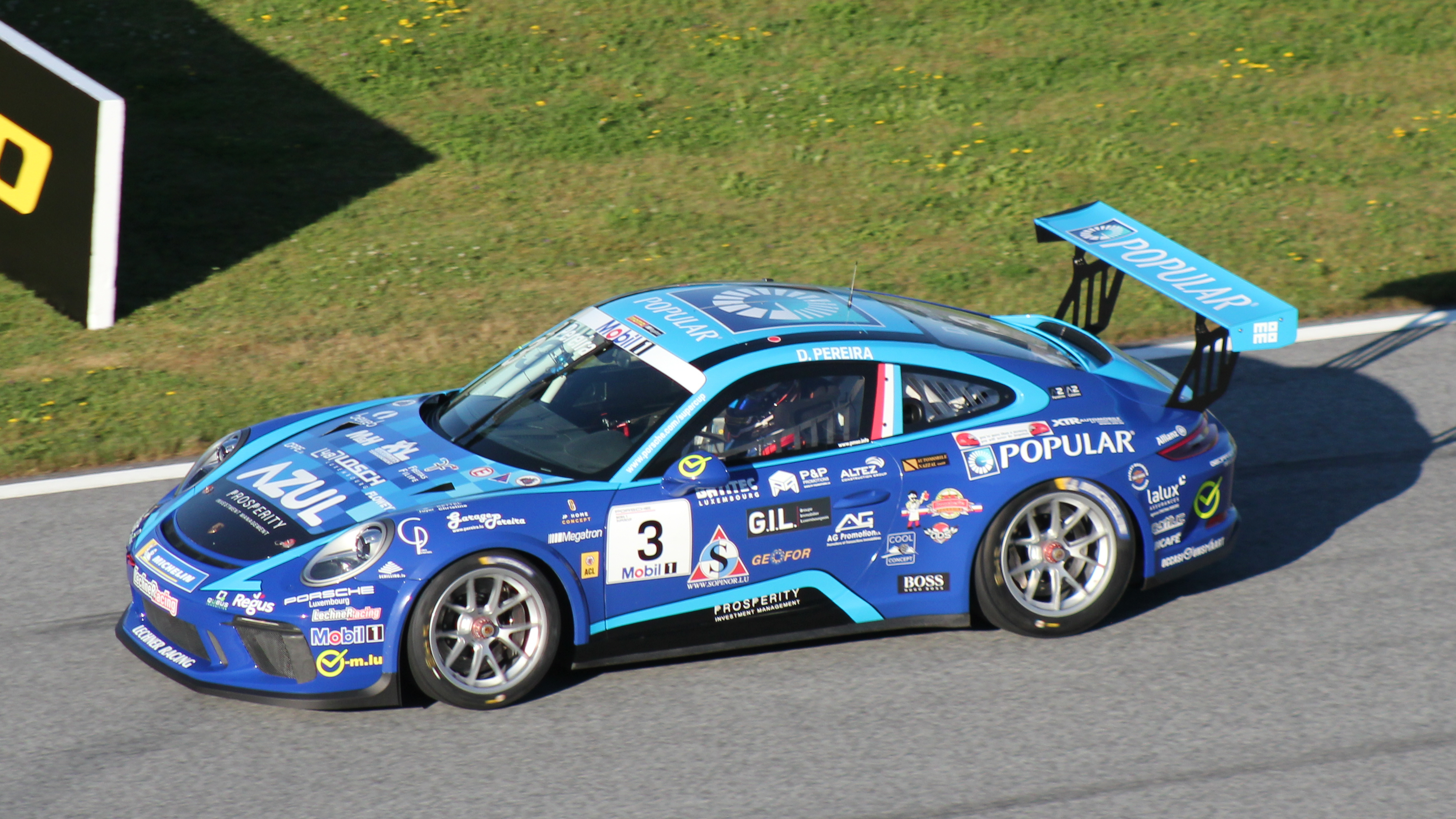
Pereira at the Red Bull Ring in 2019.

=== Racing career summary ===
Season	Series	Team	Races	Wins	Poles	F/Laps	Podiums	Points	Position
2014	Central European Volkswagen Golf Cup	N/A	14	0	0	0	0	261	11th
2015	Central European Volkswagen Golf Cup	N/A	12	4	5	1	8	454	**2nd**
2015	BMW M235i Racing Cup Belgium	DUWO Racing	2	0	1	0	0	17	34th
2015	24H Series - CUP1	DUWO Racing							
2015	Porsche Supercup	MOMO Megatron Team PARTRAX	1	0	0	0	0	0	NC†
2015	24H Series - A3T	R8 Motorsport							
2016	Porsche Carrera Cup Germany	MRS GT-Racing	2	0	0	0	0	13	12th
2016	24H Series - 991	MRS GT-Racing							
2016	Porsche Supercup	MOMO Megatron Team Partrax	10	0	0	0	0	35	13th
2016-17	Porsche GT3 Cup Challenge Middle East		12	0	1	1	4	211	**3rd**
2017	Porsche Carrera Cup Germany	Zele Racing	2	0	0	0	0	21	17th
2017	Porsche Supercup	Lechner Racing Middle East	9	0	0	1	3	84	8th
2017-18	Porsche GT3 Cup Challenge Middle East		6	3	3	3	5	119	11th
2018	Porsche Carrera Cup Germany	Lechner Racing	14	0	0	1	3	113	4th
2018	Porsche Supercup	Momo Megatron Lechner Racing Team	10	0	0	2	2	90	7th
2018-19	Porsche GT3 Cup Challenge Middle East		4	1	2	1	3	88	16th
2019	Porsche Carrera Cup Germany	Lechner Racing Team	16	0	0	3	9	181	4th
2019	Porsche Supercup	Momo Megatron Lechner Racing Team	10	2	1	1	2	73	9th
2019–20	Porsche GT3 Cup Challenge Middle East		6	3	3	4	6	142	7th
2019–20	FIA World Endurance Championship - LMGTE Am	Team Project 1	1	0	0	0	0	12	27th
2020	Porsche Carrera Cup Germany	Förch Racing	11	6	0	1	9	207	**2nd**
2020	Porsche Supercup	BWT Lechner Racing	8	2	1	4	6	148	**2nd**
2020	Intercontinental GT Challenge	Lechner Racing	1	0	0	0	0	1	21st
2020	24H GT Series - 991	DUWO Racing	1	0	0	1	1	24	6th
2021	FIA World Endurance Championship - LMGTE Am	TF Sport	6	1	2	1	3	90.5	**2nd**
2021	24 Hours of Le Mans - LMGTE Am	TF Sport	1	0	0	1	1	N/A	**2nd**
2021	ADAC GT Masters	KÜS Team Bernhard	8	0	0	0	0	27	27th
2021	Porsche Carrera Cup France	BWT Lechner Racing	4	0	0	2	3	38	15th
2021	Porsche Supercup	BWT Lechner Racing	8	1	1	0	2	71	7th
2021	24H GT Series - 991	DUWO Racing							
2021–22	Porsche Sprint Challenge Middle East	DHL Team	2	1	0	2	1	23.5	17th
2022	Porsche Supercup	BWT Lechner Racing	8	3	3	2	4	149	**1st**
2022	Porsche Carrera Cup Germany	IronForce Racing by Phoenix	16	4	2	2	9	240	**3rd**
2022	GT World Challenge Europe Endurance Cup	Herberth Motorsport	1	0	0	0	0	0	NC
2022	24H GT Series - GT3	DUWO Racing by Herberth Motorsport							
2022-23	Middle East Trophy - GT3	Tresor by Attempto Racing							
2023	GT World Challenge Europe Endurance Cup	Tresor Attempto Racing	5	0	0	0	0	0	NC
2023	Porsche Carrera Cup Scandinavia	Mtech Competition	1	1	1	1	1	0	NC†
2023	24 Hours of Nürburgring - Cup2	Clickversicherung Team	1	0	0	1	1	N/A	**2nd**
2023-24	Asian Le Mans Series - GT	Attempto Racing	5	0	0	0	1	20	14th
2023-24	Middle East Trophy - GT3	Attempto Racing							
2024	GT Winter Series - Cup2	RACAR Motorsport							
2024	GT World Challenge Europe Endurance Cup	Tresor Attempto Racing	4	0	0	0	0	8	23rd
2024	GT World Challenge Europe Sprint Cup	Tresor Attempto Racing	8	0	0	0	0	0	NC
2024	Porsche Carrera Cup Asia	Team Shanghai Yongda BWT	14	5	3	2	11	268	**2nd**
2024	Porsche Carrera Cup France	Martinet by Alméras	2	0	0	0	1	20	16th
2024	GT World Challenge Asia	Phantom Global Racing	2	0	0	?	0	0	NC†
2024	24 Hours of Nürburgring - Cup2	Scherer Sport PHX	1	0	0	0	1	N/A	**2nd**
2025	GT World Challenge Asia	EBM	2	0	0	0	0	0	NC
2025	Porsche Carrera Cup Asia	Team Shanghai Yongda BWT	14	11	8	12	12	317	**1st**
2025	GT World Challenge Europe Sprint Cup	Tresor Attempto Racing	8	0	0	0	0	0	NC
2025	GT World Challenge Europe Endurance Cup	Tresor Attempto Racing	1	0	0	0	0	0	NC
2025	Belcar Endurance Championship - GT Cup	RedAnt Racing							
2025	992 Endurance Cup	48 LOSCH Motorsport by BLACK FALCON							
2025	24 Hours of Nürburgring – Cup 2 Pro	48 LOSCH Motorsport by BLACK FALCON	1	1	0	0	1	—N/a	**1st**
2026	Nürburgring Langstrecken-Serie - SP9	48LOSCH Motorsport by Black Falcon							
2026	24 Hours of Nürburgring – SP9 Pro-Am	48LOSCH Motorsport by Black Falcon	1	1	0	0	1	N/A	**1st**
2026	Porsche Carrera Cup Japan	Sky Motorsports	1	0	0	0	1	8.5	16th
2026	GT World Challenge Europe Endurance Cup	Tresor Attempto Racing	5	0	0	0	0	6	29th
2026	GT World Challenge Europe Sprint Cup	Tresor Attempto Racing	10	1	0	0	1	25	12th
2026	Porsche Carrera Cup Asia	Absolute Racing	5	1	0	2	3	0	NC†
2026	Porsche Carrera Cup Brasil								
2026	992 Endurance Cup	AF Motorsport							

† As Pereira was a guest driver, he was ineligible to score points.

=== Complete Porsche Supercup results ===
(key) (Races in bold indicate pole position; races in italics indicate fastest lap)

Year	Team	1	2	3	4	5	6	7	8	9	10	11	Pos.	Points
2015	MOMO Megatron Team PARTRAX	CAT	MON	RBR	SIL	HUN	SPA	SPA	MNZ	MNZ	COA; C	COA; Ret	NC†	0
2016	MOMO-Megatron Team Partrax	CAT; 11	MON; 18	RBR; 25	SIL; 26	HUN; 12	HOC; 12	SPA; 15	MNZ; Ret	USA; 10	USA; 9		13th	35
2017	Lechner Racing Middle East	CAT; 8	CAT; 5	MON; Ret	RBR; 3	SIL; 3	HUN; 6	SPA; 10	SPA; 3	MNZ; Ret	MEX	MEX	8th	84
2018	Momo Megatron Lechner Racing Team	CAT; 3	MON; 3	RBR; 4	SIL; Ret	HOC; 5	HUN; 9	SPA; Ret	MNZ; 5	MEX; 10	MEX; 9		7th	90
2019	Momo Megatron Lechner Racing Team	CAT; 13	MON; Ret	RBR; 7	SIL; 12	HOC; 1	HUN; 5	**SPA**; 1	MNZ; 7	MEX; Ret	MEX; 4		9th	73
2020	BWT Lechner Racing	RBR; 2	RBR; 1	**HUN**; 1	SIL; 6	SIL; 3	CAT; 3	SPA; 2	MNZ; 4				2nd	148
2021	BWT Lechner Racing	MON; 11	RBR; 25	**RBR**; 2	HUN; 11	SPA; 1	ZND; 6	MNZ; 21	MNZ; 13				7th	71
2022	BWT Lechner Racing	**IMO**; 1	MON; 4	SIL; 4	**RBR**; 1	LEC; 4	**SPA**; 1	ZND; 2	MNZ; 5				1st	149

† As Pereira was a guest driver, he was ineligible for points.

=== Complete FIA World Endurance Championship results ===
(key) (Races in bold indicate pole position; races in italics indicate fastest lap)

Year	Entrant	Class	Chassis	Engine	1	2	3	4	5	6	7	8	Rank	Points
2019–20	Team Project 1	LMGTE Am	Porsche 911 RSR	Porsche 4.0 L Flat-6	SIL	FUJ	SHA	BHR	COA	SPA	LMS	BHR; 6	27th	12
2021	TF Sport	LMGTE Am	Aston Martin Vantage AMR	Aston Martin 4.0 L Turbo V8	**SPA**; 2	ALG; 7	**MNZ**; 12	LMS; 2	BHR; 1	BHR; Ret			2nd	90.5

=== Complete 24 Hours of Le Mans results ===
Year	Team	Co-Drivers	Car	Class	Laps	Pos.	Class Pos.
2021	(United Kingdom) TF Sport	(United States) Ben Keating (Brazil) Felipe Fraga	Aston Martin Vantage AMR	GTE; Am	339	26th	**2nd**

=== Complete GT World Challenge Europe results ===
==== GT World Challenge Europe Endurance Cup ====
(Races in bold indicate pole position) (Races in italics indicate fastest lap)

Year	Team	Car	Class	1	2	3	4	5	6	7	Pos.	Points
2022	Herberth Motorsport	Porsche 911 GT3 R	Pro-Am	IMO	LEC	SPA; 6H; 61	SPA; 12H; 61†	SPA; 24H; Ret	HOC	CAT	15th	6
2023	Tresor Attempto Racing	Audi R8 LMS Evo II	Bronze	MNZ; 31	LEC; 27	SPA; 6H; 43	SPA; 12H; 29	SPA; 24H; 28	NÜR; 31	CAT; 42	19th	19
2024	Tresor Attempto Racing	Audi R8 LMS Evo II	Bronze	LEC; Ret	SPA; 6H; 29	SPA; 12H; 3	SPA; 24H; 9	NÜR; Ret	MNZ	JED; Ret	9th	38
2025	Tresor Attempto Racing	Audi R8 LMS Evo II	Bronze	LEC	MNZ	SPA; 6H; 51	SPA; 12H; 63†	**SPA**; **24H**; Ret	NÜR	CAT	42nd	1
2026	Tresor Attempto Racing	Audi R8 LMS Evo II	Gold	LEC; Ret	**MNZ**; Ret	SPA; 6H; 65†	SPA; 12H; 65†	SPA; 24H; Ret	NÜR; 7	ALG; 30	10th	40

==== GT World Challenge Europe Sprint Cup ====
Year	Team	Car	Class	1	2	3	4	5	6	7	8	9	10	Pos.	Points
2024	Tresor Attempto Racing	Audi R8 LMS Evo II	Bronze	MIS; 1; 16	MIS; 2; 27	HOC; 1; 24	HOC; 2; 18	MAG; 1; 26	MAG; 2; 23	CAT; 1 Ret	CAT; 2; 25			5th	44
2025	Tresor Attempto Racing	Audi R8 LMS Evo II	Bronze	ZAN; 1; 25	ZAN; 2; 40	MIS; 1; 29	MIS; 2; 40	MAG; 1; 29	MAG; 2; 31	VAL; 1 Ret	VAL; 2; 29			9th	30
2026	Tresor Attempto Racing	Audi R8 LMS Evo II	Gold	**BRH**; **1** Ret	BRH; 2 Ret	**MIS**; **1**; 5	MIS; 2; 8	MAG; 1; 14	MAG; 2; 37	ZAN; 1; 14	ZAN; 2; 14	**CAT**; **1**; 1	CAT; 2; 10	2nd	90.5

=== Complete Porsche Carrera Cup Asia results ===
(key) (Races in bold indicate pole position; races in italics indicate points for the fastest lap of top ten finishers)

Year	Entrant	Class	1	2	3	4	5	6	7	8	9	10	11	12	13	14	15	16	DC	Points
2024	Team Shanghai Yongda BWT	Pro	**SIC**; **1**; 1	SIC; 2; 9	SUZ; 1; 2	SUZ; 2; 2	CHA; 1; 3	CHA; 2; 2	BAN; 1 DNS	BAN; 2 DNS	SEP; 1; 16	SEP; 2; 1	SEP; 3; 6	**MRN**; **1**; 1	MRN; 2; 1	**SIC**; **1**; 1	SIC; 2; 2	SIC; 3; 3	2nd	268
2025	Team Shanghai Yongda BWT	Pro	SIC; 1; 4	**SIC**; **2**; 1	MOT; 1; 1	**MOT**; **2**; 1	**SEP**; **1**; 1	**SEP**; **2**; 1	SEP; 3; 1	**BAN**; **1**; 1	**BAN**; **2**; 1	MAN; 1; 3	MAN; 2; 6	MAN; 3; 1	**MRN**; **1**; 1	**MRN**; **2**; 1			1st	317
