= Liang Jiatong =

Chinese racing driver (born 1992)

Liang Jiatong 梁嘉彤
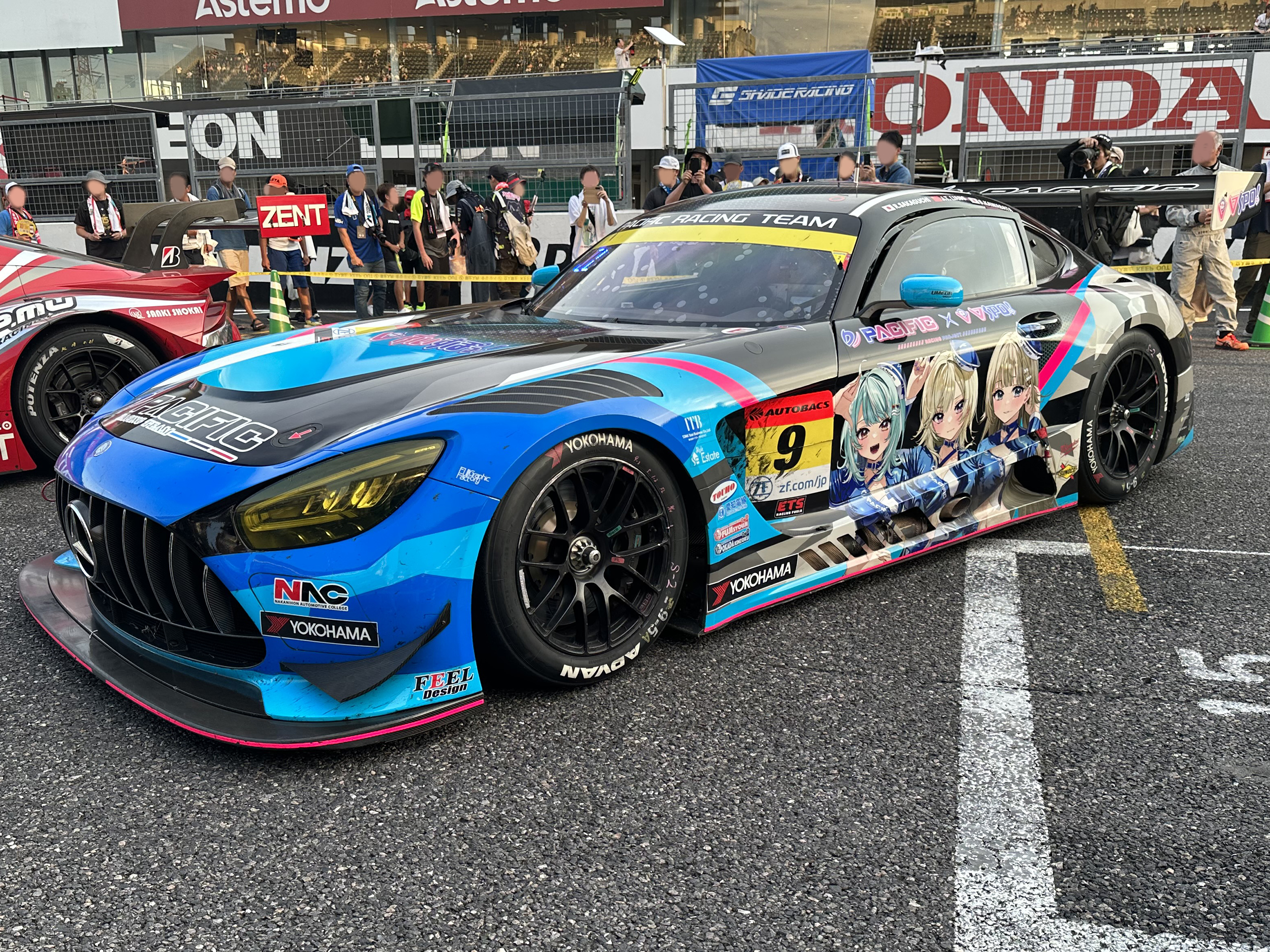
- Nationality: (China) Chinese
- Born: 14 January 1993 (age 33) Beijing, China

GT World Challenge Asia career
- Debut season: 2024
- Current team: Craft-Bamboo Racing
- Categorisation: FIA Silver
- Car number: 77
- Former teams: Harmony Racing
- Starts: 14
- Wins: 0
- Podiums: 1
- Poles: 0
- Fastest laps: 0

Previous series
- 2023 2016: Super GT - GT300; Euroformula Open

Liang Jiatong (Chinese: 梁嘉彤; pinyin: Liángjiātóng, born 14 January 1993), also known as Alex Liang, is a Chinese racing driver.

== Racing record ==
=== Career summary ===
Season	Series	Team	Races	Wins	Poles	F/Laps	Podiums	Points	Position
2016	Italian GT Championship - GTCup	Vincenzo Sospiri Racing	12	1	0	1	5	112	8th
2016	24H Series - SPX	Vincenzo Sospiri Racing							
2016	Euroformula Open Championship	Team West-Tec	4	0	0	0	0	0	28th
2017	Italian GT Championship - GTCup	Vincenzo Sospiri Racing	14	1	0	0	9	147	5th
2018	International GT Open	Imperiale Racing	14	0	0	1	0	8	30th
2018	Italian GT Championship - GT3	Imperiale Racing	8	0	0	1	0	27	20th
2019	International GT Open	Raton Racing by Target	11	0	0	0	0	18	17th
2022	China Endurance Championship - GT3	Harmony Racing							
2022	Greater Bay Area GT Cup	Harmony Racing	2	2	1	2	2	N/A	1st
2023	Super GT – GT300	Pacific Racing Team	7	0	0	0	0	0	NC
2023	Greater Bay Area GT Cup - GT4	Harmony Racing	1	0	0	0	1	N/A	3rd
2023	Lamborghini Super Trofeo Asia - Pro	Harmony Racing	4	0	0	0	3	42	4th
2024	Super Taikyu - ST-X	Craft-Bamboo Racing	5	2	2	0	0	110‡	2nd‡
2024	Circuit Hero - One - B	Harmony Racing	2	0	?	?	1	9	5th
2024	12 Hours of Sepang	Harmony Racing	1	0	0	0	0	N/A	12th
2024	Greater Bay Area GT Cup - GT4	Harmony Racing	1	0	0	1	0	N/A	5th
2024	GT World Challenge Asia	Harmony Racing	12	0	1	0	1	44	14th
2024	Lamborghini Super Trofeo Asia - Pro-Am	Harmony Racing	2	0	2	0	2	23	6th
2024	Lamborghini Super Trofeo Europe - Pro-Am	Leipert Motorsport							
2024	Gulf 12 Hours - 992	HRT Performance	1	0	0	0	1	N/A	2nd
2025	GT World Challenge Asia	Craft-Bamboo Racing							
2025	GT World Challenge Europe Endurance Cup	GRT - Grasser Racing Team	1	0	0	0	0	0	NC
2025	Middle East Trophy - GT3	Huber Motorsport							
2025	Lamborghini Super Trofeo Asia - Pro-Am	SQDA-GRIT Motorsport	10	4	2	0	8	121	3rd
2025	24H Series - GT3	ARC Bratislava							
2025	Shanghai 8 Hours - GTS	GAHA Racing						N/A	TBD
2025-26	24H Series Middle East - 992	Mühlner Motorsport							
2026	SRO GT Cup	KILOworks by LEVEL Motorsports	0	0	0	0	0	0*	TBD
2026	GT World Challenge Asia	Craft-Bamboo Racing	12	0	0	0	0	40	18th
2026	China GT Championship - GT3	Absolute Racing							
2026	Italian GT Championship Endurance Cup - GT3	AKM Motorsport	2	0	0	0	0	0	NC†
2026	24H Series - GT3	Juta Racing	1	0	0	0	0	19	35th

‡ Team standings

=== Complete Super GT results ===
Year	Team	Car	Class	1	2	3	4	5	6	7	8	DC	Points
2023	Pacific Racing Team	Mercedes-AMG GT3 Evo	GT300	OKA; 23†	FUJ; WD	SUZ; 25	FUJ; 22	SUZ; 11	SUG; 17	AUT; 23	MOT; 19	NC	0

Sporting positions
Preceded by Chang Chien Shang	Greater Bay Area GT Cup; Winner; 2022	Succeeded by Darryl O'Young (GT3); Christodoulou Adam Robert (GT4)
