= 2026 Porsche Sprint Challenge Southern Europe =

The 2026 Porsche Sprint Challenge Southern Europe is a multi-event, one-make motor racing championship held across Europe. The championship featured a mix of professional motor racing teams and privately funded drivers. The 2026 season is the 4th season, the season began on 24 January 2026 at Portimão and will be finished on 28 February at Barcelona.

== Calendar ==
Round	Circuit	Date
1	(Portugal) Algarve International Circuit, Portimão	24–25 January
2	(Portugal) Circuito do Estoril, Estoril	30–31 January
3	(Spain) Circuit Ricardo Tormo, Cheste	20–21 February
4	(Spain) Circuit de Barcelona-Catalunya, Montmeló	27–28 February

== Race results ==
Round	Circuit	Sport winner	Club winner	GT4 Winner
1	(Portugal) Algarve	(Netherlands) Wouter Boerekamps	(Dominican Republic) Joel Monegro	(United Kingdom) Daniel Lewis
1	(Portugal) Algarve	(New Zealand) Marco Giltrap	(Dominican Republic) Joel Monegro	(United Kingdom) Daniel Lewis
2	(Portugal) Estoril	(Netherlands) Milan Marczak (Note: Marczak is Polish, but competes under a Dutch license.)	(Dominican Republic) Joel Monegro	(United Kingdom) Daniel Lewis
2	(Portugal) Estoril	(Netherlands) Milan Marczak	(Dominican Republic) Joel Monegro	(United Kingdom) Daniel Lewis
3	(Spain) Valencia	(Netherlands) Milan Marczak	(Venezuela) Javier Ripoll Jr.	(United Kingdom) Daniel Lewis
3	(Spain) Valencia	(Netherlands) Milan Marczak	(Dominican Republic) Joel Monegro	(United Kingdom) Daniel Lewis
4	(Spain) Barcelona	(Brazil) Matheus Ferreira	(Belgium) Olivier Bertels	(United Kingdom) Daniel Lewis
4	(Spain) Barcelona	(Brazil) Matheus Ferreira	(Venezuela) Javier Ripoll Jr.	(United Kingdom) Daniel Lewis
