= 2024 Lamborghini Super Trofeo Asia =

International motor racing series

The 2024 Lamborghini Super Trofeo Asia was the eleventh season of the Lamborghini Super Trofeo Asia. The season began on 3 May at Sepang International Circuit, and ended on 15 November with the World Final at Jerez, featuring 6 rounds.

== Calendar ==
The calendar for the 2024 season was released on 2 November 2023, featuring six rounds. On 18 November, Lamborghini announced that they will hold the World Finals at Jerez.

Rnd.	Circuit	Date	Supporting
1	Sepang International Circuit, Selangor, Malaysia	3–5 May	TCR Asia Series
2	The Bend Motorsport Park, South Australia, Australia	7–9 June	Australian Formula Open; Formula 4 Australian Championship
3	Inje Speedium, Gangwon Province, South Korea	19–21 July	Stand-alone event
4	Fuji Speedway, Shizuoka Prefecture, Japan	16–18 August	Fuji Champion Race Series
5	Shanghai International Circuit, Shanghai, China	13–15 September	GT World Challenge Asia; F4 Chinese Championship
6	Circuito de Jerez, Andalusia, Spain	14–15 November	Stand-alone event
7	Circuito de Jerez, Andalusia, Spain	16–17 November	Lamborghini Super Trofeo World Final

== Entry list ==
All teams use the Lamborghini Huracán Super Trofeo Evo2.

Team	No.	Drivers	Class	Rounds
(Hong Kong) Blackjack Racing	2	(China) Zhi Cong Li	P	1, 5
(Australia) JAM Motorsport	3	(Australia) John Paul Drake	LC	2
(Australia) JAM Motorsport	3	(Australia) Mark Pearce	LC	2
(Hong Kong) Absolute Racing (Note: Car No. 5 is entered as HZO Fortis Racing Team by Absolute Racing, car No. 63 is entered as SQDA-GRIT Motorsport, cars No. 24 and No. 84 are entered as Absolute Racing and car No. 95 is entered as 610 Racing Team by Absolute Racing.) (Hong Kong) 610Racing by Absolute Racing (Malaysia) HZO Fortis Racing Team by Absolute Racing (South Korea) SQDA - GRIT Motorsport	5	(Malaysia) Hairie Zairel Oh	LC	All
(Hong Kong) Absolute Racing (Hong Kong) 610Racing by Absolute Racing (Malaysia) HZO Fortis Racing Team by Absolute Racing (South Korea) SQDA - GRIT Motorsport	5	(Malaysia) Haziq Zairel Oh	LC	All
(Hong Kong) Absolute Racing (Hong Kong) 610Racing by Absolute Racing (Malaysia) HZO Fortis Racing Team by Absolute Racing (South Korea) SQDA - GRIT Motorsport	24	(Australia) Yasser Shahin	Am	4
(Hong Kong) Absolute Racing (Hong Kong) 610Racing by Absolute Racing (Malaysia) HZO Fortis Racing Team by Absolute Racing (South Korea) SQDA - GRIT Motorsport	63	(South Korea) Changwoo Lee	Am	All
(Hong Kong) Absolute Racing (Hong Kong) 610Racing by Absolute Racing (Malaysia) HZO Fortis Racing Team by Absolute Racing (South Korea) SQDA - GRIT Motorsport	84	(New Zealand) Marco Giltrap	P	1–2
(Hong Kong) Absolute Racing (Hong Kong) 610Racing by Absolute Racing (Malaysia) HZO Fortis Racing Team by Absolute Racing (South Korea) SQDA - GRIT Motorsport	84	(New Zealand) Clay Osborne	P	1–2
(Hong Kong) Absolute Racing (Hong Kong) 610Racing by Absolute Racing (Malaysia) HZO Fortis Racing Team by Absolute Racing (South Korea) SQDA - GRIT Motorsport	84	(New Zealand) Chris van der Drift	P	3–4
(Hong Kong) Absolute Racing (Hong Kong) 610Racing by Absolute Racing (Malaysia) HZO Fortis Racing Team by Absolute Racing (South Korea) SQDA - GRIT Motorsport	95	(China) Xuanyu Li	Am	1–5
(Hong Kong) Absolute Racing (Hong Kong) 610Racing by Absolute Racing (Malaysia) HZO Fortis Racing Team by Absolute Racing (South Korea) SQDA - GRIT Motorsport	95	(China) Wenjun Xie	Am	1–5
(Hong Kong) Madness Racing Team	6	(Hong Kong) Kai Shun Liu	PA	4
(Hong Kong) Madness Racing Team	6	(China) Lu Wei	PA	4
(Hong Kong) Madness Racing Team	77	(China) Xinyang He	Am	All
(Hong Kong) Madness Racing Team	77	(China) Shijie Hong	Am	All
(Hong Kong) Madness Racing Team	88	(China) Fangping Chen	PA	1–3, 5–6
(Hong Kong) Madness Racing Team	88	(Macau) André Couto	PA	1–3, 5–6
(South Korea) Vortex Racegraph	7	(China) Haowen Luo	Am	All
(South Korea) Vortex Racegraph	7	(China) Jiajun Song	Am	All
(Thailand) YK Motorsports by Star Performance	9	(Thailand) Nattanid Leewattanavalagul	Am	All
(Thailand) YK Motorsports by Star Performance	9	(Thailand) Dechathorn Phuakkarawut	Am	All
(Malaysia) Arrows Racing	8	(Hong Kong) Samson Chan	LC	1, 5
(Malaysia) Arrows Racing	8	(Chinese Taipei) Steven Chian	LC	1, 4
(Malaysia) Arrows Racing	8	(Malaysia) Jazeman Jaafar	PA	2–6
(Malaysia) Arrows Racing	8	(Malaysia) Selim Rafique	PA	2–6
(Malaysia) Arrows Racing	11	(Monaco) Jonathan Cecotto	P	All
(Malaysia) Arrows Racing	11	(Chinese Taipei) Gavin Huang	P	All
(Malaysia) Arrows Racing	51	(Chinese Taipei) Johnson Huang	Am	All
(Malaysia) Arrows Racing	51	(Chinese Taipei) Vincent Tai	Am	1, 3–6
(Malaysia) Arrows Racing	83	(Hong Kong) Chi Min Ma	LC	4–6
(Malaysia) Arrows Racing	98	(Chinese Taipei) Steven Chian	LC	4–5
(China) Harmony Racing	27	(China) Liang Jiatong	PA	4
(China) Harmony Racing	27	(Kyrgyzstan) Stanislav Minskiy	PA	4
(Hong Kong) Champion Motor Sport	28	(Hong Kong) Ka Hing Tse	P	5
(Italy) SJM Iron Lynx Theodore Racing	32	(Japan) Miki Koyama	P	All
(Italy) SJM Iron Lynx Theodore Racing	32	(Macau) Hon Chio Leong	P	All
(Italy) SJM Iron Lynx Theodore Racing	33	(Malaysia) Kumar Prabakaran	LC	1–4, 6
(Australia) DW Evans GT	56	(Chinese Taipei) Thomas Lee	PA	All
(Australia) DW Evans GT	56	(Finland) Nikolas Pirttilahti	PA	All
(Australia) DW Evans GT	65	(France) Emilien Carde	P	1–4
(Australia) DW Evans GT	65	(United Kingdom) Dan Wells	P	All
(Hong Kong) Kamlung Racing	68	(Hong Kong) Bertram Lau	PA	4, 6
(Hong Kong) Kamlung Racing	68	(Hong Kong) Kenneth Lau	PA	4, 6
(Thailand) Siamgas Corse	71	(Thailand) Supachai Weeraborwornpong	LC	All
True Visions Motorsports Thailand	78	(Thailand) Suttiluck Buncharoen	Am	1–5
(Australia) D1 Racing Team	93	(Australia) Tony D'Alberto	PA	2
(Australia) D1 Racing Team	93	(Australia) Adrian Deitz	PA	2
(Japan) Promotion Racing	99	(Japan) Shunsuke Kohno	P	4
(Japan) Promotion Racing	99	(Japan) Yuya Motojima	P	4

Icon	Class
P	Pro Cup
PA	Pro-Am Cup
Am	Am Cup
LC	Lamborghini Cup
	Guest Starter

== Race results ==
Round		Circuit	Pole position	Pro Winners	Pro-Am Winners	Am Winners	LC Winners
1	R1	(Malaysia) Sepang International Circuit	(Hong Kong) No. 84 Absolute Racing	(Hong Kong) No. 84 Absolute Racing	(Hong Kong) No. 88 Madness Racing Team	(Thailand) No. 9 YK Motorsports by Star Performance	(Malaysia) No. 5 HZO Fortis Racing Team by Absolute Racing
1	R1	(Malaysia) Sepang International Circuit	(New Zealand) Marco Giltrap (New Zealand) Clay Osborne	(New Zealand) Marco Giltrap (New Zealand) Clay Osborne	(China) Fangping Chen (Macau) André Couto	(Thailand) Nattanid Leewattanavalagul (Thailand) Dechathorn Phuakkarawut	(Malaysia) Hairie Zairel Oh (Malaysia) Haziq Zairel Oh
1	R2	(Malaysia) Sepang International Circuit	(Hong Kong) No. 2 Blackjack Racing	(Hong Kong) No. 84 Absolute Racing	(Hong Kong) No. 88 Madness Racing Team	(South Korea) No. 63 SQDA - GRIT Motorsport	(Malaysia) No. 5 HZO Fortis Racing Team by Absolute Racing
1	R2	(Malaysia) Sepang International Circuit	(China) Zhi Cong Li	(New Zealand) Marco Giltrap (New Zealand) Clay Osborne	(China) Fangping Chen (Macau) André Couto	(South Korea) Changwoo Lee	(Malaysia) Hairie Zairel Oh (Malaysia) Haziq Zairel Oh
2	R1	(Australia) The Bend Motorsport Park	(Hong Kong) No. 84 Absolute Racing	(Australia) No. 65 DW Evans GT	(Australia) No. 93 D1 Racing Team	(Thailand) No. 9 YK Motorsports by Star Performance	(Malaysia) No. 5 HZO Fortis Racing Team by Absolute Racing
2	R1	(Australia) The Bend Motorsport Park	(New Zealand) Marco Giltrap (New Zealand) Clay Osborne	(France) Emilien Carde (United Kingdom) Dan Wells	(Australia) Tony D'Alberto (Australia) Adrian Deitz	(Thailand) Nattanid Leewattanavalagul (Thailand) Dechathorn Phuakkarawut	(Malaysia) Hairie Zairel Oh (Malaysia) Haziq Zairel Oh
2	R2	(Australia) The Bend Motorsport Park	(Hong Kong) No. 84 Absolute Racing	(Hong Kong) No. 84 Absolute Racing	(Hong Kong) No. 88 Madness Racing Team	(South Korea) No. 63 SQDA - GRIT Motorsport	(Malaysia) No. 5 HZO Fortis Racing Team by Absolute Racing
2	R2	(Australia) The Bend Motorsport Park	(New Zealand) Marco Giltrap (New Zealand) Clay Osborne	(New Zealand) Marco Giltrap (New Zealand) Clay Osborne	(China) Fangping Chen (Macau) André Couto	(South Korea) Changwoo Lee	(Malaysia) Hairie Zairel Oh (Malaysia) Haziq Zairel Oh
3	R1	(South Korea) Inje Speedium	(Hong Kong) No. 84 Absolute Racing	(Hong Kong) No. 84 Absolute Racing	(Hong Kong) No. 88 Madness Racing Team	(Thailand) No. 9 YK Motorsports by Star Performance	(Thailand) No. 71 Siamgas Corse
3	R1	(South Korea) Inje Speedium	(New Zealand) Chris van der Drift	(New Zealand) Chris van der Drift	(China) Fangping Chen (Macau) André Couto	(Thailand) Nattanid Leewattanavalagul (Thailand) Dechathorn Phuakkarawut	(Thailand) Supachai Weeraborwornpong
3	R2	(South Korea) Inje Speedium	(Hong Kong) No. 84 Absolute Racing	(Hong Kong) No. 84 Absolute Racing	(Hong Kong) No. 88 Madness Racing Team	(South Korea) No. 63 SQDA - GRIT Motorsport	(Malaysia) No. 5 HZO Fortis Racing Team by Absolute Racing
3	R2	(South Korea) Inje Speedium	(New Zealand) Chris van der Drift	(New Zealand) Chris van der Drift	(China) Fangping Chen (Macau) André Couto	(South Korea) Changwoo Lee	(Malaysia) Hairie Zairel Oh (Malaysia) Haziq Zairel Oh
4	R1	(Japan) Fuji Speedway	(Japan) No. 99 Promotion Racing	(Hong Kong) No. 84 Absolute Racing	(Malaysia) No. 8 Arrows Racing	(South Korea) No. 63 SQDA - GRIT Motorsport	(Malaysia) No. 5 HZO Fortis Racing Team by Absolute Racing
4	R1	(Japan) Fuji Speedway	(Japan) Shunsuke Kohno (Japan) Yuja Motojima	(New Zealand) Chris van der Drift	(Malaysia) Jazeman Jaafar (Malaysia) Selim Rafique	(South Korea) Changwoo Lee	(Malaysia) Hairie Zairel Oh (Malaysia) Haziq Zairel Oh
4	R2	(Japan) Fuji Speedway	(Hong Kong) No. 84 Absolute Racing	(Australia) No. 65 DW Evans GT	(Hong Kong) No. 6 Madness Racing Team	(South Korea) No. 63 SQDA - GRIT Motorsport	(Malaysia) No. 5 HZO Fortis Racing Team by Absolute Racing
4	R2	(Japan) Fuji Speedway	(New Zealand) Chris van der Drift	(France) Emilien Carde (United Kingdom) Dan Wells	(Hong Kong) Kai Shun Liu (China) Lu Wei	(South Korea) Changwoo Lee	(Malaysia) Hairie Zairel Oh (Malaysia) Haziq Zairel Oh
5	R1	(China) Shanghai International Circuit	(Malaysia) No. 11 Arrows Racing	(Malaysia) No. 11 Arrows Racing	(Malaysia) No. 8 Arrows Racing	(South Korea) No. 63 SQDA - GRIT Motorsport	(Malaysia) No. 5 HZO Fortis Racing Team by Absolute Racing
5	R1	(China) Shanghai International Circuit	(Monaco) Jonathan Cecotto (Chinese Taipei) Gavin Huang	(Monaco) Jonathan Cecotto (Chinese Taipei) Gavin Huang	(Malaysia) Jazeman Jaafar (Malaysia) Selim Rafique	(South Korea) Changwoo Lee	(Malaysia) Hairie Zairel Oh (Malaysia) Haziq Zairel Oh
5	R2	(China) Shanghai International Circuit	(Hong Kong) No. 95 610Racing by Absolute Racing	(Australia) No. 65 DW Evans GT	(Hong Kong) No. 88 Madness Racing Team	(South Korea) No. 63 SQDA - GRIT Motorsport	(Thailand) No. 71 Siamgas Corse
5	R2	(China) Shanghai International Circuit	(China) Xuanyu Li (China) Wenjun Xie	(United Kingdom) Dan Wells	(China) Fangping Chen (Macau) André Couto	(South Korea) Changwoo Lee	(Thailand) Supachai Weeraborwornpong
6	R1	(Spain) Circuito de Jerez	(Malaysia) No. 11 Arrows Racing	(Malaysia) No. 11 Arrows Racing	(Malaysia) No. 8 Arrows Racing	(South Korea) No. 63 SQDA - GRIT Motorsport	(Malaysia) No. 5 HZO Fortis Racing Team by Absolute Racing
6	R1	(Spain) Circuito de Jerez	(Monaco) Jonathan Cecotto (Chinese Taipei) Gavin Huang	(Monaco) Jonathan Cecotto (Chinese Taipei) Gavin Huang	(Malaysia) Jazeman Jaafar (Malaysia) Selim Rafique	(South Korea) Changwoo Lee	(Malaysia) Hairie Zairel Oh (Malaysia) Haziq Zairel Oh
6	R2	(Spain) Circuito de Jerez	(Malaysia) No. 11 Arrows Racing	(Australia) No. 65 DW Evans GT	(Australia) No. 56 DW Evans GT	(South Korea) No. 63 SQDA - GRIT Motorsport	(Malaysia) No. 5 HZO Fortis Racing Team by Absolute Racing
6	R2	(Spain) Circuito de Jerez	(Monaco) Jonathan Cecotto	(France) Emilien Carde (United Kingdom) Dan Wells	(United States) Thomas Lee (Finland) Nikolas Pirttilahti	(South Korea) Changwoo Lee	(Malaysia) Hairie Zairel Oh (Malaysia) Haziq Zairel Oh

== Championship standings ==
=== Scoring system ===
Position	1st	2nd	3rd	4th	5th	6th	7th	8th	9th	10th	Pole
Points	15	12	10	8	6	5	4	3	2	1	1

=== Pro ===
Pos.	Driver	Team	(Malaysia) SEP		(Australia) BEN		(South Korea) INJ		(Japan) FUJ		(China) SHA		(Spain) JER		Pts
Pos.	Driver	Team	R1	R2	R1	R2	R1	R2	R1	R2	R1	R2	R1	R2	Pts
1	(United Kingdom) Dan Wells	(Australia) DW Evans GT	5	3	1	2	3	4	3	1	2	1	2	1	141
2	(Japan) Miki Koyama (Macau) Hon Chio Leong	(Italy) SJM Iron Lynx Theodore Racing	2	2	3	3	2	3	5	2	4	3	3	2	127
3	(Chinese Taipei) Gavin Huang (Monaco) Jonathan Cecotto	(Malaysia) Arrows Racing	3	4	2	4	4	2	2	Ret	1	2	1	3	114
4	(France) Emilien Carde	(Australia) DW Evans GT	5	3	1	2	3	4	3	1					113
5	(New Zealand) Chris van der Drift	(Hong Kong) Absolute Racing					1	1	1	3					59
6	(New Zealand) Marco Giltrap (New Zealand) Clay Osborne	(Hong Kong) Absolute Racing	1	1	4	1									56
7	(China) Zhi Cong Li	(Hong Kong) Blackjack Racing	4	5							3	4			33
Guest drivers ineligible to score points
–	(Japan) Shunsuke Kohno (Japan) Yuya Motojima	(Japan) Promotion Racing							4	4 (Note: Even though pole position for Race 2 at Fuji Speedway was scored by Promotion Racing, the points for pole were awarded to Chris van der Drift.)					–
Pos.	Driver	Team	(Malaysia) SEP		(Australia) BEN		(South Korea) INJ		(Japan) FUJ		(China) SHA		(Spain) JER1		Pts

=== Pro-Am ===
Pos.	Driver	Team	(Malaysia) SEP		(Australia) BEN		(South Korea) INJ		(Japan) FUJ		(China) SHA		(Spain) JER		Pts
Pos.	Driver	Team	R1	R2	R1	R2	R1	R2	R1	R2	R1	R2	R1	R2	Pts
1	(China) Fangping Chen (Macau) André Couto	(Hong Kong) Madness Racing Team	1	1	2	1	1	1			2	1	2	3	140
2	(Chinese Taipei) Thomas Lee (Finland) Nikolas Pirttilahti	(Australia) DW Evans GT	2	2	3	3	2	2	2	2	3	2	Ret	1	134
3	(Malaysia) Jazeman Jaafar (Malaysia) Selim Rafique	(Malaysia) Arrows Racing			4	2	3	3	1	4	1	3	1	2	121
4	(Hong Kong) Bertram Lau (Hong Kong) Kenneth Lau	(Hong Kong) Kamlung Racing							5	5			Ret	4	40
5	(Australia) Tony D'Alberto (Australia) Adrian Deitz	(Australia) D1 Racing Team			1	4									24
6	(China) Liang Jiatong (Kyrgyzstan) Stanislav Minskiy	(China) Harmony Racing							4	3					23
Guest drivers ineligible to score points
–	(Hong Kong) Kai Shun Liu (China) Lu Wei	(Hong Kong) Madness Racing Team							3	1					–
Pos.	Driver	Team	R1	R2	R1	R2	R1	R2	R1	R2	R1	R2	R1	R2	Pts
Pos.	Driver	Team	(Malaysia) SEP		(Australia) BEN		(South Korea) INJ		(Japan) FUJ		(China) SHA		(Spain) JER		Pts

=== Am ===
Pos.	Driver	Team	(Malaysia) SEP		(Australia) BEN		(South Korea) INJ		(Japan) FUJ		(China) SHA		(Spain) JER		Pts
Pos.	Driver	Team	R1	R2	R1	R2	R1	R2	R1	R2	R1	R2	R1	R2	Pts
1	(South Korea) Changwoo Lee	(South Korea) SQDA-GRIT Motorsport	2	1	Ret	1	2	1	1	1	1	1	1	1	166
2	(Thailand) Nattanid Leewattanavalagul (Thailand) Dechathorn Phuakkarawut	(Thailand) YK Motorsports by Star Performance	1	2	2	2	1	2	2	3	2	4	2	3	142
3	(China) Xinyang He (China) Shijie Hong	(Hong Kong) Madness Racing Team	4	3	4	Ret	4	3	4	6	3	2	4	2	101
4	(China) Haowen Luo (China) Jiajun Song	(South Korea) Vortex Racegraph	7	7	5	6	5	4	7	4	5	3	3	5	78
5	(China) Xuanyu Li (China) Wenjun Xie	(Hong Kong) 610Racing by Absolute Racing	5	4	3	4	6	5	3	2	Ret	Ret	5	Ret	74
6	(Chinese Taipei) Johnson Huang	(Malaysia) Arrows Racing	6	5	1	5	Ret	7	5	7	4	5	Ret	4	68
7	(Thailand) Suttiluck Buncharoen	True Visions Motorsports Thailand	3	6	Ret	3	3	6	8	5	6	6			60
8	(Chinese Taipei) Vincent Tai	(Malaysia) Arrows Racing	6	5			Ret	7	5	7	4	5	Ret	4	47
Guest drivers ineligible to score points
–	(Australia) Yasser Shahin	(Hong Kong) Absolute Racing							6	Ret					–
Pos.	Driver	Team	R1	R2	R1	R2	R1	R2	R1	R2	R1	R2	R1	R2	Pts
Pos.	Driver	Team	(Malaysia) SEP		(Australia) BEN		(South Korea) INJ		(Japan) FUJ		(China) SHA		(Spain) JER		Pts

=== Lamborghini Cup ===
Pos.	Driver	Team	(Malaysia) SEP		(Australia) BEN		(South Korea) INJ		(Japan) FUJ		(China) SHA		(Spain) JER		Pts
Pos.	Driver	Team	R1	R2	R1	R2	R1	R2	R1	R2	R1	R2	R1	R2	Pts
1	(Malaysia) Hairie Zairel Oh (Malaysia) Haziq Zairel Oh	(Malaysia) HZO Fortis Racing Team by Absolute Racing	1	1	1	1	3	1	1	1	1	Ret	1	1	168
2	(Thailand) Supachai Weeraborwornpong	(Thailand) Siamgas Corse	2	2	3	3	1	3	2	2	2	1	3	2	150
3	(Malaysia) Kumar Prabakaran	(Italy) SJM Iron Lynx Theodore Racing	Ret	3	4	4	2	2	Ret	3			2	3	86
4	(Hong Kong) Chi Min Ma	(Malaysia) Arrows Racing							4	4	4	3	4	4	50
5	(Hong Kong) Samson Chan	(Malaysia) Arrows Racing	3	4							3	2			40
6	(Chinese Taipei) Steven Chian	(Malaysia) Arrows Racing	3	4					3	5					34
Guest drivers ineligible to score points
–	(Australia) JP Drake (Australia) Mark Pearce	(Australia) JAM Motorsport			2 (Note: Even though pole position for Race 1 at The Bend was scored by JAM Motorsport, the points for pole were awarded to HZO Fortis Racing Team by Absolute Racing.)	2									–
Pos.	Driver	Team	R1	R2	R1	R2	R1	R2	R1	R2	R1	R2	R1	R2	Pts
Pos.	Driver	Team	(Malaysia) SEP		(Australia) BEN		(South Korea) INJ		(Japan) FUJ		(China) SHA		(Spain) JER		Pts

=== Teams ===
Pos.	Team	Points
1	(Australia) DW Evans GT	127
2	(Malaysia) Arrows Racing	114
3	(Hong Kong) Absolute Racing	107
4	(Italy) SJM Iron Lynx Theodore Racing	106
5	(South Korea) SQDA-GRIT Motorsport	89
6	(Hong Kong) Madness Racing Team	57
7	(Thailand) YK Motorsports by Star Performance	51
8	(Hong Kong) Blackjack Racing	26
9	(Hong Kong) 610Racing by Absolute Racing	12
10	(South Korea) Vortex Racegraph	9
11	(Malaysia) HZO Fortis Racing Team by Absolute Racing	9
12	(Australia) D1 Racing Team	8
13	True Visions Motorsports Thailand	5
14	(China) Harmony Racing	3
15	(Thailand) Siamgas Corse	2
