= Lü Wei (racing driver) =

Chinese and Canadian racing driver (born 1986)

Lü Wei 吕威
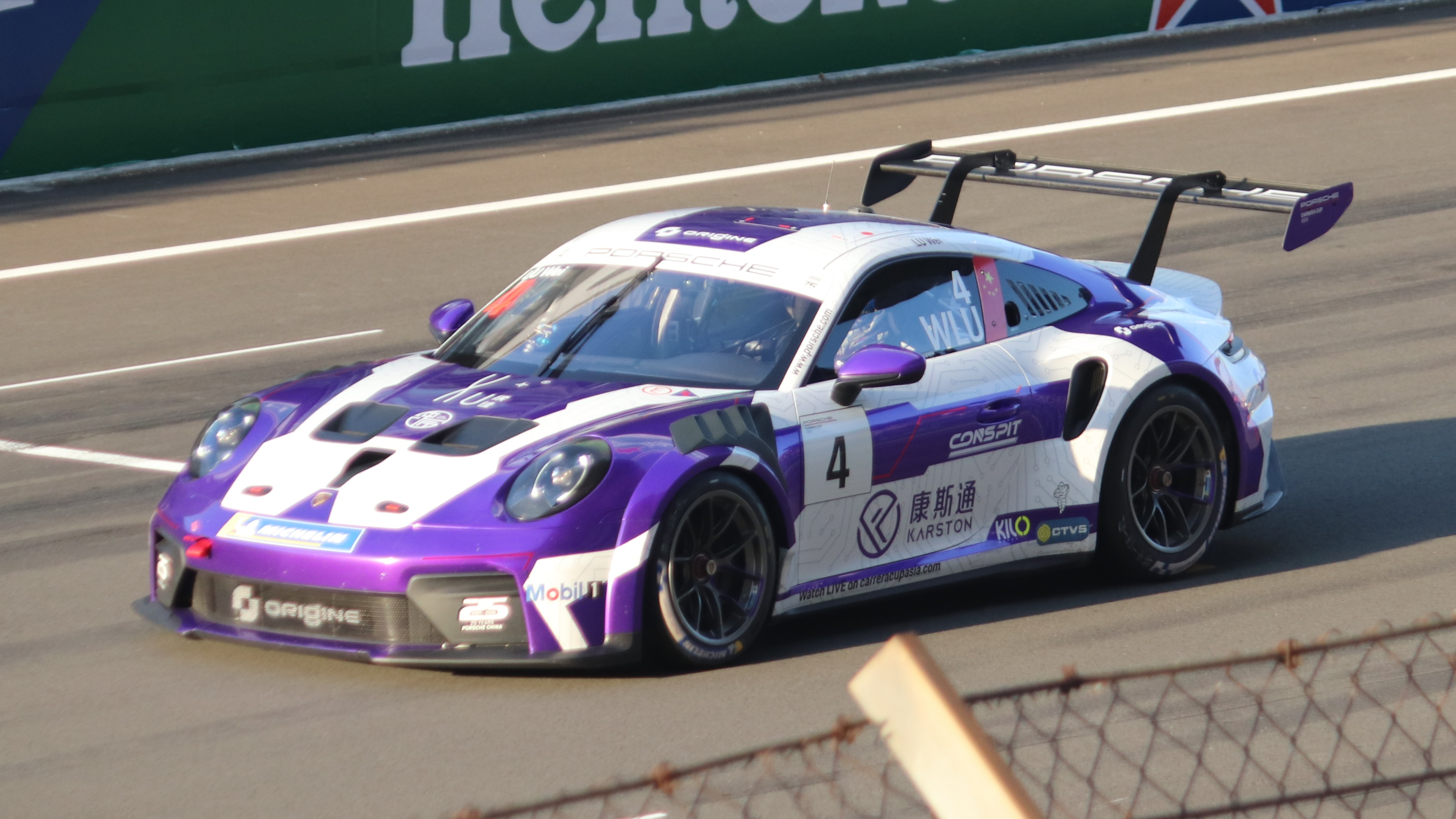
- Lu in 2026
- Nationality: (China) Chinese (Canada) Canadian
- Born: 6 November 1986 (age 40) Beijing, China
- Categorisation: FIA Bronze

Championship titles
- 2026 2025, 2026 2022: GT World Challenge Asia; GT World Challenge Asia – Pro-Am; Porsche Carrera Cup Asia – Pro-Am

Lü Wei (Chinese: 吕威; pinyin: Lǚ Wēi; born 6 November 1986), also known as Wei Lu, is a Chinese and Canadian racing driver who last competed in GT World Challenge Asia for Origine Motorsport.

== Career ==
Lü Wei was born in Beijing on 6 November 1986 and was raised there, before moving to Vancouver in 2006 and beginning to participate in club races shortly after, while owning a residential building construction company. After making his competitive racing debut in 2014 in Ferrari Challenge North America, Lü competed full-time in the series the following year, scoring five Trofeo Pirelli podiums en route to a fourth-place points finish. In parallel, Lü also raced in the TCB class of Pirelli World Challenge for Racing.ca, scoring a lone podium in Utah to take eighth in points.

Returning to the former for 2016, Lü scored a pair of second-place finishes at Lime Rock Park as he ended the year third in Trofeo Pirelli. At the end of the year, Lü finished second in the Ferrari Challenge Finali Mondiali. Continuing for an identical programme the following year, Lü took four wins and four further podiums en route to runner-up honours in Trofeo Pirelli. Remaining with Ferrari machinery for 2018 but stepping up to GT3 competition, Lü partnered up with Jeff Segal to compete in the SprintX GT Championship Series for TR3 Racing. Racing in GT Pro-Am, Lü won race one at Circuit of the Americas and both Utah races, as well as six other podiums as he missed out on the class title by four points.

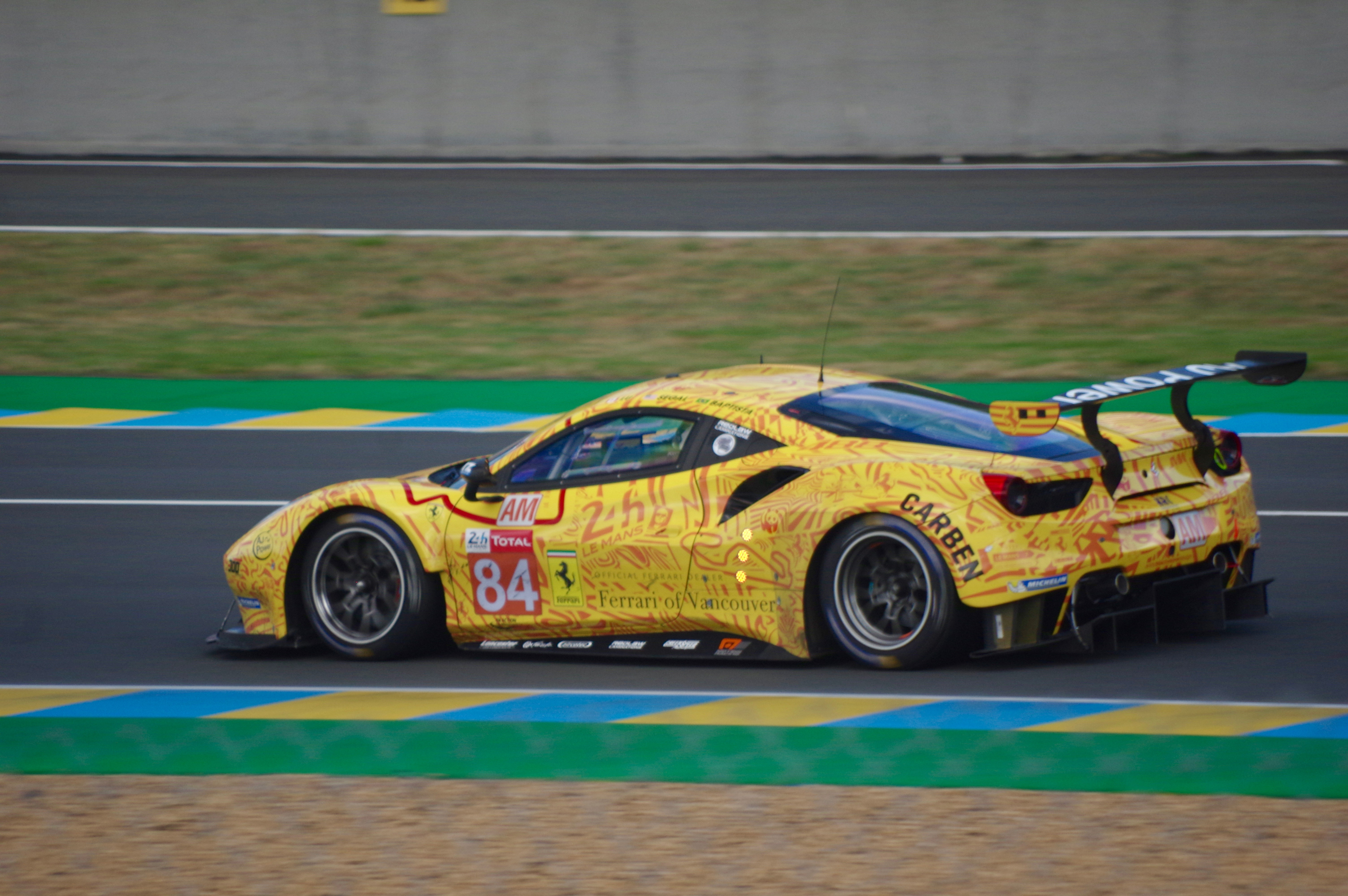
Lü made his 24 Hours of Le Mans debut in 2019 aboard a JMW Motorsport Ferrari.

In 2019, Lü joined Ferrari-linked JMW Motorsport to compete in the LMGTE class of the European Le Mans Series under the Canadian flag. Partnering Segal and Matteo Cressoni, Lü scored a pair of second-place finishes at Monza and Barcelona to take third in LMGTE. Lü also raced alongside Segal and Rodrigo Baptista at the 24 Hours of Le Mans in LMGTE Am, in which he crossed the line in third, before later being promoted to second after the race-winning Keating Motorsports Ford was disqualified post-race. During 2019, Lü also made one-off appearances in Blancpain GT World Challenge America for TR3 Racing, as well as Blancpain GT World Challenge Asia and China GT Championship for Phantom Pro Racing. The following year, Lü joined Shell Teamwork Lynk & Co Motorsport to race in the first two rounds of the TCR China Touring Car Championship, winning on his final start at Zhuzhou as he began using a Chinese licence. After racing part-time in the GT Super Sprint Challenge and China GT in 2021, Lü raced in Porsche Carrera Cup Asia the following year, in which he won the Pro-Am title for R&B Racing.

Continuing with Porsche-fielding R&B Racing to make his full-time debut in GT World Challenge Asia, Lü took overall wins at Motegi (with Dennis Olsen) and Sepang (with Patrick Pilet), as well as four other podiums to secure third in both the overall and GT3 Pro-Am standings. At the end of the year, Lü won the Shanghai 8 Hours with the same team alongside Yuan Bo and Leo Ye. After winning the 2024 Sepang 12 Hours with them, Lü stayed with the rebranded Origine Motorsport outfit to continue in GT World Challenge Asia for the rest of the year. In his second season in the series, Lü won at Sepang (with Laurin Heinrich) and Buriram (with Pilet) outright, as well as taking a class win at Suzuka en route to runner-up honours in Pro-Am. At the end of the year, Lü raced in the 2024–25 Asian Le Mans Series for Mercedes customer team Climax Racing in the GT class.

Lü then returned to Origine Motorsport for his third season in GT World Challenge Asia for the remainder of 2025, winning at Mandalika (with Alessio Picariello) and Okayama (with Bastian Buus) as he lost out on the overall title on countback, but was able to clinch the Pro-Am crown by one point. At the end of the year, Lü also raced with them in the first two rounds of the 2025–26 24H Series Middle East, winning the 2025 12 Hours of Malaysia and finishing on the GT3 Am podium at the 6 Hours of Abu Dhabi. For the rest of 2026, Lü remained with Origine Motorsport to race in both GT World Challenge Asia and Porsche Carrera Cup Asia. In GTWC Asia, Lü took overall wins at Sepang (with Picariello), Fuji and Shanghai (with Heinrich), as well as an additional class win to clinch his first overall title and his second consecutive Pro-Am crown.

== Racing record ==
=== Racing career summary ===
Season	Series	Team	Races	Wins	Poles	F/Laps	Podiums	Points	Position
2015	Pirelli World Challenge – TCB	Racing.ca	12	0	0	1	1	906	8th
2015	Ferrari Challenge North America – Trofeo Pirelli	Ferrari of Vancouver	8	0	1	1	5	101	4th
2015	Continental Tire Sports Car Challenge – ST	Mini JCW Team	1	0	0	0	0	10	70th
2016	Ferrari Challenge North America – Trofeo Pirelli	Ferrari of Vancouver	12	0	1	1	2	126	**3rd**
2016	Ferrari Challenge Finali Mondiali – Trofeo Pirelli	Ferrari of Vancouver	1	0	0	0	1	—N/a	**2nd**
2017	Ferrari Challenge North America – Trofeo Pirelli	Ferrari of Vancouver	14	5	7	5	9	213	**2nd**
2017	Ferrari Challenge Finali Mondiali – Trofeo Pirelli	Ferrari of Vancouver	1	0	0	0	0	—N/a	5th
2018	SprintX GT Championship Series – GT Pro-Am	TR3 Racing	10	3	0	0	9	230	**2nd**
2018	Ferrari Challenge Asia Pacific – Trofeo Pirelli		4	0	0	0	1	13	14th
2019	Blancpain GT World Challenge America	TR3 Racing	2	0	0	0	0	10	25th
2019	Blancpain GT World Challenge America – Pro-Am	TR3 Racing	2	1	0	0	1	27	11th
2019	European Le Mans Series – LMGTE	JMW Motorsport	6	0	0	0	2	74	**3rd**
2019	24 Hours of Le Mans – LMGTE Am	JMW Motorsport	1	0	0	0	1	—N/a	**2nd**
2019	China GT Championship – GT4	Phantom Pro Racing	3	2	0	0	3	76	13th
2019	Blancpain GT World Challenge Asia	Phantom Pro Racing	2	0	0	0	0	0	NC†
2019	Blancpain GT World Challenge Asia – Am	Phantom Pro Racing	2	2	2	0	2	0	NC†
2020	TCR China Touring Car Championship	Shell Teamwork Lynk & Co Motorsport	4	1	0	0	2	39	9th
2021	GT Super Sprint Challenge – Gentlemen								
2021	China GT Championship								
2022	Porsche Carrera Cup Asia	R&B Racing	8	0	0	0	2	72	7th
2023	GT World Challenge Asia – GT3	R&B Racing	12	2	0	0	6	133	**3rd**
2023	GT World Challenge Asia – GT3 Pro-Am	R&B Racing	12	2	0	0	6	135	**3rd**
2023	Lamborghini Super Trofeo Asia – Am	R&B Racing	2	0	0	0	1	11	10th
2023	Shanghai 8 Hours	R&B Racing	1	1	1	0	1	—N/a	**1st**
2024	GT World Challenge Asia	Origine Motorsport	12	2	2	0	4	127	**3rd**
2024	GT World Challenge Asia – Pro-Am	Origine Motorsport	12	3	5	0	5	161	**2nd**
2024	Porsche Carrera Cup Asia	R&B Racing	3	0	0	0	0	0	NC†
2024	Porsche Carrera Cup Asia – Pro-Am	R&B Racing	3	0	0	0	0	0	NC†
2024	Sepang 12 Hours	R&B Racing	1	1	0	0	1	—N/a	**1st**
2024	Lamborghini Super Trofeo Asia – Pro-Am	Madness Racing Team	2	1	0	0	3	0	NC†
2024–25	Asian Le Mans Series – GT	Climax Racing	4	0	0	0	0	1	24th
2025	Middle East Trophy – GT3 Am	Climax Racing	1	0	0	0	0	10	NC
2025	GT World Challenge Asia	Origine Motorsport	12	2	1	0	5	125	**2nd**
2025	GT World Challenge Asia – Pro-Am	Origine Motorsport	12	3	1	0	5	155	**1st**
2025	China GT Championship – GT3	Origine Motorsport	8	1	0	0	4	93	**3rd**
2025	China GT Championship – GT3 Pro-Am	Origine Motorsport	8	1	0	0	5	117	**3rd**
2025–26	24H Series Middle East – GT3 Am	Origine Motorsport	1	1	0	0	1	72	**3rd**
2025–26	24H Series Middle East – GT3 Am	Origine powered by CC	1	0	0	0	1	72	**3rd**
2026	Porsche Carrera Cup Asia	Origine Motorsport	5	0	0	0	0	19	20th
2026	Porsche Carrera Cup Asia – Pro-Am	Origine Motorsport	5	2	4	0	2	41.5	4th
2026	GT World Challenge Asia	Origine Motorsport	12	3	1	1	7	164	**1st**
2026	GT World Challenge Asia – Pro-Am	Origine Motorsport	12	4	2	0	9	207	**1st**
2026	Shanghai 8 Hours	Origine Motorsport	1	0	0	0	0	—N/a	9th
2026	China GT Championship – GT3	Team KRC							
2026	China GT Championship – GT3	Winhere Origine Motorsport							
2026	China GT Championship – GT3 Am	Team KRC							

^{†} As Lu was a guest driver, he was ineligible to score points.

=== Complete European Le Mans Series results ===
(key) (Races in bold indicate pole position; results in italics indicate fastest lap)

Year	Entrant	Class	Chassis	Engine	1	2	3	4	5	6	Rank	Points
2019	JMW Motorsport	LMGTE	Ferrari 488 GTE	Ferrari F154CB 3.9 L Turbo V8	LEC; 4	MNZ; 2					3rd	74
2019	JMW Motorsport	LMGTE	Ferrari 488 GTE Evo	Ferrari F154CB 3.9 L Turbo V8			CAT; 2	SIL; 6	SPA; 6	ALG; 5	3rd	74

=== Complete 24 Hours of Le Mans results ===
Year	Team	Co-Drivers	Car	Class	Laps	Pos.	Class Pos.
2019	(United Kingdom) JMW Motorsport	(United States) Jeff Segal (Brazil) Rodrigo Baptista	Ferrari 488 GTE	LMGTE Am	334	32nd	**2nd**

=== Complete GT World Challenge Asia results ===
(key) (Races in bold indicate pole position) (Races in italics indicate fastest lap)

Year	Team	Car	Class	1	2	3	4	5	6	7	8	9	10	11	12	DC	Points
2019	Phantom Pro Racing	Mercedes-AMG GT3	GT3 Am	SEP; 1	SEP; 2	CHA; 1	CHA; 2	SUZ; 1	SUZ; 2	FUJ; 1	FUJ; 2	KOR; 1	KOR; 2	**SHA**; **1**; 1	**SHA**; **2**; 1	NC†	0†
2023	R&B Racing	Porsche 911 GT3 R (992)	GT3 Pro-Am	BUR; 1; 4	BUR; 2; 15	FUJ; 1; 3	FUJ; 2; 3	SUZ; 1; 12	SUZ; 2; 3	MOT; 1 Ret	MOT; 2; 1	OKA; 1; 10	OKA; 2; 3	SEP; 1; 4	SEP; 2; 1	3rd	135
2024	Origine Motorsport	Porsche 911 GT3 R (992)	Pro-Am	**SEP**; **1**; 5	**SEP**; **2**; 1	BUR; 1; 5	BUR; 2; 1	FUJ; 1; 9	FUJ; 2; 5	**SUZ**; **1**; 1	SUZ; 2; 3	**OKA**; **1**; 3	**OKA**; **2**; 4	SHA; 1 Ret	SHA; 2; 4	2nd	161
2025	Origine Motorsport	Porsche 911 GT3 R (992.2)	Pro-Am	SEP; 1 Ret	SEP; 2; 6	MAN; 1; 12	MAN; 2; 1	BUR; 1; 1	BUR; 2; 5	FUJ; 1; 2	FUJ; 2; 9	OKA; 1; 2	**OKA**; **2**; 1	BEI; 1; 4	BEI; 2; 4	1st	155
2026	Origine Motorsport	Porsche 911 GT3 R (992.2)	Pro-Am	SEP; 1; 3	SEP; 2; 1	MAN; 1; 4	MAN; 2; 6	FUJ; 1; 2	FUJ; 2; 1	**OKA**; **1**; 2	OKA; 2; 2	BEI; 1 Ret	BEI; 2; 2	SHA; 1; 1	**SHA**; **2**; 1	1st	207

=== Complete Asian Le Mans Series results ===
(key) (Races in bold indicate pole position; results in italics indicate fastest lap)

Year	Entrant	Class	Chassis	Engine	1	2	3	4	5	6	Rank	Points
2024–25	Climax Racing	GT	Mercedes-AMG GT3 Evo	Mercedes-AMG M159 6.2 L V8	SEP; 1; 18	SEP; 2; 16	DUB; 1; 10	DUB; 2; 13	ABU; 1 WD	ABU; 2 WD	24th	1
