= Marco Giltrap =

New Zealand racing driver (born 2004)

- Giltrap in 2026
- Nationality: (New Zealand) New Zealander
- Born: 17 January 2004 (age 22) Auckland, New Zealand
- Relatives: Colin Giltrap (grandfather)
- Categorisation: FIA Silver

Championship titles
- 2026 2024–25 2024–25 2023 2023 2022–23 2022 2022: Porsche Carrera Cup Asia; Porsche Endurance Trophy New Zealand – Junior Pro; GT New Zealand Championship – Junior Pro; Lamborghini Super Trofeo Asia – Pro; Porsche Michelin Sprint Challenge Australia – Pro; GT New Zealand Championship – Open; NZ Endurance Championship – Class 2 NZ 1 Hour Endurance Championship

Marco Giltrap (born 17 January 2004) is a New Zealand racing driver who last competed in Porsche Carrera Cup Asia for Team Porsche New Zealand.

== Personal life ==
Giltrap is the grandson of Colin Giltrap, who founded of New Zealand automotive dealership Giltrap Group in 1966. His father Richard and uncle Michael are also stakeholders in the family-owned company.

== Career ==
Giltrap began karting at the age of 10, competing until 2021. Competing in New Zealand, Giltrap most notably won the 2019 NZ North Island Sprint Championship and the 2020 WPKA Goldstar Series titles, both in the Rotax Heavy class.

Towards the end of 2020, Giltrap made his car racing debut in the Toyota 86 Endurance Championship New Zealand alongside Simon Evans. The following year, Giltrap made his full-time debut in the 2020–21 Toyota 86 Championship New Zealand, finishing sixth in the overall standings as rookie of the year. Returning to the series for the following season, Giltrap scored a lone win at Taupo and finished third in the overall standings. Near the end of 2022, Giltrap also won the NZ 1 Hour Endurance Championship, as well as the Class 2 title, before claiming the 2022–23 GT New Zealand Championship in the Open class title at the start of 2023 in a Porsche 911.

Continuing in Porsche machinery for the rest of 2023, Giltrap joined Earl Bamber Motorsport-run Team Porsche New Zealand to enter Porsche Sprint Challenge Australia. After taking four wins between the Phillip Island and Symmons Plains rounds to take an early points lead, Giltrap then took six other podiums to clinch the Pro title at season's end. In parallel, Giltrap joined Absolute Racing to compete in the Pro class of Lamborghini Super Trofeo Asia with Chris van der Drift, as part of the Lamborghini Young Driver Programme, winning all but one of the 12 races to clinch the title with two rounds to spare at Inje.

After scoring a lone podium in Porsche Sprint Challenge Southern Europe for Team GP Elite at Algarve at the start of the following year, Giltrap returned to EBM to compete in his rookie season in Porsche Carrera Cup Australia. In his first season in the series, Giltrap took a best result of fourth at Sydney to end the year 13th in the Pro standings. During 2024, Giltrap also made select appearances in Porsche Carrera Cup Asia for Team Porsche New Zealand and in Lamborghini Super Trofeo Asia for Absolute Racing, most notably taking three wins in the latter alongside Clay Osborne. At the end of the year, Giltrap returned to New Zealand, where he secured the 2024–25 Porsche Endurance Trophy New Zealand and GT New Zealand Championship titles in the Junior Pro class for his family-owned team.

For the rest of 2025, Giltrap reunited with EBM for his second full season in Porsche Carrera Cup Australia. In the eight-round season, Giltrap scored a trio of podiums at Bathurst en route to tenth in the Pro standings. At the start of 2026, Giltrap competed for Team 75 Motorsport in Porsche Sprint Challenge Southern Europe, in which he took a lone win at Algarve to take fourth in the Sport class standings. For the rest of the year, Giltrap moved to Porsche Carrera Cup Asia with EBM–run Team Porsche New Zealand. In his first full season in the series, Giltrap began with three overall podiums in the first four rounds, before taking four wins between the Sepang and Singapore rounds to seal the overall title. In late 2026, Giltrap partook in the Porsche Junior Shootout at Algarve.

== Karting record ==
=== Karting career summary ===
Season	Series	Team	Position
2015	New Zealand Top Half Series – Mini ROK		
2015	Auckland Club Point Series – Mini ROK		7th
2016	NZ National Schools Championship – Vortex Mini Rok		17th
2016	Auckland Club Point Series – Mini Rok		3rd
2016	Auckland City of Sails – Mini Rok		12th
2016	Auckland Club Point Series – Junior Max		19th
2017	North Island Sprint Championship – Rotax Junior		17th
2017	New Zealand Top Half Series – Rotax Junior		
2017	RMC New Zealand – Junior Max		17th
2017	Auckland City of Sails – Rotax Junior		12th
2017	Auckland Club Point Series – Junior Max		6th
2017	Blossom Festival – Rotax Junior		17th
2018	Auckland Club Point Series – Junior Max		2nd
2018	Auckland City of Sails – Rotax Junior		9th
2018	Auckland Regional Schools Championship – Rotax Max Junior		9th
2018	National Schools Championship – Junior Max		24th
2019	NZ ProKart Series – Rotax Lights		2nd
2019	New Zealand National Sprint Championship – Rotax Light		17th
2019	New Zealand National Schools Championship – Rotax Light		7th
2019	NZ North Island Sprint Championship – Rotax Heavy		1st
2019	Auckland Club Point Series – Rotax Heavy		1st
2019	Auckland Regional Schools Championship – Rotax Light		4th
2019	Butch Pet Foods City of Sails – Rotax Light		8th
2020	WPKA Goldstar Series – Rotax Heavy		1st
2020	Auckland City of Sails – Rotax Heavy		3rd
2021	Auckland Club Point Series – Rotax Light		14th

== Racing record ==
=== Career summary ===
Season	Series	Team	Races	Wins	Poles	F/Laps	Podiums	Points	Position
2020	Toyota 86 Endurance Championship New Zealand		3	0	0	0	3		
2020–21	Toyota 86 Championship New Zealand		15	0	0	0	0	697	6th
2021	E30 Series New Zealand		16	0	0	0	0	1751	12th
2021–22	Toyota 86 Championship New Zealand		19	1	0	0	8	973	**3rd**
2022	Australian Production Cars		3	0	0	0	0		
2022	NZ 1 Hour Endurance Championship								**1st**
2022	NZ Endurance Championship – Class 2								**1st**
2022–23	GT New Zealand Championship – Open								**1st**
2023	Porsche Sprint Challenge Australia – Pro	Team Porsche New Zealand	18	4	1	0	10	803	**1st**
2023	Lamborghini Super Trofeo Asia – Pro	Absolute Racing	12	11	12	0	12	185	**1st**
2023	Lamborghini Super Trofeo World Finals – Pro	Absolute Racing	2	0	0	0	0	1	13th
2024	Porsche Sprint Challenge Southern Europe	Team GP Elite	8	0	0	0	1	59	8th
2024	Porsche Carrera Cup Australia – Pro	Earl Bamber Motorsport	24	0	0	0	0	411	13th
2024	Porsche Carrera Cup Asia	Team Porsche New Zealand	9	0	0	0	1	101	9th
2024	Lamborghini Super Trofeo Asia – Pro	Absolute Racing	4	3	3	2	3	56	6th
2024–25	GT New Zealand Championship – Junior Pro	Team Giltrap Group Motorsport	15	11	3	10	14		**1st**
2024–25	Porsche Endurance Trophy New Zealand – Junior Pro	Team Giltrap Group Motorsport							**1st**
2025	Porsche Carrera Cup Australia – Pro	EBM	21	0	0	0	3	509	10th
2025	Porsche Carrera Cup Asia	Team Porsche New Zealand	3	0	0	1	2	0	NC†
2026	Porsche Sprint Challenge Southern Europe – Sport	Team 75 Motorsport	6	1	0	0	3	83	4th
2026	Porsche Carrera Cup Asia	Team Porsche New Zealand	13	4	5	4	8	236.5	**1st**
2026	Porsche Carrera Cup Australia – Pro	EBM	3	0	0	0	1	117*	16th*

^{†} As Giltrap was a guest driver, he was ineligible to score points.

=== Complete Porsche Carrera Cup Asia results ===
(key) (Races in bold indicate pole position; races in italics indicate points for the fastest lap of top ten finishers)

Year	Entrant	Class	1	2	3	4	5	6	7	8	9	10	11	12	13	14	15	16	DC	Points
2024	Team Porsche New Zealand	Pro	SHA; 1	SHA; 2	SUZ; 1; 7	SUZ; 2; 6	CHA; 1	CHA; 2	BAN; 1; 5	BAN; 2; 6	SEP; 1; 2	SEP; 2; 5	SEP; 3 Ret	MRN; 1; 5	MRN; 2; 9	SHA; 1	SHA; 2	SHA; 3	9th	101
2025	Team Porsche New Zealand	Pro	SHA; 1	SHA; 2	MOT; 1	MOT; 2	SEP; 1; 2	SEP; 2; 2	SEP; 3; 5	BAN; 1	BAN; 2	MAN; 1	MAN; 2	MAN; 3	MRN; 1	MRN; 2			NC†	0†
2026	Team Porsche New Zealand	Pro	SHA; 1; 8	SHA; 2; 4	ZHU; 1; 2	ZHU; 2 Ret	FUJ; 1; 3	FUJ; 2; 5	BAN; 1; 4	BAN; 2; 2	**SEP**; **1**; 1	**SEP**; **2**; 3	**SEP**; **3**; 1	**MRN**; **1**; 1	**MRN**; **2**; 1				1st	236.5
