= 2023 Lamborghini Super Trofeo Asia =

International motor racing series

The 2023 Lamborghini Super Trofeo Asia was the tenth season of the Lamborghini Super Trofeo Asia. The season began on May 5 at Sepang International Circuit, and concluded on November 17 with the World Final at the Vallelunga Circuit. The season marked the series' return after a three year hiatus owing to the COVID-19 pandemic.

The Pro class championship was dominated by the New Zealand duo of Marco Giltrap and Chris van der Drift, capturing the title with two rounds to spare. Absolute Racing teammates Aniwat Lommahadthai and Pasarit Promsombat secured the Am class title. Other championship winners included Oscar Lee and Dan Wells in the Pro-Am division, and Supachai Weeraborwornpong in the Lamborghini Cup.

== Calendar ==
The 2023 schedule was unveiled in October the previous year.

Rnd.	Circuit	Date	Supporting
1	Sepang International Circuit, Selangor, Malaysia	5–7 May	Malaysian Championship Series
2	The Bend Motorsport Park, Tailem Bend, Australia	9–11 June	Stand-alone event
3	Fuji Speedway, Oyama, Japan	15–16 July	Super Formula Championship; Super Formula Lights
4	Inje Speedium, Inje County, South Korea	18–19 August	Stand-alone event
5	Shanghai International Circuit, Shanghai, China	8–10 September	TCR China Touring Car Championship
6	Vallelunga Circuit, Campagnano di Roma, Italy	14–15 November	Lamborghini Super Trofeo World Finals
WF	Vallelunga Circuit, Campagnano di Roma, Italy	16–17 November	Lamborghini Super Trofeo World Finals

== Teams and drivers ==
All teams used the Lamborghini Huracán Super Trofeo EVO2.

Team	No.	Drivers	Class	Rounds
(China) R&B Racing	4	(China) Wu Jiaxin	Am	5
(China) R&B Racing	4	(China) Lü Wei	Am	5
(Malaysia) HZO Fortis Racing Team	5	(Malaysia) Hairie Zairel Oh	LC	All
(Malaysia) HZO Fortis Racing Team	5	(Malaysia) Haziq Zairel Oh	LC	All
(Australia) Zagame Autosport	6	(Australia) Dean Canto	P	2
(Australia) Zagame Autosport	6	(Australia) Sam Brabham	P	2
(China) Vortex Orion Endurance	7	(China) Luo Haowen	PA	1, 3, 5–6
(China) Vortex Orion Endurance	7	(France) Benjamin Rouget	PA	1, 3, 5–6
(China) Vortex Orion Endurance	88	(Italy) Gabriele Murroni	LC	5
(China) TRT Racing	10	(China) Li Qiang	PA	1, 3–6
(China) TRT Racing	10	(Monaco) Jonathan Cecotto	P	All
(China) TRT Racing	18	(China) Zhilong Kang	Am	1–3, 5–6
(China) TRT Racing	18	(China) Lei Lu	Am	1–3, 5–6
(Australia) Objective Racing	11	(Australia) Tony Walls	PA	1–3, 5–6
(Australia) Objective Racing	11	(Australia) Jackson Walls	PA	1–3, 5–6
(China) Harmony Racing	16	(China) Xu Shenghui	P	All
(China) Harmony Racing	16	(Hong Kong) Chen Wei'an	P	1, 4–5
(China) Harmony Racing	16	(China) Liang Jiatong	P	2
(China) Harmony Racing	16	(Italy) Massimiliano Wiser	P	3, 6
(South Korea) Racegraph	17	(Singapore) Weiliang Ni	PA	1–2
(South Korea) Racegraph	17	(Finland) Mikko Petteri Nässi	PA	1–2
(South Korea) Racegraph	17	(Chinese Taipei) Gavin Huang	Am	3–4
(South Korea) Racegraph	17	(Chinese Taipei) David Ryo	Am	3–4
(South Korea) Racegraph	77	(Singapore) Weiliang Ni	PA	3–4
(South Korea) Racegraph	77	(Finland) Mikko Petteri Nässi	PA	3–4
(Hong Kong) Star Performance by Absolute Racing (Hong Kong) Absolute Racing	19	(Thailand) Aniwat Lommahadthai	Am	All
(Hong Kong) Star Performance by Absolute Racing (Hong Kong) Absolute Racing	19	(Thailand) Pasarit Promsombat	Am	All
(Hong Kong) Star Performance by Absolute Racing (Hong Kong) Absolute Racing	84	(New Zealand) Marco Giltrap	P	All
(Hong Kong) Star Performance by Absolute Racing (Hong Kong) Absolute Racing	84	(New Zealand) Chris van der Drift	P	All
(Japan) D1 Racing Team	21	(Chinese Taipei) Oscar Lee	PA	1–2
(Japan) D1 Racing Team	21	(Hong Kong) Dan Wells	PA	1–2
(Japan) D1 Racing Team	28	(Hong Kong) Ka Hing Tse	Am	1–2, 5
(Japan) D1 Racing Team	28	(Hong Kong) David Lau	PA	2, 5
(Japan) D1 Racing Team	93	(Australia) Adrian Deitz	Am	2
(Hong Kong) DW Evans GT	21	(Hong Kong) Oscar Lee	PA	3–6
(Hong Kong) DW Evans GT	21	(Hong Kong) Dan Wells	PA	3–6
(Italy) Iron Lynx	33	(Indonesia) Jason Loh	Am	All
(Italy) Iron Lynx	33	(Malaysia) Mark Darwin Partap Singh	Am	All
(Italy) Iron Lynx	37	(Malaysia) Kumar Prabakaran	LC	All
(Chinese Taipei) BC Racing	51	(Chinese Taipei) Johnson Huang	Am	All
(Chinese Taipei) BC Racing	51	(Chinese Taipei) Vincent Tai	Am	All
(South Korea) SQDA-GRIT Motorsport	63	(South Korea) Changwoo Lee	Am	All
(South Korea) SQDA-GRIT Motorsport	63	(South Korea) John Kwon	Am	All
(Thailand) Siamgas Corse	71	(Thailand) Supachai Weeraborwornpong	LC	All
True Visions Motorsports Thailand	78	(Thailand) Suttiluck Buncharoen	Am	1–3
(Hong Kong) Kamlung Racing Team	83	(Hong Kong) Keith Wong	LC	1
(Hong Kong) Kamlung Racing Team	83	(Macau) Keng Fai Vong	LC	2–3
(Hong Kong) Kamlung Racing Team	83	(Hong Kong) Chin Min Ma	LC	All
(Hong Kong) Triple Ace Racing	91	(Hong Kong) Henry Kwong	Am	All
(Hong Kong) Triple Ace Racing	91	(Hong Kong) Eric Kwong	Am	All
(Japan) Promotion Racing	99	(Japan) Jun Tashiro		3
(Japan) Promotion Racing	99	(Japan) Shunsuke Kohno		3

Icon	Class
P	Pro Cup
PA	Pro-Am Cup
Am	Am Cup
LC	Lamborghini Cup
	Guest Starter

== Race results ==
Bold indicates the overall winner.

Round		Circuit	Pole position	Pro winners	Pro-Am winners	Am winners	LC Winners
1	R1	(Malaysia) Sepang	(Japan) No. 21 D1 Grand Prix	**(Hong Kong) No. 84 Absolute Racing**	(Japan) No. 21 D1 Grand Prix	(South Korea) No. 63 SQDA-GRIT Motorsport	(Thailand) No. 71 Siamgas Corse
1	R1	(Malaysia) Sepang	(Chinese Taipei) Oscar Lee (Hong Kong) Dan Wells	**(New Zealand) Marco Giltrap** **(New Zealand) Chris van der Drift**	(Chinese Taipei) Oscar Lee (Hong Kong) Dan Wells	(South Korea) Changwoo Lee (South Korea) John Kwon	(Thailand) Supachai Weeraborwornpong
1	R2	(Malaysia) Sepang	(China) No. 16 Harmony Racing	(Hong Kong) No. 84 Absolute Racing	**(Japan) No. 21 D1 Grand Prix**	(Japan) No. 28 D1 Grand Prix	(Italy) No. 37 Iron Lynx
1	R2	(Malaysia) Sepang	(China) Xu Shenghui (Hong Kong) Chen Wei'an	(New Zealand) Marco Giltrap (New Zealand) Chris van der Drift	**(Chinese Taipei) Oscar Lee** **(Hong Kong) Dan Wells**	(Hong Kong) Ka Hing Tse	(Malaysia) Kumar Prabakaran
2	R1	(Australia) The Bend	(China) No. 10 TRT Racing	(Hong Kong) No. 84 Absolute Racing	(Japan) No. 21 D1 Grand Prix	(South Korea) No. 63 SQDA-GRIT Motorsport	(Thailand) No. 71 Siamgas Corse
2	R1	(Australia) The Bend	(Monaco) Jonathan Cecotto	(New Zealand) Marco Giltrap (New Zealand) Chris van der Drift	(Chinese Taipei) Oscar Lee (Hong Kong) Dan Wells	(South Korea) Changwoo Lee (South Korea) John Kwon	(Thailand) Supachai Weeraborwornpong
2	R2	(Australia) The Bend	(China) No. 10 TRT Racing	(China) No. 10 TRT Racing	(Japan) No. 21 D1 Grand Prix	(Hong Kong) No. 19 Absolute Racing	(Italy) No. 37 Iron Lynx
2	R2	(Australia) The Bend	(Monaco) Jonathan Cecotto	(Monaco) Jonathan Cecotto	(Chinese Taipei) Oscar Lee (Hong Kong) Dan Wells	(Thailand) Aniwat Lommahadthai (Thailand) Pasarit Promsombat	(Malaysia) Kumar Prabakaran
3	R1	(Japan) Fuji	(Hong Kong) No. 84 Absolute Racing	(Hong Kong) No. 84 Absolute Racing	(Australia) No. 11 Objective Racing	(South Korea) No. 63 SQDA-GRIT Motorsport	(Italy) No. 37 Iron Lynx
3	R1	(Japan) Fuji	(New Zealand) Marco Giltrap (New Zealand) Chris van der Drift	(New Zealand) Marco Giltrap (New Zealand) Chris van der Drift	(Australia) Tony Walls (Australia) Jackson Walls	(South Korea) Changwoo Lee (South Korea) John Kwon	(Malaysia) Kumar Prabakaran
3	R2	(Japan) Fuji	(China) No. 16 Harmony Racing	(Hong Kong) No. 84 Absolute Racing	(Hong Kong) No. 21 DW Evans GT	(Hong Kong) No. 91 Triple Ace Racing	(Hong Kong) No. 83 Kamlung Racing Team
3	R2	(Japan) Fuji	(China) Xu Shenghui (Hong Kong) Chen Wei'an	(New Zealand) Marco Giltrap (New Zealand) Chris van der Drift	(Chinese Taipei) Oscar Lee (Hong Kong) Dan Wells	(Hong Kong) Henry Kwong (Hong Kong) Eric Kwong	(Hong Kong) Chi Min Ma (Macau) Keng Fai Vong
4	R1	(South Korea) Inje	(Hong Kong) No. 21 DW Evans GT	(Hong Kong) No. 84 Absolute Racing	(South Korea) No. 77 Racegraph	(South Korea) No. 63 SQDA-GRIT Motorsport	(Thailand) No. 71 Siamgas Corse
4	R1	(South Korea) Inje	(Chinese Taipei) Oscar Lee (Hong Kong) Dan Wells	(New Zealand) Marco Giltrap (New Zealand) Chris van der Drift	(Singapore) Weiliang Ni (Finland) Mikko Petteri Nässi	(South Korea) Changwoo Lee (South Korea) John Kwon	(Thailand) Supachai Weeraborwornpong
4	R2	(South Korea) Inje	(China) No. 10 TRT Racing	(Hong Kong) No. 84 Absolute Racing	(Hong Kong) No. 21 DW Evans GT	(Hong Kong) No. 19 Absolute Racing	(Thailand) No. 71 Siamgas Corse
4	R2	(South Korea) Inje	(China) Qiang Li (Monaco) Jonathan Cecotto	(New Zealand) Marco Giltrap (New Zealand) Chris van der Drift	(Chinese Taipei) Oscar Lee (Hong Kong) Dan Wells	(Thailand) Aniwat Lommahadthai (Thailand) Pasarit Promsombat	(Thailand) Supachai Weeraborwornpong
5	R1	(China) Shanghai	(Hong Kong) No. 84 Absolute Racing	(Hong Kong) No. 84 Absolute Racing	(China) No. 10 TRT Racing	(Hong Kong) No. 19 Absolute Racing	(Malaysia) No. 5 HZO Fortis Racing Team
5	R1	(China) Shanghai	(New Zealand) Marco Giltrap (New Zealand) Chris van der Drift	(New Zealand) Marco Giltrap (New Zealand) Chris van der Drift	(China) Qiang Li (Monaco) Jonathan Cecotto	(Thailand) Aniwat Lommahadthai (Thailand) Pasarit Promsombat	(Malaysia) Hairie Zairel Oh (Malaysia) Haziq Zairel Oh
5	R2	(China) Shanghai	(Hong Kong) No. 84 Absolute Racing	(Hong Kong) No. 84 Absolute Racing	(Hong Kong) No. 21 DW Evans GT	(Hong Kong) No. 19 Absolute Racing	(Thailand) No. 71 Siamgas Corse
5	R2	(China) Shanghai	(New Zealand) Marco Giltrap (New Zealand) Chris van der Drift	(New Zealand) Marco Giltrap (New Zealand) Chris van der Drift	(Chinese Taipei) Oscar Lee (Hong Kong) Dan Wells	(Thailand) Aniwat Lommahadthai (Thailand) Pasarit Promsombat	(Thailand) Supachai Weeraborwornpong
6	R1	(Italy) Vallelunga	(Hong Kong) No. 84 Absolute Racing	**(Hong Kong) No. 84 Absolute Racing**	(China) No. 10 TRT Racing	(Hong Kong) No. 19 Absolute Racing	(Malaysia) No. 5 HZO Fortis Racing Team
6	R1	(Italy) Vallelunga	(New Zealand) Marco Giltrap (New Zealand) Chris van der Drift	**(New Zealand) Marco Giltrap** **(New Zealand) Chris van der Drift**	(China) Qiang Li (Monaco) Jonathan Cecotto	(Thailand) Aniwat Lommahadthai (Thailand) Pasarit Promsombat	(Malaysia) Hairie Zairel Oh (Malaysia) Haziq Zairel Oh
6	R2	(Italy) Vallelunga	(Hong Kong) No. 84 Absolute Racing	**(Hong Kong) No. 84 Absolute Racing**	(Hong Kong) No. 21 DW Evans GT	(South Korea) No. 63 SQDA-GRIT Motorsport	(Thailand) No. 71 Siamgas Corse
6	R2	(Italy) Vallelunga	(New Zealand) Marco Giltrap (New Zealand) Chris van der Drift	**(New Zealand) Marco Giltrap** **(New Zealand) Chris van der Drift**	(Chinese Taipei) Oscar Lee (Hong Kong) Dan Wells	(South Korea) Changwoo Lee (South Korea) John Kwon	(Thailand) Supachai Weeraborwornpong

== Championship standings ==
=== Scoring system ===
Position	1st	2nd	3rd	4th	5th	6th	7th	8th	9th	10th	Pole
Points	15	12	10	8	6	5	4	3	2	1	1

=== Pro ===
Pos.	Driver	Team	(Malaysia) SEP		(Australia) BEN		(Japan) FUJ		(South Korea) INJ		(China) SHA		(Italy) VAL		Pts
Pos.	Driver	Team	R1	R2	R1	R2	R1	R2	R1	R2	R1	R2	R1	R2	Pts
1	(New Zealand) Marco Giltrap (New Zealand) Chris van der Drift	(Hong Kong) Absolute Racing	1	1	1	2	1	1	1	1	1	1	1	1	185
2	(China) Xu Shenghui	(China) Harmony Racing	Ret	2	3	4	2	2			2	2	2	Ret	91
3	(Hong Kong) Chen Wei'an	(China) Harmony Racing		2					2	2	2	2			61
4	(China) Liang Jiatong	(China) Harmony Racing			3	4			2	2					42
5	(Italy) Massimiliano Wiser	(China) Harmony Racing					2	2					2	Ret	37
6	(Monaco) Jonathan Cecotto	(China) TRT Racing			4	1									25
7	(Australia) Dean Canto (Australia) Sam Brabham	(Australia) Zagame Autosport			2	3									22
Pos.	Driver	Team	R1	R2	R1	R2	R1	R2	R1	R2	R1	R2	R1	R2	Pts
Pos.	Driver	Team	(Malaysia) SEP		(Australia) BEN		(Japan) FUJ		(South Korea) INJ		(China) SHA		(Italy) VAL		Pts

=== Pro-Am ===
Pos.	Driver	Team	(Malaysia) SEP		(Australia) BEN		(Japan) FUJ		(South Korea) INJ		(China) SHA		(Italy) VAL		Pts
Pos.	Driver	Team	R1	R2	R1	R2	R1	R2	R1	R2	R1	R2	R1	R2	Pts
1	(Chinese Taipei) Oscar Lee (Hong Kong) Dan Wells	(Japan) D1 Racing Team (Hong Kong) DW Evans GT	1	1	1	1	3	1	Ret	1	2	1	2	1	160
2	(Australia) Tony Walls (Australia) Jackson Walls	(Australia) Objective Racing	2	2	3	2	1	3					3	3	106
3	(China) Qiang Li (Monaco) Jonathan Cecotto	(China) TRT Racing	DSQ	5			4	2	2	3	1	3	1	2	103
4	(Singapore) Weiliang Ni (Finland) Mikko Petteri Nässi	(South Korea) Racegraph	3	3	2	3	2	4	1	2					89
5	(China) Haowen Luo (France) Benjamin Rouget	(China) Vortex Orion Endurance	4	4			5	5			4	4	4	4	60
6	(Hong Kong) David Lau (Hong Kong) Ka Hing Tse	(Japan) D1 Racing Team									3	5			16
Pos.	Driver	Team	R1	R2	R1	R2	R1	R2	R1	R2	R1	R2	R1	R2	Pts
Pos.	Driver	Team	(Malaysia) SEP		(Australia) BEN		(Japan) FUJ		(South Korea) INJ		(China) SHA		(Italy) VAL		Pts

=== Am ===
Pos.	Driver	Team	(Malaysia) SEP		(Australia) BEN		(Japan) FUJ		(South Korea) INJ		(China) SHA		(Italy) VAL		Pts
Pos.	Driver	Team	R1	R2	R1	R2	R1	R2	R1	R2	R1	R2	R1	R2	Pts
1	(Thailand) Aniwat Lommahadthai (Thailand) Pasarit Promsombat	(Hong Kong) Absolute Racing	2	4	2	1	3	7	2	1	1	1	1	2	152
2	(South Korea) Changwoo Lee (South Korea) John Kwon	(South Korea) SQDA-GRIT Motorsport	1	Ret	1	3	1	2	1	2	2	2	4	1	143
3	(Hong Kong) Henry Kwong (Hong Kong) Eric Kwong	(Hong Kong) Triple Ace Racing	8	5	3	2	5	1	5	4	5	6	3	4	95
4	(Indonesia) Jason Loh (Malaysia) Mark Darwin Partap Singh	(Italy) Iron Lynx	3	7	6	4	2	4	3	3	Ret	4	2	Ret	89
5	(Chinese Taipei) Johnson Huang (Chinese Taipei) Vincent Tai	(Chinese Taipei) BC Racing	4	3	5	8	7	6	4	6	4	7	5	3	71
6	(Thailand) Suttiluck Buncharoen	True Visions Motorsports Thailand	6	2	4	6	6	3							45
7	(China) Zhilong Kang (China) Lei Lu	(China) TRT Racing	5	6	Ret	5	Ret	DNS			3	5	Ret	5	39
8	(Chinese Taipei) Gavin Huang (Chinese Taipei) David Ryo	(South Korea) Racegraph					4	5	6	5					25
9	(Hong Kong) Ka Hing Tse	(Japan) D1 Racing Team	7	1	Ret	DNS									19
10	(China) Lü Wei (China) Wu Jiaxin	(China) R&B Racing									Ret	3			11
11	(Australia) Adrian Deitz	(Japan) D1 Racing Team			7	7									8
12	(Hong Kong) David Lau	(Japan) D1 Racing Team			Ret	DNS									0
Pos.	Driver	Team	R1	R2	R1	R2	R1	R2	R1	R2	R1	R2	R1	R2	Pts
Pos.	Driver	Team	(Malaysia) SEP		(Australia) BEN		(Japan) FUJ		(South Korea) INJ		(China) SHA		(Italy) VAL		Pts

=== LC Cup ===
Pos.	Driver	Team	(Malaysia) SEP		(Australia) BEN		(Japan) FUJ		(South Korea) INJ		(China) SHA		(Italy) VAL		Pts
Pos.	Driver	Team	R1	R2	R1	R2	R1	R2	R1	R2	R1	R2	R1	R2	Pts
1	(Thailand) Supachai Weeraborwornpong	(Thailand) Siamgas Corse	1	3	1	Ret	3	2	1	1	4	1	2	1	120
2	(Malaysia) Kumar Prabakaran	(Italy) Iron Lynx	2	1	2	1	1	4	Ret	3	5	2	Ret	4	108
3	(Hong Kong) Chi Min Ma	(Hong Kong) Kamlung Racing Team	4	2	Ret	2	2	1	3	4	2	4	3	3	98
4	(Malaysia) Hairie Zairel Oh (Malaysia) Haziq Zairel Oh	(Malaysia) HZO Fortis Racing Team	3	Ret	3	3	Ret	3	2	2	1	3	1	2	90
5	(Macau) Keng Fai Vong	(Hong Kong) Kamlung Racing Team	4	2	Ret	2	2	1							60
6	(Italy) Gabriele Murroni	(China) Vortex Orion Endurance									3	5			16
Pos.	Driver	Team	R1	R2	R1	R2	R1	R2	R1	R2	R1	R2	R1	R2	Pts
Pos.	Driver	Team	(Malaysia) SEP		(Australia) BEN		(Japan) FUJ		(South Korea) INJ		(China) SHA		(Italy) VAL		Pts
