= BWT (company) =

Austrian company

- Type: Aktiengesellschaft
- ISIN: AT0000737705
- Industry: Water treatment
- Founded: 1823 as Benckiser Wassertechnik
- Founder: Johann Adam Benckiser
- Headquarters: Mondsee (Vöcklabruck District), Upper Austria, Austria
- Key people: Andreas Weißenbacher (CEO); Gerhard Speigner (CFO)
- Products: Equipment and systems for water treatment
- Revenue: €610.04 million (2016)
- Number of employees: 3,300 (2017)
- Website: bwt.com

BWT, registered name BWT AG, is an Austrian manufacturing company of water treatment systems with its headquarters in Mondsee.

== Production sites and subsidiaries ==
The company has four main production sites at Mondsee (Austria), Schriesheim (Germany), Paris (France), and Aesch (Switzerland), as well as numerous subsidiaries and affiliated companies, and a global distribution network.

As of April 2026 the company acquired Eden Springs UK to be merged with BWT UK, increasing their presence within the UK market.

== History ==
BWT was founded as Benckiser Wassertechnik in 1823 by Johann Adam Benckiser in Germany. Following several acquisitions and mergers, the company was purchased in 1990 by Andreas Weißenbacher in a management buyout. The company was floated on the Vienna Stock Exchange in 1992.

The WAB Group is the principal shareholder of BWT, with around 20% of shares owned by diverse shareholders and roughly 6% owned by the company (as of February 2014).

== Products ==
BWT provides innovative products, water treatment systems and services for:

- filtering and desalination of drinking water, pharmaceutical and process water (pure water, ultrapure water, water for injection, et cetera), and swimming pool water. The pharmaceutical water division, BWT Pharma & Biotech, is headquartered in Germany near Stuttgart.
- Fuel cell and battery membranes
- Heating, boiling, and cooling water
- Ion exchange systems for demineralisation (including water softening)
- Metering technology
- Electrolysis, electrodialysis, and electrodeionisation
- Water dispensing solutions for businesses
- Coffee machine solutions for workplaces

== Awards and prizes ==
The company's filter cartridge for table water received the National Award for Innovation for Upper Austria in 2011. The same year, the Rondomat Duo S series of water softeners won the Austrian national design prize in the Capital Goods category awarded by the Federal Ministry of the Economy Family and Youth (German: Bundesministerium für Wirtschaft, Familie und Jugend).

BWT’s products for private households have been winners of the Plus X Award on two occasions. In 2012, the AQA perla water softening system was voted "Best Product of the Year 2013", and the E1 Single Lever filter received the same accolade in 2013.

In 2014, the "black penguin" BWT table water filter won the Red Dot Design Award.

== Sponsorship ==
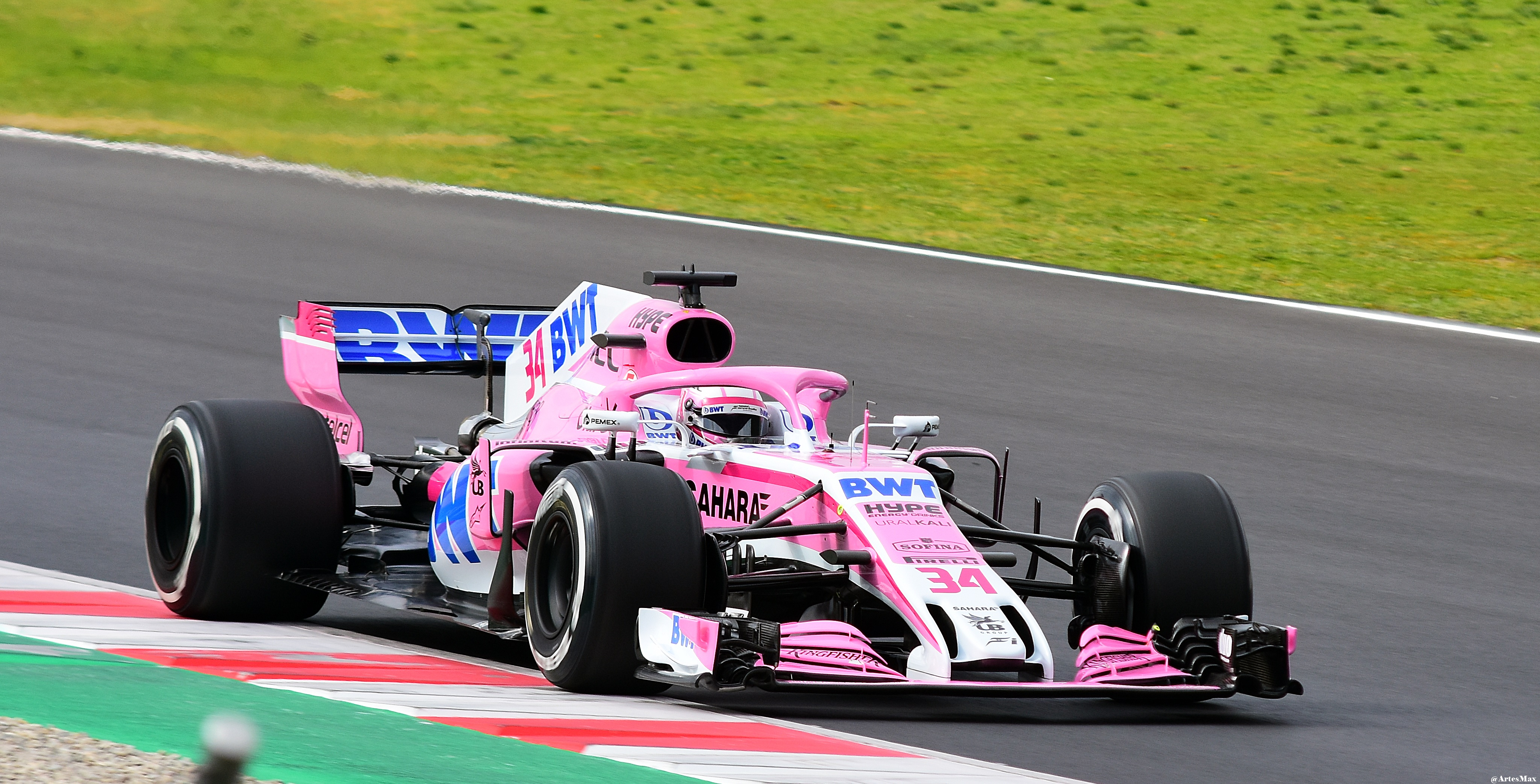
Force India car sponsored by BWT

BWT has a wide range of sponsorship deals with various motorsport teams, such as Mücke Motorsport in DTM, Forze Hydrogen Electric Racing (a student racing team from the Delft University of Technology making hydrogen-powered race cars), ADAC GT Masters, Formula 4, and Walter Lechner Racing in the high-profile Porsche Carrera Cup Germany and Porsche Supercup.

Most notably, in Formula One, the company was the title sponsor of the Racing Point F1 Team (previously Racing Point Force India and Force India Formula One) from 2017 through 2020 as the BWT Racing Point F1 Team, up until its rebranding as the Aston Martin F1 Team for the 2021 season. The F1 sponsorship was continued with the new Aston Martin team for 2021, with BWT assuming the role of a "Global Partner". In 2021, Aston Martin Cognizant Formula One Team driver Sebastian Vettel signed on to become a BWT Ambassador.

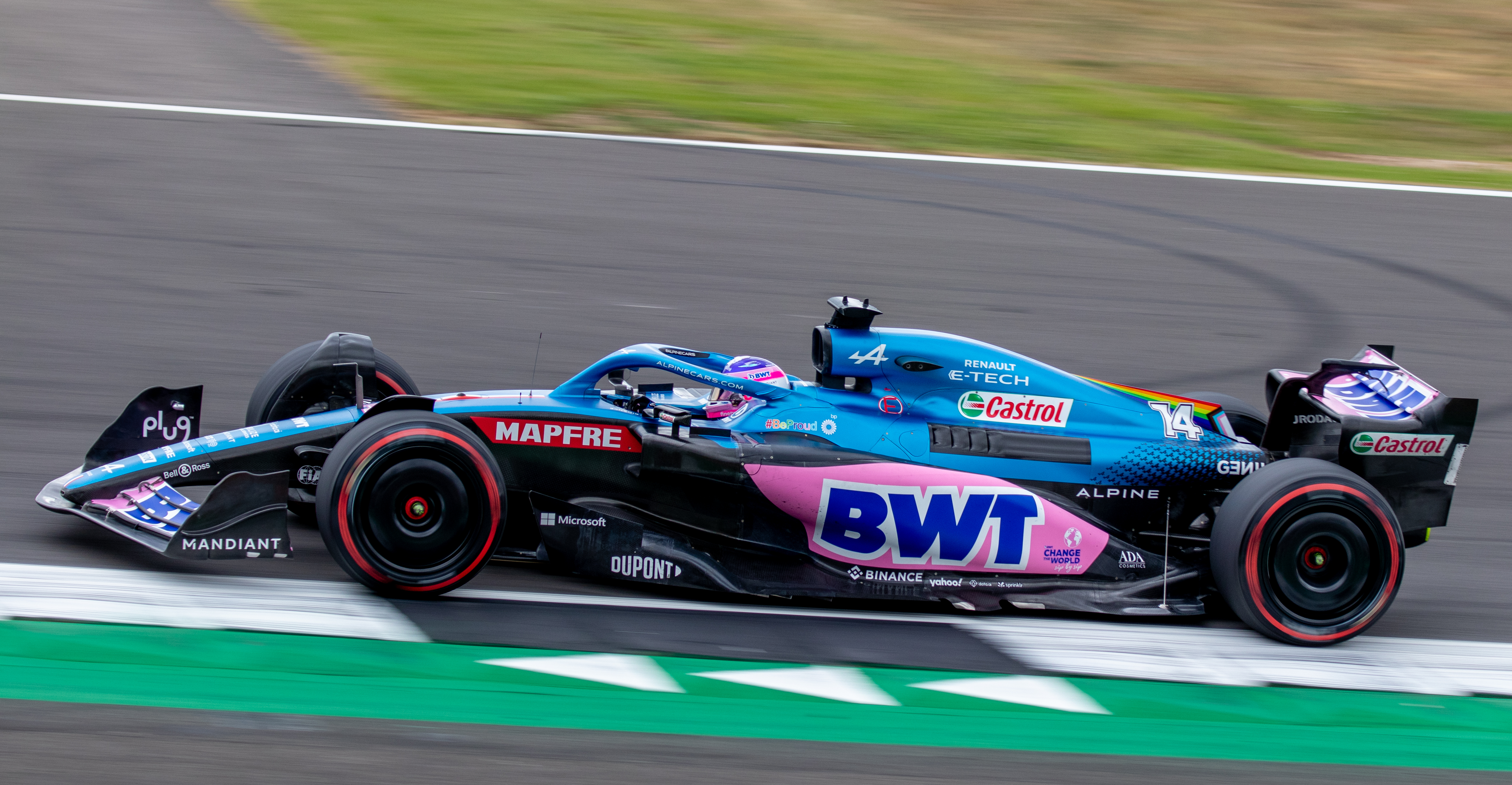
BWT-sponsored Alpine A522 at the 2022 British Grand Prix

In 2021, BWT announced that they joined the ranks of the Salzburg Festival's main sponsors. The sponsorship deal became effective at the start of the festival's 2021 season and is set to expire in 2026.

In 2022, Alpine F1 Team signed a title sponsorship contract with BWT, with the team renamed as the BWT Alpine F1 Team. In 2023, BWT's deal with Alpine was extended to the Alpine Academy's young driver lineup.
