= 2014 GT Asia Series =

Fifth season of the GT Asia Series championship

Seasons
- ← 2013 2015 →

The 2014 GT Asia Series season was the fifth season of the GT Asia Series championship. It began on 17 May at the Korea International Circuit and ended on 16 November at the Guia Circuit after thirteen races.

== Race calendar and results ==
Round	Circuit	Date	Pole position	GT3 Winner	GTM Winner
1	(South Korea) Korea International Circuit	17 May	#5 NB Team	#37 Spirit of Race	#34 Dilango Racing
1	(South Korea) Korea International Circuit	17 May	(Italy) Andrea Caldarelli (China) Fu Song Yang	(China) Anthony Liu (Italy) Davide Rizzo	(Japan) Takuma Aoki
2	(South Korea) Korea International Circuit	18 May	#37 Spirit of Race	#37 Spirit of Race	#34 Dilango Racing
2	(South Korea) Korea International Circuit	18 May	(China) Anthony Liu (Italy) Davide Rizzo	(China) Anthony Liu (Italy) Davide Rizzo	(Japan) Takuma Aoki (Sri Lanka) Dilantha Malagamuwa
3	(Japan) Autopolis	31 May	#97 Craft-Bamboo Racing	#3 Clearwater Racing	#21 Francis Tjia
3	(Japan) Autopolis	31 May	(United Kingdom) Richard Lyons (Hong Kong) Frank Yu	(Singapore) Weng Sun Mok (Japan) Keita Sawa	(Hong Kong) Francis Tjia
4	(Japan) Autopolis	1 June	#37 Spirit of Race	#32 Clearwater Racing	#21 Francis Tjia
4	(Japan) Autopolis	1 June	(China) Anthony Liu (Italy) Davide Rizzo	(United Kingdom) Rob Bell (Japan) Hiroshi Hamaguchi	(Hong Kong) Francis Tjia
5	(Japan) Fuji Speedway	12 July	#3 Clearwater Racing	#3 Clearwater Racing	#16 Wayne Shen
5	(Japan) Fuji Speedway	12 July	(Singapore) Weng Sun Mok (Japan) Keita Sawa	(Singapore) Weng Sun Mok (Japan) Keita Sawa	(Canada) Wayne Shen
6	(Japan) Fuji Speedway	13 July	#32 Clearwater Racing	#7 Absolute Racing	#47 D'Station HAI Racing
6	(Japan) Fuji Speedway	13 July	(United Kingdom) Rob Bell (Japan) Hiroshi Hamaguchi	(Chinese Taipei) Jeffrey Lee (Germany) Christopher Mies	(Japan) Satoshi Hoshino
7	(Malaysia) Sepang International Circuit	16 August	#98 Absolute Racing	#97 Craft-Bamboo Racing	#88 Taiwan Top Speed Racing Team
7	(Malaysia) Sepang International Circuit	16 August	(Malaysia) Alex Yoong (Hong Kong) Philip Ma	(Germany) Stefan Mücke (Hong Kong) Frank Yu	(Chinese Taipei) George Chou (Denmark) Thomas Fjordbach
8	(Malaysia) Sepang International Circuit	17 August	#11 AAS Motorsport Team	#3 Clearwater Racing	#34 Dilango Racing
8	(Malaysia) Sepang International Circuit	17 August	(Thailand) Piti Bhirombhakdi (Thailand) Vutthikorn Inthraphuvasak	(Singapore) Weng Sun Mok (Japan) Keita Sawa	(Japan) Takuma Aoki (Japan) Ken Urata
9	(Malaysia) Sepang International Circuit	13 September	#12 Clearwater Racing	#3 Clearwater Racing	#77 Tiger Racing Team
9	(Malaysia) Sepang International Circuit	13 September	(Italy) Alessandro Pier Guidi (Singapore) Richard Wee	(Singapore) Weng Sun Mok (Japan) Keita Sawa	(Hong Kong) Marchy Lee (Hong Kong) Jacky Yeung
10	(Malaysia) Sepang International Circuit	14 September	#37 BBT	#12 Clearwater Racing	#16 Wayne Shen
10	(Malaysia) Sepang International Circuit	14 September	(China) Anthony Liu (Italy) Davide Rizzo	(Italy) Alessandro Pier Guidi (Singapore) Richard Wee	(Canada) Wayne Shen
11	(China) Shanghai International Circuit	11 October	#37 BBT	#37 BBT	#77 Tiger Racing Team
11	(China) Shanghai International Circuit	11 October	(China) Anthony Liu (Italy) Davide Rizzo	(China) Anthony Liu (Italy) Davide Rizzo	(Hong Kong) Matthew Solomon (Hong Kong) Jacky Yeung
12	(China) Shanghai International Circuit	12 October	#37 Spirit of Race	#9 NB Team	#77 Tiger Racing Team
12	(China) Shanghai International Circuit	12 October	(China) Anthony Liu (Italy) Davide Rizzo	(Italy) Max Wiser (China) Jiang Xin	(Hong Kong) Matthew Solomon (Hong Kong) Jacky Yeung
13	(Macau) Guia Circuit	16 November	#1 Audi Race Experience	#5 Mercedes AMG Driving Academy	#21 Francis Tjia
13	(Macau) Guia Circuit	16 November	(Italy) Edoardo Mortara	(Germany) Maro Engel	(Hong Kong) Francis Tjia

== Championships ==
Points were awarded as follows:

Position	1st	2nd	3rd	4th	5th	6th	7th	8th	9th	10th	11th	12th
Points	18	16	14	10	9	8	7	6	5	4	2	1

=== Drivers Championship ===
Only the best 11 results count for the drivers championship

=== Teams Championship ===
Pos	Team	Points
1	Clearwater Racing	340
2	Craft-Bamboo AMR	189
3	Absolute Racing	164
4	Spirit of Race	121
4	NB Team	121
6	BBT	109
7	Dilango Racing	74
8	Tiger Racing Team	36
9	B-Max Racing Team	35
10	Taiwan Top Speed Racing Team	27
11	Singha AAS Motorsport Team	19
12	Direction Racing	17
13	Mike Racing	9
14	Team KRM	4
15	LKM Racing	2
16	IMS	0
16	Team Lotus	0
