= 2011 Porsche Carrera Cup Asia =

Motorsport racing season

The 2011 Porsche Carrera Cup Asia was the ninth season of the Porsche Carrera Cup Asia. The season commenced on March 21 at the Shanghai International Circuit and finished at the same circuit on November 8. This season saw the largest number of entries with a bumper field of 26 drivers for the first round in Shanghai.

The season was largely dominated by Swiss driver Alexandre Imperatori, who won eight out of the twelve races. However, after having to miss the fifth round in Singapore, it allowed Keita Sawa and Rodolfo Ávila to usurp him in the points standings. In a closely-fought final round in Shanghai, Sawa took the championship by one point over Ávila. The B Class championship was won by Wang Jian Wei who finished a very credible fifth place overall.

== Calendar ==
The following venues hosted at least one round of the 2011 championship.

Round	Circuit	Date	Supporting
1	Shanghai International Circuit, Shanghai, China	15–17 April	Chinese Grand Prix
2	Zhuhai International Circuit, Zhuhai, China	28–29 May	Asian Formula Renault Challenge; China Touring Car Championship
3	Ordos International Circuit, Ordos City, China	9–10 July	China Touring Car Championship
4	Sepang International Circuit, Selangor, Malaysia	27–28 August	Malaysia Touring Car Championship
5	Marina Bay Street Circuit, Marina Bay, Singapore	23–25 September	Singapore Grand Prix
6	Shanghai International Circuit, Shanghai, China	22–23 October	Asian Formula Renault Challenge; GT Asia Series

== Teams and drivers ==
All entrants utilized the Porsche 997.2 GT3 Cup cars.

Team	No.	Driver	Class	Rounds
(Singapore) SC Global Racing	2	(New Zealand) Craig Baird		5
(Hong Kong) Absolute Racing (Chinese Taipei) Team Pauian Archiland by Absolute Racing	3	(Hong Kong) Alain Li	B	2–3, 5
(Hong Kong) Absolute Racing (Chinese Taipei) Team Pauian Archiland by Absolute Racing	7	(Chinese Taipei) Jeffrey Lee	B	All
(Hong Kong) Absolute Racing (Chinese Taipei) Team Pauian Archiland by Absolute Racing	63	(France) Henri Richard		1, 4, 6
(Hong Kong) Absolute Racing (Chinese Taipei) Team Pauian Archiland by Absolute Racing	89	(United States) Brian Wong		1–5
(New Zealand) McElrea Racing	5	(Singapore) Yuey Tan	B	All
(China) Team Betterlife	9	(China) Wang Jian Wei	B	All
(China) Team Betterlife	37	(Italy) Davide Rizzo	B	2–4, 6
(China) Team Betterlife	37	(China) Anthony Liu	B	1
(Singapore) Team Kangshun	11	(Singapore) Ringo Chong	B	All
(China) Asia Racing Team	15	(Macau) Keith Vong	B	All
(China) Asia Racing Team	83	(Hong Kong) Ma Chi Min	B	All
(Hong Kong) Modena Motorsport	16	(Hong Kong) Wayne Shen	B	All
(Hong Kong) Modena Motorsport	28	(Hong Kong) John Shen	B	1–5
(Hong Kong) OpenRoad Racing	18	(Netherlands) Marcel Tjia	B	All
(Hong Kong) OpenRoad Racing	21	(Netherlands) Francis Tjia	B	All
(Hong Kong) OpenRoad Racing	25	(Canada) Christian Chia	B	2
(Hong Kong) Team Jebsen	20	(Macau) Rodolfo Ávila		All
(Hong Kong) Team Daycraft	22	(Hong Kong) Morris Ku	B	All
(Australia) Paul Tresidder Racing	23	(Australia) Paul Tresidder	B	1–4, 6
(Malaysia) Nexus Racing	27	(Malaysia) Adrian Henry D'Silva	B	All
(Singapore) Team PCS Racing	33	(Singapore) Weng Mok Sun		1, 4
Team Hong Kong Racing	36	(Chinese Taipei) Steven Chian	B	1, 3
Team Hong Kong Racing	98	(Hong Kong) Philip Ma	B	2, 4–6
(Hong Kong) LKM Racing Team	55	(Hong Kong) Darryl O'Young		1–5
(Hong Kong) LKM Racing Team	55	(United Kingdom) Tim Sugden		6
(Hong Kong) LKM Racing Team	88	(Japan) Keita Sawa		All
(China) Shift2neutral Racing	59	(Canada) Philip Briandet	B	1–5
(China) Shift2neutral Racing	59	(Hong Kong) Daniel Andrew Bilski		6
(China) Team C&D	66	(China) Rose Tan Ying	B	All
(Hong Kong) OMAK	68	(Hong Kong) Mak Hing Tak	B	All
(Hong Kong) Jacky Yeung Racing	77	(Hong Kong) Jacky Yeung	B	All
(Singapore) Team StarChase	99	(Switzerland) Alexandre Imperatori		1–4, 6
(Singapore) Team StarChase	99	(Germany) Christian Menzel		5

Icon	Class
B	B Class
	Guest Starter

== Results ==
Round		Circuit	Pole Position	Overall Winner	B-Class Pole Position	B-Class Winner
1	R1	(China) Shanghai 1	(Japan) Keita Sawa	(Switzerland) Alexandre Imperatori	(Singapore) Ringo Chong	(Singapore) Ringo Chong
1	R2	(China) Shanghai 1		(Switzerland) Alexandre Imperatori		(China) Wang Jian-Wei
2	R1	(China) Zhuhai	(Hong Kong) Darryl O'Young	(Switzerland) Alexandre Imperatori	(Italy) Davide Rizzo	(China) Wang Jian-Wei
2	R2	(China) Zhuhai		(Switzerland) Alexandre Imperatori		(China) Wang Jian-Wei
3	R1	(China) Ordos	(Hong Kong) Darryl O'Young	(Japan) Keita Sawa	(Italy) Davide Rizzo	(Italy) Davide Rizzo
3	R2	(China) Ordos		(Macau) Rodolfo Ávila		(Italy) Davide Rizzo
4	R1	(Malaysia) Sepang	(Switzerland) Alexandre Imperatori	(Switzerland) Alexandre Imperatori	(Italy) Davide Rizzo	(Italy) Davide Rizzo
4	R2	(Malaysia) Sepang		(Switzerland) Alexandre Imperatori		(Italy) Davide Rizzo
5	R1	Singapore	(Germany) Christian Menzel	(Germany) Christian Menzel	(Singapore) Ringo Chong	(Chinese Taipei) Jeffrey Lee
5	R2	Singapore		(Germany) Christian Menzel		(Chinese Taipei) Jeffrey Lee
6	R1	(China) Shanghai 2	(Switzerland) Alexandre Imperatori	(Switzerland) Alexandre Imperatori	(Italy) Davide Rizzo	(Italy) Davide Rizzo
6	R2	(China) Shanghai 2		(Switzerland) Alexandre Imperatori		(China) Wang Jian-Wei

== Championship standings ==
=== Scoring system ===
Points were awarded to the top fifteen classified drivers in every race, using the following system:

Position	1st	2nd	3rd	4th	5th	6th	7th	8th	9th	10th	11th	12th	13th	14th	15th	Pole
Points	20	18	16	14	12	10	9	8	7	6	5	4	3	2	1	1

=== Overall ===
Pos.	Driver	SHA1 (China)		ZHU (China)		ORD (China)		SEP (Malaysia)		SIN (Singapore)		SHA2 (China)		Points
Pos.	Driver	R1	R2	R1	R2	R1	R2	R1	R2	R1	R2	R1	R2	Points
1	(Japan) Keita Sawa	2	16	2	2	1	4	2	2	3	3	2	3	199
2	(Macau) Rodolfo Ávila	3	2	3	3	2	1	4	4	5	5	3	2	198
3	(Switzerland) Alexandre Imperatori	1	1	1	1	9	3	1	1			1	1	185
4	(Hong Kong) Darryl O'Young	4	14	Ret	4	5	2	3	3	4	4			130
5	(China) Wang Jian-Wei	9	4	4	5	6	7	8	7	11	9	6	5	121
6	(Singapore) Ringo Chong	6	Ret	6	8	7	9	9	8	7	10	7	6	98
7	(Netherlands) Francis Tjia	12	5	5	7	10	10	DNS	9	8	8	5	7	97
8	(United States) Brian Wong	8	3	7	6	3	5	7	7	DNS	DNS			95
9	(Hong Kong) Wayne Shen	10	6	12	11	8	8	10	10	Ret	Ret	8	8	69
10	(Italy) Davide Rizzo			Ret	Ret	4	6	6	6			4	Ret	58
11	(Chinese Taipei) Jeffrey Lee	11	Ret	8	Ret	23	12	7	Ret	6	6	Ret	Ret	54
12	(Hong Kong) Philip Ma			Ret	14			11	11	9	7	10	12	42
13	(Singapore) Yuey Tan	Ret	Ret	10	9	Ret	18	12		Ret	11	11	9	36
14	(Hong Kong) Alain Li			9	10	13	Ret			12	12			28
15	(Hong Kong) John Shen	13	7	Ret	13	11	14	13	14	Ret				27
16	(China) Rose Tan Ying	16	Ret	11	12	17	19	Ret		15	15	13	10	24
17	(Canada) Philip Briandet	Ret	Ret	13	Ret	12	11	14		14	13			23
18	(France) Henri Richard	DNS	DNS					15				9	4	22
19	(Singapore) Weng Mok Sun	5	Ret						Ret	9				21
20	(Australia) Paul Tresidder	15	8	Ret		18	Ret		12			14	11	20
21	(Macau) Keith Vong	14	17			15	Ret		13	13		12	Ret	15
22	(Hong Kong) Mak Hing Tak	19	12		Ret	14	Ret		Ret		14		12	10
23	(China) Anthony Liu	7	Ret											9
24	(Netherlands) Marcel Tjia	Ret	DNS			19	16			16	14		13	9
25	(Hong Kong) Morris Ku	18	7			Ret	17		15		17		Ret	8
26	(Malaysia) Adrian Henry D'Silva	21	13	Ret	Ret	16	13			15			15	8
27	(Chinese Taipei) Steven Chian	Ret	9			20	Ret							7
28	(Hong Kong) Ma Chi Min	17	11	Ret		22	15			Ret		15	Ret	7
29	(Canada) Christian Chia			14	15									3
30	(Hong Kong) Jacky Yeung	20	15	15		21	20							2
Guest driver ineligible for points
-	(Germany) Christian Menzel									1	1			0
-	(New Zealand) Craig Baird									2	2			0
-	(United Kingdom) Tim Sugden											3	4	0
Pos.	Driver	R1	R2	R1	R2	R1	R2	R1	R2	R1	R2	R1	R2	Points
Pos.	Driver	SHA1 (China)		ZHU (China)		ORD (China)		SEP (Malaysia)		SIN (Singapore)		SHA2 (China)		Points

=== Class B ===
Pos.	Driver	SHA1 (China)		ZHU (China)		ORD (China)		SEP (Malaysia)		SIN (Singapore)		SHA2 (China)		Points
Pos.	Driver	R1	R2	R1	R2	R1	R2	R1	R2	R1	R2	R1	R2	Points
1	(China) Wang Jian-Wei	3	1	1	1	2	2	3	2	4	3	3	1	212
2	(Singapore) Ringo Chong	1	Ret	3	3	3	4	4	3	2	4	4	2	178
3	(Netherlands) Francis Tjia	6	2	2	2	5	5	DNS	4	3	2	2	3	170
4	(Hong Kong) Wayne Shen	4	3	8	6	4	3	5	5	Ret	Ret	5	4	128
5	(Italy) Davide Rizzo			Ret	Ret	1	1	1	1			1	Ret	104
6	(Chinese Taipei) Jeffrey Lee	5	Ret	4	Ret	Ret	7	2	Ret	1	1	Ret	Ret	93
7	(Singapore) Yuey Tan	Ret	Ret	6	4	Ret	13	6	12	Ret	5	6	5	75
8	(China) Rose Tan Ying	10	Ret	7	7	12	14	Ret	11	8	9	8	6	68
9	(Hong Kong) John Shen	7	4	Ret	8	6	9	7	8	Ret	14			67
10	(Australia) Paul Tresidder	9	5	Ret	11	13	Ret	12	6			9	7	57
11	(Canada) Philip Briandet	Ret	Ret	9	Ret	7	6	8	13	7	7			55
12	(Hong Kong) Alain Li			5	5	8	Ret			5	6			54
13	(Hong Kong) Morris Ku	12	7	12	10	Ret	12	10	9	11	11	12	Ret	54
14	(Macau) Keith Vong	8	12	14	15	10	Ret	12	7	6	16	7	Ret	51
15	(Hong Kong) Mak Hing Tak	13	9	13	Ret	9	Ret	9	Ret	12	10	11	9	49
16	(Hong Kong) Ma Chi Min	11	8	Ret	12	17	10	11	10	Ret	12	10	Ret	44
17	(Netherlands) Marcel Tjia	Ret	DNS	15	13	14	11	13	16	9	8	13	8	40
18	(Malaysia) Adrian Henry D'Silva	15	10	Ret	Ret	11	8	15	15	10	15	15	10	36
19	(Hong Kong) Jacky Yeung	14	11	11	14	16	15	16	14	13	13	14	11	30
20	(China) Anthony Liu	2	Ret											18
21	(Canada) Christian Chia			10	9									13
22	(Chinese Taipei) Steven Chian	Ret	6			15	Ret							11
Pos.	Driver	R1	R2	R1	R2	R1	R2	R1	R2	R1	R2	R1	R2	Points
Pos.	Driver	SHA1 (China)		ZHU (China)		ORD (China)		SEP (Malaysia)		SIN (Singapore)		SHA2 (China)		Points

== See also ==
- 2011 Porsche Supercup
- 2011 Porsche Carrera Cup Germany
- 2011 Porsche Carrera Cup Great Britain
- 2011 Australian Carrera Cup Championship
- 2011 Porsche Carrera Cup Italia
