= 2012 Porsche Carrera Cup Asia =

Motorsport racing season

The 2012 Porsche Carrera Cup Asia was the tenth season of the Porsche Carrera Cup Asia. The season commenced on April 13 at the Shanghai International Circuit and finished at the same circuit on November 11.

Swiss driver Alexandre Imperatori largely dominated the championship and took the title with a round to spare. The B-Class championship was won by Hong Kong driver Wayne Shen.

== Calendar ==
The following venues hosted at least one round of the 2012 championship.

Round	Circuit	Date	Supporting
1	Shanghai International Circuit, Shanghai, China	13–15 April	Chinese Grand Prix
2	Zhuhai International Circuit, Zhuhai, China	2–3 June	China Touring Car Championship; Audi R8 LMS Cup; Volkswagen Scirocco R-Cup China
3	Ordos International Circuit, Ordos City, China	7–8 July	China Touring Car Championship; Formula Pilota China; Volkswagen Scirocco R-Cup China
4	Sepang International Circuit, Selangor, Malaysia	31 August–2 September	Malaysia Merdeka Endurance Race; Ferrari Challenge Asia Pacific; Volkswagen Scirocco R-Cup China
5	Marina Bay Street Circuit, Marina Bay, Singapore	21–23 September	Singapore Grand Prix; GP2 Series; Ferrari Challenge Asia Pacific
6	Shanghai International Circuit, Shanghai, China	10–11 November	Lamborghini Super Trofeo Asia; Audi R8 LMS Cup; Volkswagen Scirocco R-Cup China

== Teams and drivers ==
Team	No.	Driver	Class	Rounds
(Hong Kong) LKM Racing Team	1	(Japan) Keita Sawa		All
(China) Team Carrera Cup Asia	3	(Denmark) Allan Simonsen		1, 3
(China) Team Carrera Cup Asia	3	(United Kingdom) Matthew Marsh		2
(China) Team Carrera Cup Asia	3	(Australia) David Brabham		6
(Malaysia) Sime Darby Auto Performance	3	(Malaysia) Azman Yahya	B	4
(Singapore) SC Global Racing	3	(New Zealand) Craig Baird		5
(New Zealand) McElrea Racing	5	(Singapore) Yuey Tan	B	All
(China) BBT	6	(China) Zheng Ting	B	1–4, 6
(China) BBT	6	(Italy) Massimiliano Wiser		5
(China) BBT	37	(China) Anthony Liu	B	1
(China) BBT	37	(Italy) Davide Rizzo		2–6
(China) Team Yongda Dongfan	8	(France) Benjamin Rouget		All
(China) Team BetterLife	9	(China) Wang Jianwei		1–4, 6
(Macau) Asia Racing Team	9	(France) Philippe Descombes		5
(Macau) Asia Racing Team	81	(China) Huang Chu Han	B	All
(Macau) Asia Racing Team	95	(Chinese Taipei) Kevin Chen		4
(Macau) Asia Racing Team	96	(China) Li Chao	B	All
(Singapore) Team Kangshun	11	(Singapore) Ringo Chong		1–3, 5–6
(Hong Kong) Modena Motorsport	16	(Hong Kong) Wayne Shen	B	All
(Hong Kong) Modena Motorsport	28	(Hong Kong) John Shen	B	All
(Hong Kong) OpenRoad Racing (Hong Kong) OpenRoad Racing by ART Motorsport	18	(Hong Kong) Marcel Tjia	B	1–3, 5–6
(Hong Kong) OpenRoad Racing (Hong Kong) OpenRoad Racing by ART Motorsport	21	(Hong Kong) Francis Tjia	B	All
(Hong Kong) OpenRoad Racing (Hong Kong) OpenRoad Racing by ART Motorsport	25	(Canada) Christian Chia	B	All
(Hong Kong) Team Jebsen	20	(Macau) Rodolfo Ávila		All
(Singapore) Hewlett Motorsport	23	(Australia) Paul Tresidder	B	All
(Malaysia) Nexus Racing	27	(Malaysia) Adrian Henry D'Silva	B	All
(China) PS Racing	31	(France) Patrice Bonzom	B	1
(China) PS Racing	31	(United States) Peter Olson	B	2
(China) PS Racing	31	(Finland) Pekka Saarinen		3
(China) PS Racing	31	(Hong Kong) Eric Lo	B	4
(China) PS Racing	31	(Hong Kong) Shim Ching	B	5
(China) PS Racing	31	(Hong Kong) Thong Wei Fung	B	6
(China) PS Racing	55	(China) Ren Wei	B	1
(China) PS Racing	55	(China) Sean He	B	2
(China) PS Racing	55	(Australia) Marc Cini	B	4–5
(China) PS Racing	55	(Italy) Angelo Negro	B	6
(China) PS Racing	87	(China) Sun Zheng		3
(China) Team C&D	66	(China) Rose Tan	B	All
(Hong Kong) OMAK	68	(Hong Kong) Mak Hing Tak	B	1–2, 4–6
(Hong Kong) OMAK	68	(Hong Kong) Adderly Fong		3
(China) Team Basetex	78	(China) Zhang Dasheng		All
(Hong Kong) Dr. Ma Chi Min	83	(Hong Kong) Ma Chi Min	B	All
(China) Team Eagle - Jiejun & Junbaojie	86	(Austria) Martin Ragginger		All
(Singapore) Seminole Racing Team	88	(Norway) Egidio Perfetti	B	All
(Singapore) Team StarChase	98	(China) Ho-Pin Tung		All
(Singapore) Team StarChase	99	(Switzerland) Alexandre Imperatori		All

Icon	Class
B	B Class
	Guest Starter

== Results ==
Round		Circuit	Pole Position	Overall Winner	B-Class Pole Position	B-Class Winner
1	R1	(China) Shanghai 1	(Switzerland) Alexandre Imperatori	(Switzerland) Alexandre Imperatori	(China) Anthony Liu	(China) Anthony Liu
1	R2	(China) Shanghai 1		(Switzerland) Alexandre Imperatori		(Norway) Egidio Perfetti
2	R1	(China) Zhuhai	(Switzerland) Alexandre Imperatori	(Switzerland) Alexandre Imperatori	(China) Huang Chu Han	(Norway) Egidio Perfetti
2	R2	(China) Zhuhai		(Switzerland) Alexandre Imperatori		(Norway) Egidio Perfetti
3	R1	(China) Ordos	(Austria) Martin Ragginger	(Austria) Martin Ragginger	(China) Huang Chu Han	(Singapore) Yuey Tan
3	R2	(China) Ordos		(Denmark) Allan Simonsen		(Hong Kong) Wayne Shen
4	R1	(Malaysia) Sepang	(Switzerland) Alexandre Imperatori	(Switzerland) Alexandre Imperatori	(Hong Kong) Francis Tjia	(Hong Kong) Wayne Shen
4	R2	(Malaysia) Sepang		(Switzerland) Alexandre Imperatori		(China) Huang Chu Han
5		Singapore	(Austria) Martin Ragginger	(New Zealand) Craig Baird	(Hong Kong) Francis Tjia	(Norway) Egidio Perfetti
6	R1	(China) Shanghai 2	(Macau) Rodolfo Ávila	(Austria) Martin Ragginger	(China) Li Chao	(Norway) Egidio Perfetti
6	R2	(China) Shanghai 2		(Switzerland) Alexandre Imperatori		(China) Huang Chu Han

== Championship standings ==
=== Scoring system ===
Points were awarded to the top fifteen classified drivers in every race, using the following system:

Position	1st	2nd	3rd	4th	5th	6th	7th	8th	9th	10th	11th	12th	13th	14th	15th	Pole
Points	20	18	16	14	12	10	9	8	7	6	5	4	3	2	1	1

=== Overall ===
Pos.	Driver	SHA1 (China)		ZHU (China)		ORD (China)		SEP (Malaysia)		SIN (Singapore)	SHA2 (China)		Points
Pos.	Driver	R1	R2	R3	R4	R5	R6	R7	R8	R9	R10	R11	Points
1	(Switzerland) Alexandre Imperatori	1	1	1	1	2	11	1	1	3	4	1	199
2	(Japan) Keita Sawa	3	2	6	2	3	10	5	3	6	5	2	155
3	(Macau) Rodolfo Ávila	4	Ret	2	3	11	14	4	2	4	2	5	137
4	(Austria) Martin Ragginger	2	15	Ret	4	1	9	2	9	2	1	12	133
5	(China) Ho-Pin Tung	7	3	Ret	9	4	5	3	5	5	3	6	130
6	(France) Benjamin Rouget	5	5	3	6	Ret	7	7	4	7	6	Ret	103
7	(Italy) Davide Rizzo			7	5	6	2	Ret	7	8	8	Ret	77
8	(China) Zhang Dasheng	13	8	Ret	13	9	4	Ret	8	12	7	3	77
9	(China) Wang Jianwei	11	7	4	Ret	8	3	6	Ret		9	Ret	71
10	(Norway) Egidio Perfetti	8	4	5	7		13	Ret	Ret	11	10	Ret	61
11	(Singapore) Ringo Chong	9	9	8	8	10	6			16	15	9	60
12	(Hong Kong) Wayne Shen	10	11	9	10	15	12	8	10	15	14	11	56
13	(Hong Kong) Francis Tjia	12	Ret	Ret	12	13	15	9	11	13	11	8	45
14	(China) Huang Chu Han		10	Ret	11	14	19	10	6	20	12	7	43
15	(Singapore) Yuey Tan	14	Ret	Ret		12	16	13	Ret	14	13	10	25
16	(Finland) Pekka Saarinen					5	8						21
17	(China) Zheng Ting		13	10		Ret	18	12	12			13	21
18	(China) Anthony Liu	6	6										20
19	(Malaysia) Adrian Henry D'Silva			14			23	11	Ret	21		16	10
20	(Hong Kong) Adderly Fong					7	Ret						9
21	(Canada) Christian Chia		12	Ret			24		15	17		17	9
22	(Hong Kong) John Shen	Ret		11	15		17	15		Ret		Ret	7
23	(China) Li Chao			Ret	14		20	14	14	Ret		Ret	6
24	(Australia) Paul Tresidder	15		13			22	Ret	Ret	23		18	5
25	(Hong Kong) Mak Hing Tak			12				Ret	Ret	24		20	4
26	(Australia) Marc Cini								13	22			3
27	(France) Patrice Bonzom		14										2
28	(Hong Kong) Ma Chi Min			Ret			26			18		Ret	1
29	(China) Sean He			15									1
-	(China) Rose Tan	Ret		Ret			21			Ret		Ret	0
-	(Hong Kong) Marcel Tjia			DNS		Ret	25			19		19	0
-	(United States) Peter Olson				Ret								0
-	(Hong Kong) Eric Lo							Ret	DNS				0
-	(China) Ren Wei	DNS	Ret										0
-	(China) Sun Zheng						DNS						0
-	(Chinese Taipei) Kevin Chen												0
Guest drivers ineligible for points
-	(Denmark) Allan Simonsen						1						0
-	(New Zealand) Craig Baird									1			0
-	(Australia) David Brabham											4	0
-	(Italy) Massimiliano Wiser									9			0
-	(France) Philippe Descombes									10			0
-	(Italy) Angelo Negro											14	0
-	(Hong Kong) Thong Wei Fung											15	0
-	(Hong Kong) Shim Ching									Ret			0
Pos.	Driver	R1	R2	R3	R4	R5	R6	R7	R8	R9	R10	R11	Points
Pos.	Driver	SHA1 (China)		ZHU (China)		ORD (China)		SEP (Malaysia)		SIN (Singapore)	SHA2 (China)		Points

== See also ==
- 2012 Porsche Supercup
- 2012 Porsche Carrera Cup Germany
- 2012 Porsche Carrera Cup Great Britain
