= 2023 GT World Challenge Asia =

Motor racing competition season

The 2023 Fanatec GT World Challenge Asia Powered by AWS was the fifth season of the GT World Challenge Asia, an auto racing series for grand tourer cars in Asia co-promoted by the SRO Motorsports Group and Team Asia One GT Management. The races were contested with GT3-spec and GT4-spec cars. The season began on 13 May at the Chang International Circuit in Thailand and ended on 24 September at Sepang in Malaysia.

== Calendar ==
| Round | Circuit | Date |
|---|---|---|
| 1 | Chang International Circuit, Buriram, Thailand | 13–14 May |
| 2 | (Japan) Fuji Speedway, Oyama, Shizuoka | 17–18 June |
| 3 | (Japan) Suzuka International Racing Course, Suzuka, Mie | 15–16 July |
| 4 | (Japan) Mobility Resort Motegi, Motegi, Tochigi | 22–23 July |
| 5 | (Japan) Okayama International Circuit, Mimasaka, Okayama | 19–20 August |
| 6 | (Malaysia) Sepang International Circuit, Sepang District, Selangor | 23–24 September |

== Entry list ==
| Team | Car | Engine | No. | Drivers | Class | Rounds |
GT3
| (Japan) Car Guy Racing | Ferrari 296 GT3 2 Ferrari 488 GT3 Evo 2020 4 | Ferrari F163CE 3.0 L Turbo V6 2 Ferrari F154CB 3.9 L Turbo V8 4 | 1 | (Japan) Kei Cozzolino | PA | 2, 4–5 |
| (Japan) Car Guy Racing | Ferrari 296 GT3 2 Ferrari 488 GT3 Evo 2020 4 | Ferrari F163CE 3.0 L Turbo V6 2 Ferrari F154CB 3.9 L Turbo V8 4 | 1 | (Japan) Takeshi Kimura | PA | 2, 4–5 |
| (China) Climax Racing | Mercedes-AMG GT3 Evo | Mercedes-AMG M159 6.2 L V8 | 2 | (Denmark) Dennis Lind | PA | All |
| (China) Climax Racing | Mercedes-AMG GT3 Evo | Mercedes-AMG M159 6.2 L V8 | 2 | (China) Zhou Bihuang | PA | All |
| (China) Climax Racing | Mercedes-AMG GT3 Evo | Mercedes-AMG M159 6.2 L V8 | 3 | (China) Bian Ye (Note: Bian Ye used the name Bian Hao for the last two rounds.) | Am | All |
| (China) Climax Racing | Mercedes-AMG GT3 Evo | Mercedes-AMG M159 6.2 L V8 | 3 | (China) Hu Yuqi | Am | All |
| (China) R&B Racing | Porsche 911 GT3 R (992) | Porsche M97/80 4.2 L Flat-6 | 4 | (China) Lu Wei (Note: Wei was a Chinese driver who competed under a Canadian licence in rounds 1 and a Chinese licence in rounds 2–6.) | PA | All |
| (China) R&B Racing | Porsche 911 GT3 R (992) | Porsche M97/80 4.2 L Flat-6 | 4 | (Norway) Dennis Olsen | PA | 1–2, 4 |
| (China) R&B Racing | Porsche 911 GT3 R (992) | Porsche M97/80 4.2 L Flat-6 | 4 | (France) Patrick Pilet | PA | 3, 5–6 |
| (China) R&B Racing | Porsche 911 GT3 R (992) | Porsche M97/80 4.2 L Flat-6 | 87 | (China) Leo Ye Hongli | S | All |
| (China) R&B Racing | Porsche 911 GT3 R (992) | Porsche M97/80 4.2 L Flat-6 | 87 | (China) Yuan Bo | S | All |
| (Japan) PLUS with BMW Team Studie | BMW M4 GT3 | BMW S58B30T0 3.0 L Turbo V8 | 5 | (Japan) Seiji Ara | PA | 2–5 |
| (Japan) PLUS with BMW Team Studie | BMW M4 GT3 | BMW S58B30T0 3.0 L Turbo V8 | 5 | (Japan) Tomohide Yamaguchi | PA | 2–5 |
| (Japan) Comet Racing | Ferrari 488 GT3 Evo 2020 | Ferrari F154CB 3.9 L Turbo V8 | 7 | (Japan) Yorikatsu Tsujiko | Am | 2–5 |
| (Japan) Comet Racing | Ferrari 488 GT3 Evo 2020 | Ferrari F154CB 3.9 L Turbo V8 | 7 | (Japan) Yusuke Yamasaki | Am | 2–5 |
| (New Zealand) EBM Giga Racing | Porsche 911 GT3 R (992) | Porsche M97/80 4.2 L Flat-6 | 8 | (New Zealand) Reid Harker | PA | 1 |
| (New Zealand) EBM Giga Racing | Porsche 911 GT3 R (992) | Porsche M97/80 4.2 L Flat-6 | 8 | (Indonesia) Setiawan Santoso | PA | 1 |
| (New Zealand) EBM | Porsche 911 GT3 R (992) | Porsche M97/80 4.2 L Flat-6 | 8 | (Indonesia) Setiawan Santoso | PA | 2–3, 6 |
| (New Zealand) EBM | Porsche 911 GT3 R (992) | Porsche M97/80 4.2 L Flat-6 | 8 | (New Zealand) Reid Harker | PA | 2–3 |
| (New Zealand) EBM | Porsche 911 GT3 R (992) | Porsche M97/80 4.2 L Flat-6 | 8 | (New Zealand) Earl Bamber | PA | 5 |
| (New Zealand) EBM | Porsche 911 GT3 R (992) | Porsche M97/80 4.2 L Flat-6 | 8 | (Malaysia) Adrian Henry D'Silva | PA | 5 |
| (New Zealand) EBM | Porsche 911 GT3 R (992) | Porsche M97/80 4.2 L Flat-6 | 8 | (Thailand) Tanart Sathienthirakul | PA | 6 |
| (New Zealand) EBM | Porsche 911 GT3 R (992) | Porsche M97/80 4.2 L Flat-6 | 61 | (Malaysia) Adrian Henry D'Silva | PA | 6 |
| (New Zealand) EBM | Porsche 911 GT3 R (992) | Porsche M97/80 4.2 L Flat-6 | 61 | (New Zealand) Reid Harker | PA | 6 |
| (Japan) Bingo Racing | Chevrolet Corvette C7 GT3-R | Chevrolet 6.2 L V8 | 9 | (Japan) Akira Iida | PA | 2 |
| (Japan) Bingo Racing | Chevrolet Corvette C7 GT3-R | Chevrolet 6.2 L V8 | 9 | (Japan) Shinji Takei | PA | 2 |
| (Hong Kong) Audi Sport Asia Team Absolute | Audi R8 LMS Evo II | Audi DAR 5.2 L V10 | 11 | (Indonesia) Andrew Haryanto | PA | All |
| (Hong Kong) Audi Sport Asia Team Absolute | Audi R8 LMS Evo II | Audi DAR 5.2 L V10 | 11 | (China) James Yu Kuai | PA | All |
| (Hong Kong) Audi Sport Asia Team Absolute | Audi R8 LMS Evo II | Audi DAR 5.2 L V10 | 13 | (China) Franky Cheng Congfu | PA | All |
| (Hong Kong) Audi Sport Asia Team Absolute | Audi R8 LMS Evo II | Audi DAR 5.2 L V10 | 13 | (China) Sun Jingzu | PA | All |
| (Thailand) B-Quik Racing | Audi R8 LMS Evo II | Audi DAR 5.2 L V10 | 26 | (Sri Lanka) Eshan Pieris | PA | 1 |
| (Thailand) B-Quik Racing | Audi R8 LMS Evo II | Audi DAR 5.2 L V10 | 26 | (Netherlands) Henk Kiks | PA | 1 |
| (Thailand) B-Quik Absolute Racing | Audi R8 LMS Evo II | Audi DAR 5.2 L V10 | 26 | (Netherlands) Henk Kiks | Am | 6 |
| (Thailand) B-Quik Absolute Racing | Audi R8 LMS Evo II | Audi DAR 5.2 L V10 | 26 | (Thailand) Adisak Tangphuncharoen | Am | 6 |
| (Thailand) B-Quik Absolute Racing | Audi R8 LMS Evo II | Audi DAR 5.2 L V10 | 62 | (Malaysia) Akash Nandy | S | 6 |
| (Thailand) B-Quik Absolute Racing | Audi R8 LMS Evo II | Audi DAR 5.2 L V10 | 62 | (Sri Lanka) Eshan Pieris | S | 6 |
| (Chinese Taipei) HubAuto Racing with GTO Racing | Porsche 911 GT3 R (992) | Porsche M97/80 4.2 L Flat-6 | 14 | (Chinese Taipei) Brian Lee | PA | All |
| (Chinese Taipei) HubAuto Racing with GTO Racing | Porsche 911 GT3 R (992) | Porsche M97/80 4.2 L Flat-6 | 14 | (Japan) Hideto Yasuoka | PA | All |
| (Chinese Taipei) HubAuto Racing | Porsche 911 GT3 R (992) | Porsche M97/80 4.2 L Flat-6 | 72 | (Chinese Taipei) Morris Chen | PA | All |
| (Chinese Taipei) HubAuto Racing | Porsche 911 GT3 R (992) | Porsche M97/80 4.2 L Flat-6 | 72 | (Portugal) Álvaro Parente | PA | All |
| (Chinese Taipei) FIST - Team AAI | BMW M4 GT3 | BMW S58B30T0 3.0 L Turbo I6 | 15 | (Chinese Taipei) Kevin Chen | PA | 1 |
| (Chinese Taipei) FIST - Team AAI | BMW M4 GT3 | BMW S58B30T0 3.0 L Turbo I6 | 15 | (Germany) Jens Klingmann | PA | 1 |
| (Chinese Taipei) FIST - Team AAI | BMW M4 GT3 | BMW S58B30T0 3.0 L Turbo I6 | 91 | (Chinese Taipei) Chen Jun-san | PA | 1 |
| (Chinese Taipei) FIST - Team AAI | BMW M4 GT3 | BMW S58B30T0 3.0 L Turbo I6 | 91 | (Finland) Jesse Krohn | PA | 1 |
| (Chinese Taipei) GH - Team AAI | BMW M4 GT3 | BMW S58B30T0 3.0 L Turbo I6 | 91 | (Chinese Taipei) Kevin Chen | PA | 6 |
| (Chinese Taipei) GH - Team AAI | BMW M4 GT3 | BMW S58B30T0 3.0 L Turbo I6 | 91 | (Germany) Jens Klingmann | PA | 6 |
| (Chinese Taipei) GH - Team AAI | BMW M4 GT3 | BMW S58B30T0 3.0 L Turbo I6 | 90 | (Chinese Taipei) Chen Jun-san | PA | 6 |
| (Chinese Taipei) GH - Team AAI | BMW M4 GT3 | BMW S58B30T0 3.0 L Turbo I6 | 90 | (Finland) Jesse Krohn | PA | 6 |
| (Japan) ABSSA Motorsport | McLaren 720S GT3 | McLaren M840T 4.0L Turbo V8 | 16 | (Japan) Keita Sawa | PA | 2–3 |
| (Japan) ABSSA Motorsport | McLaren 720S GT3 | McLaren M840T 4.0L Turbo V8 | 16 | (Japan) Kiwamu Katayama | PA | 2 |
| (Japan) ABSSA Motorsport | McLaren 720S GT3 | McLaren M840T 4.0L Turbo V8 | 16 | (Japan) Masataka Inoue | PA | 3 |
| (Japan) CREF Motor Sport | McLaren 720S GT3 | McLaren M840T 4.0L Turbo V8 | 17 | (Japan) Masataka Inoue | PA | 2, 4 |
| (Japan) CREF Motor Sport | McLaren 720S GT3 | McLaren M840T 4.0L Turbo V8 | 17 | (Japan) Yuko Suzuki | PA | 2, 4 |
| (Japan) CREF Motor Sport | McLaren 720S GT3 | McLaren M840T 4.0L Turbo V8 | 17 | (Japan) Katsuaki Kubota | PA | 3 |
| (Japan) CREF Motor Sport | McLaren 720S GT3 | McLaren M840T 4.0L Turbo V8 | 17 | (Japan) Atsushi Miyake | PA | 3 |
| (Japan) Porsche Center Okazaki | Porsche 911 GT3 R (992) | Porsche M97/80 4.2 L Flat-6 | 18 | (Japan) Yuta Kamimura | PA | All |
| (Japan) Porsche Center Okazaki | Porsche 911 GT3 R (992) | Porsche M97/80 4.2 L Flat-6 | 18 | (Japan) Hiroaki Nagai | PA | All |
| (Japan) The Spirit of FFF Racing | Lamborghini Huracán GT3 Evo | Lamborghini DGF 5.2 L V10 | 19 | (Japan) Mineki Okura | Am | 2–5 |
| (Japan) The Spirit of FFF Racing | Lamborghini Huracán GT3 Evo | Lamborghini DGF 5.2 L V10 | 19 | (Japan) Hiroshi Hamaguchi | Am | 2, 4–5 |
| (Japan) The Spirit of FFF Racing | Lamborghini Huracán GT3 Evo | Lamborghini DGF 5.2 L V10 | 19 | (Japan) Takuya Shirasaka | Am | 3 |
| (Hong Kong) KCMG | Honda NSX GT3 Evo22 | Honda JNC1 3.5 L Turbo V6 | 22 | (Hong Kong) Paul Ip | PA | 2–5 |
| (Hong Kong) KCMG | Honda NSX GT3 Evo22 | Honda JNC1 3.5 L Turbo V6 | 22 | (Italy) Edoardo Liberati | PA | 2–5 |
| (Japan) NK Racing | Porsche 911 GT3 R (992) | Porsche M97/80 4.2 L Flat-6 | 25 | (Japan) Tsubasa Kondo | PA | All |
| (Japan) NK Racing | Porsche 911 GT3 R (992) | Porsche M97/80 4.2 L Flat-6 | 25 | (Japan) Kiyoshi Uchiyama | PA | All |
| (China) Phantom Pro Racing | Audi R8 LMS Evo II | Audi DAR 5.2 L V10 | 29 | (China) Cao Qi | S | All |
| (China) Phantom Pro Racing | Audi R8 LMS Evo II | Audi DAR 5.2 L V10 | 29 | (China) Ling Kang | S | All |
| (China) Phantom Pro Racing | Audi R8 LMS Evo II | Audi DAR 5.2 L V10 | 333 | (China) Chris Chia On | PA | All |
| (China) Phantom Pro Racing | Audi R8 LMS Evo II | Audi DAR 5.2 L V10 | 333 | (Denmark) Mikkel Mac | PA | All |
| (Hong Kong) Modena Motorsports | Porsche 911 GT3 R (992) | Porsche M97/80 4.2 L Flat-6 | 30 | (Hong Kong) Antares Au | Am | 6 |
| (Japan) Team GMB | Mercedes-AMG GT3 Evo | Mercedes-AMG M159 6.2 L V8 | 33 | (Japan) Hiroaki Hatano | PA | 2–4 |
| (Japan) Team GMB | Mercedes-AMG GT3 Evo | Mercedes-AMG M159 6.2 L V8 | 33 | (Japan) Shinya Hosokawa | PA | 2–4 |
| (Hong Kong) Craft-Bamboo Racing | Mercedes-AMG GT3 Evo | Mercedes-AMG M159 6.2 L V8 | 37 | (China) Anthony Liu Xu | PA | All |
| (Hong Kong) Craft-Bamboo Racing | Mercedes-AMG GT3 Evo | Mercedes-AMG M159 6.2 L V8 | 37 | (Germany) Fabian Schiller | PA | 1, 4 |
| (Hong Kong) Craft-Bamboo Racing | Mercedes-AMG GT3 Evo | Mercedes-AMG M159 6.2 L V8 | 37 | (Spain) Daniel Juncadella | PA | 2–3, 5–6 |
| (Hong Kong) Craft-Bamboo Racing | Mercedes-AMG GT3 Evo | Mercedes-AMG M159 6.2 L V8 | 77 | (Germany) Maximilian Götz | PA | 1–3 |
| (Hong Kong) Craft-Bamboo Racing | Mercedes-AMG GT3 Evo | Mercedes-AMG M159 6.2 L V8 | 77 | (Chinese Taipei) Jeffrey Lee | PA | 1–3 |
| (Hong Kong) Craft-Bamboo Racing | Mercedes-AMG GT3 Evo | Mercedes-AMG M159 6.2 L V8 | 85 | (Germany) Maximilian Götz | PA | 4–6 |
| (Hong Kong) Craft-Bamboo Racing | Mercedes-AMG GT3 Evo | Mercedes-AMG M159 6.2 L V8 | 85 | (Chinese Taipei) Jeffrey Lee | PA | 4–6 |
| (Japan) D'station Racing | Aston Martin Vantage AMR GT3 | Aston Martin M177 4.0 L Turbo V8 | 47 | (Japan) Tomonobu Fujii | PA | 2–6 |
| (Japan) D'station Racing | Aston Martin Vantage AMR GT3 | Aston Martin M177 4.0 L Turbo V8 | 47 | (Japan) Satoshi Hoshino | PA | 2–6 |
| (Australia) AMAC Motorsport | Porsche 911 GT3 R (2017) | Porsche 4.0 L Flat-6 | 51 | (Australia) Andrew Macpherson | Am | All |
| (Australia) AMAC Motorsport | Porsche 911 GT3 R (2017) | Porsche 4.0 L Flat-6 | 51 | (Australia) William Ben Porter | Am | All |
| (Japan) Team Uematsu | McLaren 720S GT3 | McLaren M840T 4.0L Turbo V8 | 55 | (Japan) Tadao Uematsu | Am | 2, 4 |
| (Japan) LM Corsa | Ferrari 296 GT3 | Ferrari F163CE 3.0 L Turbo V6 | 60 | (Japan) Kei Nakanishi | PA | 2–5 |
| (Japan) LM Corsa | Ferrari 296 GT3 | Ferrari F163CE 3.0 L Turbo V6 | 60 | (Japan) Shigekazu Wakisaka | PA | 2–5 |
| (Australia) Triple Eight JMR | Mercedes-AMG GT3 Evo | Mercedes-AMG M159 6.2 L V8 | 88 | (Malaysia) Prince Abu Bakar Ibrahim | PA | All |
| (Australia) Triple Eight JMR | Mercedes-AMG GT3 Evo | Mercedes-AMG M159 6.2 L V8 | 88 | (Germany) Luca Stolz | PA | 1–4 |
| (Australia) Triple Eight JMR | Mercedes-AMG GT3 Evo | Mercedes-AMG M159 6.2 L V8 | 88 | (Canada) Mikael Grenier | PA | 5–6 |
| (Australia) Triple Eight JMR | Mercedes-AMG GT3 Evo | Mercedes-AMG M159 6.2 L V8 | 888 | (Malaysia) Prince Jefri Ibrahim | PA | All |
| (Australia) Triple Eight JMR | Mercedes-AMG GT3 Evo | Mercedes-AMG M159 6.2 L V8 | 888 | (Australia) Broc Feeney | PA | 1, 3–4, 6 |
| (Australia) Triple Eight JMR | Mercedes-AMG GT3 Evo | Mercedes-AMG M159 6.2 L V8 | 888 | (New Zealand) Richie Stanaway | PA | 2, 5 |
| (Japan) K-tunes Racing | Lexus RC F GT3 | Toyota 2UR-GSE 5.4 L V8 | 96 | (Japan) Morio Nitta | PA | 2–3, 5 |
| (Japan) K-tunes Racing | Lexus RC F GT3 | Toyota 2UR-GSE 5.4 L V8 | 96 | (Japan) Kazunori Suenaga | PA | 2–3, 5 |
| (China) Harmony Racing | Ferrari 488 GT3 Evo 2020 | Ferrari F154CB 3.9 L Turbo V8 | 99 | (China) Xing Yanbin | Am | 6 |
| (China) Harmony Racing | Ferrari 488 GT3 Evo 2020 | Ferrari F154CB 3.9 L Turbo V8 | 99 | (China) Wu Ruihua | Am | 6 |
| (Thailand) YK Motorsports BBR by Sunoco | Mercedes-AMG GT3 Evo | Mercedes-AMG M159 6.2 L V8 | 114 | (Thailand) Dechathorn Phuakkarawut | Am | 1 |
| (Thailand) YK Motorsports BBR by Sunoco | Mercedes-AMG GT3 Evo | Mercedes-AMG M159 6.2 L V8 | 114 | (Thailand) Pasarit Promsombat | Am | 1 |
| (Australia) Melbourne Performance Centre | Audi R8 LMS Evo II | Audi DAR 5.2 L V10 | 222 | (Australia) Ash Samadi | Am | 6 |
| (Japan) RunUp Sports | Nissan GT-R Nismo GT3 | Nissan VR38DETT 3.8 L Twin-turbocharged V6 | 360 | (Japan) Masaaki Nishikawa | Am | 2–5 |
| (Japan) RunUp Sports | Nissan GT-R Nismo GT3 | Nissan VR38DETT 3.8 L Twin-turbocharged V6 | 360 | (Japan) Atsushi Tanaka | Am | 2–5 |
| (Japan) Team 5ZIGEN | Nissan GT-R Nismo GT3 | Nissan VR38DETT 3.8 L Twin Turbo V6 | 500 | (Japan) "Hirobon" | PA | 2–3, 5 |
| (Japan) Team 5ZIGEN | Nissan GT-R Nismo GT3 | Nissan VR38DETT 3.8 L Twin Turbo V6 | 500 | (Japan) Shintaro Kawabata | PA | 2–3, 5 |
| (Japan) Maezawa Racing | Ferrari 488 GT3 Evo 2020 | Ferrari F154CB 3.9 L Turbo V8 | 555 | (Thailand) Piti Bhirombhakdi | PA | 2–5 |
| (Japan) Maezawa Racing | Ferrari 488 GT3 Evo 2020 | Ferrari F154CB 3.9 L Turbo V8 | 555 | (Japan) Naoki Yokomizo | PA | 2–5 |
| (Thailand) AAS Motorsport by Absolute Racing | Porsche 911 GT3 R (992) | Porsche M97/80 4.2 L Flat-6 | 911 | (Thailand) Vutthikorn Inthraphuvasak | PA | All |
| (Thailand) AAS Motorsport by Absolute Racing | Porsche 911 GT3 R (992) | Porsche M97/80 4.2 L Flat-6 | 911 | (Belgium) Alessio Picariello | PA | 1–2, 4–5 |
| (Thailand) AAS Motorsport by Absolute Racing | Porsche 911 GT3 R (992) | Porsche M97/80 4.2 L Flat-6 | 911 | (Austria) Klaus Bachler | PA | 3, 6 |
| (Hong Kong) Absolute Racing | Porsche 911 GT3 R (992) | Porsche M97/80 4.2 L Flat-6 | 992 | (China) Bao Jinlong | PA | All |
| (Hong Kong) Absolute Racing | Porsche 911 GT3 R (992) | Porsche M97/80 4.2 L Flat-6 | 992 | (Switzerland) Alexandre Imperatori | PA | 1–3 |
| (Hong Kong) Absolute Racing | Porsche 911 GT3 R (992) | Porsche M97/80 4.2 L Flat-6 | 992 | (Italy) Matteo Cairoli | PA | 4–5 |
| (Hong Kong) Absolute Racing | Porsche 911 GT3 R (992) | Porsche M97/80 4.2 L Flat-6 | 992 | (Switzerland) Edoardo Mortara | PA | 6 |
GT4
| (Japan) CREF Motor Sport | McLaren Artura GT4 | McLaren M630 3.0 L Turbo V6 | 27 | (Japan) Masataka Inoue | SA | 5 |
| (Japan) CREF Motor Sport | McLaren Artura GT4 | McLaren M630 3.0 L Turbo V6 | 27 | (Japan) Yuko Suzuki | SA | 5 |
| Toyota Gazoo Racing Indonesia | Toyota GR Supra GT4 | BMW B58B30 3.0 L Twin Turbo I6 | 39 | (Indonesia) Haridarma Manoppo | SA | 1, 5–6 |
| Toyota Gazoo Racing Indonesia | Toyota GR Supra GT4 | BMW B58B30 3.0 L Twin Turbo I6 | 39 | (Japan) Seita Nonaka | SA | 1, 5–6 |
| (Japan) D'station Racing | Aston Martin Vantage AMR GT4 | Aston Martin M177 4.0 L Turbo V8 | 48 | (Japan) Kenji Hama | Am | 5 |
| (Japan) D'station Racing | Aston Martin Vantage AMR GT4 | Aston Martin M177 4.0 L Turbo V8 | 48 | (Japan) Tatsuya Hoshino | Am | 5 |
| (Japan) YZ Racing with Studie | BMW M4 GT4 Gen II | BMW S55 3.0 L Twin Turbo I6 | 50 | (Japan) Masaki Kano | SA | 2–5 |
| (Japan) YZ Racing with Studie | BMW M4 GT4 Gen II | BMW S55 3.0 L Twin Turbo I6 | 50 | (Japan) Manabu Orido | SA | 2–5 |
| (Japan) Akiland Racing | Toyota GR Supra GT4 | BMW B58B30 3.0 L Twin Turbo I6 | 71 | (Japan) Masayoshi Oyama | SA | 2–3, 5 |
| (Japan) Akiland Racing | Toyota GR Supra GT4 | BMW B58B30 3.0 L Twin Turbo I6 | 71 | (Japan) Ryohei Sakaguchi | SA | 2–3, 5 |
| (Japan) Comet Racing | Mercedes-AMG GT4 | Mercedes-AMG M178 4.0 L V8 | 83 | (Japan) Kazuki Oki | SA | 5 |
| (Japan) Comet Racing | Mercedes-AMG GT4 | Mercedes-AMG M178 4.0 L V8 | 83 | (Japan) Risa Oogushi | SA | 5 |
| (Japan) K-tunes Racing | Toyota GR Supra GT4 | BMW B58B30 3.0 L Twin Turbo I6 | 97 | (Japan) Hiromitsu Fujii | Am | 2–3 |
| (Japan) K-tunes Racing | Toyota GR Supra GT4 | BMW B58B30 3.0 L Twin Turbo I6 | 97 | (Japan) Masanori Nogami | Am | 2–3 |
| (Japan) Checkshop Caymania Racing | Porsche 718 Cayman GT4 RS Clubsport | Porsche 4.0 L Flat-6 | 718 | (Japan) Sho Kobayashi | Am | 2–5 |
| (Japan) Checkshop Caymania Racing | Porsche 718 Cayman GT4 RS Clubsport | Porsche 4.0 L Flat-6 | 718 | (Japan) Naohiko Otsuka | Am | 2–5 |

| Icon | Class |
Drivers
| S | Silver Cup |
| PA | Pro-Am Cup |
| SA | Silver-Am Cup |
| Am | Am Cup |

== Race results ==
Bold indicates overall winner for each car class (GT3 and GT4).

=== GT3 ===
| Round | | Circuit | Pole position | Silver winners | Pro/Am winners | Am winners |
|---|---|---|---|---|---|---|
| 1 | R1 | (Thailand) Buriram | (Australia) No. 88 Triple Eight JMR | (China) No. 87 R&B Racing | **(Australia) No. 88 Triple Eight JMR** | (China) No. 3 Climax Racing |
| 1 | R1 | (Thailand) Buriram | (Malaysia) Prince Abu Bakar Ibrahim (Germany) Luca Stolz | (China) Leo Ye Hongli (China) Yuan Bo | **(Malaysia) Prince Abu Bakar Ibrahim** **(Germany) Luca Stolz** | (China) Bian Ye (China) Hu Yuqi |
| 1 | R2 | (Thailand) Buriram | (Hong Kong) No. 911 AAS Motorsport by Absolute Racing | (China) No. 29 Phantom Pro Racing | **(Hong Kong) No. 37 Craft-Bamboo Racing** | (Thailand) No. 114 YK Motorsports BBR by SUNOCO |
| 1 | R2 | (Thailand) Buriram | (Thailand) Vutthikorn Inthraphuvasak (Belgium) Alessio Picariello | (China) Cao Qi (China) Ling Kang | **(China) Anthony Liu Xu** **(Germany) Fabian Schiller** | (Thailand) Dechathorn Phuakkarawut (Thailand) Pasarit Promsombat |
| 2 | R1 | (Japan) Fuji Speedway | (China) No. 87 R&B Racing | (China) No. 29 Phantom Pro Racing | **(Japan) No. 9 Bingo Racing** | (China) No. 3 Climax Racing |
| 2 | R1 | (Japan) Fuji Speedway | (China) Leo Ye Hongli (China) Yuan Bo | (China) Cao Qi (China) Ling Kang | **(Japan) Akira Iida** **(Japan) Shinji Takei** | (China) Bian Ye (China) Hu Yuqi |
| 2 | R2 | (Japan) Fuji Speedway | (Hong Kong) No. 37 Craft-Bamboo Racing | (China) No. 87 R&B Racing | **(Australia) No. 88 Triple Eight JMR** | (Japan) No. 7 Comet Racing |
| 2 | R2 | (Japan) Fuji Speedway | (Spain) Daniel Juncadella (China) Anthony Xu Liu | (China) Leo Ye Hongli (China) Yuan Bo | **(Malaysia) Prince Abu Bakar Ibrahim** **(Germany) Luca Stolz** | (Japan) Yorikatsu Tsujiko (Japan) Yusuke Yamasaki |
| 3 | R1 | (Japan) Suzuka | (Japan) No. 16 ABSSA Motorsport | (China) No. 87 R&B Racing | **(Hong Kong) No. 911 AAS Motorsport by Absolute Racing** | (China) No. 3 Climax Racing |
| 3 | R1 | (Japan) Suzuka | (Japan) Keita Sawa (Japan) Masataka Inoue | (China) Leo Ye Hongli (China) Yuan Bo | **(Austria) Klaus Bachler** **(Thailand) Vutthikorn Inthraphuvasak** | (China) Bian Ye (China) Hu Yuqi |
| 3 | R2 | (Japan) Suzuka | (Hong Kong) No. 37 Craft-Bamboo Racing | (China) No. 87 R&B Racing | **(Hong Kong) No. 37 Craft-Bamboo Racing** | (Australia) No. 51 AMAC Motorsport |
| 3 | R2 | (Japan) Suzuka | (Spain) Daniel Juncadella (China) Anthony Liu Xu | (China) Leo Ye Hongli (China) Yuan Bo | **(Spain) Daniel Juncadella** **(China) Anthony Liu Xu** | (Australia) Andrew Macpherson (Australia) William Ben Porter |
| 4 | R1 | (Japan) Motegi | (China) No. 29 Phantom Pro Racing | (China) No. 29 Phantom Pro Racing | **(China) No. 11 Audi Sport Asia Team Absolute** | (Japan) No. 19 The Spirit of FFF Racing |
| 4 | R1 | (Japan) Motegi | (China) Cao Qi (China) Ling Kang | (China) Cao Qi (China) Ling Kang | **(Indonesia) Andrew Haryanto** **(China) James Yu Kuai** | (Japan) Hiroshi Hamaguchi (Japan) Mineki Okura |
| 4 | R2 | (Japan) Motegi | (Hong Kong) No. 992 Absolute Racing | (China) No. 87 R&B Racing | **(China) No. 4 R&B Racing** | (Japan) No. 19 The Spirit of FFF Racing |
| 4 | R2 | (Japan) Motegi | (Italy) Matteo Cairoli (China) Bao Jinlong | (China) Leo Ye Hongli (China) Yuan Bo | **(China) Lu Wei** **(Norway) Dennis Olsen** | (Japan) Hiroshi Hamaguchi (Japan) Mineki Okura |
| 5 | R1 | (Japan) Okayama | (Hong Kong) No. 911 AAS Motorsport by Absolute Racing | (China) No. 29 Phantom Pro Racing | **(Hong Kong) No. 37 Craft-Bamboo Racing** | (China) No. 29 Climax Racing |
| 5 | R1 | (Japan) Okayama | (Thailand) Vutthikorn Inthraphuvasak (Belgium) Alessio Picariello | (China) Cao Qi (China) Ling Kang | **(Spain) Daniel Juncadella** **(China) Anthony Liu Xu** | (China) Bian Ye (China) Hu Yuqi |
| 5 | R2 | (Japan) Okayama | (Hong Kong) No. 911 AAS Motorsport by Absolute Racing | (China) No. 29 Phantom Pro Racing | **(Japan) No. 555 Maezawa Racing** | (Japan) No. 19 The Spirit of FFF Racing |
| 5 | R2 | (Japan) Okayama | (Thailand) Vutthikorn Inthraphuvasak (Belgium) Alessio Picariello | (China) Cao Qi (China) Ling Kang | **(Thailand) Piti Bhirombhakdi** **(Japan) Naoki Yokomizo** | (Japan) Hiroshi Hamaguchi (Japan) Mineki Okura |
| 6 | R1 | (Malaysia) Sepang | (China) No. 11 Audi Sport Asia Team Absolute | (China) No. 87 R&B Racing | (China) No. 11 Audi Sport Asia Team Absolute | (Hong Kong) No. 30 Modena Motorsport |
| 6 | R1 | (Malaysia) Sepang | (Indonesia) Andrew Haryanto (China) James Yu Kuai | (China) Leo Ye Hongli (China) Yuan Bo | **(Indonesia) Andrew Haryanto** **(China) James Yu Kuai** | (Hong Kong) Antares Au |
| 6 | R2 | (Malaysia) Sepang | (Chinese Taipei) No. 72 HubAuto Racing | (China) No. 87 R&B Racing | **(China) No. 4 R&B Racing** | (Hong Kong) No. 30 Modena Motorsport |
| 6 | R2 | (Malaysia) Sepang | (Chinese Taipei) Morris Chen (Portugal) Álvaro Parente | (China) Leo Ye Hongli (China) Yuan Bo | **(China) Lu Wei** **(France) Patrick Pilet** | (Hong Kong) Antares Au |

=== GT4 ===
| Round | | Circuit | Pole position | GT4 Silver-Am winner | GT4 Am winner |
|---|---|---|---|---|---|
| 1 | R1 | (Thailand) Buriram | No. 39 Toyota Gazoo Racing Indonesia | **No. 39 Toyota Gazoo Racing Indonesia** | No Entries |
| 1 | R1 | (Thailand) Buriram | (Indonesia) Haridarma Manoppo (Japan) Seita Nonaka | **(Indonesia) Haridarma Manoppo** **(Japan) Seita Nonaka** | No Entries |
| 1 | R2 | (Thailand) Buriram | No. 39 Toyota Gazoo Racing Indonesia | **No. 39 Toyota Gazoo Racing Indonesia** | No Entries |
| 1 | R2 | (Thailand) Buriram | (Indonesia) Haridarma Manoppo (Japan) Seita Nonaka | **(Indonesia) Haridarma Manoppo** **(Japan) Seita Nonaka** | No Entries |
| 2 | R1 | (Japan) Fuji Speedway | (Japan) No. 50 YZ Racing with Studie | **(Japan) No. 50 YZ Racing with Studie** | (Japan) No. 718 Checkshop Caymania Racing |
| 2 | R1 | (Japan) Fuji Speedway | (Japan) Masaki Kano (Japan) Manabu Orido | **(Japan) Masaki Kano** **(Japan) Manabu Orido** | (Japan) Sho Kobayashi (Japan) Naohiko Otsuka |
| 2 | R2 | (Japan) Fuji Speedway | (Japan) No. 50 YZ Racing with Studie | (Japan) No. 71 Akiland Racing | **(Japan) No. 718 Checkshop Caymania Racing** |
| 2 | R2 | (Japan) Fuji Speedway | (Japan) Masaki Kano (Japan) Manabu Orido | (Japan) Masayoshi Oyama (Japan) Ryohei Sakaguchi | **(Japan) Sho Kobayashi** **(Japan) Naohiko Otsuka** |
| 3 | R1 | (Japan) Suzuka | (Japan) No. 50 YZ Racing with Studie | **(Japan) No. 50 YZ Racing with Studie** | (Japan) No. 718 Checkshop Caymania Racing |
| 3 | R1 | (Japan) Suzuka | (Japan) Masaki Kano (Japan) Manabu Orido | **(Japan) Masaki Kano** **(Japan) Manabu Orido** | (Japan) Sho Kobayashi (Japan) Naohiko Otsuka |
| 3 | R2 | (Japan) Suzuka | (Japan) No. 71 Akiland Racing | **(Japan) No. 50 YZ Racing with Studie** | (Japan) No. 718 Checkshop Caymania Racing |
| 3 | R2 | (Japan) Suzuka | (Japan) Masayoshi Oyama (Japan) Ryohei Sakaguchi | **(Japan) Masaki Kano** **(Japan) Manabu Orido** | (Japan) Sho Kobayashi (Japan) Naohiko Otsuka |
| 4 | R1 | (Japan) Motegi | (Japan) No. 718 Checkshop Caymania Racing | **(Japan) No. 50 YZ Racing with Studie** | (Japan) No. 718 Checkshop Caymania Racing |
| 4 | R1 | (Japan) Motegi | (Japan) Sho Kobayashi (Japan) Naohiko Otsuka | **(Japan) Masaki Kano** **(Japan) Manabu Orido** | (Japan) Sho Kobayashi (Japan) Naohiko Otsuka |
| 4 | R2 | (Japan) Motegi | (Japan) No. 50 YZ Racing with Studie | **(Japan) No. 50 YZ Racing with Studie** | (Japan) No. 718 Checkshop Caymania Racing |
| 4 | R2 | (Japan) Motegi | (Japan) Masaki Kano (Japan) Manabu Orido | **(Japan) Masaki Kano** **(Japan) Manabu Orido** | (Japan) Sho Kobayashi (Japan) Naohiko Otsuka |
| 5 | R1 | (Japan) Okayama | (Japan) No. 718 Checkshop Caymania Racing | **No. 39 Toyota Gazoo Racing Indonesia** | (Japan) No. 718 Checkshop Caymania Racing |
| 5 | R1 | (Japan) Okayama | (Japan) Sho Kobayashi (Japan) Naohiko Otsuka | **(Indonesia) Haridarma Manoppo** **(Japan) Seita Nonaka** | (Japan) Sho Kobayashi (Japan) Naohiko Otsuka |
| 5 | R2 | (Japan) Okayama | (Japan) No. 71 Akiland Racing | **(Japan) No. 50 YZ Racing with Studie** | (Japan) No. 48 D'Station Racing |
| 5 | R2 | (Japan) Okayama | (Japan) Sho Kobayashi (Japan) Naohiko Otsuka | **(Japan) Masaki Kano** **(Japan) Manabu Orido** | (Japan) Kenji Hama (Japan) Tatsuya Hoshino |
| 6 | R1 | (Malaysia) Sepang | No. 39 Toyota Gazoo Racing Indonesia | **No. 39 Toyota Gazoo Racing Indonesia** | No Entries |
| 6 | R1 | (Malaysia) Sepang | (Indonesia) Haridarma Manoppo (Japan) Seita Nonaka | **(Indonesia) Haridarma Manoppo** **(Japan) Seita Nonaka** | No Entries |
| 6 | R2 | (Malaysia) Sepang | No. 39 Toyota Gazoo Racing Indonesia | **No. 39 Toyota Gazoo Racing Indonesia** | No Entries |
| 6 | R2 | (Malaysia) Sepang | (Indonesia) Haridarma Manoppo (Japan) Seita Nonaka | **(Indonesia) Haridarma Manoppo** **(Japan) Seita Nonaka** | No Entries |

== Championship standings ==
Scoring system

Championship points are awarded for the first ten positions in each race. Entries are required to complete 75% of the winning car's race distance in order to be classified and earn points. Individual drivers are required to participate for a minimum of 25 minutes in order to earn championship points in any race.

| Position | **1st** | **2nd** | **3rd** | **4th** | **5th** | **6th** | **7th** | **8th** | **9th** | **10th** |
| Points | 25 | 18 | 15 | 12 | 10 | 8 | 6 | 4 | 2 | 1 |

=== Drivers' championships ===
==== Overall ====
| Pos. | Driver | Team | BUR (Thailand) | | FUJ (Japan) | | SUZ (Japan) | | MOT (Japan) | | OKA (Japan) | | SEP (Malaysia) | | Points |
GT3
| 1 | (China) Anthony Liu Xu | (Hong Kong) No. 37 Craft-Bamboo Racing | 10 | 1 | 5 | **Ret** | 19 | **1** | 3 | 5 | 1 | 4 | 2 | 10 | 142 |
| 2 | (Malaysia) Prince Abu Bakar Ibrahim | (Australia) No. 88 Triple Eight JMR | **1** | 12 | 14 | 1 | 20 | 2 | 4 | 3 | 4 | 29 | 3 | 3 | 137 |
| 3 | (China) Lu Wei | (China) No. 4 R&B Racing | 5 | 19 | 3 | 3 | 13 | 3 | Ret | 1 | 10 | 3 | 4 | 1 | 133 |
| 4 | (Thailand) Vutthikorn Inthraphuvasak | (Hong Kong) No. 911 AAS Motorsport by Absolute Racing | 2 | **3** | 2 | 23 | 1 | 9 | Ret | 6 | **2** | **2** | Ret | 6 | 130 |
| 5 | (Germany) Luca Stolz | (Australia) No. 88 Triple Eight JMR | **1** | 12 | 14 | 1 | 20 | 2 | 4 | 3 | | | | | 95 |
| 6 | (Belgium) Alessio Picariello | (Hong Kong) No. 911 AAS Motorsport by Absolute Racing | 2 | **3** | 2 | 23 | | | Ret | 6 | **2** | **2** | | | 95 |
| 7 | (Spain) Daniel Juncadella | (Hong Kong) No. 37 Craft-Bamboo Racing | | | 5 | **Ret** | 19 | **1** | | | 1 | 4 | 2 | 10 | 91 |
| 8 | (Indonesia) Andrew Haryanto (China) James Yu Kuai | (Hong Kong) No. 11 Audi Sport Asia Team Absolute | 8 | 17 | 9 | 6 | 4 | 8 | 1 | Ret | 5 | 19 | **1** | 13 | 90 |
| 9 | (China) Leo Ye Hongli (China) Yuan Bo | (China) No. 87 R&B Racing | 3 | 14 | **Ret** | 4 | 7 | 5 | 10 | 8 | Ret | DNS | 6 | 2 | 74 |
| 10 | (Japan) Yuta Kamimura (Japan) Hiroaki Nagai | (Japan) No. 18 Porsche Center Okazaki | 7 | 21 | 15 | 16 | 3 | 11 | 2 | 4 | 8 | 13 | 7 | 5 | 71 |
| 11 | (France) Patrick Pilet | (China) No. 4 R&B Racing | | | | | 13 | 3 | | | 10 | 3 | 4 | 1 | 68 |
| 12 | (Norway) Dennis Olsen | (China) No. 4 R&B Racing | 5 | 19 | 3 | 3 | | | Ret | 1 | | | | | 65 |
| 13 | (China) Bao Jinlong | (Hong Kong) No. 992 Absolute Racing | 6 | Ret | Ret | 10 | 15 | 7 | Ret | **2** | 27 | 5 | 5 | 7 | 59 |
| 14 | (Germany) Fabian Schiller | (Hong Kong) No. 37 Craft-Bamboo Racing | 10 | 1 | | | | | 3 | 5 | | | | | 51 |
| 15 | (Denmark) Dennis Lind (China) Zhou Bihuang | (China) No. 2 Climax Racing | 4 | Ret | 4 | 25 | 5 | 4 | 19 | 23 | Ret | 9 | Ret | 16 | 48 |
| 16 | (Thailand) Piti Bhirombhakdi (Japan) Naoki Yokomizo | (Japan) No. 555 Maezawa Racing | | | 10 | 15 | 6 | 12 | 5 | 11 | Ret | 1 | | | 44 |
| 17 | (Canada) Mikael Grenier | (Australia) No. 88 Triple Eight JMR | | | | | | | | | 4 | 29 | 3 | 3 | 42 |
| 18 | (Austria) Klaus Bachler | (Hong Kong) No. 911 AAS Motorsport by Absolute Racing | | | | | 1 | 9 | | | | | Ret | 6 | 35 |
| 19 | (Japan) "Hirobon" (Japan) Shintaro Kawabata | (Japan) No. 500 Team 5ZIGEN | | | 27 | Ret | 2 | 31 | | | 3 | 11 | | | 33 |
| 20 | (China) Chris Chia On (Denmark) Mikkel Mac | (China) No. 333 Phantom Pro Racing | 20 | 6 | 6 | Ret | 10 | 17 | Ret | 19 | 13 | 30 | 8 | 4 | 33 |
| 21 | (Germany) Maximilian Götz (Chinese Taipei) Jeffrey Lee | (Hong Kong) No. 77 Craft-Bamboo Racing (Hong Kong) No. 85 Craft-Bamboo Racing | 16 | 2 | 21 | 32 | 14 | 14 | 8 | 7 | 26 | 10 | 14 | 15 | 29 |
| 22 | (Italy) Matteo Cairoli | (Hong Kong) No. 992 Absolute Racing | | | | | | | Ret | **2** | 27 | 5 | | | 28 |
| 23 | (Japan) Akira Iida (Japan) Shinji Takei | (Japan) No. 9 Bingo Racing | | | 1 | Ret | | | | | | | | | 25 |
| 24 | (Indonesia) Setiawan Santoso | (New Zealand) No. 8 EBM Giga Racing | 12 | 11 | 11 | 2 | Ret | 27 | | | | | 21 | 18 | 18 |
| 24 | (New Zealand) Reid Harker | (New Zealand) No. 8 EBM Giga Racing | 12 | 11 | 11 | 2 | Ret | 27 | | | | | | | 18 |
| 25 | (China) Franky Cheng Congfu (China) Sun Jingzu | (Hong Kong) No. 13 Audi Sport Asia Team Absolute | 15 | 9 | 13 | 8 | 9 | 20 | 6 | 12 | 9 | 26 | 16 | 14 | 18 |
| 26 | (Switzerland) Edoardo Mortara | (Hong Kong) No. 992 Absolute Racing | | | | | | | | | | | 5 | 7 | 16 |
| 27 | (Japan) Kei Cozzolino (Japan) Takeshi Kimura | (Japan) No. 1 Car Guy Racing | | | 12 | 9 | | | 7 | 24 | 6 | 16 | | | 16 |
| 28 | (Japan) Tomonobu Fujii (Japan) Satoshi Hoshino | (Japan) No. 47 D'station Racing | | | 17 | 7 | Ret | 6 | 13 | 9 | 15 | 14 | 13 | 17 | 16 |
| 29 | (Japan) Seiji Ara (Japan) Tomohide Yamaguchi | (Japan) No. 5 PLUS with BMW Team Studie | | | Ret | 5 | 12 | 10 | Ret | Ret | 23 | 8 | | | 15 |
| 30 | (Switzerland) Alexandre Imperatori | (Hong Kong) No. 992 Absolute Racing | 6 | Ret | Ret | 10 | 15 | 7 | | | | | | | 15 |
| 31 | (Chinese Taipei) Morris Chen (Portugal) Álvaro Parente | (Chinese Taipei) No. 72 HubAuto Racing | 21 | 8 | 20 | Ret | 11 | 13 | 12 | Ret | 12 | 7 | Ret | **8** | 14 |
| 32 | (Chinese Taipei) Chen Jun-san (Finland) Jesse Krohn | (Chinese Taipei) No. 90 GH-Team AAI (Chinese Taipei) No. 91 FIST - Team AAI | 25 | 4 | | | | | | | | | Ret | DNS | 12 |
| 33 | (China) Cao Qi (China) Ling Kang | (China) No. 29 Phantom Pro Racing | 22 | 5 | 18 | 29 | 25 | 26 | **9** | 17 | 14 | 18 | 19 | 22 | 12 |
| 34 | (Hong Kong) Paul Ip (Italy) Edoardo Liberati | (Hong Kong) No. 22 KCMG | | | 26 | 22 | 8 | 15 | 21 | 21 | 19 | 6 | | | 12 |
| 35 | (Chinese Taipei) Brian Lee (Japan) Hideto Yasuoka | (Chinese Taipei) No. 14 HubAuto Racing with GTO Racing | 17 | 10 | 22 | 14 | 17 | 16 | 14 | 14 | 7 | 17 | 10 | 21 | 9 |
| 36 | (Malaysia) Prince Jefri Ibrahim | (Australia) No. 888 Triple Eight JMR | 11 | 15 | 7 | 13 | 22 | 18 | 11 | 13 | 18 | 12 | 11 | 11 | 7 |
| 37 | (New Zealand) Richie Stanaway | (Australia) No. 888 Triple Eight JMR | | | 7 | 13 | | | | | 18 | 12 | | | 6 |
| 38 | (Thailand) Dechathorn Phuakkarawut (Thailand) Pasarit Promsombat | (Thailand) No. 114 YK Motorsports BBR by Sunoco | 23 | 7 | | | | | | | | | | | 6 |
| 39 | (Japan) Tsubasa Kondo (Japan) Kiyoshi Uchiyama | (Japan) No. 25 NK Racing | 13 | 16 | 8 | 30 | 21 | 19 | 23 | 20 | 11 | 20 | 12 | 23 | 4 |
| 40 | (Chinese Taipei) Kevin Chen (Germany) Jens Klingmann | (Chinese Taipei) No. 15 FIST - Team AAI (Chinese Taipei) No. 91 GH-Team AAI | 9 | 13 | | | | | | | | | 15 | 9 | 4 |
| 41 | (Australia) Broc Feeney | (Australia) No. 888 Triple Eight JMR | 11 | 15 | | | 22 | 18 | 11 | 11 | | | 11 | 11 | 1 |
| 42 | (Japan) Mineki Okura | (Japan) No. 19 The Spirit of FFF Racing | | | DNS | Ret | Ret | 33 | 15 | 10 | 20 | 21 | | | 1 |
| 42 | (Japan) Hiroshi Hamaguchi | (Japan) No. 19 The Spirit of FFF Racing | | | DNS | Ret | | | 15 | 10 | 20 | 21 | | | 1 |
| — | (Japan) Yorikatsu Tsujiko (Japan) Yusuke Yamasaki | (Japan) No. 7 Comet Racing | | | 24 | 11 | 28 | 25 | 18 | 18 | 24 | 24 | | | 0 |
| — | (Japan) Tadao Uematsu | (Japan) No. 55 Team Uematsu | | | 31 | 12 | | | 16 | 16 | | | | | 0 |
| — | (Netherlands) Henk Kiks (Sri Lanka) Eshan Pieris | (Thailand) No. 26 B-Quik Racing | 14 | Ret | | | | | | | | | | | 0 |
| — | (New Zealand) Earl Bamber (Malaysia) Adrian Henry D'Silva | (New Zealand) No. 8 EBM Giga Racing | | | | | | | | | 16 | 15 | | | 0 |
| — | (Japan) Kei Nakanishi (Japan) Shigekazu Wakisaka | (Japan) No. 60 LM Corsa | | | Ret | 19 | 24 | 20 | Ret | 15 | 21 | 28 | | | 0 |
| — | (China) Bian Ye (China) Hu Yuqi | (China) No. 3 Climax Racing | 18 | 18 | 16 | 21 | 16 | 28 | 17 | Ret | 17 | 22 | Ret | 27 | 0 |
| — | (Japan) Keita Sawa | (Japan) No. 16 ABSSA Motorsport | | | Ret | 17 | **23** | Ret | | | | | | | 0 |
| — | (Japan) Kiwamu Katayama | (Japan) No. 16 ABSSA Motorsport | | | Ret | 17 | | | | | | | | | 0 |
| — | (Australia) Andrew Macpherson (Australia) William Ben Porter | (Australia) No. 51 AMAC Motorsport | 19 | 22 | 23 | 18 | 26 | 23 | 22 | 25 | Ret | 25 | 18 | 24 | 0 |
| — | (Japan) Katsuaki Kubota (Japan) Atsushi Miyake | (Japan) No. 17 CREF Motor Sport | | | | | 18 | 21 | | | | | | | 0 |
| — | (Thailand) Tanart Sathienthirakul | (New Zealand) No. 8 EBM Giga Racing | | | | | | | | | | | 21 | 18 | 0 |
| — | (Japan) Hiroaki Hatano (Japan) Shinya Hosokawa | (Japan) No. 33 Team GMB | | | 19 | 24 | 27 | 24 | 20 | 22 | | | | | 0 |
| — | (Japan) Masaaki Nishikawa (Japan) Atsushi Tanaka | (Japan) No. 360 RunUp Sports | | | 28 | 20 | 29 | 29 | 25 | 26 | 25 | 27 | | | 0 |
| — | (Japan) Morio Nitta (Japan) Kazunori Suenaga | (Japan) No. 96 K-tunes Racing | | | 25 | 31 | Ret | DNS | | | 22 | 23 | | | 0 |
| — | (Japan) Masataka Inoue | (Japan) No. 17 CREF Motor Sport (Japan) No. 16 ABSSA Motorsport | | | Ret | DNS | **23** | Ret | 24 | 27 | | | | | 0 |
| — | (Japan) Yuko Suzuki | (Japan) No. 17 CREF Motor Sport | | | Ret | DNS | | | 24 | 27 | | | | | 0 |
| — | (Japan) Takuya Shirasaka | (Japan) No. 19 The Spirit of FFF Racing | | | | | Ret | 33 | | | | | | | 0 |
GT4
| 1 | (Japan) Masaki Kano (Japan) Manabu Orido | (Japan) No. 50 YZ Racing with Studie | | | **29** | **DSQ** | **30** | 30 | 26 | **28** | 6 | 1 | | | 162 |
| 2 | (Indonesia) Haridarma Manoppo (Japan) Seita Nonaka | No. 39 Toyota Gazoo Racing Indonesia | **24** | **20** | | | | | | | 1 | 2 | **24** | **29** | 143 |
| 3 | (Japan) Sho Kobayashi (Japan) Naohiko Otsuka | (Japan) No. 718 Checkshop Caymania Racing | | | 32 | 26 | 32 | 32 | **27** | 29 | 4 | 5 | | | 136 |
| 4 | (Japan) Masayoshi Oyama (Japan) Ryohei Sakaguchi | (Japan) No. 71 Akiland Racing | | | 30 | 27 | 31 | **Ret** | | | 2 | 4 | | | 87 |
| 5 | (Japan) Hiromitsu Fujii (Japan) Masanori Nogami | (Japan) No. 97 K-tunes Racing | | | 33 | 28 | | | | | | | | | 27 |
Guest drivers ineligible to score points
GT3
| — | (Malaysia) Akash Nandy (Sri Lanka) Eshan Pieris | (Thailand) No. 62 B-Quik Racing | | | | | | | | | | | 9 | 12 | — |
| — | (Hong Kong) Antares Au | (Hong Kong) No. 30 Modena Motorsport | | | | | | | | | | | 17 | 20 | — |
| — | (Malaysia) Adrian Henry D'Silva (New Zealand) Reid Harker | (New Zealand) No. 61 EBM Giga Racing | | | | | | | | | | | Ret | 19 | — |
| — | (Thailand) Henk Kiks (Thailand) Adisak Tangphuncharoen | (Thailand) No. 26 B-Quik Racing | | | | | | | | | | | 20 | 25 | — |
| — | (Australia) Ash Samadi | (Australia) No. 222 Melbourne Performance Centre | | | | | | | | | | | 22 | 28 | — |
| — | (China) Wu Ruihua (China) Xin Yanbi | (China) No. 99 Harmony Racing | | | | | | | | | | | 23 | 26 | — |
GT4
| — | (Japan) Kenji Hama (Japan) Tatsuya Hoshino | (Japan) No. 48 D'station Racing | | | | | | | | | 5 | 3 | | | — |
| — | (Japan) Masataka Inoue (Japan) Yuko Suzuki | (Japan) No. 27 CREF Motor Sport | | | | | | | | | 3 | Ret | | | — |
| — | (Japan) Kazuki Oki (Japan) Risa Oogushi | (Japan) No. 83 Comet Racing | | | | | | | | | 7 | 6 | | | — |
| Pos. | Driver | Team | BUR (Thailand) | | FUJ (Japan) | | SUZ (Japan) | | MOT (Japan) | | OKA (Japan) | | SEP (Malaysia) | | Points |

| Colour | Result |
|---|---|
| Gold | Winner |
| Silver | Second place |
| Bronze | Third place |
| Green | Points classification |
| Blue | Non-points classification |
| Blue | Non-classified finish (NC) |
| Purple | Retired, not classified (Ret) |
| Red | Did not qualify (DNQ) |
| Red | Did not pre-qualify (DNPQ) |
| Black | Disqualified (DSQ) |
| White | Did not start (DNS) |
| White | Withdrew (WD) |
| White | Race cancelled (C) |
| Blank | Did not practice (DNP) |
| Blank | Did not arrive (DNA) |
| Blank | Excluded (EX) |

**Bold** – Pole

Italics – Fastest Lap

Notes:

- † – Drivers did not finish the race, but were classified as they completed more than 90% of the race distance.

==== Silver Cup ====
| Pos. | Driver | Team | BUR (Thailand) | | FUJ (Japan) | | SUZ (Japan) | | MOT (Japan) | | OKA (Japan) | | SEP (Malaysia) | | Points |
GT3
| 1 | (China) Cao Qi (China) Ling Kang | (China) No. 29 Phantom Pro Racing | **2** | 1 | 1 | 2 | 3 | 2 | 1 | 2 | 1 | 1 | 3 | 3 | 248 |
| 2 | (China) Leo Ye Hongli (China) Yuan Bo | (China) No. 87 R&B Racing | 1 | 2 | **Ret** | **1** | 1 | **1** | 2 | **1** | Ret | DNS | 1 | 1 | 211 |
| 3 | (Japan) Keita Sawa (Japan) Masataka Inoue | (Japan) No. 16 ABSSA Motorsport | | | | | **2** | Ret | | | | | | | 18 |
Guest drivers ineligible to score points
| — | (Malaysia) Akash Nandy (Sri Lanka) Eshan Pieris | (Thailand) No. 62 B-Quik Racing | | | | | | | | | | | 2 | 2 | — |
| Pos. | Driver | Team | BUR (Thailand) | | FUJ (Japan) | | SUZ (Japan) | | MOT (Japan) | | OKA (Japan) | | SEP (Malaysia) | | Points |

==== Pro-Am Cup ====
| Pos. | Driver | Team | BUR (Thailand) | | FUJ (Japan) | | SUZ (Japan) | | MOT (Japan) | | OKA (Japan) | | SEP (Malaysia) | | Points |
GT3
| 1 | (China) Anthony Liu Xu | (Hong Kong) No. 37 Craft-Bamboo Racing | 9 | 1 | 5 | **Ret** | 17 | **1** | 3 | 5 | 1 | 4 | 2 | 9 | 144 |
| 2 | (Malaysia) Prince Abu Bakar Ibrahim | (Australia) No. 88 Triple Eight JMR | **1** | 10 | 14 | 1 | 18 | 2 | 4 | 3 | 4 | 23 | 3 | 2 | 141 |
| 3 | (China) Lu Wei | (China) No. 4 R&B Racing | 4 | 15 | 3 | 3 | 12 | 3 | Ret | 1 | 10 | 3 | 4 | 1 | 135 |
| 4 | (Thailand) Vutthikorn Inthraphuvasak | (Hong Kong) No. 911 AAS Motorsport by Absolute Racing | 2 | **3** | 2 | 17 | 1 | 8 | Ret | 6 | 2 | 2 | Ret | 5 | 134 |
| 5 | (Germany) Luca Stolz | (Australia) No. 88 Triple Eight JMR | **1** | 10 | 14 | 1 | 18 | 2 | 4 | 3 | | | | | 96 |
| 6 | (Indonesia) Andrew Haryanto (China) James Yu Kuai | (Hong Kong) 11 Audi Sport Asia Team Absolute | 7 | 14 | 9 | 5 | 4 | 7 | 1 | Ret | 5 | 18 | 1 | 11 | 96 |
| 7 | (Belgium) Alessio Picariello | (Hong Kong) No. 911 AAAS Motorsport by Absolute Racing | 2 | **3** | 2 | 17 | | | Ret | 6 | 2 | 2 | | | 95 |
| 8 | (Spain) Daniel Juncadella | (Hong Kong) No. 37 Craft-Bamboo Racing | | | 5 | **Ret** | 17 | **1** | | | 1 | 4 | 2 | 9 | 92 |
| 9 | (Japan) Yuta Kamimura (Japan) Hiroaki Nagai | (Japan) No. 18 Porsche Center Okazaki | 6 | 16 | 15 | 13 | 3 | 10 | 2 | 4 | 8 | 13 | 6 | 4 | 78 |
| 10 | (France) Patrick Pilet | (China) No. 4 R&B Racing | | | | | 12 | 3 | | | 10 | 3 | 4 | 1 | 68 |
| 11 | (Norway) Dennis Olsen | (China) No. 4 R&B Racing | 4 | 15 | 3 | 3 | | | Ret | 1 | | | | | 67 |
| 12 | (China) Bao Jinlong | (Hong Kong) No. 992 Absolute Racing | 5 | Ret | Ret | 9 | 14 | 6 | Ret | 2 | 23 | 5 | 5 | 6 | — |
| 13 | (Germany) Fabian Schiller | (Hong Kong) No. 37 Craft-Bamboo Racing | 9 | 1 | | | | | 3 | 5 | | | | | 52 |
| 14 | (Denmark) Dennis Lind (China) Zhou Bihuang | (China) No. 2 Climax Racing | 3 | Ret | 4 | 19 | 5 | 4 | 13 | 18 | Ret | 9 | Ret | 14 | 51 |
| 15 | (Thailand) Piti Bhirombhakdi (Japan) Naoki Yokomizo | (Japan) No. 555 Maezawa Racing | | | 10 | 12 | 6 | 11 | 5 | 9 | Ret | 1 | | | 46 |
| 16 | (Canada) Mikael Grenier | (Australia) No. 88 Triple Eight JMR | | | | | | | | | 4 | 23 | 3 | 2 | 45 |
| 17 | (China) Chris Chia On (Denmark) Mikkel Mac | (China) No. 333 Phantom Pro Racing | 17 | 5 | 6 | Ret | 9 | 16 | Ret | 14 | 13 | 24 | 7 | 3 | 41 |
| 18 | (Austria) Klaus Bachler | (Hong Kong) No. 911 Absolute - AAS Motorsport | | | | | 1 | 8 | | | | | Ret | 5 | 39 |
| 19 | (Japan) "Hirobon" (Japan) Shintaro Kawabata | (Japan) No. 500 Team 5ZIGEN | | | 23 | Ret | 2 | 24 | | | 3 | 11 | | | 33 |
| 20 | (Germany) Maximilian Götz (Chinese Taipei) Jeffrey Lee | (Hong Kong) No. 77 Craft-Bamboo Racing (Hong Kong) No. 85 Craft-Bamboo Racing | 15 | 2 | 19 | 22 | 13 | 13 | 8 | 7 | 22 | 10 | 12 | 13 | 29 |
| 21 | (Italy) Matteo Cairoli | (Hong Kong) No. 992 Absolute Racing | | | | | | | Ret | 2 | 23 | 5 | | | 28 |
| 22 | (China) Franky Cheng Congfu (China) Sun Jingzu | (Hong Kong) No. 13 Audi Sport Asia Team Absolute | 14 | 7 | 13 | 7 | 8 | 19 | 6 | 10 | 9 | 21 | 14 | 12 | 27 |
| 23 | (Japan) Akira Iida (Japan) Shinji Takei | (Japan) No. 9 Bingo Racing | | | 1 | Ret | | | | | | | | | 25 |
| 24 | (Japan) Tomonobu Fujii (Japan) Satoshi Hoshino | (Japan) No. 47 D'station Racing | | | 16 | 6 | Ret | 5 | 11 | 8 | 15 | 14 | 11 | 15 | 22 |
| 25 | (Chinese Taipei) Morris Chen (Portugal) Álvaro Parente | (Chinese Taipei) No. 72 HubAuto Racing | 18 | 6 | 18 | Ret | 10 | 12 | 10 | Ret | 12 | 7 | Ret | 7 | 22 |
| 26 | (Indonesia) Setiawan Santoso | (New Zealand) No. 8 EBM Giga Racing | 11 | 9 | 11 | 2 | Ret | 23 | | | | | 15 | 16 | 20 |
| 26 | (New Zealand) Reid Harker | (New Zealand) No. 8 EBM Giga Racing | 11 | 9 | 11 | 2 | Ret | 23 | | | | | | | 20 |
| 27 | (Switzerland) Alexandre Imperatori | (Hong Kong) No. 992 Absolute Racing | 5 | Ret | Ret | 9 | 14 | 6 | | | | | | | 20 |
| 28 | (Japan) Seiji Ara (Japan) Tomohide Yamaguchi | (Japan) No. 5 PLUS with BMW Team Studie | | | Ret | 4 | 11 | 9 | Ret | Ret | 21 | 8 | | | 18 |
| 29 | (Switzerland) Edoardo Mortara | (Hong Kong) No. 992 Absolute Racing | | | | | | | | | | | 5 | 6 | 18 |
| 30 | (Japan) Kei Cozzolino (Japan) Takeshi Kimura | (Japan) No. 1 Car Guy Racing | | | 12 | 8 | | | 7 | 19 | 6 | 16 | | | 18 |
| 31 | (Hong Kong) Paul Ip (Italy) Edoardo Liberati | (Hong Kong) No. 22 KCMG | | | 22 | 16 | 7 | 14 | 15 | 16 | 18 | 6 | | | 14 |
| 32 | (Chinese Taipei) Brian Lee (Japan) Hideto Yasuoka | (Chinese Taipei) No. 14 HubAuto Racing with GTO Racing | 16 | 8 | 20 | 11 | 15 | 15 | 12 | 12 | 7 | 17 | 8 | 18 | 14 |
| 33 | (Malaysia) Prince Jefri Ibrahim | (Australia) No. 888 Triple Eight JMR | 10 | 12 | 7 | 10 | 20 | 17 | 9 | 11 | 17 | 12 | 9 | 10 | 13 |
| 34 | (Chinese Taipei) Jun Sanchen (Finland) Jesse Krohn | (Chinese Taipei) No. 90 FIST - Team AAI (Chinese Taipei) No. 91 FIST - Team AAI | 18 | 4 | | | | | | | | | Ret | DNS | 12 |
| 35 | (Chinese Taipei) Kevin Chen (Germany) Jens Klingmann | (Chinese Taipei) No. 15 FIST - Team AAI | 8 | 11 | | | | | | | | | 13 | 8 | 4 |
| 36 | (New Zealand) Richie Stanaway | (Australia) No. 888 Triple Eight JMR | | | 7 | 10 | | | | | 17 | 12 | | | 7 |
| 37 | (Australia) Broc Feeney | (Australia) No. 888 Triple Eight JMR | 10 | 12 | | | 20 | 17 | 9 | 11 | | | 9 | 10 | 6 |
| 38 | (Japan) Tsubasa Kondo (Japan) Kiyoshi Uchiyama | (Japan) No. 25 NK Racing | 12 | 13 | 8 | 20 | 19 | 18 | 16 | 15 | 11 | 19 | 10 | 19 | 5 |
| — | (Japan) Kei Nakanishi (Japan) Shigekazu Wakisaka | (Japan) No. 60 LM Corsa | | | Ret | 15 | 22 | 21 | Ret | 13 | 19 | 22 | | | 0 |
| — | (Netherlands) Henk Kiks (Sri Lanka) Eshan Pieris | (Thailand) No. 26 B-Quik Racing | 13 | Ret | | | | | | | | | | | 0 |
| — | (Japan) Hiroaki Hatano (Japan) Shinya Hosokawa | (Japan) No. 33 Team GMB | | | 17 | 18 | 23 | 22 | 14 | 17 | | | | | 0 |
| — | (Japan) Keita Sawa | (Japan) No. 16 ABSSA Motorsport | | | Ret | 14 | **21** | Ret | | | | | | | 0 |
| — | (Japan) Kiwamu Katayama | (Japan) No. 16 ABSSA Motorsport | | | Ret | 14 | | | | | | | | | 0 |
| — | (New Zealand) Earl Bamber (Malaysia) Adrian Henry D'Silva | (New Zealand) No. 8 EBM Giga Racing | | | | | | | | | 16 | 15 | | | — |
| — | (Thailand) Tanart Sathienthirakul | (New Zealand) No. 8 EBM Giga Racing | | | | | | | | | | | 15 | 16 | 0 |
| — | (Japan) Katsuaki Kubota (Japan) Atsushi Miyake | (Japan) No. 17 CREF Motor Sport | | | | | 16 | 20 | | | | | | | 0 |
| — | (Japan) Masataka Inoue | (Japan) No. 17 CREF Motor Sport (Japan) No. 16 ABSSA Motorsport | | | Ret | DNS | **21** | Ret | 17 | 20 | | | | | 0 |
| — | (Japan) Yuko Suzuki | (Japan) No. 17 CREF Motor Sport | | | Ret | DNS | | | 17 | 20 | | | | | 0 |
| — | (Japan) Morio Nitta (Japan) Kazunori Suenaga | (Japan) No. 96 K-tunes Racing | | | 21 | 21 | Ret | DNS | | | 20 | 20 | | | 0 |
Guest drivers ineligible to score points
| — | (Malaysia) Adrian Henry D'Silva (New Zealand) Reid Harker | (New Zealand) No. 61 EBM Giga Racing | | | | | | | | | | | Ret | 17 | — |
| Pos. | Driver | Team | BUR (Thailand) | | FUJ (Japan) | | SUZ (Japan) | | MOT (Japan) | | OKA (Japan) | | SEP (Malaysia) | | Points |

==== Silver-Am Cup ====
| Pos. | Driver | Team | BUR (Thailand) | | FUJ (Japan) | | SUZ (Japan) | | MOT (Japan) | | OKA (Japan) | | SEP (Malaysia) | | Points |
GT4
| 1 | (Japan) Masaki Kano (Japan) Manabu Orido | (Japan) No. 50 YZ Racing with Studie | | | **1** | **DSQ** | **1** | 1 | **1** | **1** | 4 | 1 | | | 165 |
| 2 | (Indonesia) Haridarma Manoppo (Japan) Seita Nonaka | No. 39 Toyota Gazoo Racing Indonesia | **1** | **1** | | | | | | | 1 | 2 | **1** | **1** | 133 |
| 3 | (Japan) Masayoshi Oyama (Japan) Ryohei Sakaguchi | (Japan) No. 71 Akiland Racing | | | 2 | 1 | 2 | **Ret** | | | 2 | 3 | | | 94 |
Guest drivers ineligible to score points
| — | (Japan) Masataka Inoue (Japan) Yuko Suzuki | (Japan) No. 27 CREF Motor Sport | | | | | | | | | 3 | Ret | | | — |
| — | (Japan) Kazuki Oki (Japan) Risa Oogushi | (Japan) No. 83 Comet Racing | | | | | | | | | 5 | 4 | | | — |
| Pos. | Driver | Team | BUR (Thailand) | | FUJ (Japan) | | SUZ (Japan) | | MOT (Japan) | | OKA (Japan) | | SEP (Malaysia) | | Points |

==== Am Cup ====
| Pos. | Driver | Team | BUR (Thailand) | | FUJ (Japan) | | SUZ (Japan) | | MOT (Japan) | | OKA (Japan) | | SEP (Malaysia) | | Points |
GT3
| 1 | (China) Bian Ye (China) Hu Yuqi | (China) No. 3 Climax Racing | 1 | 2 | 1 | 5 | **1** | 3 | 3 | Ret | 1 | 2 | 6 | 5 | 194 |
| 2 | (Australia) Andrew Macpherson (Australia) William Ben Porter | (Australia) No. 51 AMAC Motorsport | 2 | **3** | 2 | 3 | 2 | **1** | 5 | 4 | Ret | 4 | 2 | 2 | 179 |
| 3 | (Japan) Yorikatsu Tsujiko (Japan) Yusuke Yamasaki | (Japan) No. 7 Comet Racing | | | 3 | 1 | 3 | 2 | 4 | 3 | 3 | 3 | | | 130 |
| 4 | (Japan) Mineki Okura | (Japan) No. 19 The Spirit of FFF Racing | | | **DNS** | **Ret** | Ret | 5 | 1 | 1 | 2 | 1 | | | 103 |
| 5 | (Japan) Hiroshi Hamaguchi | (Japan) No. 19 The Spirit of FFF Racing | | | **DNS** | **Ret** | | | 1 | 1 | 2 | 1 | | | 93 |
| 6 | (Japan) Masaaki Nishikawa (Japan) Atsushi Tanaka | (Japan) No. 360 RunUp Sports | | | 4 | 4 | 4 | 4 | 6 | 5 | 4 | 5 | | | 88 |
| 7 | (Japan) Tadao Uematsu | (Japan) No. 55 Team Uematsu | | | 5 | 2 | | | 2 | 2 | | | | | 64 |
| 8 | (Thailand) Dechathorn Phuakkarawut (Thailand) Pasarit Promsombat | (Thailand) No. 114 YK Motorsports BBR by Sunoco | **3** | 1 | | | | | | | | | | | 40 |
| 9 | (Japan) Takuya Shirasaka | (Japan) No. 19 The Spirit of FFF Racing | | | | | Ret | 5 | | | | | | | 10 |
GT4
| 1 | (Japan) Sho Kobayashi (Japan) Naohiko Otsuka | (Japan) No. 718 Checkshop Caymania Racing | | | **6** | **6** | **5** | **6** | **7** | **6** | 1 | 2 | | | 200 |
| 2 | (Japan) Hiromitsu Fujii (Japan) Masanori Nogami | (Japan) No. 97 K-tunes Racing | | | 7 | 7 | | | | | | | | | 36 |
Guest drivers ineligible to score points
GT3
| — | (Hong Kong) Antares Au | (Hong Kong) No. 30 Modena Motorsport | | | | | | | | | | | 1 | 1 | — |
| — | (Netherlands) Henk Kiks (Thailand) Adisak Tangphuncharoen | (Thailand) No. 26 B-Quik Racing | | | | | | | | | | | 3 | 3 | — |
| — | (China) Wu Ruihua (China) Xin Yanbi | (China) No. 99 Harmony Racing | | | | | | | | | | | 5 | 4 | — |
| — | (Australia) Ash Samadi | (Australia) No. 222 Melbourne Performance Centre | | | | | | | | | | | 4 | 6 | — |
GT4
| — | (Japan) Kenji Hama (Japan) Tatsuya Hoshino | (Japan) No. 48 D'station Racing | | | | | | | | | 2 | 1 | | | — |
| Pos. | Driver | Team | BUR (Thailand) | | FUJ (Japan) | | SUZ (Japan) | | MOT (Japan) | | OKA (Japan) | | SEP (Malaysia) | | Points |

==== China Cup ====
| Pos. | Driver | Team | BUR (Thailand) | | FUJ (Japan) | | SUZ (Japan) | | MOT (Japan) | | OKA (Japan) | | SEP (Malaysia) | | Points |
GT3
| 1 | (China) Franky Cheng Congfu (China) Sun Jingzu | (China) No. 29 Phantom Pro Racing | 2 | 2 | 1 | 2 | 2 | 2 | 1 | 2 | 1 | 3 | 2 | 2 | 234 |
| 2 | (China) Leo Ye Hongli (China) Yuan Bo | (China) No. 87 R&B Racing | 1 | 3 | Ret | 1 | 1 | 1 | 3 | 1 | Ret | DNS | 1 | 1 | 205 |
| 3 | (China) Cao Qi (China) Ling Kang | (China) No. 29 Phantom Pro Racing | 4 | 1 | 3 | 4 | 4 | 3 | 2 | 3 | 2 | 1 | 3 | 3 | 197 |
| 4 | (China) Bian Ye (China) Hu Yuqi | (China) No. 87 R&B Racing | 3 | 4 | 2 | 3 | 3 | 4 | 4 | Ret | 3 | 2 | 4 | 4 | 156 |
| Pos. | Driver | Team | BUR (Thailand) | | FUJ (Japan) | | SUZ (Japan) | | MOT (Japan) | | OKA (Japan) | | SEP (Malaysia) | | Points |

=== Teams' Championship ===
| Pos. | Team | BUR (Thailand) | | FUJ (Japan) | | SUZ (Japan) | | MOT (Japan) | | OKA (Japan) | | SEP (Malaysia) | | Points |
GT3
| 1 | (China) R&B Racing | 3 | 14 | 3 | 3 | 7 | 3 | 10 | 1 | 10 | 3 | 4 | 1 | 207 |
| 1 | (China) R&B Racing | 5 | 19 | Ret | 4 | 13 | 5 | Ret | 8 | Ret | DNS | 6 | 2 | 207 |
| 2 | (Thailand) AAS Motorsport by Absolute Racing (Hong Kong) Absolute Racing | 2 | 3 | 2 | 10 | 1 | 7 | Ret | 2 | 2 | 2 | 5 | 6 | 189 |
| 2 | (Thailand) AAS Motorsport by Absolute Racing (Hong Kong) Absolute Racing | 6 | Ret | Ret | 23 | 15 | 9 | Ret | 6 | 27 | 5 | Ret | 7 | 189 |
| 3 | (Hong Kong) Craft-Bamboo Racing | 10 | 1 | 5 | 32 | 14 | 1 | 3 | 5 | 1 | 4 | 2 | 10 | 171 |
| 3 | (Hong Kong) Craft-Bamboo Racing | 16 | 2 | 21 | Ret | 19 | 14 | 8 | 7 | 26 | 10 | 14 | 15 | 171 |
| 4 | (Malaysia) Triple Eight JMR | 1 | 12 | 7 | 1 | 20 | 2 | 4 | 3 | 4 | 12 | 3 | 3 | 144 |
| 4 | (Malaysia) Triple Eight JMR | 11 | 15 | 14 | 13 | 22 | 18 | 11 | 13 | 18 | 29 | 11 | 11 | 144 |
| 5 | (Hong Kong) Audi Sport Asia Team Absolute | 8 | 9 | 9 | 6 | 4 | 8 | 1 | 6 | 5 | 9 | 1 | 13 | 108 |
| 5 | (Hong Kong) Audi Sport Asia Team Absolute | 15 | 17 | 13 | 8 | 9 | 20 | Ret | 12 | 19 | 26 | 16 | 14 | 108 |
| 6 | (Japan) Porsche Center Okazaki | 7 | 21 | 15 | 16 | 3 | 11 | 2 | 4 | 8 | 13 | 7 | 5 | 71 |
| 7 | (China) Climax Racing | 4 | 18 | 4 | 21 | 5 | 4 | 19 | 23 | 17 | 9 | Ret | 16 | 48 |
| 7 | (China) Climax Racing | 18 | Ret | 16 | 25 | 16 | 28 | 17 | Ret | Ret | 22 | Ret | 27 | 48 |
| 8 | (China) Phantom Pro Racing | 20 | 5 | 6 | Ret | 10 | 17 | 9 | 19 | 13 | 30 | 8 | 4 | 45 |
| 8 | (China) Phantom Pro Racing | 22 | 6 | 18 | 29 | 25 | 26 | Ret | 17 | 14 | 18 | 19 | 22 | 45 |
| 9 | (Japan) Maezawa Racing | | | 10 | 15 | 6 | 12 | 5 | 11 | Ret | 1 | | | 44 |
| 10 | (Japan) Team 5ZIGEN | | | 27 | Ret | 2 | 31 | | | 3 | 11 | | | 33 |
| 11 | (Japan) Bingo Racing | | | 1 | Ret | | | | | | | | | 25 |
| 12 | (Chinese Taipei) HubAuto Racing HubAuto Racing with GTO Racing | 17 | 8 | 20 | 14 | 11 | 13 | 12 | 14 | 7 | 7 | 10 | 8 | 23 |
| 12 | (Chinese Taipei) HubAuto Racing HubAuto Racing with GTO Racing | 21 | 10 | 22 | Ret | 17 | 16 | 14 | Ret | 12 | 17 | Ret | 21 | 23 |
| 13 | (New Zealand) EBM Giga Racing | 12 | 11 | 11 | 2 | Ret | 27 | | | 16 | 15 | 21 | 18 | 18 |
| 14 | (Chinese Taipei) GH-Team AAI FIST - Team AAI | 9 | 4 | | | | | | | | | 15 | 9 | 16 |
| 14 | (Chinese Taipei) GH-Team AAI FIST - Team AAI | 25 | 13 | | | | | | | | | Ret | DNS | 16 |
| 15 | (Japan) Car Guy Racing | | | 12 | 9 | | | 7 | 24 | 6 | 16 | | | 16 |
| 16 | (Japan) D'station Racing | | | 17 | 7 | Ret | 6 | 13 | 9 | 15 | 14 | 13 | 17 | 16 |
| 17 | (Japan) PLUS with BMW Team Studie | | | Ret | 5 | 12 | 10 | Ret | Ret | 23 | 8 | | | 15 |
| 18 | (Hong Kong) KCMG | | | 26 | 22 | 8 | 15 | 21 | 21 | 19 | 6 | | | 12 |
| 19 | (Thailand) YK Motorsports BBR by Sunoco | 23 | 7 | | | | | | | | | | | 6 |
| 20 | (Japan) NK Racing | 13 | 16 | 8 | 30 | 21 | 19 | 23 | 20 | 11 | 20 | 12 | 23 | 4 |
| 21 | (Japan) The Spirit of FFF Racing | | | DNS | Ret | Ret | 33 | 15 | 10 | 20 | 21 | | | 1 |
| — | (Japan) Comet Racing | | | 24 | 11 | 28 | 25 | 18 | 18 | 24 | 24 | | | 0 |
| — | (Japan) Team Uematsu | | | 31 | 12 | | | 16 | 16 | | | | | 0 |
| — | (Thailand) B-Quik Racing | 14 | Ret | | | | | | | | | | | 0 |
| — | (Japan) LM Corsa | | | Ret | 19 | 24 | 20 | Ret | 15 | 21 | 28 | | | 0 |
| — | (Japan) ABSSA Motorsport | | | Ret | 17 | **23** | Ret | | | | | | | 0 |
| — | (Australia) AMAC Motorsport | 19 | 22 | 23 | 18 | 26 | 23 | 22 | 25 | Ret | 25 | 18 | 24 | 0 |
| — | (Japan) CREF Motor Sport | | | Ret | DNS | 18 | 21 | 24 | 27 | | | | | 0 |
| — | (Japan) Team GMB | | | 19 | 24 | 27 | 24 | 20 | 22 | | | | | 0 |
| — | (Japan) RunUp Sports | | | 28 | 20 | 29 | 29 | 25 | 26 | 25 | 27 | | | 0 |
| — | (Japan) K-tunes Racing | | | 25 | 31 | Ret | DNS | | | 22 | 23 | | | 0 |
GT4
| 1 | (Japan) YZ Racing with Studie | | | **29** | **DSQ** | **30** | 30 | 26 | **28** | 6 | 1 | | | 162 |
| 2 | Toyota Gazoo Racing Indonesia | **24** | **20** | | | | | | | 1 | 2 | **24** | **29** | 143 |
| 3 | (Japan) Checkshop Caymania Racing | | | 32 | 26 | 32 | 32 | **27** | 29 | 4 | 5 | | | 136 |
| 4 | (Japan) Akiland Racing | | | 30 | 27 | 31 | **Ret** | | | 2 | 4 | | | 87 |
| 5 | (Japan) K-tunes Racing | | | 33 | 28 | | | | | | | | | 27 |
Guest drivers ineligible to score points
GT3
| — | (Malaysia) B-Quik Racing | | | | | | | | | | | 9 | 12 | — |
| — | (Malaysia) B-Quik Racing | | | | | | | | | | | 20 | 25 | — |
| — | (Hong Kong) Modena Motorsport | | | | | | | | | | | 17 | 20 | — |
| — | (New Zealand) EBM Giga Racing | | | | | | | | | | | Ret | 19 | — |
| — | (Australia) Melbourne Performance Centre | | | | | | | | | | | 22 | 28 | — |
| — | (China) Harmony Racing | | | | | | | | | | | 23 | 26 | — |
GT4
| — | (Japan) D'station Racing | | | | | | | | | 5 | 3 | | | — |
| — | (Japan) CREF Motor Sport | | | | | | | | | 3 | Ret | | | — |
| — | (Japan) Comet Racing | | | | | | | | | 7 | 6 | | | — |
| Pos. | Team | BUR (Thailand) | | FUJ (Japan) | | SUZ (Japan) | | MOT (Japan) | | OKA (Japan) | | SEP (Malaysia) | | Points |

== See also ==
- 2023 British GT Championship
- 2023 GT World Challenge Europe
- 2023 GT World Challenge Europe Endurance Cup
- 2023 GT World Challenge Europe Sprint Cup
- 2023 GT World Challenge America
- 2023 GT World Challenge Australia
- 2023 Intercontinental GT Challenge
