= 2015 GT Asia Series =

Seasons
- ← 2014 2016 →

The 2015 GT Asia Series was the sixth season of the GT Asia Series championship. It began on 16 May at the Korea International Circuit and ended on 2 November at the Guia Circuit after 11 championship races and a non-championship event.

The series will change tyre supplier from Yokohama to Michelin.

== Entry list ==
Team	Car	No.	Drivers	Class	Rounds
(Singapore) Clearwater Racing	Ferrari 458 Italia GT3	1	(Singapore) Weng Sun Mok	GT3	1–9
(Singapore) Clearwater Racing	Ferrari 458 Italia GT3	1	(United Kingdom) James Calado	GT3	1–2, 7
(Singapore) Clearwater Racing	Ferrari 458 Italia GT3	1	(Italy) Gianmaria Bruni	GT3	3–4
(Singapore) Clearwater Racing	Ferrari 458 Italia GT3	1	(Finland) Toni Vilander	GT3	5–6
(Singapore) Clearwater Racing	Ferrari 458 Italia GT3	1	(Italy) Alessandro Pier Guidi	GT3	8–9
(Singapore) Clearwater Racing	Ferrari 458 Italia GT3	12	(Singapore) Richard Wee	GT3	1–9
(Singapore) Clearwater Racing	Ferrari 458 Italia GT3	12	(New Zealand) Craig Baird	GT3	1–2
(Singapore) Clearwater Racing	Ferrari 458 Italia GT3	12	(Republic of Ireland) Matt Griffin	GT3	3–6, 8–9
(Singapore) Clearwater Racing	Ferrari 458 Italia GT3	12	(Japan) Hiroki Katoh	GT3	7
(China) FFF Racing Team by ACM	Nissan GT-R GT3	5	(Portugal) André Couto	GT3	5–6
(China) FFF Racing Team by ACM	Nissan GT-R GT3	5	(China) Fu Songyang	GT3	5–6
(China) FFF Racing Team by ACM	McLaren 650S GT3	5	(Italy) Andrea Caldarelli	GT3	1–4, 7
(China) FFF Racing Team by ACM	McLaren 650S GT3	5	(China) Fu Songyang	GT3	1–4, 8–9
(China) FFF Racing Team by ACM	McLaren 650S GT3	5	(Hong Kong) Ronald Wu	GT3	7
(China) FFF Racing Team by ACM	McLaren 650S GT3	5	(Italy) Vitantonio Liuzzi	GT3	8–9
(China) FFF Racing Team by ACM	McLaren 650S GT3	9	(Italy) Max Wiser	GT3	1–4
(China) FFF Racing Team by ACM	McLaren 650S GT3	9	(China) Jiang Xin	GT3	1–4
(China) FFF Racing Team by ACM	McLaren 650S GT3	15	(Australia) Nathan Antunes	GT3	5–9
(China) FFF Racing Team by ACM	McLaren 650S GT3	15	(Australia) Rod Salmon	GT3	5–9
(China) FFF Racing Team by ACM	McLaren 650S GT3	55	(Japan) Hiroshi Hamaguchi	GT3	1–9
(China) FFF Racing Team by ACM	McLaren 650S GT3	55	(Italy) Vitantonio Liuzzi	GT3	1–7
(China) FFF Racing Team by ACM	McLaren 650S GT3	55	(Portugal) Álvaro Parente	GT3	8–9
(Hong Kong) Bentley Team Absolute	Bentley Continental GT3	7	(Chinese Taipei) Jeffrey Lee	GT3	1–9
(Hong Kong) Bentley Team Absolute	Bentley Continental GT3	7	(France) Jean-Karl Vernay	GT3	1–2
(Hong Kong) Bentley Team Absolute	Bentley Continental GT3	7	(Spain) Andy Soucek	GT3	3–6
(Hong Kong) Bentley Team Absolute	Bentley Continental GT3	7	(United Kingdom) Andy Meyrick	GT3	7–9
(Hong Kong) Bentley Team Absolute	Bentley Continental GT3	8	(Hong Kong) Adderly Fong	GT3	1–9
(Hong Kong) Bentley Team Absolute	Bentley Continental GT3	8	(Japan) Keita Sawa	GT3	1–9
(Hong Kong) Bentley Team Absolute	Bentley Continental GT3	77	(United Kingdom) Duncan Tappy	GT3	1–9
(Hong Kong) Bentley Team Absolute	Bentley Continental GT3	77	(Hong Kong) Jacky Yeung	GT3	1–7
(Hong Kong) Bentley Team Absolute	Bentley Continental GT3	77	(South Korea) Andrew Kim	GT3	8–9
(Switzerland) Spirit of Race	Ferrari 458 Italia GT3	9	(Italy) Max Wiser	GT3	5–6
(Switzerland) Spirit of Race	Ferrari 458 Italia GT3	9	(China) Jiang Xin	GT3	5–6
(China) NB Team	Ferrari 458 Italia GT3	9	(Italy) Max Wiser	GT3	8–9
(China) NB Team	Ferrari 458 Italia GT3	9	(China) Jiang Xin	GT3	8–9
(Thailand) Singha Motorsport	Ferrari 458 Italia GT3	11	(Thailand) Piti Bhirombhakdi	GT3	1–9
(Thailand) Singha Motorsport	Ferrari 458 Italia GT3	11	(Japan) Naoki Yokomizo	GT3	1–2
(Thailand) Singha Motorsport	Ferrari 458 Italia GT3	11	(Netherlands) Carlo van Dam	GT3	3–9
(Japan) Gulf Racing JP	Porsche 991 GT3 Cup	20	(Japan) Hisashi Kunie	GTM	1–2, 5–9
(Japan) Gulf Racing JP	Porsche 991 GT3 Cup	20	(Japan) Keiichi Mori	GTM	1–2
(Japan) Gulf Racing JP	Porsche 991 GT3 Cup	20	(Japan) Tetsuya Makino	GTM	3–4
(Japan) Gulf Racing JP	Porsche 991 GT3 Cup	20	(Japan) Kimihiro Yashiro	GTM	3–6
(Japan) Gulf Racing JP	Porsche 991 GT3 Cup	20	(Belgium) Dylan Derdaele	GTM	7–9
(Japan) Gulf Racing JP	Porsche 997 GT3-R	22	(Japan) Shouta Hanaoka	GT3	1–2
(Japan) Gulf Racing JP	Porsche 997 GT3-R	22	(Japan) Kimihiro Yashiro	GT3	1–2, 8–9
(Japan) Gulf Racing JP	Porsche 997 GT3-R	22	(Belgium) Dylan Derdaele	GT3	3–4
(Japan) Gulf Racing JP	Porsche 997 GT3-R	22	(Japan) Hisashi Kunie	GT3	3–4
(Japan) Gulf Racing JP	Porsche 997 GT3-R	22	(Japan) Keiichi Mori	GT3	5–7
(Japan) Gulf Racing JP	Porsche 997 GT3-R	22	(Japan) Yutaka Yamamoto	GT3	5–6
(Japan) Gulf Racing JP	Porsche 997 GT3-R	22	(Japan) Tetsuya Makino	GT3	7
(Japan) Gulf Racing JP	Porsche 997 GT3-R	22	(Japan) Takashi Hagino	GT3	8–9
(Hong Kong) Absolute Racing	Audi R8 LMS Cup	23	(Hong Kong) Jerry Wang	GTM	1–9
(Hong Kong) Absolute Racing	Audi R8 LMS Cup	23	(Australia) Warren Luff	GTM	7
(Hong Kong) Absolute Racing	Audi R8 LMS ultra	98	(Hong Kong) Philip Ma	GT3	5–6, 8–9
(Hong Kong) Absolute Racing	Audi R8 LMS ultra	98	(China) Ho-Pin Tung	GT3	5–6, 8–9
(Sri Lanka) Dilango Racing	Lamborghini Gallardo FL2	24	(Sri Lanka) Dilantha Malagamuwa	GT3	3–6
(Sri Lanka) Dilango Racing	Lamborghini Gallardo FL2	24	(Japan) Kota Sasaki	GT3	3–6
(Sri Lanka) Dilango Racing	Lamborghini Gallardo LP560 GT3	34	(Japan) Takuma Aoki	GTM	3–7
(Sri Lanka) Dilango Racing	Lamborghini Gallardo LP560 GT3	34	(Japan) Ken Urata	GTM	3–7
(Malaysia) Nexus Infinity	Ferrari 458 Italia GT3	27	(Malaysia) Dominic Ang	GT3	7
(Malaysia) Nexus Infinity	Ferrari 458 Italia GT3	27	(Malaysia) Adrian D'Silva	GT3	7
(Japan) Bingo Racing	McLaren MP4-12C GT3	32	(Japan) Akira Iida	GT3	5–6
(Japan) Bingo Racing	McLaren MP4-12C GT3	32	(Japan) Taiyo Iida	GT3	5–6
(China) BBT	Ferrari 458 Italia GT3	37	(China) Anthony Liu	GT3	1–4, 7–9
(China) BBT	Ferrari 458 Italia GT3	37	(Italy) Davide Rizzo	GT3	1–4, 7–9
(Italy) GDL Racing	Porsche 997 GT3 Cup S	67	(Malaysia) Keong Liam Lim	GTM	7
(Italy) GDL Racing	Porsche 997 GT3 Cup S	67	(Hong Kong) Nigel Farmer	GTM	7
(Italy) GDL Racing	Porsche 991 GT3 Cup	87	(Malaysia) Keong Wee Lim	GTM	7
(Italy) GDL Racing	Porsche 991 GT3 Cup	87	(Malaysia) Melvin Moh	GTM	7
(Hong Kong) LKM Racing	Porsche 997 GT3-R	68	(Hong Kong) Yuk Lung Siu	GT3	7–9
(Hong Kong) LKM Racing	Porsche 997 GT3-R	68	(Hong Kong) Mak Hing Tak	GT3	7–9
(Hong Kong) Golden CMT RT	Ferrari 458 Challenge	69	(Hong Kong) James Cai	GTM	8–9
(Hong Kong) Golden CMT RT	Ferrari 458 Challenge	69	(Hong Kong) Kenneth Lim	GTM	8–9
Taiwan Top Speed Racing Team	Ferrari 458 Challenge	69	(Hong Kong) James Cai	GTM	5–6
Taiwan Top Speed Racing Team	Ferrari 458 Challenge	69	(Hong Kong) Kenneth Lim	GTM	5–6
Taiwan Top Speed Racing Team	Ferrari 458 Challenge	70	(Japan) Ryō Fukuda	GTM	5–6
Taiwan Top Speed Racing Team	Ferrari 458 Challenge	70	(Taiwan) Craig Liu	GTM	5–6
Taiwan Top Speed Racing Team	Ferrari 458 Challenge	78	(Taiwan) George Chou	GTM	5–7
Taiwan Top Speed Racing Team	Ferrari 458 Challenge	78	(Taiwan) Jeff Lu	GTM	5–6
Taiwan Top Speed Racing Team	Ferrari 458 Challenge	78	(Taiwan) Robert Lee	GTM	7
Taiwan Top Speed Racing Team	Ferrari 458 Challenge	95	(Taiwan) K.S. Wang	GTM	5–7
Taiwan Top Speed Racing Team	Ferrari 458 Challenge	95	(Japan) Shogo Mitsuyama	GTM	5–6
Taiwan Top Speed Racing Team	Ferrari 458 Challenge	95	(Taiwan) Craig Liu	GTM	7
(New Zealand) Team NZ	Porsche 997 GT3 Cup	71	(New Zealand) Graeme Dowsett	GTM	7
(New Zealand) Team NZ	Porsche 997 GT3 Cup	71	(New Zealand) John Curran	GTM	7
(Malaysia) OD Racing	Lamborghini Gallardo FL2	86	(Malaysia) Fairuz Fauzy	GT3	1–9
(Malaysia) OD Racing	Lamborghini Gallardo FL2	86	(Malaysia) Zen Low	GT3	1–9
(Hong Kong) Craft-Bamboo Racing	Aston Martin V12 Vantage GT3	88	(United Kingdom) Richard Lyons	GT3	1–9
(Hong Kong) Craft-Bamboo Racing	Aston Martin V12 Vantage GT3	88	(Hong Kong) Frank Yu	GT3	1–9
(Hong Kong) Craft-Bamboo Racing	Aston Martin V12 Vantage GT3	99	(Hong Kong) Darryl O'Young	GT3	1–9
(Hong Kong) Craft-Bamboo Racing	Aston Martin V12 Vantage GT3	99	(Australia) Jonathan Venter	GT3	1–6
(Hong Kong) Craft-Bamboo Racing	Aston Martin V12 Vantage GT3	99	(United Kingdom) Daniel Lloyd	GT3	7–9

Icon	Class
GT3	GT3
GTM	GTM

== Race calendar and results ==
The full calendar for the 2015 season was released on 28 February 2015. The Sepang International Circuit round will be a 3-hour endurance race and held at Saturday.

Round	Circuit	Date	Pole position	GT3 Winner	GTM Winner
1	(South Korea) Korea International Circuit	16 May	(Hong Kong) No. 88 Craft-Bamboo Racing	(China) No. 37 BBT Racing	(Hong Kong) No. 23 Absolute Racing
1	(South Korea) Korea International Circuit	16 May	(United Kingdom) Richard Lyons (Hong Kong) Frank Yu	(China) Anthony Liu (Italy) Davide Rizzo	(Hong Kong) Jerry Wang
2	(South Korea) Korea International Circuit	17 May	(Hong Kong) No. 99 Craft-Bamboo Racing	(Hong Kong) No. 99 Craft-Bamboo Racing	(Hong Kong) No. 23 Absolute Racing
2	(South Korea) Korea International Circuit	17 May	(Hong Kong) Darryl O'Young (Australia) Jonathan Venter	(Hong Kong) Darryl O'Young (Australia) Jonathan Venter	(Hong Kong) Jerry Wang
3	(Japan) Okayama International Circuit	27 June	(Hong Kong) No. 7 Bentley Team Absolute	(China) No. 55 FFF Racing Team by ACM	(Sri Lanka) No. 34 Dilango Racing
3	(Japan) Okayama International Circuit	27 June	(Taiwan) Jeffrey Lee (Spain) Andy Soucek	(Japan) Hiroshi Hamaguchi (Italy) Vitantonio Liuzzi	(Japan) Takuma Aoki (Japan) Ken Urata
4	(Japan) Okayama International Circuit	28 June	(Hong Kong) No. 8 Bentley Team Absolute	(Hong Kong) No. 8 Bentley Team Absolute	(Japan) No. 20 Gulf Racing JP
4	(Japan) Okayama International Circuit	28 June	(Hong Kong) Adderly Fong (Japan) Keita Sawa	(Hong Kong) Adderly Fong (Japan) Keita Sawa	(Japan) Tetsuya Makino (Japan) Kimihiro Yashiro
5	(Japan) Fuji Speedway	18 July	(Singapore) No. 1 Clearwater Racing	(Thailand) No. 11 Singha Motorsport	(Sri Lanka) No. 34 Dilango Racing
5	(Japan) Fuji Speedway	18 July	(Singapore) Weng Sun Mok (Finland) Toni Vilander	(Thailand) Piti Bhirombhakdi (Netherlands) Carlo van Dam	(Japan) Takuma Aoki (Japan) Ken Urata
6	(Japan) Fuji Speedway	19 July	(Hong Kong) No. 99 Craft-Bamboo Racing	(Hong Kong) No. 8 Bentley Team Absolute	No. 70 Taiwan Top Speed Racing Team
6	(Japan) Fuji Speedway	19 July	(Hong Kong) Darryl O'Young (Australia) Jonathan Venter	(Hong Kong) Adderly Fong (Japan) Keita Sawa	(Japan) Ryō Fukuda (Taiwan) Craig Liu
7	(Malaysia) Sepang International Circuit	5 September	(Hong Kong) No. 99 Craft-Bamboo Racing	(China) No. 37 BBT Racing	(Hong Kong) No. 23 Absolute Racing
7	(Malaysia) Sepang International Circuit	5 September	(Hong Kong) Darryl O'Young (United Kingdom) Daniel Lloyd	(China) Anthony Liu (Italy) Davide Rizzo	(Hong Kong) Jerry Wang (Australia) Warren Luff
8	(China) Shanghai International Circuit	26 September	(Hong Kong) No. 88 Craft-Bamboo Racing	(Hong Kong) No. 99 Craft-Bamboo Racing	(Japan) No. 20 Gulf Racing JP
8	(China) Shanghai International Circuit	26 September	(United Kingdom) Richard Lyons (Hong Kong) Frank Yu	(Hong Kong) Darryl O'Young (United Kingdom) Daniel Lloyd	(Belgium) Dylan Derdaele (Japan) Hisashi Kunie
9	(China) Shanghai International Circuit	27 September	(Hong Kong) No. 99 Craft-Bamboo Racing	(Hong Kong) No. 99 Craft-Bamboo Racing	(Hong Kong) No. 69 Golden CMT RT
9	(China) Shanghai International Circuit	27 September	(Hong Kong) Darryl O'Young (United Kingdom) Daniel Lloyd	(Hong Kong) Darryl O'Young (United Kingdom) Daniel Lloyd	(Hong Kong) James Cai (Hong Kong) Kenneth Lim
10	(Thailand) Chang International Circuit	24 October	(Hong Kong) No. 77 Bentley Team Absolute	(Hong Kong) No. 77 Bentley Team Absolute	(Thailand) No. 59 Singha Motorsport
10	(Thailand) Chang International Circuit	24 October	(United Kingdom) Duncan Tappy (Denmark) Benny Simonsen	(United Kingdom) Duncan Tappy (Denmark) Benny Simonsen	(France) Benjamin Rouget (Thailand) Bhurit Bhirom Bhakdi
11	(Thailand) Chang International Circuit	25 October	(Hong Kong) No. 8 Bentley Team Absolute	(Hong Kong) No. 99 Craft-Bamboo Racing	(Thailand) No. 89 Singha Motorsport
11	(Thailand) Chang International Circuit	25 October	(Hong Kong) Adderly Fong (Japan) Keita Sawa	(Hong Kong) Darryl O'Young (United Kingdom) Daniel Lloyd	(Thailand) Kantasak Kusiri (Thailand) Voravud Bhirom Bhakdi
NC	(Macau) Guia Circuit	22 November	(Germany) No. 1 Mercedes AMG Driving Academy	(Germany) No. 1 Mercedes AMG Driving Academy	no entries allowed
NC	(Macau) Guia Circuit	22 November	(Germany) Maro Engel	(Germany) Maro Engel	no entries allowed

== Championship standings ==
Scoring system

Position	1st	2nd	3rd	4th	5th	6th	7th	8th	9th	10th	11th	12th
Points	18	16	14	10	9	8	7	6	5	4	2	1
Sepang 3 Hour	36	32	28	20	18	16	14	12	10	8	4	2

=== Drivers' championship (overall) ===
Rank	Driver	KOR (South Korea)		OKA (Japan)		FUJ (Japan)		SEP (Malaysia)	SHA (China)		CHA (Thailand)		Points
1	(Hong Kong) Darryl O'Young	Ret	1	4	3	9	2	3	1	1	4	1	155
2	(Hong Kong) Adderly Fong (Japan) Keita Sawa	8	3	7	1	13	1	2	3	3	3	3	151
4	(China) Anthony Liu (Italy) Davide Rizzo	1	2	3	5			1	11	2	7	2	134
6	(Thailand) Piti Bhirombhakdi	Ret	4	2	6	1	Ret	5	2	5	5	Ret	104
7	(United Kingdom) Duncan Tappy	6	12	8	8	5	8	6	6	6	1	4	96
8	(Netherlands) Carlo van Dam			2	6	1	Ret	5	2	5	5	Ret	94
9	(United Kingdom) Daniel Lloyd							3	1	1	4	1	92
10	(Japan) Hiroshi Hamaguchi	DSQ	6	1	11	4	Ret	Ret	4	8	2	5	79
11	(Singapore) Weng Sun Mok	2	Ret	DNS	DNS	2	5	4	5	Ret	12	11	76
12	(United Kingdom) Richard Lyons (Hong Kong) Frank Yu	3	9	12	2	11	17	10	10	7	6	8	72
12	(Singapore) Richard Wee	Ret	5	6	4	3	4	Ret	9	10	9	9	70
15	(Taiwan) Jeffrey Lee	5	7	5	Ret	14	7	9	8	9	10	7	64
16	(Australia) Jonathan Venter	Ret	1	4	3	9	2						63
17	(Italy) Max Wiser (China) Jiang Xin	4	Ret	Ret	10	Ret	3		7	4	8	6	59
19	(Republic of Ireland) Matt Griffin			6	4	3	4		9	10	12	11	57
20	(Hong Kong) Jacky Yeung	6	12	8	8	5	8	6					52
21	(Malaysia) Fairuz Fauzy (Malaysia) Zen Low	Ret	8	9	7	7	9	8	Ret	11	DNS	DNS	44
23	(Portugal) Alvaro Parente								4	5	2	5	41
24	(Italy) Vitantonio Liuzzi	DSQ	6	1	11	4	Ret	Ret	Ret	DNS			38
25	(United Kingdom) James Calado	2	Ret					4					36
26	(Denmark) Benny Simonsen						5				1	4	28
27	(Finland) Toni Vilander					2	5						25
27	(China) Fu Songyang	7	10	13	9	10	10						25
29	(United Kingdom) Andy Meyrick							9	8	9			21
30	(Sri Lanka) Dilantha Malagamuwa (Japan) Kota Sasaki			11	Ret	6	6						19
32	(Italy) Andrea Caldarelli	7	10	13	9			Ret			Ret	Ret	17
33	(Spain) Andy Soucek			5	Ret	14	7						16
33	(France) Jean-Karl Vernay	5	7										16
33	(South Korea) Andrew Kim								6	6			16
36	(Malaysia) Dominic Ang (Malaysia) Adrian D'Silva							7					14
38	(Japan) Hisashi Kunie	10	14	10	Ret	20	16	14	12	Ret	12	11	12
39	(Switzerland) Alexandre Imperatori										10	7	11
40	(Japan) Naoki Yokomizo	Ret	4										10
40	(Japan) Hiroki Katoh							Ret			9	9	10
42	(New Zealand) Craig Baird	Ret	5										9
42	(Hong Kong) Jerry Wang	9	13	16	Ret	19	Ret	11					9
42	(Italy) Alessandro Pier Guidi								5				9
45	(Portugal) André Couto					10	10						8
45	(Belgium) Dylan Derdaele			10	Ret			14	12	Ret	12	11	8
47	(Australia) Nathan Antunes (Australia) Rod Salmon					8	12	16	Ret	DNS			7
49	(Japan) Keiichi Mori	10	14			16	18	17					4
49	(Australia) Warren Luff							11					4
51	(Japan) Kimihiro Yashiro	Ret	11	15	12	20	16		DNS	DNS			3
51	(Hong Kong) Philip Ma (China) Ho-Pin Tung					12	11		13	13			3
54	(Japan) Shouta Hanaoka	Ret	11										2
54	(Malaysia) Keong Wee Lim (Malaysia) Melvin Moh							12					2
57	(Hong Kong) James Cai (Hong Kong) Kenneth Lim					15	15		14	12	15	Ret	1
57	(Japan) Tetsuya Makino			15	12			17					1
	(Japan) Takuma Aoki (Japan) Ken Urata			14	13	17	20	Ret					0
	(Taiwan) Craig Liu					18	13	18					0
	(Japan) Ryo Fukuda					18	13						0
	(Hong Kong) Nigel Farmer (Malaysia) Keong Liam Lim							13					0
	(Japan) Akira Iida (Japan) Taiyo Iida					21	14						0
	(Taiwan) George Chou					Ret	Ret	15					0
	(Taiwan) Robert Lee							15					0
	(Japan) Yutaka Yamamoto					16	18						0
	(Taiwan) K.S. Wang					DNS	19	18					0
	(Japan) Shogo Mitsuyama					DNS	19						0
	(Taiwan) Jeff Lu					Ret	Ret						0
	(Hong Kong) Yuk Lung Siu (Malaysia) Mak Hing Tak							Ret					0
	(New Zealand) John Curran (New Zealand) Graeme Dowsett							Ret					0
	(Hong Kong) Ronald Wu							Ret					0
	(Italy) Gianmaria Bruni			DNS	DNS								0
	(France) Benjamin Rouget (Thailand) Bhurit Bhirom Bhakdi										13	Ret	0
	(Thailand) Kantasak Kusiri (Thailand) Voravud Bhirom Bhakdi										Ret	13	0
Rank	Driver	KOR (South Korea)		OKA (Japan)		FUJ (Japan)		SEP (Malaysia)	SHA (China)		CHA (Thailand)		Points

Colour	Result
Gold	Winner
Silver	Second place
Bronze	Third place
Green	Points classification
Blue	Non-points classification
Blue	Non-classified finish (NC)
Purple	Retired, not classified (Ret)
Red	Did not qualify (DNQ)
Red	Did not pre-qualify (DNPQ)
Black	Disqualified (DSQ)
White	Did not start (DNS)
White	Withdrew (WD)
White	Race cancelled (C)
Blank	Did not practice (DNP)
Blank	Did not arrive (DNA)
Blank	Excluded (EX)
