= Anthony Liu (racing driver) =

Chinese racing driver (born 1984)

Anthony Liu 刘旭
- Nationality: (China) Chinese
- Born: 21 October 1984 (age 42) Shanghai, China
- Categorisation: FIA Silver (until 2014); FIA Bronze (2015–)

Championship titles
- 2023, 2024 2023 2021 2012: GT World Challenge Asia – GT3 Pro-Am; GT World Challenge Asia – GT3; China GT Championship – GT3; Lamborghini Super Trofeo Asia – Pro-Am

Liu Xu (Chinese: 刘旭; pinyin: Liú Xù; born 21 October 1984), better known as Anthony Liu, is a Chinese racing driver who last competed in GT World Challenge Asia for Phantom Global Racing. He has been GT World Challenge Asia champion with Craft-Bamboo Racing and Phantom Global Racing, and Asian Le Mans Series runner-up in LMP2 with BBT.

== Career ==
Liu began his racing career in 2011, making one-off appearances in Ferrari Challenge Asia Pacific and for Team Betterlife in Porsche Carrera Cup Asia. In 2012, Liu returned to the latter series with BBT, but his main campaign lied in Lamborghini Super Trofeo Asia, in which he clinched the Pro-Am title alongside Davide Rizzo. In 2013, Liu remained with BBT to make the switch to the GTC class of the Asian Le Mans Series, sharing a Lamborghini Gallardo GT3 with Rizzo, and taking a lone podium at Inje to end the year fourth in points. On 6 April, Liu set a speed record for production convertible cars in a Bugatti Veyron 16.4 Grand Sport Vitesse at Volkswagen's proving grounds in Ehra-Lessien, reaching a top speed of 408.84 km/h (254.04 mph).

Switching to Ferrari machinery for 2014, Liu and Rizzo moved to Spirit of Race to race in the GT Asia Series. Racing in the GT3 class, the pair won twice in Korea and once at Shanghai to secure runner-up honours in points. Returning to BBT Racing for 2015 but retaining the Ferrari 458 Italia GT3, Liu and Rizzo won in Korea and Sepang, and racked up four other podiums to end the year third in GT3. Continuing in GT Asia for a third season with the new Ferrari 488 GT3, the duo scored wins at Buriram and Shanghai to secure another third-place points finish. At the end of the year, Liu continued with BBT to race in the 2016–17 Asian Le Mans Series alongside Rizzo and Ferrari factory driver Alessandro Pier Guidi, who guided them to three podiums and third in the GT standings.

For the rest of 2017, Liu moved to Blancpain GT Series Asia, grabbing a lone overall win at Sepang with BBT, before making his Blancpain GT Series Endurance Cup debut at Le Castellet. In the winter, Liu and Rizzo raced with AF Corse–run BBT in the LMP2 class of the 2017–18 Asian Le Mans Series alongside Pipo Derani, securing a clean sweep of podiums and runner-up honours behind Jackie Chan DC Racing. Switching to Absolute Racing and the Audi R8 LMS for his full-time debut in Blancpain GT Series Asia, Liu took Pro-Am wins at Shanghai and Ningbo with Alessio Picariello to end the season fourth in class. In 2019, Liu made one-off appearances in the Asian Le Mans Series for Audi Sport Customer Racing Asia by TSRT, and GT World Challenge Asia for Porsche-fielding JRM.

After a year on the sidelines, Liu joined FAW Audi Sport Asia Racing Team to compete in China GT in 2021, securing the GT3 title with Cheng Congfu. Two years later, in 2023, Liu returned to drive a Mercedes-AMG GT3 Evo in GT World Challenge Asia for Craft-Bamboo Racing. He won on return at Buriram with Fabian Schiller, and took further victories at Suzuka and Okayama with Daniel Juncadella to secure the overall and GT3 Pro-Am titles. At the end of the season, Liu dabbled between Craft-Bamboo and AlManar Racing by GetSpeed in the 2023–24 Asian Le Mans Series, qualifying on pole three times and taking a best result of second at Dubai for the latter team.

Swapping brands again in 2024, Liu reunited with Absolute Racing to share a Porsche 911 GT3 R (992) with Alessio Picariello in GT World Challenge Asia. Liu won at Fuji and Shanghai to successfully defend his Pro-Am title, as he settled for second in the overall standings. Moving to Phantom Global Racing with Dorian Boccolacci in 2025, Liu scored a lone Pro-Am win at Okayama and three other podiums to take fourth in points. In 2026, Liu continued in GTWC Asia with Phantom Global Racing, with a revolving door of divers joining him. Liu took his seventh overall win in the series at Mandalika (with Loek Hartog), before taking a class win at Beijing to end the year third in Pro-Am.

== Racing record ==
=== Racing career summary ===
Season	Series	Team	Races	Wins	Poles	F/Laps	Podiums	Points	Position
2011	Porsche Carrera Cup Asia	Team Betterlife	2	0	0	0	0	9	23rd
2011	Ferrari Challenge Asia Pacific – Trofeo Pirelli								
2012	Porsche Carrera Cup Asia	BBT	2	0	0	0	0	20	18th
2012	Lamborghini Super Trofeo Asia – Pro-Am								**1st**
2013	Asian Le Mans Series – GTC	BBT Racing	4	0	0	0	1	39	4th
2014	GT Asia Series – GT3	Spirit of Race	13	3	0	0	8	159	**2nd**
2014	Ferrari Challenge Asia Pacific – Trofeo Pirelli		2	2	2	2	2		
2015	GT Asia Series – GT3	BBT Racing	9	2	0	0	6	134	**3rd**
2015	Lamborghini Super Trofeo Asia – Pro-Am		5	2	0	0	2		
2016	GT Asia Series – GT3	BBT Racing	12	2	0	0	5	119	**3rd**
2016	Audi R8 LMS Cup China		4	0	0	0	0	20	13th
2016–17	Asian Le Mans Series – GT	Team BBT	3	0	0	0	3	53	**3rd**
2017	Blancpain GT Series Asia – GT3	BBT	6	1	0	0	1	33	16th
2017	Blancpain GT Series Asia – GT3 Pro-Am	BBT	6	1	0	0	2	55	10th
2017	Blancpain GT Series Endurance Cup	BBT	1	0	0	0	0	0	NC
2017	Blancpain GT Series Endurance Cup – Pro-Am	BBT	1	0	0	0	0	0	NC
2017	Audi R8 LMS Cup China		4	0	0	0	0	10	14th
2017–18	Asian Le Mans Series – LMP2	BBT	4	0	0	0	4	70	**2nd**
2018	Blancpain GT Series Asia – GT3	Absolute Racing	12	0	0	0	3	69	12th
2018	Blancpain GT Series Asia – GT3 Pro-Am	Absolute Racing	12	2	0	0	5	141	4th
2018–19	Asian Le Mans Series – GT	Audi Sport Customer Racing Asia by TSRT	1	0	0	0	0	12	12th
2019	Audi R8 LMS Cup – GT3		2	2	2	2	2	52	7th
2019	Blancpain GT World Challenge Asia – GT3	JRM	2	0	0	0	1	19	27th
2019	Blancpain GT World Challenge Asia – GT3 Pro-Am	JRM	2	0	0	0	1	30	18th
2021	China GT Championship – GT3	FAW Audi Sport Asia Racing Team							**1st**
2023	GT World Challenge Asia – GT3	Craft-Bamboo Racing	12	3	0	0	5	142	**1st**
2023	GT World Challenge Asia – GT3 Pro-Am	Craft-Bamboo Racing	12	3	0	0	5	144	**1st**
2023–24	Asian Le Mans Series – GT	Craft-Bamboo Racing	2	0	1	0	0	31	9th
2023–24	Asian Le Mans Series – GT	AlManar Racing by GetSpeed	3	0	2	0	1	31	9th
2024	GT World Challenge Asia	Absolute Racing	12	2	0	0	4	131	**2nd**
2024	GT World Challenge Asia – Pro-Am	Absolute Racing	12	2	0	0	6	173	**1st**
2025	GT World Challenge Asia	Phantom Global Racing	12	0	0	0	4	99	4th
2025	GT World Challenge Asia – Pro-Am	Phantom Global Racing	12	1	0	0	4	128	4th
2026	GT World Challenge Asia	Phantom Global Racing	12	1	1	0	3	118	4th
2026	GT World Challenge Asia – Pro-Am	Phantom Global Racing	12	2	5	0	7	175	**3rd**
2026	China GT Championship – GT3	Harmony Racing						*	*
2026	China GT Championship – GT3 Pro-Am	Harmony Racing						*	*

* Season still in progress.

^{†} As Liu was a guest driver, he was ineligible for points.

=== Complete Asian Le Mans Series results ===
(key) (Races in bold indicate pole position) (Races in italics indicate fastest lap)

Year	Team	Class	Car	Engine	1	2	3	4	5	Pos.	Points
2013	BBT Racing	GTC	Lamborghini Gallardo GT3	Lamborghini 5.2 L V10	INJ; 3	FUJ; Ret	ZHU; 4	SEP; 4		4th	39
2016–17	Team BBT	GT	Ferrari 488 GT3	Ferrari F154CB 3.9 L Turbo V8	ZHU; DNS	**FUJ**; 2	**BUR**; 2	SEP; 3		3rd	53
2017–18	BBT	LMP2	Ligier JS P2	Nissan VK45DE 4.5 L V8	SHA; 2	**FUJ**; 2	BUR; 3	SEP; 2		2nd	70
2018–19	Audi Sport Customer Racing Asia by TSRT	GT	Audi R8 LMS	Audi DAR 5.2 L V10	SHA	FUJ; 4	CHA	SEP		12th	12
2023–24	Craft-Bamboo Racing	GT	Mercedes-AMG GT3 Evo	Mercedes-AMG M159 6.2 L V8	SEP; 1 Ret	**SEP**; **2**; 8				9th	31
2023–24	AlManar Racing by GetSpeed	GT	Mercedes-AMG GT3 Evo	Mercedes-AMG M159 6.2 L V8			**DUB**; 2	**ABU**; **1**; 9	ABU; 2; 8	9th	31

=== Complete GT World Challenge Asia results ===
(key) (Races in bold indicate pole position) (Races in italics indicate fastest lap)

Year	Team	Car	Class	1	2	3	4	5	6	7	8	9	10	11	12	DC	Points
2017	BBT	Ferrari 488 GT3	GT3 Pro-Am	SEP; 1; 7	SEP; 2; 1	**BUR**; **1** Ret	BUR; 2 Ret	SUZ; 1	SUZ; 2							10th	55
2017	BBT	Audi R8 LMS	GT3 Pro-Am							FUJ; 1; 2	FUJ; 2; 7	SHA; 1	SHA; 2	ZHE; 1	ZHE; 2	10th	55
2018	Absolute Racing	Audi R8 LMS	GT3 Pro-Am	SEP; 1; 2	**SEP**; **2**; 2	BUR; 1; 4	BUR; 2; 3	SUZ; 1; 9	SUZ; 2; 6	FUJ; 1; 4	FUJ; 2; 7	SHA; 1; 1	SHA; 2 Ret	**ZHE**; **1** Ret	ZHE; 2; 1	4th	141
2019	JRM	Porsche 911 GT3 R	GT3 Pro-Am	SEP; 1	SEP; 2	CHA; 1	CHA; 2	SUZ; 1	SUZ; 2	FUJ; 1	FUJ; 2	**KOR**; **1**; 4	KOR; 2; 2	SHA; 1	SHA; 2	18th	30
2023	Craft-Bamboo Racing	Mercedes-AMG GT3 Evo	GT3 Pro-Am	BUR; 1; 9	BUR; 2; 1	FUJ; 1; 5	**FUJ**; **2** Ret	SUZ; 1; 17	**SUZ**; **2**; 1	MOT; 1; 3	MOT; 2; 5	OKA; 1; 1	OKA; 2; 4	SEP; 1; 2	SEP; 2; 9	1st	144
2024	Absolute Racing	Porsche 911 GT3 R (992)	Pro-Am	SEP; 1; 3	SEP; 2; 6	BUR; 1; 2	BUR; 2; 2	FUJ; 1; 4	FUJ; 2; 1	SUZ; 1; 4	SUZ; 2; 2	OKA; 1; 5	OKA; 2; 9	SHA; 1; 1	SHA; 2; 5	1st	173
2025	Phantom Global Racing	Porsche 911 GT3 R (992)	Pro-Am	SEP; 1; 2	SEP; 2; 4	**MAN**; **1**; 3	MAN; 2; 2	**BUR**; **1**; 6	BUR; 2; 4	FUJ; 1; 14	FUJ; 2; 7	**OKA**; **1**; 1	OKA; 2; 4	BEI; 1 Ret	BEI; 2; 9	4th	128
2026	Phantom Global Racing	Porsche 911 GT3 R (992.2)	Pro-Am	SEP; 1; 2	SEP; 2; 2	**MAN**; **1**; 8	**MAN**; **2**; 1	**FUJ**; **1**; 5	FUJ; 2; 2	OKA; 1; 7	OKA; 2; 3	**BEI**; **1**; 1	BEI; 2; 7	**SHA**; **1**; 2	SHA; 2; 4	3rd	175

=== Complete GT World Challenge Europe results ===
==== GT World Challenge Europe Endurance Cup ====
(key) (Races in bold indicate pole position; races in italics indicate fastest lap)

Year	Team	Car	Class	1	2	3	4	5	6	7	Pos.	Points
2017	BBT	Ferrari 488 GT3	Pro-Am	MNZ	SIL	LEC; Ret	SPA; 6H	SPA; 12H	SPA; 24H	CAT	NC	0
