= 2023 TCR Taiwan Series =

The 2023 TCR Taiwan Series, officially called the TCR Chinese Taipei Series, is the second season of the TCR Taiwan Series. All rounds are to be held at the same venue, Lihpao Racing Park, and started on 30 April 2023 and is set to end on 29 October 2023. Each race lasts one hour.

== Calendar ==
Round	Circuit	Date
1	(Taiwan) Lihpao Racing Park	30 April
2	(Taiwan) Lihpao Racing Park	2 July
3	(Taiwan) Lihpao Racing Park	20 August
4	(Taiwan) Lihpao Racing Park	29 October

== Entries ==
Team	Car	No.	Drivers	Class	Rounds
(Taiwan) BC Racing	Alfa-Romeo Giulietta Veloce TCR	51	(Taiwan) Huang Chin-Chang (Taiwan) Huang Shu-Ni (Taiwan) Huang Chun-Chih (Taiwan) Liao Chun-Hao	A B	1–2; 1–2; 4; 4
(Taiwan) BC Racing	Alfa-Romeo Giulietta Veloce TCR	11	(Taiwan) Huang Chun-Chih (Taiwan) Liao Chun-Hao (Taiwan) Huang Shu-Ni (Taiwan) Liao Chia-Ling	B	1–2; 1–2; 4; 4
(Taiwan) Border Team	Audi RS3 LMS TCR SEQ; Honda Civic FK7 TCR	75	(Taiwan) Huang Chien-Yeh (Taiwan) Yu Yi-Hao	A	All
(Taiwan) Border Team	Cupra TCR SEQ; Honda Civic FK2 TCR	76	(Taiwan) Huang Szu-Chia (Taiwan) Hsu Jen-Kuang	B	All; 3–4
(Taiwan) Carsman Racing	Honda Civic FK8 TCR	23	(Taiwan) Kao Chieh (Taiwan) Weng Chih-Yuan	A	4; 4
(Taiwan) Carsman Racing	Honda Civic FK8 TCR	7	(Taiwan) Chen Chin-Hung	B	1
(Taiwan) GH-Team AAI	Honda Civic FK8 TCR	15	(Taiwan) Liu Wei-Chih (Taiwan) Chen Chun-Hua	A	All; 4
(Taiwan) GH-Team AAI	Honda Civic FK8 TCR	91	(Taiwan) Shih Shih-Wei (Hong Kong) Shaun Thong (Taiwan) Chen Chun-Hua	A	All; 1, 3–4; 2
(Taiwan) KOE Racing	Honda Civic FK8 TCR; Cupra TCR SEQ	26	(Taiwan) Chuang Chi-Shun (Taiwan) Tsai Chang-Ta	A	1, 4; 1, 4
(Taiwan) KOE Racing	Cupra TCR SEQ; Audi RS 3 LMS TCR SEQ	1	(Taiwan) Chen Hung-Wei (Taiwan) He Shu-Hsian (Taiwan) Hu Han-Chung	B	1–3; All; 4
(Taiwan) KOE Racing	Honda Civic FK8 TCR	96	(Taiwan) Chen Chun-Fu (Taiwan) Su Yen-Ming	A	4; 4
(Taiwan) KOE SX83 Racing Team	Honda Civic FK8 TCR	96	(Taiwan) Chen Chun-Fu (Taiwan) Su Yen-Ming	A	1; 1
(Taiwan) KOE SX83 Racing Team	VW Golf GTI TCR SEQ	63	(Taiwan) Lo Tien-Yi	B	1–2
(Taiwan) Liming Racing	Honda Civic FK8 TCR	89	(Taiwan) Kao Tzu-Lung (Taiwan) Wu Yi-Chan (Taiwan) Chuang Chi-Shun	A B	1, 3–4; 1, 4; 3
(Taiwan) Molife	Audi RS 3 LMS TCR SEQ	77	(Taiwan) Wang Shang-Yuan (Taiwan) Yang Meng-Chiao	A	1, 4; 1, 4
(Taiwan) Speed Verse Raicing Academy	Audi RS3 LMS TCR SEQ	14	(Taiwan) Hung Yu-Hung (Taiwan) Yao Yuan-Hao (Hong Kong) Lo Sze-Ho	A	1; 1–2, 4; 2
(Taiwan) Speed Verse Raicing Academy	Honda Civic FK8 TCR	85	(Taiwan) Kao Chia-Hung	A	1–2, 4
(Taiwan) Triple S Team	VW Golf GTI TCR SEQ	35	(Taiwan) Liang Wen-Yao (Taiwan) Su Chien-Hua	B	All
(Taiwan) YSR Motorsport	VW Golf GTI TCR SEQ	21	(Taiwan) Lin Yuan-Hu (Taiwan) Yuan Sheng-Ping	A	1; 1
(Taiwan) Yu Speed	Audi RS3 LMS TCR SEQ	39	(Taiwan) Chang Wei-Chung	A	1–3
(Taiwan) Yu Speed	Audi RS3 LMS TCR DSG	88	(Taiwan) Chen Chih-Chung	B	2
(Taiwan) Zuver	Audi RS3 LMS TCR SEQ	57	(Taiwan) Lee Cheng-Yu	B	1–2, 4

Icon	Class
A	Class A
B	Class B

== Results and standings ==
=== Season summary ===
Rnd.	Circuit	Class A Winners	Class B Winners	Ref.
1	(Taiwan) Lihpao	(Taiwan) No. 91 GH-Team AAI	(Taiwan) No. 89 Liming Racing	
1	(Taiwan) Lihpao	(Taiwan) Shih Shih-Wei (Hong Kong) Shaun Thong	(Taiwan) Kao Tzu-Lung (Taiwan) Wu Yi-Chan	
2	(Taiwan) Lihpao	(Taiwan) No. 91 GH-Team AAI	(Taiwan) No. 11 BC Racing	
2	(Taiwan) Lihpao	(Taiwan) Chen Chun-Hua (Taiwan) Shih Shih-Wei	(Taiwan) Huang Chun-Chih (Taiwan) Liao Chun-Hao	
3	(Taiwan) Lihpao	(Taiwan) No. 91 GH-Team AAI	(Taiwan) No. 35 Triple S Team	
3	(Taiwan) Lihpao	(Taiwan) Shih Shih-Wei (Hong Kong) Shaun Thong	(Taiwan) Liang Wen-Yao (Taiwan) Su Chien-Hua	
4	(Taiwan) Lihpao	(Taiwan) No. 91 GH-Team AAI	(Taiwan) No. 89 Liming Racing	
4	(Taiwan) Lihpao	(Taiwan) Shih Shih-Wei (Hong Kong) Shaun Thong	(Taiwan) Kao Tzu-Lung (Taiwan) Wu Yi-Chan	

=== Drivers' Championship ===
Points systems
Round		1st	2nd	3rd	4th	5th	6th	7th	8th	9th	10th
1	Class A	20	15	12	10	8	6	4	3	2	1
1	Class B	15	10	8	6	4	2	1			
2	Class A	15	10	8	6	4	2	1			
2	Class B	15	10	8	6	4	2	1			
3	Class A	12	8	5							
3	Class B	12	8	5							
4	Class A	15	10	8	6	4	2	1			
4	Class B	15	10	8	6	4	2	1			

==== Class A ====
(Races in bold indicate pole position; results in italics indicate fastest lap)

Pos.	Driver	Team	LIH1	LIH2	LIH3	LIH4	Points
1	(Taiwan) Shih Shih-Wei	(Taiwan) GH-Team AAI	**1**	1	1	**1**	62
2	(Hong Kong) Shaun Thong	(Taiwan) GH-Team AAI	**1**		1	**1**	47
3	(Taiwan) Liu Wei-Chih	(Taiwan) GH-Team AAI	2	**2**	**3**	2	40
4	(Taiwan) Chen Chun-Hua	(Taiwan) GH-Team AAI		1		2	25
5	(Taiwan) Huang Chien-Yeh	(Taiwan) Border Racing	7	3	2	Ret	20
5	(Taiwan) Yu Yi-Hao	(Taiwan) Border Racing	7	3	2	Ret	20
7	(Taiwan) Chuang Chi-Shun	(Taiwan) KOE Racing (Taiwan) Liming Racing	3		Ret	4	18
7	(Taiwan) Tsai Chang-Ta	(Taiwan) KOE Racing	3			4	18
9	(Taiwan) Wang Shang-Yuan	(Taiwan) Molife	6	4		5	16
9	(Taiwan) Yang Meng-Chiao	(Taiwan) Molife	6	4		5	16
11	(Taiwan) Kao Chia-Hung	(Taiwan) Speed Verse Raicing Academy	5	6		7	11
12	(Taiwan) Lin Yuan-Hu	(Taiwan) YSR Motorsport	4				10
12	(Taiwan) Yuan-Sheng-Ping	(Taiwan) YSR Motorsport	4				10
14	(Taiwan) Chen Chun-Fu	(Taiwan) KOE Racing (Taiwan) KOE SX83 Racing Team	DNS			3	8
14	(Taiwan) Su Yen-Ming	(Taiwan) KOE Racing (Taiwan) KOE SX83 Racing Team	DNS			3	8
16	(Taiwan) Yao Yuan-Hao	(Taiwan) Speed Verse Raicing Academy	Ret	5		6	6
17	(Hong Kong) Lo Sze-Ho	(Taiwan) Speed Verse Raicing Academy		5			4
18	(Taiwan) Huang Chin-Chang	(Taiwan) BC Racing	8	Ret			3
18	(Taiwan) Huang Shu-Ni	(Taiwan) BC Racing	8	Ret			3
20	(Taiwan) Chang Wei-Chung	(Taiwan) Yu Speed	Ret	DNS	DNS		0
20	(Taiwan) Hung Yu-Hung	(Taiwan) Speed Verse Raicing Academy	Ret				0
20	(Taiwan) Kao Chieh	(Taiwan) Carsman Racing				Ret	0
20	(Taiwan) Kao Tzu-Lung	(Taiwan) Liming Racing			Ret		0
20	(Taiwan) Weng Chih-Yuan	(Taiwan) Carsman Racing				Ret	0

==== Class B ====
Pos.	Driver	Team	LIH1	LIH2	LIH3	LIH4	Points
1	(Taiwan) He Shu-Hsien	(Taiwan) KOE Racing	2	2	2	2	38
2	(Taiwan) Kao Tzu-Lung	(Taiwan) Liming Racing	1			1	30
2	(Taiwan) Wu Yi-Chan	(Taiwan) Liming Racing	1			1	30
4	(Taiwan) Chen Hung-Wei	(Taiwan) KOE Racing	2	2	2		28
5	(Taiwan) Liang Wen-Yao	(Taiwan) Triple S Team	Ret	4	1	3	26
5	(Taiwan) Su Chien-Hua	(Taiwan) Triple S Team	Ret	4	1	3	26
7	(Taiwan) Huang Chun-Chih	(Taiwan) BC Racing	6	1		4	23
7	(Taiwan) Liao Chun-Hao	(Taiwan) BC Racing	6	1		4	23
9	(Taiwan) Huang Szu-Chia	(Taiwan) Border Team	5	5	3	5	17
10	(Taiwan) Lee Cheng-Yu	(Taiwan) Zuver	3	3		Ret	16
11	(Taiwan) Hu Han-Chung	(Taiwan) KOE Racing				2	10
12	(Taiwan) Hsu Jen-Kuang	(Taiwan) Border Team			3	5	9
13	(Taiwan) Lo Tien-Yi	(Taiwan) KOE SX83 Racing Team	4	6			8
14	(Taiwan) Chen Chin-Hung	(Taiwan) Carsman Racing	7				1
15	(Taiwan) Chen Chih-Chung	(Taiwan) Yu Speed		DNS			0
15	(Taiwan) Huang Shu-Ni	(Taiwan) BC Racing				DNS	0
15	(Taiwan) Liao Chia-Ling	(Taiwan) BC Racing				DNS	0

Colour	Result
Gold	Winner
Silver	Second place
Bronze	Third place
Green	Points classification
Blue	Non-points classification
Blue	Non-classified finish (NC)
Purple	Retired, not classified (Ret)
Red	Did not qualify (DNQ)
Red	Did not pre-qualify (DNPQ)
Black	Disqualified (DSQ)
White	Did not start (DNS)
White	Withdrew (WD)
White	Race cancelled (C)
Blank	Did not practice (DNP)
Blank	Did not arrive (DNA)
Blank	Excluded (EX)

=== Teams' Championship ===
Pos.	Team	LIH1	LIH2	LIH3	LIH4	Points
1	(Taiwan) GH-Team AAI	35	25	17	25	102
2	(Taiwan) KOE Racing	22	10	8	18	58
3	(Taiwan) Border Team	8	12	13	4	37
4	(Taiwan) Liming Racing	15	0	0	15	30
5	(Taiwan) BC Racing	5	15	0	6	26
6	(Taiwan) Triple S Team	0	6	12	8	26
7	(Taiwan) Speed Verse Racing Academy	8	6	0	3	17
8	(Taiwan) Zuver	8	8	0	0	16
9	(Taiwan) Molife	6	6	0	4	16
10	(Taiwan) YSR Motorsport	10	0	0	0	10
11	(Taiwan) KOE SX83 Racing Team	6	2	0	0	8
12	(Taiwan) Carsman Racing	1	0	0	0	1
13	(Taiwan) Yu Speed	0	0	0	0	0
