= Shaun Thong =

Hong Kong racing driver (born 1995)

Shaun Thong 唐偉楓
- Nationality: Hong Kong
- Born: 1 November 1995 (age 31) British Hong Kong
- Categorisation: FIA Bronze (until 2015); FIA Silver (2016–)

Previous series
- 2018-21 2021 2019-20 2018-19 2017-18 2017-19 2016 2015-16 2015 2015 2014 2013 2012: Super Taikyu Series; European Le Mans Series; Asian Le Mans Series; Dubai 24 Hours; Asian Le Mans Series; Blancpain GT Asia; GT Asia Series; 24 Hours Nürburgring; Blancpain Endurance Series; Audi Sport TT Cup; Euroformula Open Championship; British Formula Renault; Asian Formula Renault

Championship titles
- 2020 2017 2016 2014: Super Taikyu Series; Blancpain GT Asia; GT Asia Series; EuroFormula Open Winter Series

Wei Fung Shaun Thong 唐偉楓 (Born 1 November 1995 in Hong Kong, China) is a racecar driver from Hong Kong. Born in 1995, He is the 2017 Blancpain GT Series Asia Silver Cup champion and the 2020 Super Taikyu Series Champion. Thong is the first and only Chinese driver so far to win the Super Taikyu Series title in history. Thong began karting at the age of 14 and participated in various Asian Karting Championships including the Chinese Karting Championship (CKC), Asian Karting Open Championship (AKOC), Hong Kong Kart Club Championship (HKKC) and CIK KF1.

By the age of 16, Thong participated in the Renault Clio Cup China in 2011 as a guest driver and finished twice on the podium. Thong was then chosen by Formula Racing Development Limited to race in the 2012 Asian Formula Renault Series and finished third overall after securing one win and two podiums at his inaugural season. After his debut season in single seaters, Thong proceeded to Europe for Formula Renault and Formula 3 before moving to the Sportscar / Prototype racing categories.

In 2015, Thong joined Audi Sport Customer Racing Asia young driver development program and competes in the coveted 24 Hours Nürburgring, Blancpain Endurance Series, Audi Sport TT Cup, as well as the Audi R8 LMS Cup. Thong remains as their selected driver until today with Audi Sport Asia.

In 2019 Thong entered full season of Super GT, becoming the first Hong Kong Driver to enter a full season alongside Marchy Lee. The pair scored a 100% Q2 Super Pole qualify in their debut season as an International team and remained as the only team to achieve it so far.

In 2020, Thong became the first Hong Kong Driver to win the Super Taikyu Series Fuji SuperTec 24 Hours and claimed the overall title after winning two races in the season with Hirix Racing. In 2022, Thong joined Helm Motorsport for the Fuji SuperTec 24 Hours only and won his second Fuji SuperTec 24 Hours, becoming the first and only non Japanese driver to win twice and the first driver to win the pinnacle Japan endurance race with two different manufacturers (Mercedes AMG in 2020) and (Nismo in 2022).

== Career ==
=== 2012 / Karting ===
Thong raced in the 2012 Asian Formula Renault Challenge with Formula Racing Development Limited, winning one race and with two podium finishes. Thong finished third in his debut year of single seater championship. Apart from Asian Formula Renault Challenge, Thong also participated in the final round of the Maserati Trofeo MC World Series and finished sixth and was awarded for "The Best Asian Driver".Thong also participated in the Malaysia Super Series GT Open Class with two podium finishes.

Apart from car racing, Thong also entered the final round of the CIK-FIA KF-1 World Championship held in Macau after finishing 2nd overall in the Hong Kong Kart Club 125cc Class C with two wins and two other podium finishes.

=== 2013 ===
Thong joined Fortec Motorsports squad to race in the Protyre Formula Renault Championship in 2013 and secured one pole position and oen fastest lap in the final round held in Silverstone. Despite finishing 16th in the championship, Thong showed strong potential by constantly qualifying in top 3 in 2013. Thong also made his debut in the third round of Asian Le Mans Series in Zhuhai and won the overall and LMP2 class with OAK Racing in a Morgan / Judd LMP2 prototype. He also made an appearance in the round 7 and 8 Audi R8 LMS Cup as guest driver and finished fifth in round 8 on his debut for the championship.

Thong also finished third in his debut visit to the Macau Grand Prix, racing in the Formula Masters China - Macau Grand Prix Invitational race 2013 with Eurasia Motorsports.

=== 2014 ===
Thong joined Team West-Tec for the 2014 Euroformula Open Championship and won the Winter Series which was held in Paul Ricard, having qualified on pole position and securing a race win with a fastest lap in the Copa Class Dallara F308 / Toyota at all the winter series races.

Thong later move to the main class featuring the Dallara F312 Chassis with Team West-Tec and finished the season with several top-ten results in his debut year in Formula 3. Thong graduated to the main class for the season driving the Dallara F312 / Toyota with Team West-Tec.

=== 2015 ===
In 2015, Thong was signed by Audi Sport Customer Racing Asia to be their first young driver development program talent and aim to promote young drivers to GT Racing. Thong participated in various championships including the inaugural season of the Audi Sport TT Cup, securing one win and two pole positions in Round 2 held in Norisring and became the only Chinese driver to win or score a pole position in this championship. Moreover, Thong also raced in the Blancpain Endurance Series driving the Audi R8 LMS Ultra for Phoenix Racing (Germany) alongside Marchy Lee and Markus Winkelhock.

Thong is also one of the drivers among the Audi Customer Racing Asia lineup that participated the 2015 24 Hours Nürburgring under a full Asian lineup for the first time, with Cheng Congfu, Marchy Lee and Alex Yoong completing the lineup. The full Asian team finishing 12th overall in the team's debut.

=== 2016 ===
Thong is the GT Asia Vice Champion in 2016. Thong and Phoenix Racing (Germany) entered the championship with the 2016 Audi R8 LMS GT3 and secured two wins and one pole position during the season with only three points shy from the overall title.

That same year, Thong also returned to the 24 Hours Nürburgring with the same lineup featuring Cheng Congfu, Marchy Lee and Alex Yoong with the New Audi R8 LMS GT3. However, the car retired after hitting technical issues.

From 2016 onwards, Thong joined GH Motorsports for the Asian Le Mans Series in the new LMP3 category with the Ligier JS P3. During the season, Thong and his team finished three times on the podium out of four races in total.

=== 2017 ===
Thong remained with Phoenix Racing (Germany) to participate in the inaugural season of the Blancpain GT Series Asia and scored two victories in Suzuka, Japan and Shanghai, China respectively. In addition with four other podium finishes in Sepang Malaysia, Buriram Thailand and Fuji Speedway in Japan. Thong and teammate Marchy Lee finished the season as the second runner up and at the same time crowned as the Silver Cup Champion.

Thong also drove for Audi Team Teda in the Audi R8 LMS Cup with Phoenix Racing (Germany) as a full season entry despite appeared several times as a guest driver in the past years. During the season, Thong finished four times on the podium including once in Sepang Malaysia, twice in Korea and another one in Zhejiang China. The Hong Kong driver came in fifth in the championship.

That same year, Thong returned to the 2017 - 2018 Asian Le Mans Series season with Taiwan Beer GH Motorsport from Taiwan in the LMP3 class. Thong and his teammate Hanss Lin 林帛亨 finished third in the LMP3 classification with three podiums out of four races including Zhuhai 4 Hours, Buriram 6 Hours and Sepang 4 Hours with a Ligier JS P3.

Thong made two guest appearances in 2017 with Audi Hong Kong by Phoenix Racing Asia at Round 3,4 Zhuahai International Circuit and Round.5,6 at Bangsaen Street Circuit in Thailand. Thong finished on the podium in both appearances.

=== 2018 ===
The year started with Thong joining fellow Hong Kong Drivers Marchy Lee, Darryl O'Young, Adderly Fong and Charles Kwan for the Dubai 24 Hour in a brand new Audi R8 LMS GT4 with Phoenix Racing (Germany). The Hong Kong outfit won the GT4 Class but was later penalised for pitstop infringement and dropped to second in class behind the other Phoenix Racing sister R8 LMS GT4.

The same year also saw Thong racing full season in Japan in the Super Taikyu Series with his usual crew Phoenix Racing (Germany) alongside Alex Yoong and Alex Au in the #82 Audi R8 LMS GT3. The No. 82 car led by Thong finished two times on the podium at the 3 Hours of Sugo and the 5 Hours of Autopolis before Thong and Yoong withdrew from the remaining two races of the championship to join Phoenix Racing (Germany) with two Brand New Bentley Continental GT3 at the final two rounds of Blancpain GT Series Asia, partnering South African driver Jordan Pepper.

=== 2019 ===
The Hong Kong driver returned to the Dubai 24 Hour with KC Motorgroup using a New Spec 2018 Nissan GT-R GT3 pairing with Tsugio Matsuda, Katsumasa Chiyo, Josh Burdon and Andrea Gagliardini. The #29 Nissan crew was running strong at sixth before suffering a mechanical failure that forced them to retired after 20 hours.

Thong made his debut in Japan's premier championship 2019 with Hong Kong outfit X Works Racing with a 2018 Nissan GT-R GT3. The team was equipped with Yokohama tires and finished four times in the points in their debut year at Round.2 Fuji Speedway, Round.4 Buriram Thailand, Round.7 Sugo and Round.8 Twin Ring Motegi. In 2019 X Works and their drivers became the first International entry in GT300 class to successfully score points in Super GT's history. Thong had two teammates over the season with Marchy Lee at the beginning of the season and Shinya Michimi for the second half of the season.

At the same year Thong also made two appearances in the Super Taikyu Series for the Round.3 Fuji 24 Hours and Round.5 5 Hours of Motegi alongside his current Super GT crew X Works Racing using the Audi R8 LMS GT3 in ST-X Class. The crew retired from the Fuji 24 Hours due to mechanical issues which was too severe for repair on spot. Thong rejoined at Round.5 in Twin Ring Motegi and qualified third for the 5 Hours race, in the end the No. 83 Audi crew won the 5 Hours of Motegi with Thong being the lead driver following by fellow Hong Kong drivers Smart Tse Ka Hing and Philip Tang. This victory marked the team's victory in the championship and also the first foreign team to win in Super Taikyu.

Thong made his Asian Le Mans Series return but this time with brand new team K2 Uchino in the premier LMP2 class running the Oreca 07/Gibson. K2 Uchino Racing is closely related to the 2018 Super GT GT300 champion team K2 Leon Racing. Thong and his teammate Haruki Kurosawa was the only LMP2 team that ran with two drivers, meaning Thong being the Silver classification driver will do 2/3 of the race distance. K2 Uchino Racing and Thong secured a podium finish at the season finale at the 4 Hours of Buriram, Thailand in just the team's third ever race in LMP2.

=== 2020 ===
Thong returned to Super GT and Super Taikyu Series with X Works Racing and new team Hirix Good Day Racing respectively. X Works Racing swapped from Nissan GT-R GT3 to the Audi R8 LMS EVO GT3 and remains on Yokohama Tires for their second season. However the season was considered the tougher one due to travel restrictions from the COVID-19 pandemic which cost the Hong Kong outfit to ran the season without their dedicated engineer and mechanics. Thong had several teammates throughout the season including 2005 GT300 Champion Kota Sasaki, Takuro Shinohara and Takeshi Kimura due to COVID-19 travel restrictions which led to Alex Au, Thong's planned teammate from Hong Kong being unable to enter Japan due to the closure of the Japanese border after the pandemic.

Thong is the 2020 Super Taikyu Series overall and ST-X (FIA GT3) champion. Thong returned to the championship with new formed Japanese team Hirix Good Day Racing with a 2020 Mercedes AMG GT3 EVO with Daisuke Yamawaki and 2019 2019 GT300 champion Shinichi Takagi. Due to the COVID-19 pandemic, the championship had rescheduled the calendar with the Fuji 24 Hours being the season Opener. The Hirix Racing crew won their debut race in the Fuji 24 Hours race in addition with Yuki Nemoto joining for the 24 Hours only and replacing Shinichi Takagi later in the season.

The No. 888 Hirix Racing AMG GT3 EVO came home as the 2020 Fuji Super Tec 24 Hours winner after completing 528 laps in total. Throughout the race the Hirix Racing outfit had a huge fire during one of their routine pitstops, however the car only suffered minor external damage and continued from then. The race was red flagged after torrential rain hit the circuit at night with seven hours into the race. The race continued after a three hours suspension once standing water was cleared and the track deemed safe to race again by the track marshals and race officials.

Round.2 Sugo saw the Hirix Racing crew and Thong finished second overall after starting the 3 Hours from Pole Position, the race was under full green condition even it was suffered from heavy rain throughout the whole race. After this race the #888 crew extended the championship lead at 60 points.

The following round at Okayama International Circuit saw the crew suffered from their only DNF of the season when Shinichi Takagi crashed on lap 9 of the 3 Hours of Okayama which left him a fractured back and wrist, resulting in Takagi withdrawing from the remaining races in both Super Taikyu Series and Super GT the same year. He later recovered and returns to the 2021 Super GT season. Yuki Nemoto replaced Takagi from Okayama onwards in the #888 Hirix Racing AMG GT3 Evo from then onwards.

Round.4 saw the Thong and the Hirix Racing outfit came home with their second win of the season, it also marked Thong's back to back win for the 5 Hours of Motegi after his victory with X Works Racing in 2019. Thong started the race after qualifying second from the grid, he was spun around by his competitor #9 Mp Racing on lap 2 but Thong later recovered and led the race from then onwards. Thong was also responsible for taking the checkered flag and concluded the team and his second win of the season. The second victory also further extended their championship lead.

Autopolis Circuit in Kyushu of Japan held the Round.5 and the No. 888 crew could possibly be crowned as champion if they won this race. Thong and his Hirix Racing team took the checkered flag fourth after suffering from a driver through penalty due to start infringement by his teammate. However, the championship lead was still under healthy margin. The final round at Suzuka was cancelled due to the announcement of the Japan state of Emergency due to the increasing COVID-19 cases around the country, hence only the first five rounds would be counted and from then onwards Thong and the #888 Hirix Good Day Racing crew as announced as the 2020 Super Taikyu Series Champion after securing two wins, another podium finish and a pole position.

== Racing record ==
(key) (Races in bold indicate pole position; results in italics indicate fastest lap)

=== Complete GT Asia Series results ===
Year	Team	Class	Car	1	2	3	4	5	6	7	8	9	10	11	12	Rank	Points
2016	Phoenix Racing Asia	GT3	Audi R8 LMS GT3	KOR; 5	KOR 4	CHA; 1	CHA; 11	OKA; 5	OKA; 1	FUJ; 11	FUJ; 9	SHA; 4	SHA; 5	SHA; 3	SHA; 2	2nd	126

=== Complete GT World Challenge Asia results ===
Year	Team	Class	Car	1	2	3	4	5	6	7	8	9	10	11	12	Rank	Points
2017	Phoenix Racing Asia	GT3	Audi R8 LMS GT3	SEP; 5	SEP; 3	CHA; 2	CHA; 2	SUZ; 1	SUZ; 14	FUJ; 17	FUJ; 3	SHA; 1	SHA; 5	ZHE; 4	ZHE; 6	3rd	158
2018	Phoenix Racing Asia	GT3	Audi R8 LMS GT3 Bentley GT3^{2}	SEP	SEP	CHA	CHA	SUZ; 9	SUZ; 8	FUJ; 7	FUJ; 10	SHA; Ret^{2}	SHA; 11^{2}	NIN; DNS^{2}	NIN; 5^{2}	25th	13
2022	Audi Sport Asia X Works	GT3	Audi R8 LMS EVO2 GT3	SEP; Ret	SEP; 8	SUZ; DNS	SUZ; DNS	FUJ; 7	FUJ; 8	SUG; 5	SUG; 19	OKA	OKA	MAN; C	MAN; C	18th	24

=== Complete Super Taikyu Series results ===
Year	Team	Class	Car	1	2	3	4	5	6	7	Rank	Points
2018	Phoenix Racing Asia	GT3 / ST-X	Audi R8 LMS GT3	SUZ; 4	SUG; 2	FUJ; Ret	AUT; 3	MOT	OKA	N/A	9th	19
2019	X Works	GT3 / ST-X	Audi R8 LMS GT3	SUZ	SUG	FUJ; Ret	AUT	MOT; 1	OKA	N/A	6th	31
2020	Hirix Racing	GT3 / ST-X	Mercedes AMG GT3 EVO	FUJ; 1	SUG 2	OKA; Ret	MOT; 1	AUT; 4	SUZ; C	N/A	1st	105
2021	AS Sport	GT4 / ST-Z	Audi R8 LMS GT4	MOT; 9	SUG; Ret	FUJ; 7	AUT	SUZ; 10	OKA; 5	N/A	11th	19.5
2022	HELM Motorsport Grid Motorsport^{2}	GT3 / ST-X	Nismo GT-R GT3 Mercedes AMG GT3 EVO ^{2}	SUZ	FUJ; 1	SUG	AUT	MOT; 1^{2}	OKA; 4^{2}	SUZ; 4^{2}	2nd	100
2023	HELM Motorsport	GT3 / ST-X	Nismo GT-R GT3	SUZ	FUJ 4	SUG	AUT	MOT	OKA	FUJ		

=== Complete Super GT Series results ===
Year	Team	Car	Class	Tires	1	2	3	4	5	6	7	8	Rank	Points
2019	X Works	Nismo GT-R GT3	GT300	Yokohama	OKA; Ret	FUJ; 7	SUZ; 28	CHA; 6	FUJ; 16	AUT; 19	SUG; 6	MOT; 8	20th	17
2020	X Works	Audi R8 LMS EVO	GT300	Yokohama	FUJ; 18	FUJ; Ret	SUZ; 24	MOT; 27	FUJ; 29	SUZ; 22	MOT; 20	FUJ; 16	N/A	0

=== Complete TCR Asia Series results ===
Year	Team	Class	Chassis	1	2	3	4	5	6	7	8	9	10	11	12	Rank	Points
2017	Audi Hong Kong	TCR	Audi RS3 LMS SEQ	SEP	SEP	ZHU	ZHU	ZHU; Ret ^{5}	ZHU; 3	BNG; 6^{3}	BNG; 6	SHA	SHA	ZHE	ZHE	10th	40

=== Complete TCR Taiwan Series results ===
Year	Team	Class	Chassis	1	2	3	4	Rank	Points
2023	GH-Team AAI	TCR	Honda Civic FK7 TCR	LIH 1	LIH	LIH 1	LIH 1	2nd	47

=== Complete Asian Le Mans Series results ===
Year	Team	Car	Class	1	2	3	4	Rank	Pts
2013	OAK Racing	Morgan LMP2	LMP2	INJ	FUJ	ZHU 1	SEP	7th	26
2016-17	G-Print by Triple 1 Racing	Ligier JS P3	LMP3	ZHU	FUJ; Ret	CHA; 3	SEP; 2	7th	33
2017-18	Taiwan Beer GH Motorsport	Ligier JS P3	LMP3	ZHU; 2	FUJ; Ret	CHA	SEP; 2	7th	36
2019-20	K2 Uchino Racing	Oreca 07	LMP2	SHA; Ret	BEN	SEP; 4	CHA; 3	6th	27
2022	Konrad Motorsport	Ginetta G61-LT-P3	LMP3	DUB; 8	DUB; Ret	YAS; 7	YAS; Ret	11th	10

=== Complete European Le Mans Series results ===
Year	Team	Class	Chassis	1	2	3	4	5	6	Rank	Points
2021	JMW Motorsport	LMGTE	Ferrai 488 GTE EVO	CAT	RBR	LEC	MNZ	SPA	ALG; 6	21st	8

=== Complete Michelin Le Mans Cup results ===
Year	Team	Class	Chassis	1	2	3	4	5	6	Rank	Points
2022	CD Sport	LMP3	Ligier JS P320	LEC; 7	IMO	LMS	LMS	SPA	ALG	25th	6

=== Complete Protyre Formula Renault Championship results ===
Year	Team	Car	1	2	3	4	5	6	7	8	9	10	11	12	13	14	15	16	Rank	Points
2013	Fortec Motorsport	Tatuus FR2000	DON; Ret	DON; DNS	SNE; 13	SNE; 9	SNE; 10	THR; Ret	THR; Ret	THR; Ret	CRO; 5	CRO; 14	CRO; Ret	ROC; 11	ROC; 5	ROC; Ret	SIL; 14	SIL; **5**	16th	117

=== Complete Euroformula Open Championship results ===
Year	Team	Car	1	2	3	4	5	6	7	8	9	10	11	12	13	14	15	16	Rank	Points
2014	Team West-Tec	Dallara F312	NÜR; 10	NÜR; 10	ALG; 9	ALG; 11	JER; 13	JER; 8	HUN; 8	HUN; Ret	SIL; 8	SIL; Ret	SPA; Ret	SPA; 12	MNZ; 17	MNZ; Ret	CAT; 15	CAT; 17	18th	16

=== Complete TCR Asia Challenge results ===
(key) (Races in bold indicate pole position) (Races in italics indicate fastest lap)

Year	Team	Car	1	2	DC	Points
2023	Team TRC	Honda FK7 TCR	MAC; 1 Ret	MAC; 2; 1	4th	30
