= 2024 TCR Taiwan Series =

The 2024 TCR Taiwan Series, officially called the TCR Chinese Taipei Series, is the third season of the TCR Taiwan Series. All rounds are to be held at the same venue, Lihpao Racing Park, and started on 27 April 2024 and is set to end on 3 November 2023. Each race lasts 15 laps for Round 1 and 2. The racing laps had been reduced to 12 laps for Round 3 and 4 for safety concerns.

== Calendar ==
Round	Circuit	Date
1	(Taiwan) Lihpao Racing Park	27–28 April
2	(Taiwan) Lihpao Racing Park	29–30 June
3	(Taiwan) Lihpao Racing Park	31 August–1 September
4	(Taiwan) Lihpao Racing Park	2–3 November

== Entries ==
Team	Car	No.	Drivers	Class	Rounds
(Taiwan) BC Racing	Alfa Romeo Giulietta Veloce TCR	4	(Taiwan) Liao Chun-Hao	A	1
(Taiwan) BC Racing	Honda Civic FL5 TCR	51	(Taiwan) Liao Chun-Hao	A	2–3
(Taiwan) BC Racing	Honda Civic FL5 TCR	11	(Taiwan) Huang Chun-Chih	A	1–3
(Taiwan) Border Team	Honda Civic FK7 TCR	75	(Taiwan) Yu Yi-Hao	A	1–3
(Taiwan) Border Team	Cupra TCR DSG	76	(Taiwan) Huang Szu-Chia	B	1–2
(Taiwan) Border Team	Honda Civic FK2 TCR	76	(Taiwan) Huang Szu-Chia	B	3
(Taiwan) Liming Racing	Honda Civic FK7 TCR	89	(Taiwan) Kao Tzu-Lung	A	1–2
(Taiwan) Liming Racing	Honda Civic FL5 TCR	89	(Taiwan) Kao Tzu-Lung	A	3
(Taiwan) Liming Racing	Honda Civic FK7 TCR	9	(Taiwan) Chen Kuo-Ping	B	2
(Taiwan) Liming Racing	Honda Civic FL5 TCR	69	(Taiwan) Wu Yi-Chan	B	2–3
(Taiwan) Surpass x Bulls Motor	Honda Civic FK7 TCR	22	(Taiwan) Huang Hsi-Chan	A	3
(Taiwan) Team AAI	Honda Civic FK7 TCR	91	(Taiwan) Shih Shih-Wei	A	1–3
(Taiwan) Team Tien x Opium	VW Golf GTI TCR SEQ	59	(Taiwan) Liang Wen-Chun	B	1
(Taiwan) Team Tien x Opium	VW Golf GTI TCR SEQ	59	(Taiwan) Liang Wen-Chun	C	2–3
(Taiwan) YSRT	Audi RS3 LMS SEQ	1	(Taiwan) Huang Hsin-Hsiang	C	2–3
(Taiwan) Yu Speed	Audi RS3 LMS SEQ	96	(Taiwan) Chuang Yi-Feng	C	2
(Taiwan) Yu Speed	Audi RS3 LMS DSG	99	(Taiwan) Huang Hsun	C	2–3
(Taiwan) Zuver	Audi RS3 LMS SEQ	57	(Taiwan) Lee Cheng-Yu	B	2

Icon	Class
A	Class A
B	Class B
C	Class C

== Results and standings ==
=== Season summary ===
Rnd.	Race	Circuit	Class A Winners	Class B Winners	Class C Winners	Ref.
1	1	(Taiwan) Lihpao	(Taiwan) No. 91 Team AAI	(Taiwan) No. 76 Border Team	(Taiwan) Harmony Racing	
1	1	(Taiwan) Lihpao	(Taiwan) Shih Shih-Wei	(Taiwan) Huang Szu-Chia	(China) Song Jiaju-Fan	
1	2	(Taiwan) Lihpao	(Taiwan) No. 89 Liming Racing	(Taiwan) No. 76 Border Team	(Taiwan) Harmony Racing	
1	2	(Taiwan) Lihpao	(Taiwan) Kao Tzu-Lung	(Taiwan) Huang Szu-Chia	(China) Song Jiaju-Fan	
2	1	(Taiwan) Lihpao	(Taiwan) No. 75 Border Team	(Taiwan) No. 69 Liming Racing	(Taiwan) No. 59 Team Tien x Opium	
2	1	(Taiwan) Lihpao	(Taiwan) Yu Yi-Hao	(Taiwan) Wu Yi-Chan	(Taiwan) Liang Wen-Chun	
2	2	(Taiwan) Lihpao	(Taiwan) No. 89 Liming Racing	(Taiwan) No.9 Liming Racing	(Taiwan) No. 99 Yu Speed	
2	2	(Taiwan) Lihpao	(Taiwan) Kao Tzu-Lung	(Taiwan) Chen Kuo-Ping	(Taiwan) Huang Hsun	
3	1	(Taiwan) Lihpao	(Taiwan) No. 89 Liming Racing	(Taiwan) No. 69 Liming Racing	(Taiwan) No. 99 Yu Speed	
3	1	(Taiwan) Lihpao	(Taiwan) Kao Tzu-Lung	(Taiwan) Wu Yi-Chan	(Taiwan) Huang Hsun	
3	2	(Taiwan) Lihpao	(Taiwan) No. 89 Liming Racing	(Taiwan) No. 69 Liming Racing	(Taiwan) No. 59 Team Tien x Opium	
3	2	(Taiwan) Lihpao	(Taiwan) Kao Tzu-Lung	(Taiwan) Wu Yi-Chan	(Taiwan) Liang Wen-Chun	
4	1	(Taiwan) Lihpao	(Taiwan) No. 91 Team AAI	(Taiwan) No.9 Liming Racing	(Taiwan) No. 59 Team Tien x Opium	
4	1	(Taiwan) Lihpao	(Taiwan) Shih Shih-Wei	(Taiwan) Chen Kuo-Ping	(Taiwan) Liang Wen-Chun	
4	2	(Taiwan) Lihpao	(Taiwan) No. 91 Team AAI	(Taiwan) No.9 Liming Racing	(Taiwan) No. 59 Team Tien x Opium	
4	2	(Taiwan) Lihpao	(Taiwan) Shih Shih-Wei	(Taiwan) Chen Kuo-Ping	(Taiwan) Liang Wen-Chun	

=== Drivers' Championship ===
Points systems
	1st	2nd	3rd	4th	5th
Qualifying	3	2	1		
Fastest lap	1				
Race	12	8	5	3	1

==== Class A ====
(Races in bold indicate pole position; results in italics indicate fastest lap)

Pos.	Driver	Team	LIH1 (Taiwan)		LIH2 (Taiwan)		LIH3 (Taiwan)		LIH4 (Taiwan)		Points
Pos.	Driver	Team	RD1	RD2	RD1	RD2	RD1	RD2	RD1	RD2	Points
1	(Taiwan) Kao Tzu-Lung	(Taiwan) Liming Racing	3	1	**2**	1	1	1	**2**	2	87
2	(Taiwan) Shih Shih-Wei	(Taiwan) Team AAI	1	4	3	2	2	2	1	1	77
3	(Taiwan) Yu Yi-Hao	(Taiwan) Border Team	Ret	3	1	3	**3**	3	DSQ	3	45
4	(Taiwan) Huang Chun-Chih	(Taiwan) BC Racing	**2**	2	DNS	DNS	DNS	DNS			21
5	(Japan) Kaito Sekino	(Taiwan) YSRT							3	4	8
6	(Taiwan) Huang Hsi-Chan	(Taiwan) Surpass x Bulls Motor					4	4			6
7	(Malaysia) Helmi Azman	(Taiwan) Surpass x Bulls Motor							4	DNS	3
8	(Indonesia) Wilman Hammar	(Taiwan) Team Tien x Opium	4	DNQ							3
9	(Taiwan) Liao Chun-Hao	(Taiwan) BC Racing	Ret	5	DNS	DNS	DNS	DNS			1
10	(China) Yuanhang Chen	(Taiwan) Team AAI					5	Ret			1
11	(Taiwan) Wan Kai-Hei	(Taiwan) Zuver							Ret	Ret	0

==== Class B ====
Pos.	Driver	Team	LIH1 (Taiwan)		LIH2 (Taiwan)		LIH3 (Taiwan)		LIH4 (Taiwan)		Points
Pos.	Driver	Team	RD1	RD2	RD1	RD2	RD1	RD2	RD1	RD2	Points
1	(Taiwan) Wu Yi-Chan	(Taiwan) Liming Racing			**1**	2	**1**	1	**1**	1	82
2	(Taiwan) Huang Szu-Chia	(Taiwan) Border Team	**1**	1	Ret	3	2	2			53
3	(Taiwan) Chen Kuo-Ping	(Taiwan) Liming Racing			2	1			2	2	41
4	(Japan) Takuma Kunimine	(Taiwan) Uno Racing Team							3	3	10
5	(Taiwan) Zun Lin-Tsun	(Taiwan) Uno Racing Team							4	Ret	3
6	(Taiwan) Lee Cheng-Yu	(Taiwan) Zuver			DNS	DNS	Ret	Ret			0
7	(Taiwan) Liang Wen-Chun	(Taiwan) Team Tien x Opium	DNS	DNS							0

==== Class C ====
Pos.	Driver	Team	LIH1 (Taiwan)		LIH2 (Taiwan)		LIH3 (Taiwan)		LIH4 (Taiwan)		Points
Pos.	Driver	Team	RD1	RD2	RD1	RD2	RD1	RD2	RD1	RD2	Points
1	(Taiwan) Liang Wen-Chun	(Taiwan) Team Tien x Opium	DNS	DNS	**1**	2	2	1	**1**	1	76
2	(Taiwan) Huang Hsun	(Taiwan) Yu Speed			2	1	**1**	2	2	2	65
3	(Taiwan) Huang Hsin-Hsiang	(Taiwan) YSRT			4	4	3	3	3	3	27
4	(China) Song Jiaju-Fan	(Taiwan) Harmony Racing	1	1							24
5	(Taiwan) Chuang Yi-Feng	(Taiwan) Yu Speed			3	3			Ret	DNS	11
6	(China) Xu Zhefeng	(China) Team KRC					4	4			6
7	(Thailand) Muklada Sarapuech	(Taiwan) Harmony Racing							4	Ret	3
8	(China) Ruan Cunfan	(China) Team KRC							Wth	4	3

Colour	Result
Gold	Winner
Silver	Second place
Bronze	Third place
Green	Points classification
Blue	Non-points classification
Blue	Non-classified finish (NC)
Purple	Retired, not classified (Ret)
Red	Did not qualify (DNQ)
Red	Did not pre-qualify (DNPQ)
Black	Disqualified (DSQ)
White	Did not start (DNS)
White	Withdrew (WD)
White	Race cancelled (C)
Blank	Did not practice (DNP)
Blank	Did not arrive (DNA)
Blank	Excluded (EX)

=== Teams' Championship ===
Pos.	Team	LIH1 (Taiwan)		LIH2 (Taiwan)		LIH3 (Taiwan)		LIH4 (Taiwan)		Points
Pos.	Team	RD1	RD2	RD1	RD2	RD1	RD2	RD1	RD2	Points
1	(Taiwan) Liming Racing	7	12	27	24	30	25	32	29	186
3	(Taiwan) Border Team	12	17	15	10	16	14	1	5	90
3	(Taiwan) Team AAI	13	3	7	9	10	8	14	13	77
4	(Taiwan) Team Tien x Opium	0	0	15	9	10	13	16	13	76
5	(Taiwan) Yu Speed	0	0	17	17	16	8	9	8	75
6	(Taiwan) YSRT	0	0	3	3	6	5	12	8	37
7	(Taiwan) BC Racing	12	10	0	0	0	0	0	0	22
8	(Taiwan) Uno Racing Team	0	0	0	0	0	0	9	5	14
9	(Taiwan) Surpass x Bulls Motor	0	0	0	0	3	3	3	0	9
10	(Taiwan) Harmony Racing	0	0	0	0	0	0	3	0	3
11	(China) Team KRC	0	0	0	0	3	3	0	3	3
12	(Taiwan) Zuver	0	0	0	0	0	0	0	0	0
