= 2022 TCR Taiwan Series =

The 2022 TCR Taiwan Series, officially called the TCR Chinese Taipei Series, was the first season of the TCR Taiwan Series. All rounds are to be held at the same venue, Lihpao Racing Park, and started on 29 April 2022 and is set to end on 30 October 2022. Each race lasts one hour.

== Entry list ==
Team	Car	No.	Drivers	Class	Rounds
(Taiwan) Carsman Racing	Honda Civic Type R TCR (FK8)	11	(Taiwan) Luo Tianyi	B	2
(Taiwan) Carsman Racing	Honda Civic Type R TCR (FK8)	11	(Taiwan) Li Yuquan	B	2
(Taiwan) Carsman Racing	Honda Civic Type R TCR (FK8)	22	(Taiwan) Li Yanhan	A	1
(Taiwan) Carsman Racing	Honda Civic Type R TCR (FK8)	22	(Taiwan) Weng Zhiyuan	A	1
(Taiwan) FIST-Team AAI	Honda Civic Type R TCR (FK8)	15	(Taiwan) Chen Junhua	A	1–3
(Taiwan) FIST-Team AAI	Honda Civic Type R TCR (FK8)	15	(Taiwan) Liu Weizhi	A	1–3
(Taiwan) FIST-Team AAI	Honda Civic Type R TCR (FK8)	91	(Taiwan) Li Yongde	A	3
(Taiwan) FIST-Team AAI	Honda Civic Type R TCR (FK8)	91	(Taiwan) Huang Xizhan	A	3
(Taiwan) HubAuto Racing	Audi RS 3 LMS TCR (2021)	19	(Taiwan) Chen Hancheng	A	1–2
(Taiwan) HubAuto Racing	Audi RS 3 LMS TCR (2021)	19	(New Zealand) Jonathan Lester	A	1–2
(Taiwan) YSR Motorsport	Volkswagen Golf GTI TCR	21	(Taiwan) Feng Renzhi	A	2
(Taiwan) YSR Motorsport	Volkswagen Golf GTI TCR	21	(Taiwan) Yuan Shengping	A	2-3
(Taiwan) YSR Motorsport	Volkswagen Golf GTI TCR	21	(Taiwan) Weng Zhiyuan	A	3
(Taiwan) Armor Team	CUPRA León TCR	26	(Taiwan) Zhuang Jishun	B	1,3
(Taiwan) Armor Team	CUPRA León TCR	26	(Taiwan) Cai Zhangda	B	1,3
(Taiwan) Triple S Team	Volkswagen Golf GTI TCR	35	(Taiwan) Su Jianhua	B	1–3
(Taiwan) Triple S Team	Volkswagen Golf GTI TCR	35	(Taiwan) Liang Wenyao	B	1–3
(Taiwan) Speed Verse Racing Academy	Audi RS 3 LMS TCR (2021)	52	(Taiwan) Dai Xiaoxiang	A	1–3
(Taiwan) Speed Verse Racing Academy	Audi RS 3 LMS TCR (2021)	52	(Taiwan) Lin Yuanhu	A	1-2
(Taiwan) Speed Verse Racing Academy	Audi RS 3 LMS TCR (2021)	52	(Taiwan) Yao Yuanhao	A	3
(Taiwan) Speed Verse Racing Academy	Audi RS 3 LMS TCR (2017)	85	(Taiwan) Gao Jiahong	B	1–3
(Taiwan) Speed Verse Racing Academy	Audi RS 3 LMS TCR (2017)	85	(Taiwan) Lin Zenghan	B	1
(Taiwan) Speed Verse Racing Academy	Audi RS 3 LMS TCR (2017)	85	(Taiwan) Zhou Annian	B	3
(Taiwan) Speed Verse Racing Academy	Honda Civic Type R TCR (FK8)	99	(Taiwan) Yao Yuanhao	A	1–2
(Taiwan) Speed Verse Racing Academy	Honda Civic Type R TCR (FK8)	99	(Taiwan) Lai Judong	A	1
(Taiwan) Speed Verse Racing Academy	Honda Civic Type R TCR (FK8)	99	(Taiwan) Lin Zenghan	A	2
(Taiwan) Speed Verse Racing Academy	Honda Civic Type R TCR (FK8)	99	(Taiwan) Yang Chaosheng	A	3
(Taiwan) Speed Verse Racing Academy	Honda Civic Type R TCR (FK8)	99	(Taiwan) Yang Ziqing	A	3
(Taiwan) Team Tianshi ZUVER	Audi RS 3 LMS TCR (2017)	57	(Taiwan) Lee Chengyou	B	3
(Taiwan) Team Tianshi ZUVER	Audi RS 3 LMS TCR (2017)	57	(Taiwan) Cai Yuxuan	B	3
(Taiwan) BORDER Team	Audi RS 3 LMS TCR (2017)	67	(Taiwan) Wang Shengsa	B	3
(Taiwan) BORDER Team	Audi RS 3 LMS TCR (2017)	67	(Taiwan) Liao Dingfu	B	3
(Taiwan) BORDER Team	Honda Civic Type R TCR (FK2)	75	(Taiwan) Huang Jianye	A	1–3
(Taiwan) BORDER Team	Honda Civic Type R TCR (FK2)	75	(Taiwan) You Yihao	A	1–3
(Taiwan) BORDER Team	SEAT León TCR	76	(Taiwan) Zhang Jiawei	B	1–3
(Taiwan) BORDER Team	SEAT León TCR	76	(Taiwan) Huang Sijia	B	1–3
(Taiwan) Motul 300V	Honda Civic Type R TCR (FK8)	77	(Taiwan) Yang Mengqiao	A	2-3
(Taiwan) Motul 300V	Honda Civic Type R TCR (FK8)	77	(Taiwan) Wang Shangyuan	A	2-3
(Taiwan) DRS K-Sport	Honda Civic Type R TCR (FK8)	78	(Taiwan) Lin Qiyi	B	1
(Taiwan) DRS K-Sport	Honda Civic Type R TCR (FK8)	78	(Taiwan) Chen Wuwei	B	1
(Taiwan) GO Racing	Honda Civic Type R TCR (FK8)	88	(Taiwan) Zhu Jiawei	A	1–2
(Taiwan) GO Racing	Honda Civic Type R TCR (FK8)	88	(Taiwan) Li Yongde	A	1–2

Icon	Class
A	Class A
B	Class B

=== Calendar ===
Round	Circuit	Date
1	(Taiwan) Lihpao Racing Park	29 April–1 May
2	(Taiwan) Lihpao Racing Park	24–26 June
3	(Taiwan) Lihpao Racing Park	19–21 August
4	(Taiwan) Lihpao Racing Park	28–30 October

== Results ==
Race	Circuit	Class A			Class B		
Race	Circuit	Class A Pole Position	Class A Winners	Class A Fastest Lap	Class B Pole Position	Class B Winners	Class B Fastest Lap
1	(Taiwan) Lihpao Racing Park	(Taiwan) No. 15 FIST-Team AAI	(Taiwan) No. 15 FIST-Team AAI	(Taiwan) No. 19 HubAuto Racing	(Taiwan) No. 26 Armor Team	(Taiwan) No. 85 Speed Verse Racing Academy	(Taiwan) No. 26 Armor Team
1	(Taiwan) Lihpao Racing Park	(Taiwan) Chen Junhua (Taiwan) Liu Weizhi	(Taiwan) Chen Junhua (Taiwan) Liu Weizhi	(Taiwan) Chen Hancheng (New Zealand) Jonathan Lester	(Taiwan) Zhuang Jishun (Taiwan) Cai Zhangda	(Taiwan) Gao Jiahong (Taiwan) Lin Zenghan	(Taiwan) Zhuang Jishun (Taiwan) Cai Zhangda
2	(Taiwan) Lihpao Racing Park	(Taiwan) No. 19 HubAuto Racing	(Taiwan) No. 15 FIST-Team AAI	(Taiwan) No. 19 HubAuto Racing	(Taiwan) No. 26 Armor Team	(Taiwan) No. 26 Armor Team	(Taiwan) No. 26 Armor Team
2	(Taiwan) Lihpao Racing Park	(Taiwan) Chen Hancheng (New Zealand) Jonathan Lester	(Taiwan) Chen Junhua (Taiwan) Liu Weizhi	(Taiwan) Chen Hancheng (New Zealand) Jonathan Lester	(Taiwan) Zhuang Jishun (Taiwan) Cai Zhangda	(Taiwan) Zhuang Jishun (Taiwan) Cai Zhangda	(Taiwan) Zhuang Jishun (Taiwan) Cai Zhangda
3	(Taiwan) Lihpao Racing Park	(Taiwan) No. 15 FIST-Team AAI	(Taiwan) No. 91 FIST-Team AAI	(Taiwan) No. 91 FIST-Team AAI	(Taiwan) No. 26 Armor Team	(Taiwan) No. 85 Speed Verse Racing Academy	(Taiwan) No. 26 Armor Team
3	(Taiwan) Lihpao Racing Park	(Taiwan) Chen Junhua (Taiwan) Liu Weizhi	(Taiwan) Huang Xizhan (Taiwan) Li Yongde	(Taiwan) Huang Xizhan (Taiwan) Li Yongde	(Taiwan) Zhuang Jishun (Taiwan) Cai Zhangda	(Taiwan) Zhou Annian (Taiwan) Gao Jiahong	(Taiwan) Zhuang Jishun (Taiwan) Cai Zhangda
4	(Taiwan) Lihpao Racing Park						

== Championship Standings ==
Scoring system

There were two different point systems used depending on the driver's class.

Position	**1st**	**2nd**	**3rd**	**4th**	**5th**	**6th**	**7th**
Class A	15	10	8	6	4	2	1
Class B	12	8	6	4	2	1	

=== Drivers' Championship ===
Pos.	Driver	LIH1	LIH2	LIH3	LIH4	Pts.
Class A
1	(Taiwan) Chen Junhua (Taiwan) Liu Weizhi	**1**	1	**Ret**		30
2	(Taiwan) Dai Xiaoxiang	3	3	8		20
3	(Taiwan) Huang Jianye (Taiwan) You Yihao	6	2	4		20
4	(Taiwan) Chen Hancheng (New Zealand) Jonathan Lester	2	**4**			16
5	(Taiwan) Weng Zhiyuan	4		2		16
6	(Taiwan) Lin Yuanhu	3	3			16
7	(Taiwan) Huang Xizhan			1		15
8	(Taiwan) Li Yongde	Ret	Ret	1		15
9	(Taiwan) Yuan Shengping		9	2		10
10	(Taiwan) Wang Shangyuan (Taiwan) Yang Mengqiao		6	3		10
11	(Taiwan) Yao Yuanhao	9†	5	8		10
12	(Taiwan) Li Yanhan	4				6
13	(Taiwan) Lin Zenghan		5			4
14	(Taiwan) Lai Judong	9†				2
15	(Taiwan) Feng Renzhi		9			1
16	(Taiwan) Zhu Jiawei	Ret	Ret			0
17	(Taiwan) Yang Chaosheng (Taiwan) Yang Ziqing			DNS		0
Class B
1	(Taiwan) Gao Jiahong	5	11	5		28
2	(Taiwan) Huang Sijia (Taiwan) Zhang Jiawei	8	10	7		18
3	(Taiwan) Liang Wenyao (Taiwan) Su Jianhua	7	8	Ret		16
4	(Taiwan) Lin Zenghan	5				12
5	(Taiwan) Zhou Annian			5		12
6	(Taiwan) Cai Zhangda (Taiwan) Zhuang Jishun	**Ret**	**7**	**Ret**		12
7	(Taiwan) Lee Chengyou (Taiwan) Cai Yuxuan			6		8
8	(Taiwan) Li Yuquan (Taiwan) Luo Tianyi		Ret			0
9	(Taiwan) Wang Shengsa (Taiwan) Liao Dingfu			Ret		0
10	(Taiwan) Chen Wuwei (Taiwan) Lin Qiyi	DSQ				0
Pos.	Driver	LIH1	LIH2	LIH3	LIH4	Pts.

Colour	Result
Gold	Winner
Silver	Second place
Bronze	Third place
Green	Points classification
Blue	Non-points classification
Blue	Non-classified finish (NC)
Purple	Retired, not classified (Ret)
Red	Did not qualify (DNQ)
Red	Did not pre-qualify (DNPQ)
Black	Disqualified (DSQ)
White	Did not start (DNS)
White	Withdrew (WD)
White	Race cancelled (C)
Blank	Did not practice (DNP)
Blank	Did not arrive (DNA)
Blank	Excluded (EX)

**Bold** – PoleItalics – Fastest Lap
