= 2015 Australian GT Championship =

Motor racing competition

Seasons
- ← 2014 2016 →

The 2015 Australian GT Championship was an Australian motor racing competition open to FIA GT3 cars and similar approved vehicles. It was sanctioned by the Confederation of Australian Motor Sport (CAMS) as National Championship, with the Australian GT Sportscar Group Pty Ltd appointed by CAMS as the Category Manager.

The GT Championship title, which was the 19th Australian GT Championship, was won by Christopher Mies, driving an Audi R8 Ultra.

== Race calendar ==
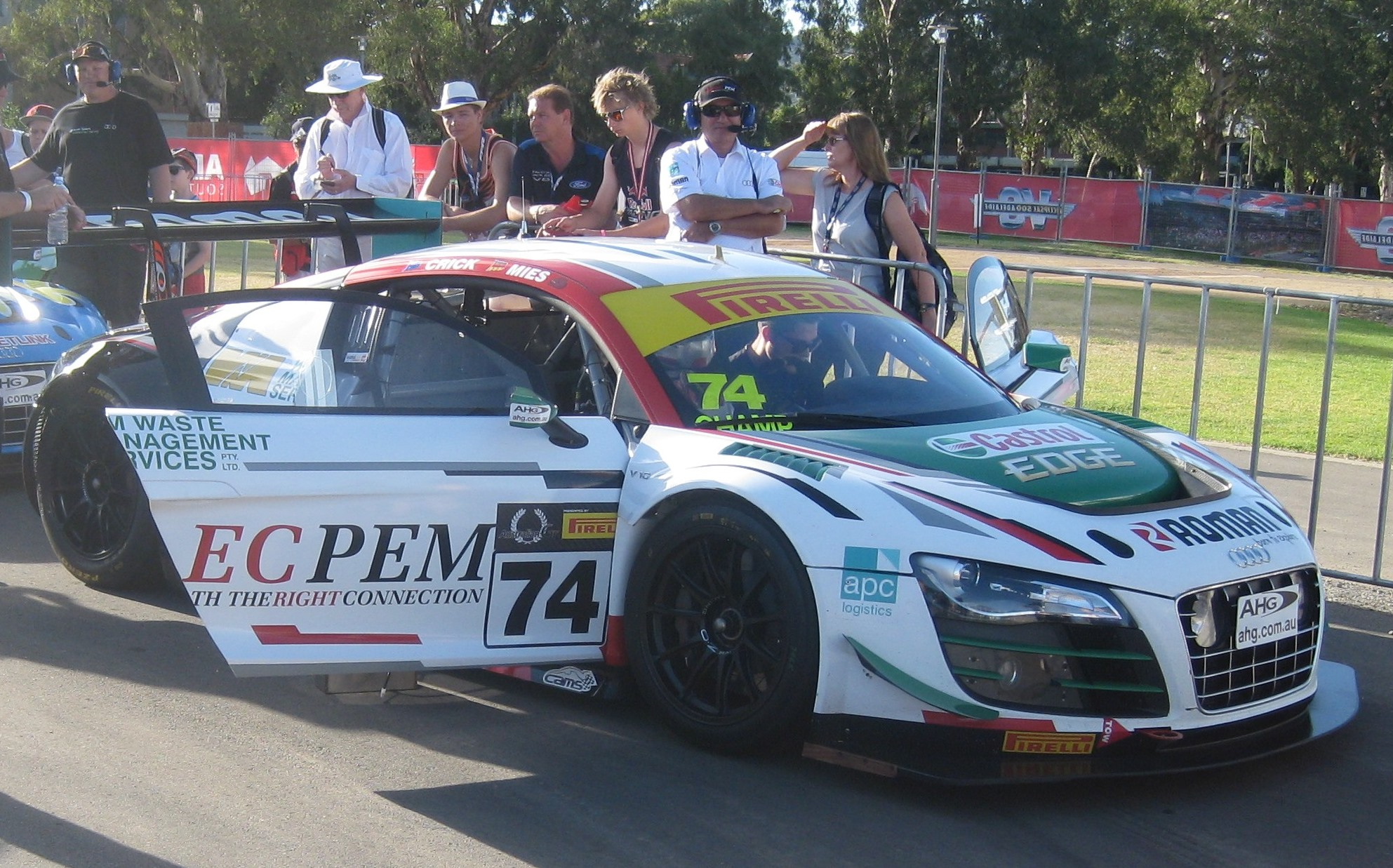
Christopher Mies won the Championship driving an Audi R8 Ultra

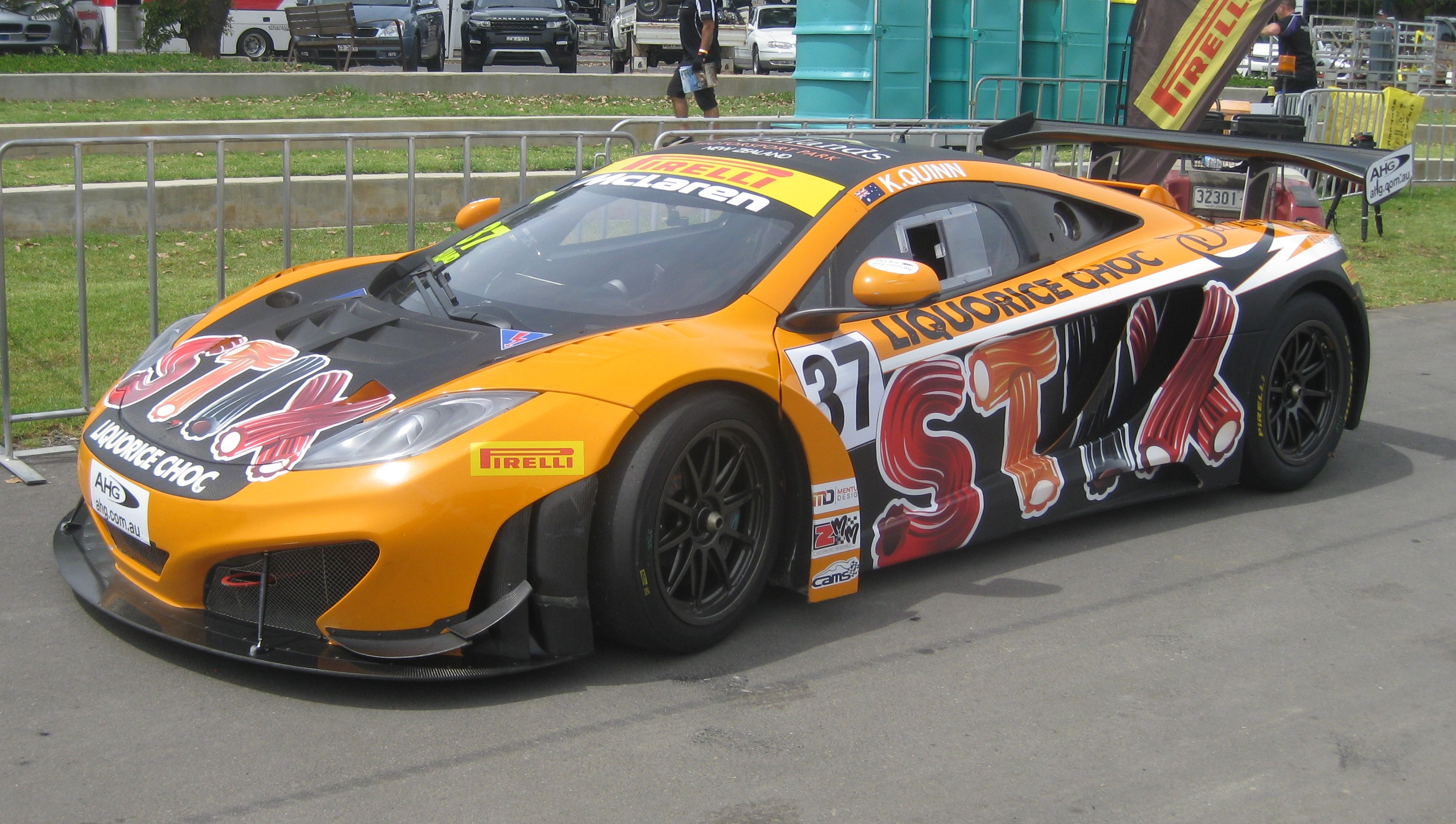
Klark Quinn placed third driving a McLaren MP4-12C (pictured) and a McLaren 650S GT3

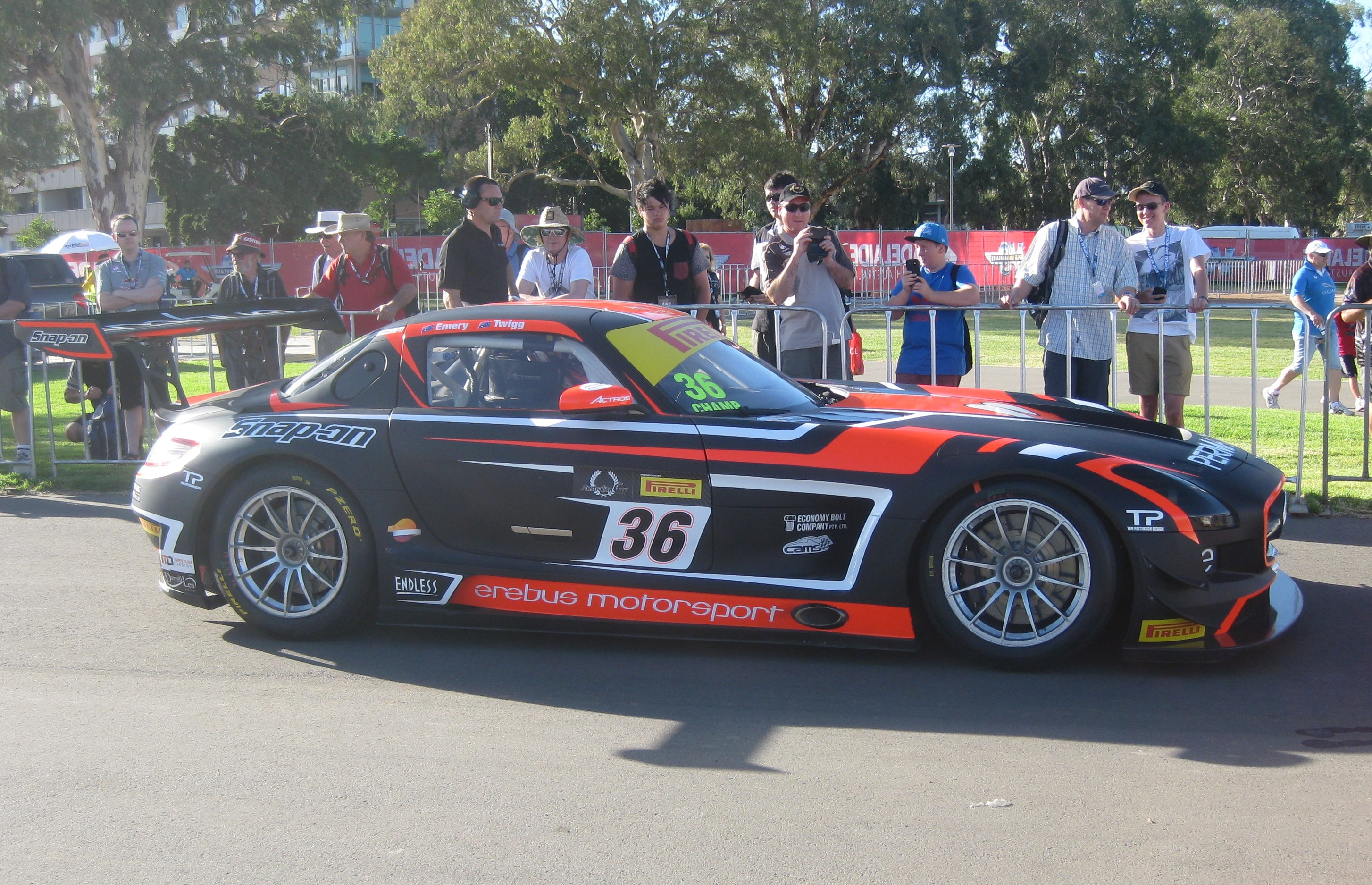
Max Twigg placed ninth in a Mercedes-Benz SLS AMG GT3

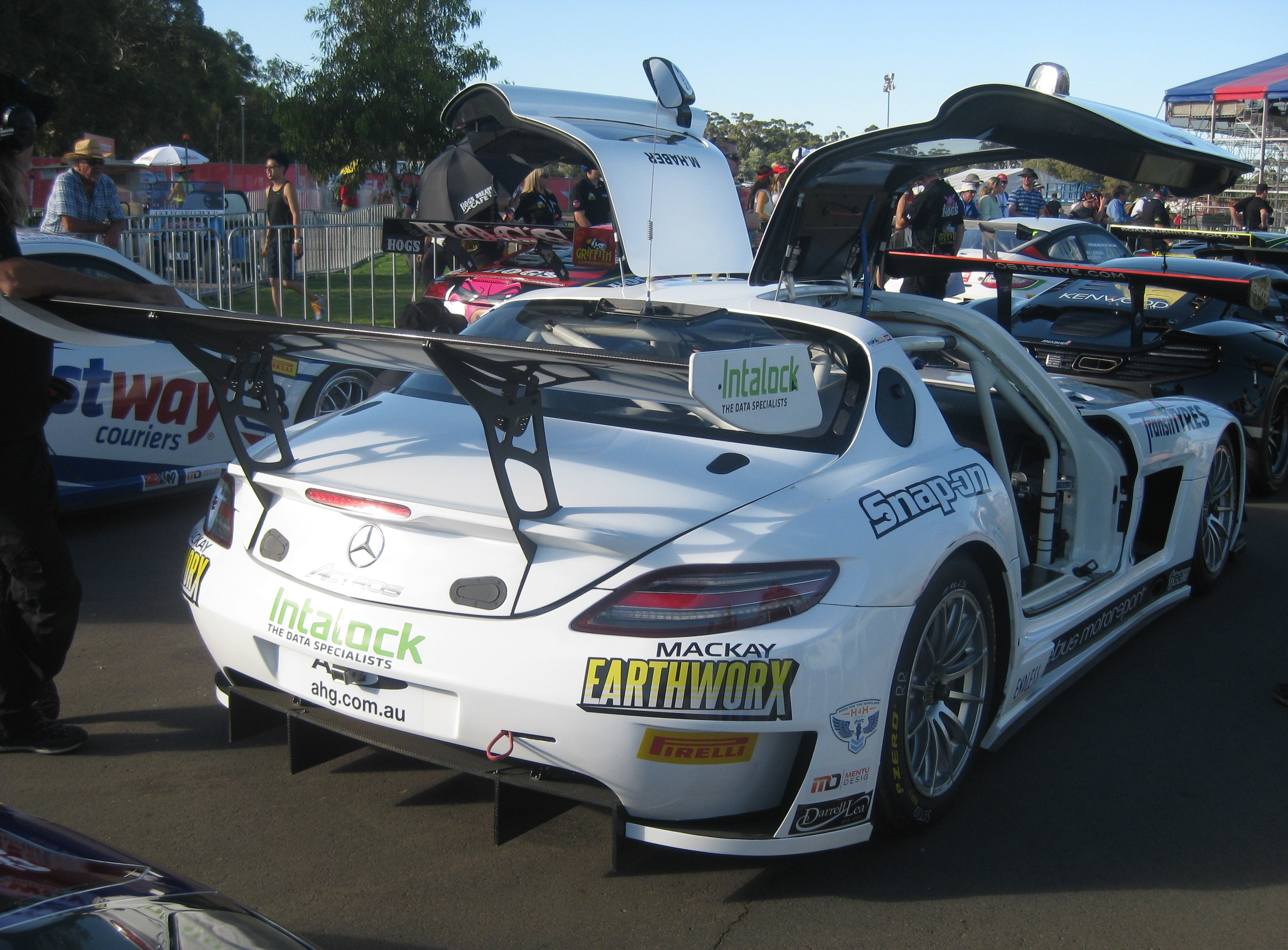
Morgan Haber placed 13th in a Mercedes-Benz SLS AMG GT3

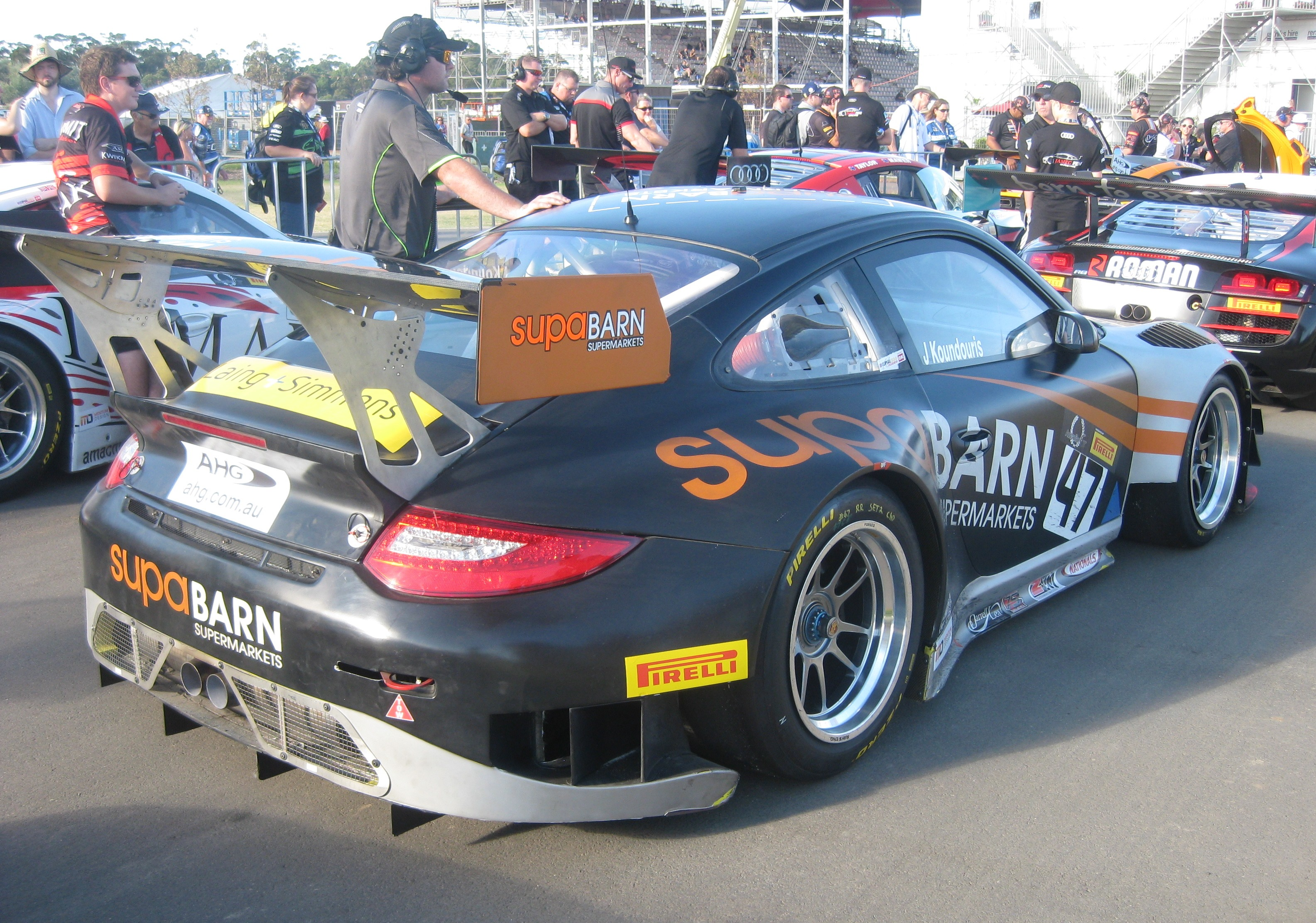
James Koundouris placed 14th in a Porsche 911 GT3-R

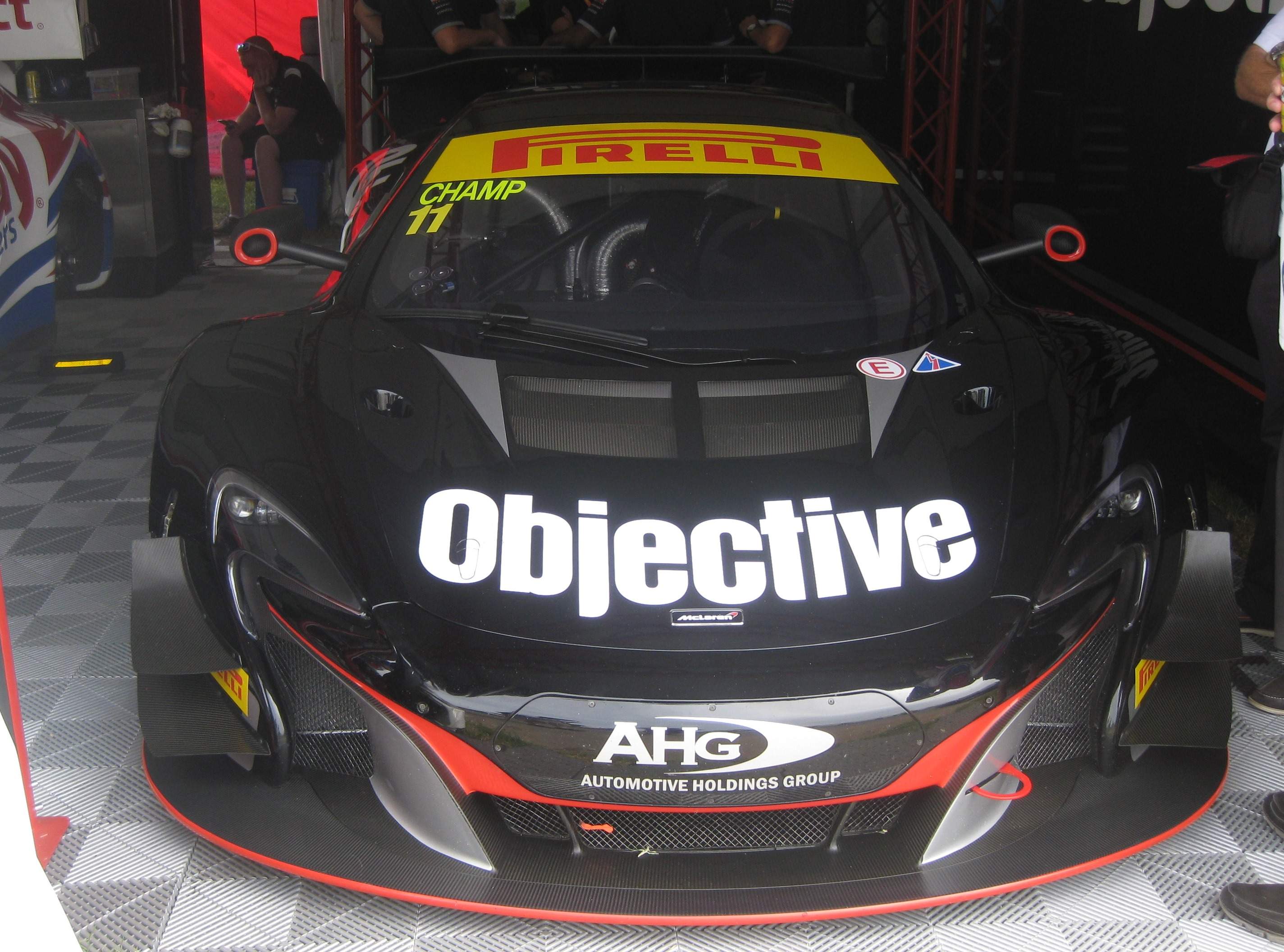
Tony Walls placed 15th in a McLaren 650S GT3

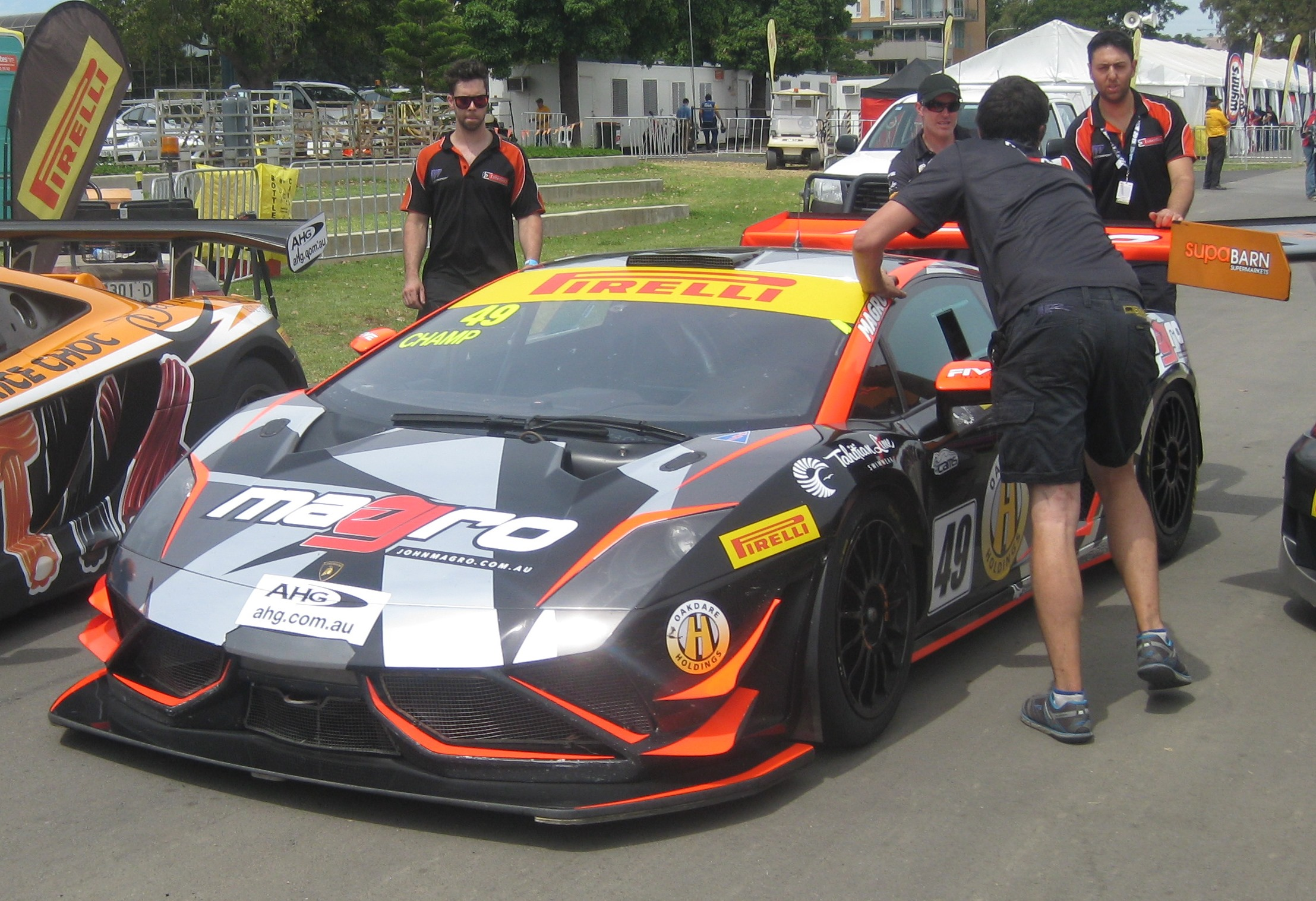
John Magro placed 27th in a Lamborghini Gallardo

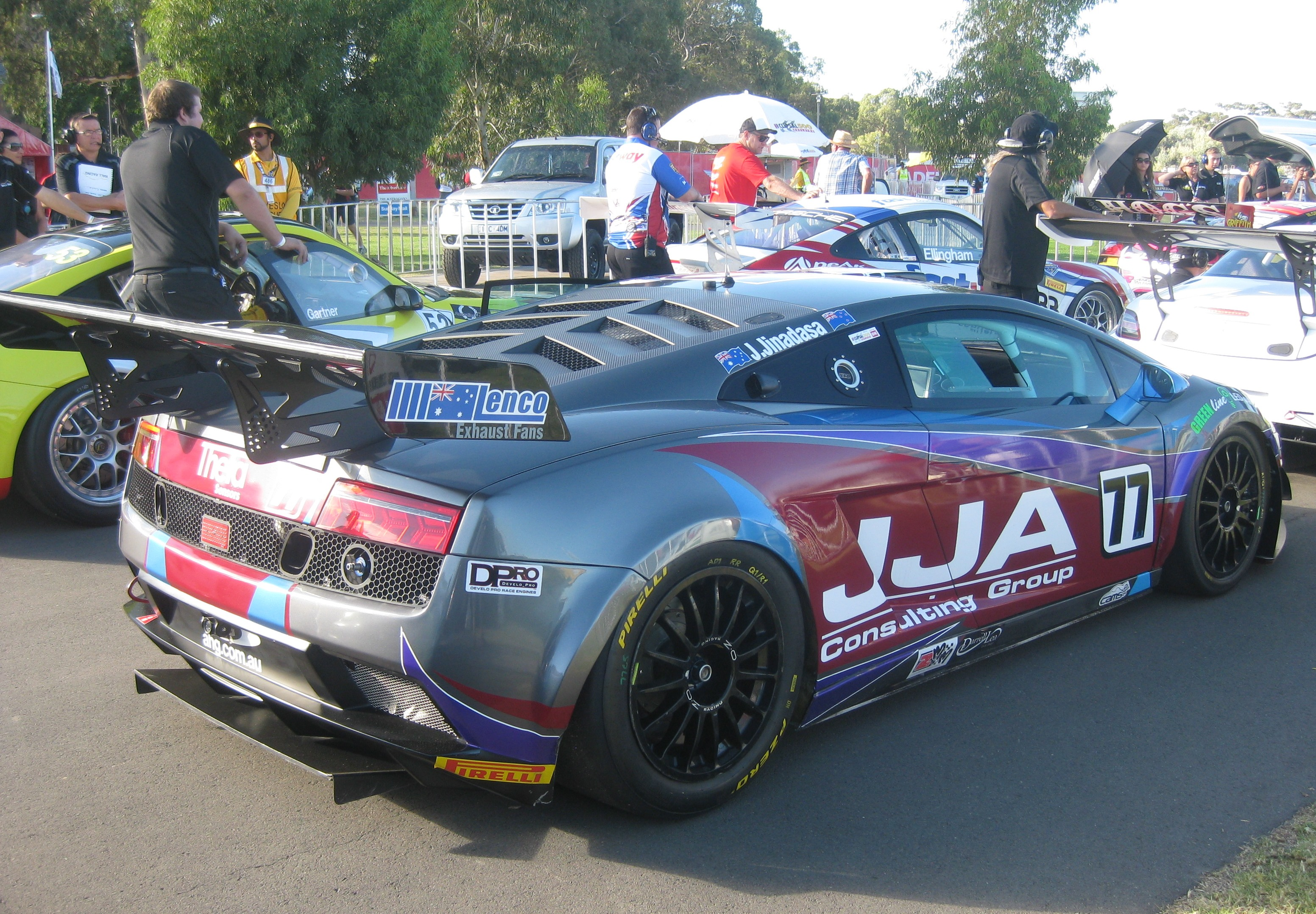
Jan Jinadasa placed 5th in GT Trophy in a Lamborghini Gallardo LP560-4

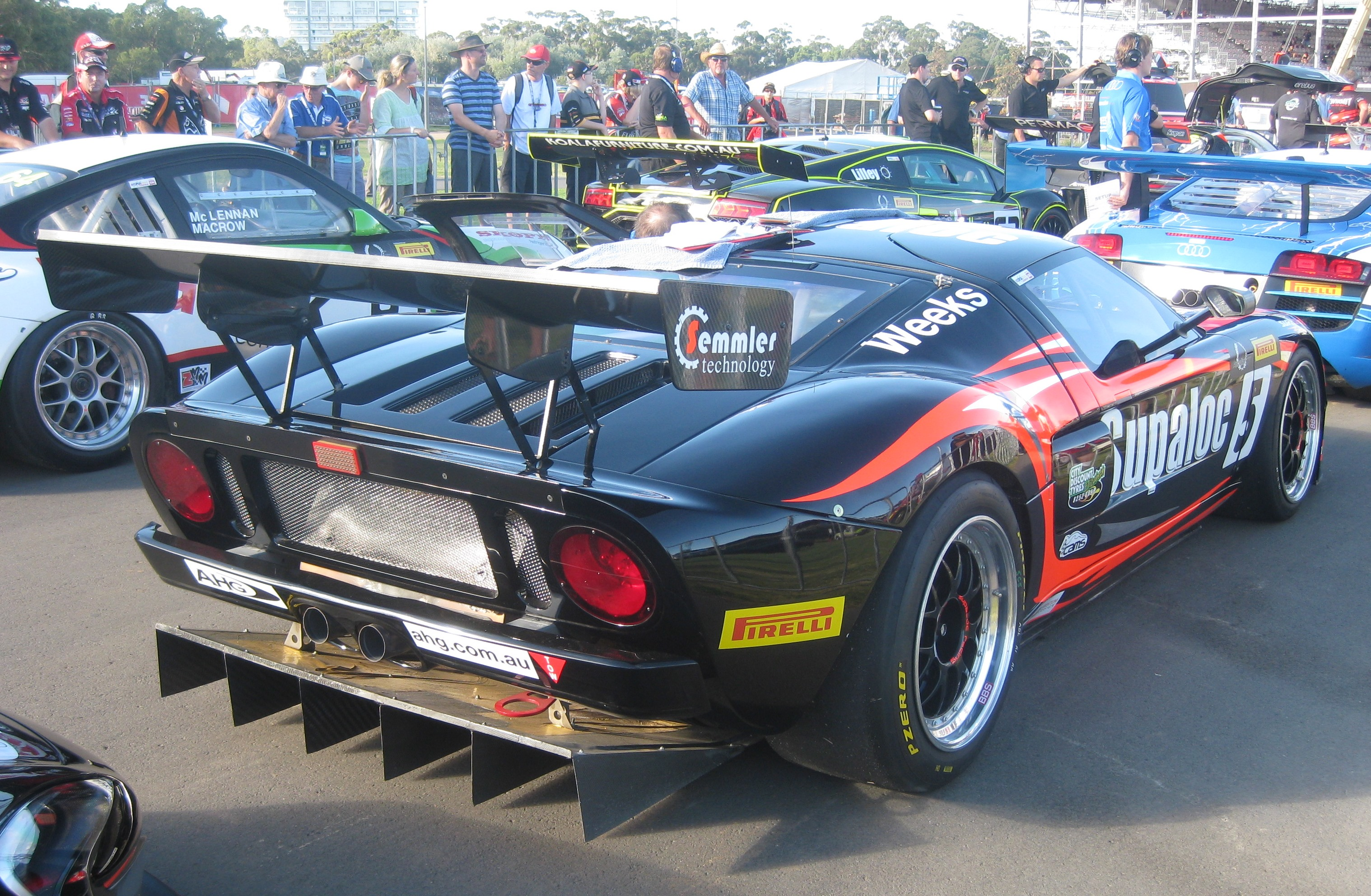
Kevin Weeks placed 8th in GT Trophy in a Ford GT GT3

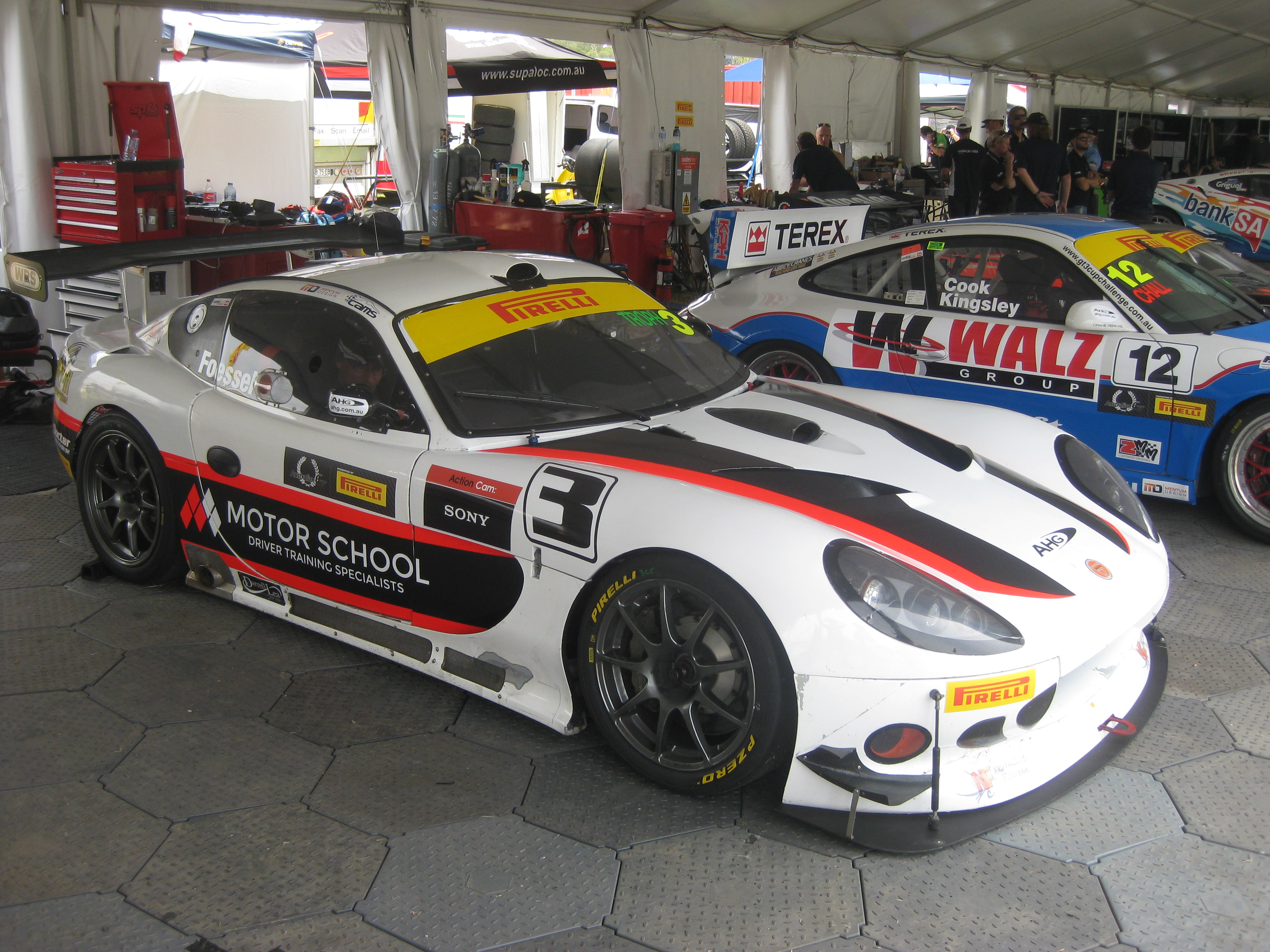
Ben Foessel placed 15th in GT Trophy in a Ginetta G50Z

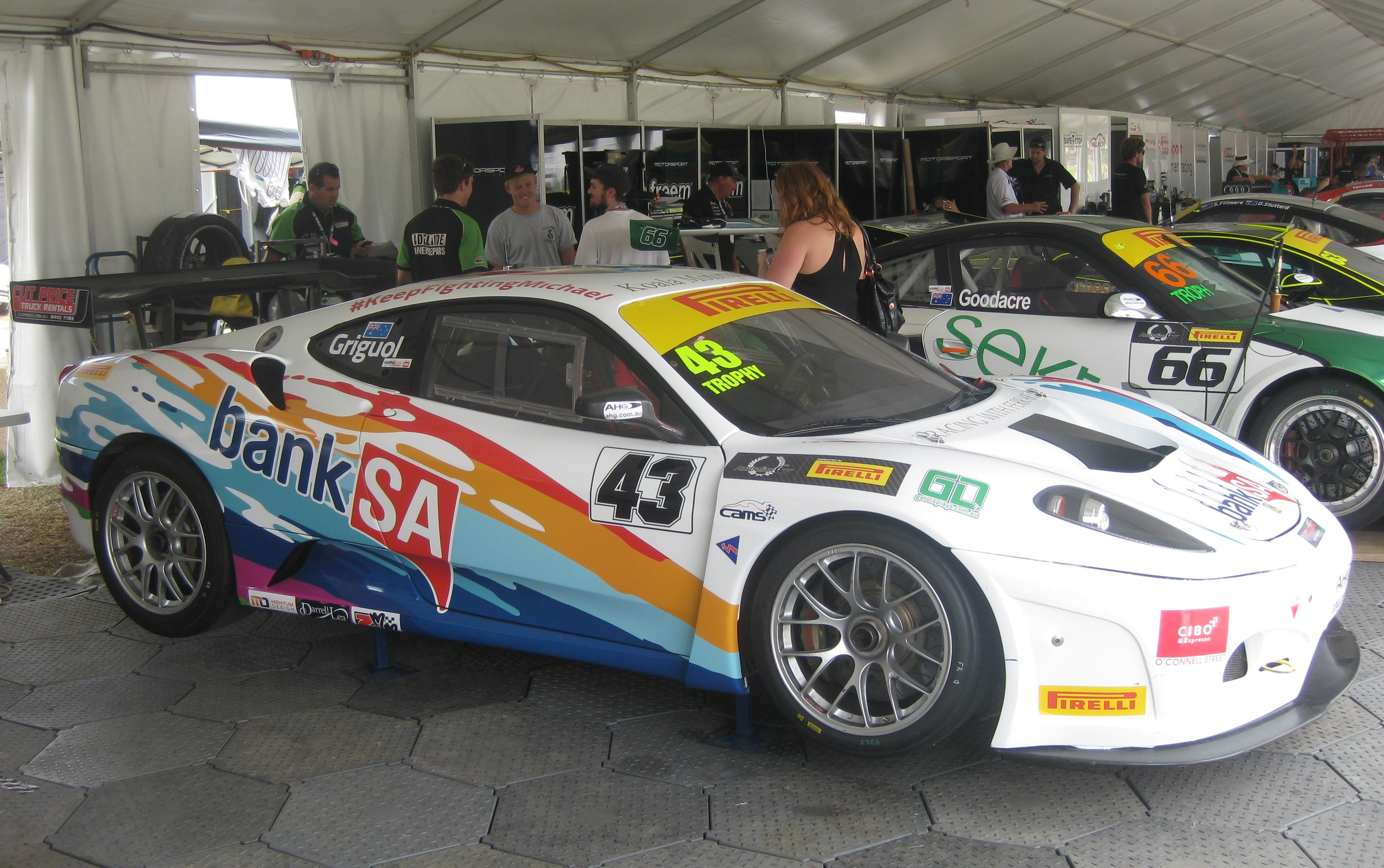
Brenton Griguol placed 19th in GT Trophy in a Ferrari 430 GT3

The championship was contested over six rounds.

Rnd	Circuit	Date	Pole position	Fastest lap	Winning driver	Winning vehicle
1	Adelaide Street Circuit	28 February	(New Zealand) Jono Lester	(New Zealand) Jono Lester	(Australia) Nathan Antunes	Audi R8 Ultra
1	Adelaide Street Circuit	28 February		(Germany) Christopher Mies (Australia) Greg Crick	(Australia) Nathan Antunes	Audi R8 Ultra
1	Adelaide Street Circuit	1 March		(Germany) Christopher Mies	(United Kingdom) Tony Quinn	McLaren MP4-12C
2	Phillip Island Grand Prix Circuit	22–23 May	(New Zealand) Jono Lester (New Zealand) Graeme Smyth	(Germany) Christopher Mies (Australia) Greg Crick	(Germany) Christopher Mies (Australia) Greg Crick	Audi R8 Ultra
3	Townsville Street Circuit	11 July	(New Zealand) Jono Lester	(Germany) Christopher Mies (Australia) Greg Crick	(Australia) Tony D'Alberto (Australia) Grant Denyer	Ferrari 458 Italia
3	Townsville Street Circuit	12 July		(Germany) Christopher Mies (Australia) Greg Crick	(Australia) Nathan Antunes	Audi R8 Ultra
4	Sydney Motorsport Park	22 August	(Australia) Steve Owen (Australia) Kevin Weeks	(Australia) Matt Campbell	(Germany) Christopher Mies (Australia) Ryan Millier	Audi R8 Ultra
4	Sydney Motorsport Park	23 August		(Germany) Christopher Mies (Australia) Ryan Millier	(Australia) Grant Denyer	Ferrari 458 Italia
5	Sandown International Raceway	12 September	(New Zealand) Jono Lester	(Australia) Morgan Haber	(Australia) Tony D'Alberto (Australia) Grant Denyer	Ferrari 458 Italia
5	Sandown International Raceway	13 September		(New Zealand) Jono Lester (New Zealand) Graeme Smyth	(Germany) Christopher Mies (Australia) Ryan Millier	Audi R8 Ultra
6	Highlands Motorsport Park	14 November	(Germany) Christopher Haase (Australia) Steve McLaughlan	(Australia) Klark Quinn (New Zealand) Shane van Gisbergen	(Australia) Klark Quinn (New Zealand) Shane van Gisbergen	McLaren 650S GT3
6	Highlands Motorsport Park	15 November		(Australia) Klark Quinn (New Zealand) Shane van Gisbergen	(Australia) Morgan Haber	Mercedes-Benz SLS AMG GT3

Round 6 at Highlands Motorsport Park in New Zealand comprised two races each of sixty minutes duration. These races were held as support races for the Highlands 101, an endurance race which did not count towards the championship.

== Teams and Drivers ==
Team	Car	No.	Driver	Co-Driver	Class	Rounds
EVA Racing	Audi R8 Ultra	2	(Australia) Peter Fitzgerald		GT	
Motor School	Ginetta G50Z	3			GT Trophy	
	Porsche 911 GT3 Cup Car	4			GT Trophy	
Supaloc Racing	Ford GT GT3	5			GT Trophy	
Skwirk / Beechwood Homes	Audi R8 Ultra	6			GT	
Darrell Lea		7			GT	
Darrell Lea		23			GT	
Darrell Lea		37			GT	
Maranello Motorsport		8			GT	
Maranello Motorsport		88			GT	
Objective Racing		11			GT	
Walz Group		12			GT Challenge	
Keith Wong		15			GT Trophy	
Hog's Breath Cafe		19			GT Trophy	
DJS Racing Motorsport Services		21			GT Trophy	
Scott Taylor Motorsport		22			GT	
Lago Racing		23			GT	
Trass Family Motorsport		27	(New Zealand) Jono Lester		GT	
Erebus Motorsport		28			GT	
Erebus Motorsport		36			GT	
Fastway Couriers		33			GT Trophy	
RentCorp. Forklifts		35			GT Trophy	
Adina Apartment Hotels		38			GT Trophy	
johnmargo.com		46			GT	
Interlloy Motorsport		46			GT	
Interlloy Motorsport		48			GT	
Supabarn Supermarkets		47			GT	
Supabarn Supermarkets		69			GT Trophy	
AMAC Motorsport		51			GT	
SAFE-T-STOP		53			GT Challenge	
Donut King		54			GT Challenge	
Malibu Boats		55			GT Trophy	
Southern Star Developments		57			GT Trophy	
Team FreeM		63			GT	
Motorsport Services		64			GT Trophy	
Gap Solutions		66			GT Trophy	
Thomson Geer Lawyers		68			GT Challenge	
DPM Motorsport		71			GT	
HHH Racing/Triffid/ESP		73			GT	
JAMEC PEM Racing		74	(Germany) Christopher Mies		GT	
JAMEC PEM Racing		75			GT	
JJA Consulting Group		77			GT Trophy	
Flying B Racing		80			GT	
Voight Contracting		93			GT Trophy	

== Divisions ==
Drivers' titles were awarded in four divisions.

- GT Championship - for FIA GT3 specification vehicles
- GT Trophy - for older specification FIA GT3 vehicles
- GT Challenge - for cars that no longer fitted within the GT Championship and GT Trophy divisions
- GT Sports - for GT4 specification cars

== Championship standings ==
Pos	Driver	No.	Vehicle	Competitor/Team	Pts
GT Championship
1	(Germany) Christopher Mies	74	Audi R8 Ultra	JAMEC PEM Racing	643
2	(Australia) Grant Denyer	88	Ferrari 458 Italia	Maranello Motorsport	549
3	(Australia) Klark Quinn	37	McLaren MP4-12C; McLaren 650S GT3	Darrell Lea	531
4	(Australia) Nathan Antunes	6	Audi R8 Ultra	Skwirk / Beechwood Homes	514
5	(New Zealand) Jono Lester	27	Ferrari 458 Italia	Trass Family Motorsport	496
6	(United Kingdom) Tony Quinn	37 & 7	McLaren MP4-12C; McLaren 650S GT3	Darrell Lea	433
7	(Australia) Tony D'Alberto	88	Ferrari 458 Italia	Maranello Motorsport	432
8	(New Zealand) Graeme Smyth	27	Ferrari 458 Italia	Trass Family Motorsport	416
9	(Australia) Max Twigg	36	Mercedes-Benz SLS AMG GT3	Erebus Motorsport Pty Ltd	366
10	(Australia) Ryan Millier	74	Audi R8 Ultra	JAMEC PEM Racing	343
11	(Australia) Greg Crick	74	Audi R8 Ultra	JAMEC PEM Racing	300
12	(Australia) Geoff Emery	36	Mercedes-Benz SLS AMG GT3	Erebus Motorsport Pty Ltd	300
13	(Australia) Morgan Haber	28	Mercedes-Benz SLS AMG GT3	Erebus Motorsport Pty Ltd	291
14	(Australia) James Koundouris	47	Porsche 911 GT3-R	Supabarn Supermarkets	274
15	(Australia) Tony Walls	11	McLaren 650S GT3	Objective Racing	273
16	(Australia) Steve McLaughlan	75	Audi R8 Ultra	JAMEC PEM Racing	233
17	(Australia) Andrew Macpherson	51	Porsche 911 GT3-R	AMAC Motorsport	208
18	(Australia) Bradley Shiels	51	Porsche 911 GT3-R	AMAC Motorsport	180
19	(Australia) Garth Tander	7	McLaren 650S GT3	Darrell Lea	176
20	(Australia) Scott Taylor	22	Porsche 911 GT3-R	Scott Taylor Motorsport	139
21	(New Zealand) Shane van Gisbergen	37	McLaren 650S GT3	Darrell Lea	130
22	(Australia) Justin McMillan	48	Chevrolet Camaro	Interlloy M Motorsport	129
23	(Australia) Glen Wood	46 & 48	Lamborghini Gallardo & Chevrolet Camaro GT3	Interlloy M Motorsport	126
24	(Australia) Marcus Marshall	47	Porsche 911 GT3-R; Porsche 911 GT3 Cup-S	Supabarn Supermarkets	122
25	(Australia) Peter Fitzgerald	2	Audi R8 Ultra	EVA Racing / Evolve Technik	101
26	(Australia) Peter Edwards	80	Bentley Continental	Flying B Racing	99
27	(Australia) John Magro	49 & 46	Lamborghini Gallardo	johnmagro.com	94
28	(New Zealand) Craig Baird	22	Porsche 911 GT3-R	Scott Taylor Motorsport	81
29	(New Zealand) Paul Kelly	27	Ferrari 458 Italia	Trass Family Motorsport	80
30	(Australia) Elliot Barbour	46	Lamborghini Gallardo	Interlloy M Motorsport	70
31	(Australia) Michael Hovey	73	Ginetta G55 GT3	HHH Racing/Triffid/ESP	68
32	(Australia) Jack LeBrocq	48	Chevrolet Camaro	Interlloy M Motorsport	67
33	(Australia) Adrian Deitz	8	Ferrari 458 Italia	Maranello Motorsport	66
34	(Australia) Shae Davies	36	Mercedes-Benz SLS AMG GT3	Erebus Motorsport Pty Ltd	66
35	(Australia) Dale Paterson	74	Chevrolet Camaro	DPM Motorsport	63
36	(Australia) John Bowe	80	Bentley Continental	Flying B Racing	63
37	(Australia) Aaron Seton	22	Porsche 911 GT3-R	Scott Taylor Motorsport	58
38	(Australia) Roger Lago	23	Lamborghini Gallardo R-EX	Lago Racing	57
39	(Australia) Jonathon Webb	23	McLaren MP4-12C	Darrell Lea	54
40	(Australia) Warren Luff	11	McLaren 650S GT3	Objective Racing	50
41	(Australia) Cameron McConville	8	Ferrari 458 Italia	Maranello Motorsport	48
42	(Australia) Nathan Morcom	46	Lamborghini Gallardo	johnmagro.com	45
43	(New Zealand) Steven Richards	71	Chevrolet Camaro	DPM Motorsport	44
44	(Australia) Rod Salmon	6	Audi R8 Ultra	Skwirk / Beechwood Homes	38
45	(Australia) Ross Lilley	63	Lamborghini Gallardo	Team FreeM	33
GT Trophy
Pos	Driver	No.	Vehicle	Competitor/Team	Pts
1	(Australia) Greg Taylor	38	Audi R8 LMS	Adina Apartment Hotels	752
1	(Australia) Barton Mawer	38	Audi R8 LMS	Adina Apartment Hotels	752
2	(Australia) Mark Griffith	19	Audi R8 LMS	Hogs Breath Café	731
3	(Australia) Theo Koundouris	69	Porsche 911 GT3-S	Supabarn Supermarkets	718
4	(New Zealand) Simon Ellingham	33	Porsche 911 GT3 Cup Car	Fastway Couriers	543
5	(Australia) Jan Jinadasa	77	Lamborghini Gallardo LP560-4	JJA Consulting Group	387
6	(Australia) Steve Owen	69 & 5 & 77	Porsche 911 GT3-S & Ford GT GT3 & Lamborghini Gallardo LP560-4	Supabarn Supermarkets & Supaloc Racing & JJA Consulting Group	225
7	(New Zealand) Daniel Gaunt	19	Audi R8 LMS	Hogs Breath Café	173
8	(Australia) Kevin Weeks	5	Ford GT GT3	Supaloc Racing	149
9	(Australia) Steve Voight	93	Porsche 911 GT3 Cup Car	Voight Contracting	142
9	(Australia) Scott Taylor	93	Porsche 911 GT3 Cup Car	Voight Contracting	142
10	(New Zealand) Daniel Gaunt	19	Audi R8 LMS	Hogs Breath Café	130
11	(New Zealand) Andre Heimgartner	33	Porsche 911 GT3 Cup Car	Fastway Couriers	90
12	(Australia) John Goodacre	66	Porsche 911 GT3 Cup Car	Gap Solutions	86
13	(Australia) Danny Stutterd	21	Lamborghini Gallardo	DJS Racing Motorsport Services	75
14	(Australia) Xavier West	55	Porsche 911 GT3 Cup Car	Malibu Boats	74
14	(Australia) Tim Macrow	64	Porsche 911 GT3 Cup Car	Motorsport Services	74
15	(Australia) Ben Foessel	3	Ginetta G50Z	Motor School	69
16	(Australia) Indiran Padayachee	35	Porsche 911 GT3 Cup Car	Rentcorp Forklifts	67
17	(New Zealand) Simon McLennan	64	Porsche 911 GT3 Cup Car	Motorsport Services	65
18	(Australia) Tim Macrow	64	Porsche 911 GT3 Cup Car	Motorsport Services	65
19	(Australia) Brenton Griguol	43	Ferrari 430 GT3	Bank SA	46
20	(Australia) Rob Smith	57	Audi R8 LMS	Southern Star Developments	39
21	(Australia) Peter Conroy	4	Porsche 911 GT3 Cup Car		38
22	(Australia) Sean Varney	4	Porsche 911 GT3 Cup Car		38
23	(Australia) Keith Wong	15	Porsche 911 GT3 Cup Car	Keith Wong	35
24	(Hong Kong) Kuang Wong	15	Porsche 911 GT3 Cup Car	Keith Wong	35
25	(Australia) Matthew Turnbull		Porsche 911 GT3 Cup Car	Fire Rating Solutions	33
GT Challenge
Pos	Driver	No.	Vehicle	Competitor/Team	Pts
1	(Australia) Richard Gartner	53	Porsche 911 GT3 Cup Car	SAFE-T-STOP	726
2	(Australia) Tony Alford	54	Lotus Exige Cup Car; Nissan GTR	Donut King	692
3	(Australia) Michael O'Donnell	68	Porsche 911 GT3 Cup Car	Thomson Geer Lawyers	677
4	(Australia) Brendon Cook	12	Porsche 911 GT3 Cup Car	Walz Group	365
5	(Australia) Mark O'Connor	54	Lotus Exige Cup Car	Donut King	281
6	(Australia) Matt Kingsley	12	Porsche 911 GT3 Cup Car	Walz Group	253
GT Sports
No Participants

- The driver gaining the highest points total over all rounds of the Championship, within their division, was declared the winner of that division.
- If two drivers competed in the same automobile for all, or the majority of the rounds, then the final division position was awarded to both drivers.

== 2015 Australian Tourist Trophy ==
The 2015 Australian Tourist Trophy was awarded by the Confederation of Australian Motor Sport to the driver accumulating the highest aggregate points total from Rounds 2 and 4 of the Australian GT Championship. The title, which was the 25th Australian Tourist Trophy, was won by Christopher Mies driving an Audi R8 Ultra.
