= 2016 GT Asia Series =

Racing series

Seasons
- ← 2015 2017 →

The 2016 GT Asia Series was the seventh season of the GT Asia Series championship. It began on 14 May at the Korea International Circuit and ended at Shanghai International Circuit on 19-20 October, 2016 after 12 championship rounds.

== Entry list ==
2016 Entry List
Team	Car	No.	Drivers	Class	Rounds
(Singapore) Clearwater Racing	Ferrari 488 GT3	3	(Singapore) Weng Sun Mok	GT3	1, 3–4
(Singapore) Clearwater Racing	Ferrari 488 GT3	3	(Singapore) Richard Wee	GT3	1, 4
(Singapore) Clearwater Racing	Ferrari 488 GT3	3	(Italy) Gianmaria Bruni	GT3	3
(Hong Kong) Phoenix Racing Asia	Audi R8 LMS	5	(Hong Kong) Shaun Thong	GT3	All
(Hong Kong) Phoenix Racing Asia	Audi R8 LMS	5	(Hong Kong) Marchy Lee	GT3	All
(Hong Kong) Phoenix Racing Asia	Audi R8 LMS	6	(Malaysia) Alex Yoong	GT3	All
(Hong Kong) Phoenix Racing Asia	Audi R8 LMS	6	(Hong Kong) Alex Au	GT3	All
(Hong Kong) / Bentley Team Absolute (Note: Cars #7, #8 and #9 entered as Bentley Team Absolute and car #13 entered as Absolute Racing.); (Hong Kong) / Absolute Racing	Bentley Continental GT3	7	(Hong Kong) Adderly Fong	GT3	All
(Hong Kong) / Bentley Team Absolute; (Hong Kong) / Absolute Racing	Bentley Continental GT3	7	(South Korea) Andrew Kim	GT3	All
(Hong Kong) / Bentley Team Absolute; (Hong Kong) / Absolute Racing	Bentley Continental GT3	8	(Australia) Jonathan Venter	GT3	All
(Hong Kong) / Bentley Team Absolute; (Hong Kong) / Absolute Racing	Bentley Continental GT3	8	(Japan) Keita Sawa	GT3	1, 3–6
(Hong Kong) / Bentley Team Absolute; (Hong Kong) / Absolute Racing	Bentley Continental GT3	8	(Germany) Fabian Hamprecht	GT3	2
(Hong Kong) / Bentley Team Absolute; (Hong Kong) / Absolute Racing	Bentley Continental GT3	9	(Thailand) Vutthikorn Inthraphuvasak	GT3	All
(Hong Kong) / Bentley Team Absolute; (Hong Kong) / Absolute Racing	Bentley Continental GT3	9	(United States) Andrew Palmer	GT3	1
(Hong Kong) / Bentley Team Absolute; (Hong Kong) / Absolute Racing	Bentley Continental GT3	9	(United Kingdom) Duncan Tappy	GT3	2, 4–6
(Hong Kong) / Bentley Team Absolute; (Hong Kong) / Absolute Racing	Bentley Continental GT3	9	(Germany) Christer Jöns	GT3	3
(Hong Kong) / Bentley Team Absolute; (Hong Kong) / Absolute Racing	Audi R8 LMS	13	(China) Cheng Congfu	GT3	1, 5
(Hong Kong) / Bentley Team Absolute; (Hong Kong) / Absolute Racing	Audi R8 LMS	13	(China) Sun Jingzu	GT3	1, 5
(Thailand) A Motorsport	Porsche 991 GT3 Cup	11	(Thailand) Aekrat Discharoen	GTC	2
(Thailand) / Singha Motorsport (Note: Car #12 entered as Singha Motorsport and cars #59 and #89 entered as Singha Plan-B Motorsport.); (Thailand) / Singha Plan-B Motorsport	Ferrari 458 Italia GT3	12	(Netherlands) Carlo van Dam	GT3	1–5
(Thailand) / Singha Motorsport; (Thailand) / Singha Plan-B Motorsport	Ferrari 458 Italia GT3	12	(Thailand) Piti Bhirombhakdi	GT3	1–5
(Thailand) / Singha Motorsport; (Thailand) / Singha Plan-B Motorsport	Ferrari 458 Challenge	59	(Thailand) Kantasak Kusiri	GTC	1–2, 4
(Thailand) / Singha Motorsport; (Thailand) / Singha Plan-B Motorsport	Ferrari 458 Challenge	59	(Thailand) Bhurit Bhirombhakdi	GTC	1–2, 4
(Thailand) / Singha Motorsport; (Thailand) / Singha Plan-B Motorsport	Ferrari 458 Challenge	89	(Thailand) Tin Sritrai	GTC	2
(Thailand) / Singha Motorsport; (Thailand) / Singha Plan-B Motorsport	Ferrari 458 Challenge	89	(Thailand) Voravud Bhirombhakdi	GTC	2
(China) FFF Racing Team by ACM	Lamborghini Huracán GT3	15	(Netherlands) Jeroen Mul	GT3	5–6
(China) FFF Racing Team by ACM	Lamborghini Huracán GT3	15	(United States) Richard Antinucci	GT3	5
(China) FFF Racing Team by ACM	Lamborghini Huracán GT3	15	(Italy) Marco Mapelli	GT3	6
(China) FFF Racing Team by ACM	Lamborghini Huracán GT3	55	(Italy) Edoardo Liberati	GT3	All
(China) FFF Racing Team by ACM	Lamborghini Huracán GT3	55	(Italy) Andrea Amici	GT3	All
(Japan) Team Rosso Scuderia	Ferrari 458 Challenge	17	(Japan) Akihiro Asai	GTC	4
(Japan) Team Rosso Scuderia	Ferrari 458 Challenge	17	(Japan) Ken Seto	GTC	4
(Sri Lanka) Dilango Racing	Lamborghini Gallardo FL2	24	(Sri Lanka) Dilantha Malagamuwa	GTM	1
(Sri Lanka) Dilango Racing	Lamborghini Gallardo FL2	24	(India) Armaan Ebrahim	GTM	1
(China) BBT	Ferrari 488 GT3	37	(Italy) Davide Rizzo	GT3	All
(China) BBT	Ferrari 488 GT3	37	(China) Anthony Liu	GT3	All
(Chinese Taipei) / Mercedes-AMG Driving Academy-Team AAI (Note: Cars #66 and #68 entered as Mercedes-AMG Driving Academy-Team AAI and car #90 entered as Team FIST with AAI.); (Chinese Taipei) / Team FIST with AAI	Mercedes-AMG GT3	66	(Germany) Nico Bastian	GT3	5
(Chinese Taipei) / Mercedes-AMG Driving Academy-Team AAI; (Chinese Taipei) / Team FIST with AAI	Mercedes-AMG GT3	66	(Hong Kong) Matthew Solomon	GT3	5
(Chinese Taipei) / Mercedes-AMG Driving Academy-Team AAI; (Chinese Taipei) / Team FIST with AAI	Mercedes-AMG GT3	68	(Germany) Maro Engel	GT3	5
(Chinese Taipei) / Mercedes-AMG Driving Academy-Team AAI; (Chinese Taipei) / Team FIST with AAI	Mercedes-AMG GT3	68	(China) Zhang Wenhe	GT3	5
(Chinese Taipei) / Mercedes-AMG Driving Academy-Team AAI; (Chinese Taipei) / Team FIST with AAI	Lamborghini Huracán Super Trofeo	90	(China) Lin Yu	GTM	5
(Chinese Taipei) / Mercedes-AMG Driving Academy-Team AAI; (Chinese Taipei) / Team FIST with AAI	Lamborghini Huracán Super Trofeo	90	(Chinese Taipei) Jun-San Chen	GTM	5
(Japan) Team Naoryu Age Age Racing	Ferrari 458 Challenge	73	(Japan) Toshihito Funai	GTC	4
(Japan) Team Naoryu Age Age Racing	Ferrari 458 Challenge	73	(Japan) Masayuki Ueda	GTC	4
True Visions Motorsport Thailand	Porsche 991 GT3 Cup	78	(Thailand) Suttiluck Buncharoen	GTC	1
(Hong Kong) Craft-Bamboo Racing	Porsche 911 GT3 R	88	(United Kingdom) Richard Lyons	GT3	All
(Hong Kong) Craft-Bamboo Racing	Porsche 911 GT3 R	88	(Hong Kong) Frank Yu	GT3	All
(Hong Kong) Craft-Bamboo Racing	Porsche 911 GT3 R	91	(Hong Kong) Darryl O'Young	GT3	All
(Hong Kong) Craft-Bamboo Racing	Porsche 911 GT3 R	91	(Thailand) Naiyanobh Bhirombhakdi	GT3	All
(Australia) Matt Stone Racing	Aston Martin V12 Vantage GT3	95	(Australia) George Miedecke	GT3	3–4
(Australia) Matt Stone Racing	Aston Martin V12 Vantage GT3	95	(Australia) Nathan Morcom	GT3	3
(Australia) Matt Stone Racing	Aston Martin V12 Vantage GT3	95	(Australia) Ashley Walsh	GT3	4
(Hong Kong) GruppeM Racing	Porsche 911 GT3 R	96	(China) Li Chao	GT3	5–6
(Hong Kong) GruppeM Racing	Porsche 911 GT3 R	96	(China) Zhang Dasheng	GT3	5–6
(Hong Kong) GruppeM Racing	Porsche 911 GT3 R	98	(United Kingdom) Tim Sugden	GT3	1–5
(Hong Kong) GruppeM Racing	Porsche 911 GT3 R	98	(Hong Kong) Philip Ma	GT3	1, 4
(Hong Kong) GruppeM Racing	Porsche 911 GT3 R	98	(United Kingdom) George Richardson	GT3	2
(Hong Kong) GruppeM Racing	Porsche 911 GT3 R	98	(New Zealand) Jono Lester	GT3	3, 5

Icon	Class
GT3	GT3 Class
GTC	GT Cup Class
GTM	GT Masters Class

== Race calendar and results ==
The full calendar for the 2016 season was released on 12 January 2016. The series will consist of 12 championship rounds held in pairs on six circuits across Korea, Thailand, Japan and China. The 3-hour race at Sepang International Circuit will be discontinued after teams voted against it. Also, the non-championship round at the Circuito da Guia in Macau does not feature in the calendar, now the main event of the FIA GT World Cup. The championship would have concluded at the new Zhejiang International Circuit, but delays in the final stages of construction had seen Motorsport Asia Limited make alternate plans. On September 9, it was decided to return to Shanghai for the last two rounds, both run on Thursday 20 October.

Round	Circuit	Date	Pole position	GT3 Winner	GTC Winner	GTM Winner
1	(South Korea) Korea International Circuit	14 May	(Hong Kong) No. 7 Bentley Team Absolute	(Hong Kong) No. 8 Bentley Team Absolute	(Thailand) No. 59 Singha Plan-B Motorsport	(Sri Lanka) No. 24 Dilango Racing
1	(South Korea) Korea International Circuit	14 May	(Hong Kong) Adderly Fong (South Korea) Andrew Kim	(Australia) Jonathan Venter (Japan) Keita Sawa	(Thailand) Kantasak Kusiri (Thailand) Bhurit Bhirombhakdi	(Sri Lanka) Dilantha Malagamuwa (India) Armaan Ebrahim
2	(South Korea) Korea International Circuit	15 May	(Hong Kong) No. 5 Phoenix Racing Asia	(Hong Kong) No. 8 Bentley Team Absolute	(Thailand) No. 59 Singha Plan-B Motorsport	no finishers
2	(South Korea) Korea International Circuit	15 May	(Hong Kong) Shaun Thong (Hong Kong) Marchy Lee	(Australia) Jonathan Venter (Japan) Keita Sawa	(Thailand) Kantasak Kusiri (Thailand) Bhurit Bhirombhakdi	no finishers
3	(Thailand) Chang International Circuit	11 June	(Thailand) No. 12 Singha Motorsport	(Hong Kong) No. 5 Phoenix Racing Asia	(Thailand) No. 11 A Motorsport	no competitors
3	(Thailand) Chang International Circuit	11 June	(Netherlands) Carlo van Dam (Thailand) Piti Bhirombhakdi	(Hong Kong) Shaun Thong (Hong Kong) Marchy Lee	(Thailand) Aekrat Discharoen	no competitors
4	(Thailand) Chang International Circuit	12 June	(China) No. 37 BBT	(China) No. 37 BBT	(Thailand) No. 89 Singha Plan-B Motorsport	no competitors
4	(Thailand) Chang International Circuit	12 June	(Italy) Davide Rizzo (China) Anthony Liu	(Italy) Davide Rizzo (China) Anthony Liu	(Thailand) Tin Sritrai (Thailand) Voravud Bhirombhakdi	no competitors
5	(Japan) Okayama International Circuit	2 July	(Hong Kong) No. 7 Bentley Team Absolute	(Hong Kong) No. 7 Bentley Team Absolute	no competitors	no competitors
5	(Japan) Okayama International Circuit	2 July	(Hong Kong) Adderly Fong (South Korea) Andrew Kim	(Hong Kong) Adderly Fong (South Korea) Andrew Kim	no competitors	no competitors
6	(Japan) Okayama International Circuit	3 July	(Hong Kong) No. 8 Bentley Team Absolute	(Hong Kong) No. 5 Phoenix Racing Asia	no competitors	no competitors
6	(Japan) Okayama International Circuit	3 July	(Australia) Jonathan Venter (Japan) Keita Sawa	(Hong Kong) Shaun Thong (Hong Kong) Marchy Lee	no competitors	no competitors
7	(Japan) Fuji Speedway	16 July	(Hong Kong) No. 88 Craft-Bamboo Racing	(Thailand) No. 12 Singha Motorsport	(Thailand) No. 59 Singha Plan-B Motorsport	no competitors
7	(Japan) Fuji Speedway	16 July	(United Kingdom) Richard Lyons (Hong Kong) Frank Yu	(Netherlands) Carlo van Dam (Thailand) Piti Bhirombhakdi	(Thailand) Kantasak Kusiri (Thailand) Bhurit Bhirombhakdi	no competitors
8	(Japan) Fuji Speedway	17 July	(China) No. 55 FFF Racing Team by ACM	(China) No. 55 FFF Racing Team by ACM	(Thailand) No. 59 Singha Plan-B Motorsport	no competitors
8	(Japan) Fuji Speedway	17 July	(Italy) Edoardo Liberati (Italy) Andrea Amici	(Italy) Edoardo Liberati (Italy) Andrea Amici	(Thailand) Kantasak Kusiri (Thailand) Bhurit Bhirombhakdi	no competitors
9	(China) Shanghai International Circuit	20 August	(Hong Kong) No. 6 Phoenix Racing Asia	(China) No. 37 BBT	no competitors	(Chinese Taipei) No. 90 Team FIST with AAI
9	(China) Shanghai International Circuit	20 August	(Malaysia) Alex Yoong (Hong Kong) Alex Au	(Italy) Davide Rizzo (China) Anthony Liu	no competitors	(China) Lin Yu (Chinese Taipei) Jun-San Chen
10	(China) Shanghai International Circuit	21 August	(China) No. 15 FFF Racing Team by ACM	(Hong Kong) No. 8 Bentley Team Absolute	no competitors	(Chinese Taipei) No. 90 Team FIST with AAI
10	(China) Shanghai International Circuit	21 August	(United States) Richard Antinucci (Netherlands) Jeroen Mul	(Australia) Jonathan Venter (Japan) Keita Sawa	no competitors	(China) Lin Yu (Chinese Taipei) Jun-San Chen
11	(China) Shanghai International Circuit	20 October	(Hong Kong) No. 6 Phoenix Racing Asia	(Hong Kong) No. 6 Phoenix Racing Asia	no competitors	no competitors
11	(China) Shanghai International Circuit	20 October	(Malaysia) Alex Yoong (Hong Kong) Alex Au	(Malaysia) Alex Yoong (Hong Kong) Alex Au	no competitors	no competitors
12	(China) Shanghai International Circuit	20 October	(China) No. 55 FFF Racing Team by ACM	(China) No. 15 FFF Racing Team by ACM	no competitors	no competitors
12	(China) Shanghai International Circuit	20 October	(Italy) Edoardo Liberati (Italy) Andrea Amici	(Italy) Marco Mapelli (Netherlands) Jeroen Mul	no competitors	no competitors
