= Jono Lester =

New Zealand racing driver

Jonathan Lester
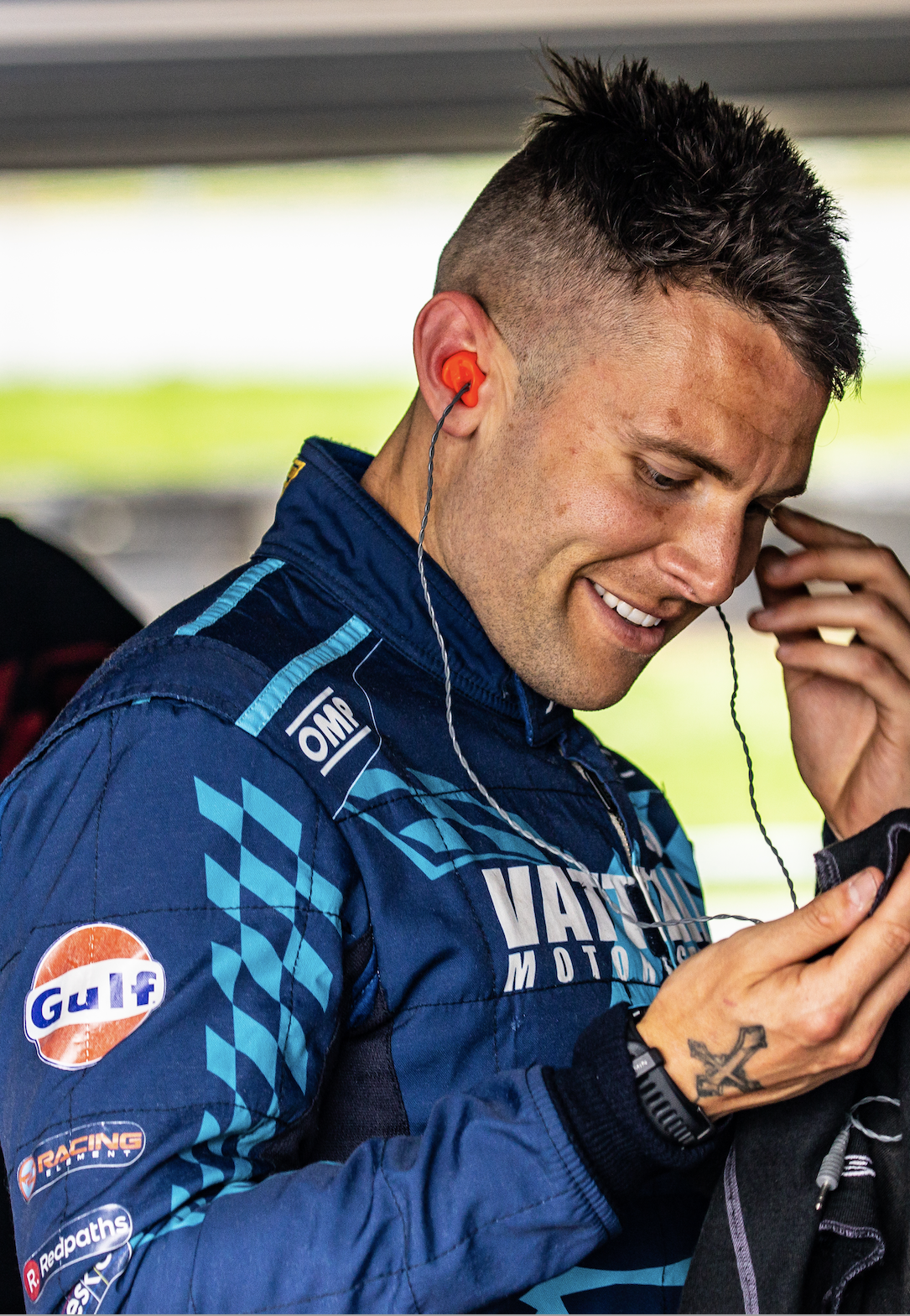
- Lester in 2020
- Nationality: New Zealander
- Born: Jonathan Robert Lester; 8 December 1989 (age 36) Palmerston North, New Zealand
- Relatives: Jaxon Evans (adopted cousin)

Blancpain GT Asia career
- Current team: Absolute Racing
- Categorisation: FIA Silver
- Car number: 912
- Co-driver: Yuan Bo (CHN)
- Starts: 301
- Wins: 38
- Podiums: 107
- Poles: 38
- Fastest laps: 41

Previous series
- 2018 2017 2016 2015 2012-13 2012 2010 2006-09 2008 2004-05 2003-04: Thailand Super Series; Intercontinental GT Challenge; Super GT; Asian Le Mans Series; GT Asia Series; China GT; Lamborghini Super Trofeo Asia; Australian GT; Super Taikyu; Toyota Racing Series; Porsche Supercup; Porsche GT3 Cup NZ; Porsche Carrera Cup Australia; Formula Challenge; Formula First NZ

Championship titles
- 2013 2007-09 2005: NZ Endurance Champion; NZ Time Attack Champion; NZ Formula Challenge Champion

Awards
- 2010 2008 2007: Porsche Motorsport Talent Scholarship; The President's Scholarship; Steel Trophy

Jonathan Robert "Jono" Lester (born 8 December 1989 in Palmerston North) is a racing driver from New Zealand, competing in various GT3 and touring car championships throughout the Asia-Pacific region.

== Career ==
=== Family Heritage ===
Lester is a third generation driver, with grandfather Rob, father Richard and aunt Debbie all winning National titles. Debbie and her husband John are also adopted parents of Jaxon Evans.

Grandparents Rob and Wendy originally set up the Manfeild circuit in Feilding, running events and operations for over thirty years until retirement in 2003.

Rob was awarded the prestigious Jim Clark Trophy in 1979. Richard and Debbie were respective Steel Trophy recipients in 1983 and 1986, representing New Zealand's top driver under 21 years of age.

Richard founded the Shell Formula Ford Scholarship in the early 1990s, which launched the career of many drivers including Bathurst winner Greg Murphy.

=== Early years ===
Lester didn't take the conventional junior pathway of karting, beginning his driving career in Formula Vee at the age of 13.

Lester dovetailed his two seasons in Formula Vee with Formula Challenge, and occasional races in HQ Holdens and the North Island Endurance Series.

Lester won the 2014 Formula Challenge Summer Series.

=== Porsche Carrera Cups ===
Lester's career took another unconventional turn when he graduated to the Porsche GT3 Cup in 2006. In doing so, he became the world's youngest competitor in a Porsche one-make Cup, aged 16 years and ten months.

Four months later, in March 2007, Lester took his maiden victory at Timaru International Motor Raceway to become the World's Youngest Porsche Cups race winner.

Lester finished fourth overall in his debut season, trailing Craig Baird, Fabian Coulthard and Matt Halliday.

In 2009, Lester won both the Hamilton 400 and Taupo A1GP Trophy events, however a brief foray in the 2008 Porsche Carrera Cup Australia Championship was curtailed due to a lack of budget.

Lester won a Porsche Motorsport Talent Factory Scholarship in 2010, after a global shootout of 12 drivers at ACI Vallelunga Circuit, Italy. His prize was a start in the Porsche Supercup at the Monza Grand Prix, where he finished 13th in a field of 32.

=== GT Racing ===
==== 2012 ====
Lester was signed by the Petronas Syntium Team in 2012 for Japan's Super Taikyu Series. He finished second overall in the Championship, driving a Mercedes-Benz SLS AMG GT3.

==== 2013 ====
Lester returned to Japan with the Petronas team in 2013. He again finished second overall in the Super Taikyu Series.

Lester also joined Bernd Schneider for the 12 Hour Merdeka Millennium Endurance (MME) race at Sepang, but retired while leading in the early stages with an engine failure.

==== 2015 ====
Lester joined New Zealand's Trass Family Motorsport for 2015, driving a Ferrari 458 in both the Bathurst 12 Hour and the Australian GT Championship.

Lester scored five of seven pole positions in the Australian GT Championship, including three in a row to set two all-time category records.

Lester's final race with the team ended in controversy, when the TFM Ferrari was disqualified while leading the season-ending Highlands 101 in New Zealand, after pitting outside the compulsory time window.

==== 2016 ====
Lester returned to Asia in 2016, competing in Lamborghini Super Trofeo Asia, GT Asia, China GT and the Asian Le Mans Series.

In Lamborghini Super Trofeo Asia, he finished second overall with three pole positions, one win and nine podiums, driving with Japanese Yudai Uchida.

In the GT Asia Series, he scored GruppeM Racing's first and only podium finish on debut with the team at the Okayama International Circuit, driving a Porsche GT3-R with Englishman Tim Sugden.

In China GT, he was a winner in GTC at Chengdu driving a Porsche 911 GT3 Cup with Chinese driver Pan Chao with the local JRM Team.

In the Asian Le Mans Series, he paired with former F1 test driver Fairuz Fauzy of Malaysia, and Australian Liam Talbot in OD Racing's McLaren 650S GT3.

Lester also made his Japanese Super GT debut in 2016, with a one-off drive at the Suzuka 1000 km in a Lamborghini Huracan GT3 with the Direction Racing team. The car finished many laps down in 19th after multiple tyre failures during the race.

==== 2017 ====
In 2017, Lester made his full-time Japanese Super GT debut. See the section below for details.

==== 2018 ====
In 2018, Lester raced in the Thailand Super Series, Blancpain GT Series Asia and the Intercontinental GT Challenge.

In the Thailand Super Series, Lester was a sole entrant at the opening round of the Championship in a Lamborghini Huracan Super Trofeo, but was uncompetitive.

Lester changed vehicles for round two onwards, pairing with Japanese Akihiro Asai in a Vattana Motorsport Lamborghini Gallardo FL2. The pair won three of six races together, with Lester finishing third in the Championship and helping Vattana Motorsport to the Team's Title.

In Blancpain GT Series Asia, Lester was bought in mid-season to partner Australian Nick Foster at HubAuto Corsa, driving a Ferrari 488.

The pair finished second in their first race together at Fuji Speedway, and took HubAuto's first win at the following round in Shanghai. At the conclusion of the 2018 season, Lester and Foster netted two wins and four podiums from six races.

In the Intercontinental GT Challenge, Lester joined Japanese team D’station Racing for the Suzuka 10 Hours in a Porsche 991 GT3-R. Driving with Tsubasa Kondo and Satoshi Hoshino, they finished many laps down in 28th with multiple unscheduled pit stops to rectify electrical and cooling issues.

=== Super GT ===
Lester joined Gulf Racing in the GT300 class of Japanese Super GT for 2017, driving a Porsche 991 GT3-R.

Paired with Japanese Kyosuke Mineo, they scored a podium on debut at Okayama, finished third after starting 15th on the grid.

Three more top-five finishes throughout the season netted Gulf Racing eighth overall in the GT300 standings.

Lester was set to return with the team for 2018, but a budget cut forced an eleventh hour exit. Mineo also left the team.

=== New Zealand ===
==== 2012 ====
At the start of 2012, Lester made the step into open-wheel racing joining the Toyota Racing Series with ETEC Motorsport. He scored a podium in the opening race of the season and finished sixth in the New Zealand Grand Prix. In another deviation from GT racing, he joined John McIntyre Racing for the V8 SuperTourers Endurance Championship Endurance Series in a Ford Falcon FG. Lester and McIntyre scored two podium finishes at the opening round, the Taupo 400.

Lester also joined Simon Ellingham at Fastway Racing, finishing third overall in the South Island Endurance Series driving a Porsche 997 GT3 Cup.

==== 2013 ====
Lester returned with both John McIntyre Racing and Fastway Racing for 2013.

An uncompetitive run in the V8 SuperTourers saw Lester leave the team after two rounds of the Endurance Series, while at Fastway Racing Lester and Ellingham clean-swept the New Zealand Endurance Championship with two poles and two victories in their Porsche 997.

==== 2014 ====
Lester raced in both the North and South Island Endurance Series’ in 2014 with Trass Family Motorsport, driving a Ferrari F430 Challenge.

Lester won the Hampton Downs 3 Hour race, driving with Robin Gray.

==== 2015 ====
Lester returned to the local Endurance Series’ in 2015 with Trass Family Motorsport, this time driving a GT3-spec Ferrari F430 with Graeme Smyth. The car was fast but unreliable, and failed to finish a race.

==== 2020 ====
Lester spent 2020 competed in New Zealand due to COVID-19 travel restrictions, driving for the CRE Corliss Race Engineering team in their Ford Performance Mustang, as well as DFM Racing in a unique Audi-bodied V8 Supercar. Lester and Matt Dovey drove the Audi to second in the NIERDC 3 Hour Series (Class 1) with two poles, one victory and two fastest laps.

=== Awards ===
Lester was a recipient of the Steel Trophy in 2007, representing New Zealand's top driver under 21 years of age.

In 2008, Lester was awarded The President's Scholarship, a MotorSport New Zealand award in conjunction with world-renowned sports neuroscientist Dr. Kerry Spackman.

== Racing record ==
=== Career summary ===
Season	Series	Team	Races	Wins	Poles	F/Laps	Podiums	Points	Position
2003	NZ Formula First Championship	Sabre Motorsport	21	?	?	?	?	?	18th
2003	Formula First Winter Series	Sabre Motorsport	12	?	1	?	7	?	2nd
2004	New Zealand Grand Prix	Richard Lester Motorsport	1	?	?	?	?	N/A	NC
2004	Formula Challenge Summer Series	Richard Lester Motorsport	6	4	4	4	6	?	1st
2004	NZ Formula First Championship	Richard Lester Motorsport	17	?	?	?	5	?	9th
2004	Formula First Winter Series	Richard Lester Motorsport	12	?	?	?	4	?	4th
2004	Pukekohe 6 Hour Race	Richard Lester Motorsport	1	?	1	1	?	N/A	NC
2004	NZ HQ Holden Championship	Richard Lester Motorsport	3	?	?	?	1	?	4th
2005	Formula Challenge Winter Series	Richard Lester Motorsport	6	3	?	1	5	?	3rd
2006	New Zealand Porsche GT3 Cup	Richard Lester Motorsport	20	1	?	?	2	?	4th
2007	New Zealand Porsche GT3 Cup	International Motorsport	15	1	1	2	7	?	5th
2007	New Zealand Time Attack Series	EVO88U Racing	1	1	1	1	1	?	1st
2008	Australian Carrera Cup Championship	Greg Murphy Racing	19	0	0	0	0	300	12th
2008	New Zealand Porsche GT3 Cup	International Motorsport	12	1	?	?	5	?	4th
2008	New Zealand Sportscar Series	Juno Racing NZ	3	2	1	3	2	?	1st
2008	New Zealand Time Attack Series	EVO88U Racing	1	1	1	1	1	?	1st
2009	Porsche GT3 NZ: Taupo A1GP Trophy	International Motorsport	3	2	2	1	3	?	1st
2010	Porsche Supercup	Porsche AG	1	0	0	0	0	0	NC†
2010	New Zealand Time Attack Series	Cheapskates Racing	1	?	?	?	1	?	2nd
2011	Toyota Racing Series	ETEC Motorsport	3	0	0	0	0	157	16th
2011	World Time Attack Challenge	Team RevolutioNZ	1	?	?	?	?	?	13th
2011	New Zealand Time Attack Series	EVO88U/Cheapskates Racing	2	1	?	1	2	?	1st
2012	Super Taikyu Endurance Series	Petronas Syntium Team	6	1	3	1	4	80	2nd
2012	Toyota Racing Series	ETEC Motorsport	15	0	0	0	1	514	11th
2012	V8SuperTourer Endurance Championship	John McIntyre Racing	5	0	?	?	2	771	11th
2012	South Island Endurance Series	Fastway Racing	4	1	2	3	1	270	3rd
2013	Merdeka Millennium Endurance Race	Petronas Syntium Team	1	?	?	?	?	N/A	NC
2013	Super Taikyu Endurance Series	Petronas Syntium Team	5	1	2	2	3	86	2nd
2013	New Zealand Endurance Championship	Fastway Racing	2	2	2	2	2	150	1st
2013	V8 SuperTourer Championship	John McIntyre Racing	5	0	?	?	0	217	43rd
2014	Australian GT Championship	Trass Family Motorsport	2	?	?	?	?	26	27th
2014	Australian GT Trophy	Fastway Couriers	1	?	?	?	?	29	20th
2014	Highlands 101	Trass Family Motorsport	1	?	?	?	?	?	NC
2014	Hampton Downs 3 Hour Race	Trass Family Motorsport	1	1	?	?	1	N/A	1st
2014	Hampton Downs 6 Hour Race	Trass Family Motorsport	1	?	?	?	?	N/A	NC
2015	Australian GT Championship	Trass Family Motorsport	11	?	4	3	5	496	5th
2015	North Island Endurance Series	Trass Family Motorsport	2	?	1	?	1	107	4th
2015	Liqui Moly Bathurst 12 Hour - Class A	Trass Family Motorsport	1	0	0	0	0	N/A	DNF
2016	GT Asia Series - GT3	GruppeM Racing	4	?	?	?	1	32	22nd
2016	China GT Championship	JR Motorsports Club	4	1	?	?	2		NC
2016	Lamborghini Super Trofeo Asia	Direction Racing	10	1	4	2	9	126	2nd
2016-17	Asian Le Mans Series - GT	OD Racing Best Leader Team	3	0	0	0	0	5	18th
2017	Super GT - GT300	Pacific with Gulf Racing	8	0	0	0	1	31	8th
2018	Thailand Super Series	Vattana Motorsport	8	3	2	3	4	120	3rd
2018	GT Asia Series - GT3	Vattana Motorsport	4	1	?	1	2	?	NC
2018	Blancpain GT Series Asia - GT3	HubAuto Corsa	6	2	0	0	3	82	8th
2018	Suzuka 10 Hours	D'station Racing	1	0	0	0	0	N/A	28th
2019	Thailand Super Series	Vattana Motorsport	2	?	?	?	?	?	NC
2019	Blancpain GT World Challenge Asia - GT3	Absolute Racing	2	0	0	0	0	10	32nd
2019	North Island Endurance Series (GT-B)	DFM Racing	1	1	1	1	1	75	NC
2020	NIERDC 1 Hour - GT-B	CRE Corliss Race Engineering	2	?	?	?	?	121	9th
2020	NIERDC 3 Hour - Class 1	DFM Racing	2	1	2	2	1	115	2nd
2022	TCR Taiwan Series	HubAuto Racing							
2024	GT World Challenge Asia	Team KRC	4	0	0	?	0	1	42nd
2024-25	Asian Le Mans Series - GT	Prime Speed Sport	6	0	0	0	0	2	23th
2025	24H Series - GT3	Prime Speed Sport							
2026	TSS The Super Series - GTM	PSC Motorsport							
