= Lihpao Racing Park =

Motorsport race track in Houli, Taichung, Taiwan

Lihpao Racing Park 麗寶國際賽車場
- G2 Circuit (2018–present)
- Location: Houli, Taichung, Taiwan
- Coordinates: 24°19′08″N 120°41′08″E
- Capacity: 9,500
- FIA Grade: 2
- Broke ground: August 2017; 9 years ago
- Opened: 6 November 2018; 7 years ago
- Major events: Current: STS (2022–present); TCR Taiwan (2022–present)
- Website: Official website

G2 Circuit (2018–present)
- Length: 3.5 km (2.2 mi)
- Turns: 23
- Race lap record: 1:48.426 ( (New Zealand) Jonathan Lester, Audi RS 3 LMS TCR, 2022, TCR)

Wind Circuit (2018–present)
- Length: 2 km (1.2 mi)
- Turns: 13

Lihpao Racing Park (traditional Chinese: 麗寶國際賽車場; simplified Chinese: 丽宝国际赛车场; pinyin: Lìbǎo Guójì Sàichēchǎng) is a 3.500 km (2.175 mi) motorsport race track, situated in the Houli District of Taichung, Taiwan.

== History ==
The construction project was presented in 2015 by Yue-Mei International Development Corp, with the intention of holding four international events, including one Formula 3 race and fifty private events per year. The track would be built around the pre-existing karting track. Construction work began in August 2017, in partnership with Audi, and was completed in November of the following year. The track has received FIA Grade 2 certification.

In 2022, the circuit became the main venue for the annual TCR Taiwan Series.
