= 2018 Blancpain GT Series Asia =

The 2018 Blancpain GT Series Asia was the second season of the Blancpain GT Series Asia, an auto racing series for grand tourer cars in Asia co-promoted by the SRO Motorsports Group and Team Asia One GT Management. The races were contested with GT3-spec and GT4-spec cars. The season began on 14 April at Sepang and ended on 14 October at Ningbo.

== Calendar ==
At the annual press conference during the 2017 24 Hours of Spa on 28 July, the Stéphane Ratel Organisation announced the first draft of the 2018 calendar. Initially, no changes were made to the schedule compared to 2017. On 27 September 2017, it was announced the races in Buriram were moved one week earlier to avoid a clash with the 3 Hours of Silverstone. On 29 January 2018, it was announced Ningbo would replace Zhejiang as the final round of the season.

Round	Circuit	Date
1	Sepang International Circuit, Sepang, Malaysia	14–15 April
2	Chang International Circuit, Buriram, Thailand	12–13 May
3	Suzuka Circuit, Suzuka, Japan	30 June–1 July
4	Fuji Speedway, Oyama, Japan	21–22 July
5	Shanghai International Circuit, Jiading, China	22–23 September
6	Ningbo International Speedpark, Ningbo, China	13–14 October

== Entry list ==
=== GT3 ===
Team	Car	No.	Drivers	Class	Rounds
(China) Absolute Racing (Note: Cars No. 3, 7 and 37 entered as Absolute Racing under Chinese licence and car No. 59 entered as Singha Plan-B by Absolute Racing under Thai licence.) (Thailand) Singha Plan-B by Absolute Racing	Audi R8 LMS	3	(China) Franky Cheng	S	All
(China) Absolute Racing (Thailand) Singha Plan-B by Absolute Racing	Audi R8 LMS	3	(Estonia) Martin Rump	S	All
(China) Absolute Racing (Thailand) Singha Plan-B by Absolute Racing	Audi R8 LMS	7	(Hong Kong) Adderly Fong	PA	All
(China) Absolute Racing (Thailand) Singha Plan-B by Absolute Racing	Audi R8 LMS	7	(South Korea) Andrew Kim	PA	All
(China) Absolute Racing (Thailand) Singha Plan-B by Absolute Racing	Audi R8 LMS	37	(China) Anthony Liu	PA	All
(China) Absolute Racing (Thailand) Singha Plan-B by Absolute Racing	Audi R8 LMS	37	(Hong Kong) Josh Burdon	PA	1–4
(China) Absolute Racing (Thailand) Singha Plan-B by Absolute Racing	Audi R8 LMS	37	(Belgium) Alessio Picariello	PA	5–6
(China) Absolute Racing (Thailand) Singha Plan-B by Absolute Racing	Audi R8 LMS	59	(Thailand) Bhurit Bhirombhakdi	Am	5
(China) Absolute Racing (Thailand) Singha Plan-B by Absolute Racing	Audi R8 LMS	59	(China) Jingzu Sun	Am	5
(Hong Kong) / Phoenix Racing Asia (Note: Car No. 5 entered as Phoenix Racing Asia at rounds 1–4 and as Bentley Team Phoenix Racing Asia at rounds 5–6. Car No. 6 entered as Bentley Team Phoenix Racing Asia.); (Hong Kong) / Bentley Team Phoenix Racing Asia	Audi R8 LMS	5	(Singapore) Keong Wee Lim	PA	1
(Hong Kong) / Phoenix Racing Asia; (Hong Kong) / Bentley Team Phoenix Racing Asia	Audi R8 LMS	5	(Malaysia) Alex Yoong	PA	1
(Hong Kong) / Phoenix Racing Asia; (Hong Kong) / Bentley Team Phoenix Racing Asia	Audi R8 LMS	5	(Malaysia) Alex Yoong	S	2–4
(Hong Kong) / Phoenix Racing Asia; (Hong Kong) / Bentley Team Phoenix Racing Asia	Audi R8 LMS	5	(Hong Kong) Marchy Lee	S	2
(Hong Kong) / Phoenix Racing Asia; (Hong Kong) / Bentley Team Phoenix Racing Asia	Audi R8 LMS	5	(Hong Kong) Shaun Thong	S	3–4
(Hong Kong) / Phoenix Racing Asia; (Hong Kong) / Bentley Team Phoenix Racing Asia	Bentley Continental GT3	5	(Malaysia) Alex Yoong	S	5–6
(Hong Kong) / Phoenix Racing Asia; (Hong Kong) / Bentley Team Phoenix Racing Asia	Bentley Continental GT3	5	(Hong Kong) Marchy Lee	S	5
(Hong Kong) / Phoenix Racing Asia; (Hong Kong) / Bentley Team Phoenix Racing Asia	Bentley Continental GT3	5	(Macau) André Couto	S	6
(Hong Kong) / Phoenix Racing Asia; (Hong Kong) / Bentley Team Phoenix Racing Asia	Bentley Continental GT3	6	(South Africa) Jordan Pepper	S	5–6
(Hong Kong) / Phoenix Racing Asia; (Hong Kong) / Bentley Team Phoenix Racing Asia	Bentley Continental GT3	6	(Hong Kong) Shaun Thong	S	5–6
(Japan) ARN Racing	Ferrari 488 GT3	8	(Japan) Hiroaki Nagai	PA	1–2, 4–6
(Japan) ARN Racing	Ferrari 488 GT3	8	(Japan) Daisuke Itō	PA	1–2, 5–6
(Japan) ARN Racing	Ferrari 488 GT3	8	(Japan) Kota Sasaki	PA	4
(Japan) ARN Racing	Ferrari 488 GT3	8	(Japan) Hiroaki Nagai	Am	3
(Japan) ARN Racing	Ferrari 488 GT3	8	(Japan) Shinji Takei	Am	3
(Hong Kong) KCMG	Nissan GT-R Nismo GT3	18	(Japan) Yukinori Taniguchi	PA	All
(Hong Kong) KCMG	Nissan GT-R Nismo GT3	18	(Japan) Tsugio Matsuda	PA	1–2
(Hong Kong) KCMG	Nissan GT-R Nismo GT3	18	(Hong Kong) Alexandre Imperatori (Note: Imperatori is a Swiss driver who competed under a Swiss licence at round 3 and a Hong Kong licence at rounds 4–6.)	PA	3–6
(Hong Kong) KCMG	Nissan GT-R Nismo GT3	23	(Italy) Edoardo Liberati	S	All
(Hong Kong) KCMG	Nissan GT-R Nismo GT3	23	(Germany) Florian Strauss	S	All
(Hong Kong) KCMG	Audi R8 LMS	45	(Japan) Takuya Shirasaka	Am	1–5
(Hong Kong) KCMG	Audi R8 LMS	45	(Japan) Naoto Takeda	Am	1–5
(China) FFF Racing Team by ACM	Lamborghini Huracán GT3	19	(Croatia) Martin Kodrić	S	All
(China) FFF Racing Team by ACM	Lamborghini Huracán GT3	19	(Denmark) Dennis Lind	S	All
(China) FFF Racing Team by ACM	Lamborghini Huracán GT3	63	(Japan) Hiroshi Hamaguchi	PA	All
(China) FFF Racing Team by ACM	Lamborghini Huracán GT3	63	(Switzerland) Marco Mapelli	PA	All
(Chinese Taipei) HubAuto Corsa	Ferrari 488 GT3	27	(Australia) Nick Foster	S	All
(Chinese Taipei) HubAuto Corsa	Ferrari 488 GT3	27	(China) Leo Ye	S	1–3
(Chinese Taipei) HubAuto Corsa	Ferrari 488 GT3	27	(New Zealand) Jono Lester	S	4–6
(Chinese Taipei) HubAuto Corsa	Ferrari 488 GT3	28	(Chinese Taipei) Morris Chen	PA	All
(Chinese Taipei) HubAuto Corsa	Ferrari 488 GT3	28	(Australia) Tim Slade	PA	1–3, 5–6
(Chinese Taipei) HubAuto Corsa	Ferrari 488 GT3	28	(Italy) Davide Rigon	PA	4
(Japan) Porsche Team EBI	Porsche 911 GT3 R	33	(Japan) Naoya Yamano	S	3–4
(Japan) Porsche Team EBI	Porsche 911 GT3 R	33	(Japan) Tetsuya Yamano	S	3–4
(Japan) D'station Racing	Porsche 911 GT3 R	47	(Japan) Seiji Ara	PA	3–4
(Japan) D'station Racing	Porsche 911 GT3 R	47	(Japan) Satoshi Hoshino	PA	3–4
(Australia) AMAC Motorsport	Lamborghini Huracán GT3	51	(Australia) Andrew Macpherson	Am	All
(Australia) AMAC Motorsport	Lamborghini Huracán GT3	51	(Australia) William Ben Porter	Am	All
(China) Anstone Racing	Mercedes-AMG GT3	66	(China) Weian Chen	S	5
(China) Anstone Racing	Mercedes-AMG GT3	66	(Italy) Massimiliano Wiser	S	5
(China) Anstone Racing	Mercedes-AMG GT3	71	(China) Wei Xu	PA	5
(China) Anstone Racing	Mercedes-AMG GT3	71	(Japan) Naoki Yokomizo	PA	5
(Malaysia) CMRT Eurasia	Aston Martin V12 Vantage GT3	69	(Malaysia) Adrian Henry D'Silva	Am	1
(Malaysia) CMRT Eurasia	Aston Martin V12 Vantage GT3	69	(Hong Kong) Rick Yoon	Am	1
(Malaysia) OD Racing Team WRT	Audi R8 LMS	86	(Malaysia) Mitchell Gilbert	S	All
(Malaysia) OD Racing Team WRT	Audi R8 LMS	86	(India) Aditya Patel	S	All
(South Korea) Indigo Racing	Mercedes-AMG GT3	97	(Netherlands) Roelof Bruins	PA	1–5
(South Korea) Indigo Racing	Mercedes-AMG GT3	97	(South Korea) Juwon Seo	PA	1–5
(South Korea) Indigo Racing	Mercedes-AMG GT3	97	(Netherlands) Roelof Bruins	S	6
(South Korea) Indigo Racing	Mercedes-AMG GT3	97	(Switzerland) Manuel Metzger	S	6
(Malaysia) Arrows Racing	Honda NSX GT3	98	(Hong Kong) Philip Ma	Am	1, 4
(Malaysia) Arrows Racing	Honda NSX GT3	98	(Hong Kong) Jacky Yeung	Am	1
(Malaysia) Arrows Racing	Honda NSX GT3	98	(Japan) Shinji Takei	Am	4
(Japan) CarGuy Racing	Ferrari 458 Italia GT3	117	(China) Wei Xu	PA	4
(Japan) CarGuy Racing	Ferrari 458 Italia GT3	117	(Japan) Naoki Yokomizo	PA	4
(Japan) CarGuy Racing	Lamborghini Huracán GT3	777	(Japan) Kei Cozzolino	PA	3–4
(Japan) CarGuy Racing	Lamborghini Huracán GT3	777	(Japan) Takeshi Kimura	PA	3–4
(Japan) APJ Motorsports	Lamborghini Huracán GT3	177	(Japan) Kouichi Okumura	PA	4
(Japan) APJ Motorsports	Lamborghini Huracán GT3	177	(Japan) Daisuke Yamawaki	PA	4
(Japan) / Kizashi x Saccess Racing (Note: Car No. 390 entered as Kizashi x Saccess Racing at Round 3 and as Saccess Racing at Round 4.); (Japan) / Saccess Racing	Lamborghini Huracán GT3	390	(Japan) Naoki Yokomizo	PA	3
(Japan) / Kizashi x Saccess Racing; (Japan) / Saccess Racing	Lamborghini Huracán GT3	390	(Japan) Tamotsu Kondo	PA	3
(Japan) / Kizashi x Saccess Racing; (Japan) / Saccess Racing	Lamborghini Huracán GT3	390	(Japan) Tamotsu Kondo	Am	4
(Japan) / Kizashi x Saccess Racing; (Japan) / Saccess Racing	Lamborghini Huracán GT3	390	(Japan) Ken Seto	Am	4
(China) JRM	Porsche 911 GT3 R	808	(New Zealand) Chris van der Drift	PA	5
(China) JRM	Porsche 911 GT3 R	808	(China) Chao Li	PA	5
(Hong Kong) GruppeM Racing Team	Mercedes-AMG GT3	888	(Italy) Raffaele Marciello	PA	1, 3–6
(Hong Kong) GruppeM Racing Team	Mercedes-AMG GT3	888	(Luxembourg) Brice Bosi	PA	1
(Hong Kong) GruppeM Racing Team	Mercedes-AMG GT3	888	(Germany) Alexander Mattschull	PA	2–6
(Hong Kong) GruppeM Racing Team	Mercedes-AMG GT3	888	(Germany) Maximilian Buhk	PA	2
(Hong Kong) GruppeM Racing Team	Mercedes-AMG GT3	999	(Switzerland) Patric Niederhauser	S	All
(Hong Kong) GruppeM Racing Team	Mercedes-AMG GT3	999	(Germany) Nico Bastian	S	1, 4–6
(Hong Kong) GruppeM Racing Team	Mercedes-AMG GT3	999	(Germany) Markus Pommer	S	2–3
(Hong Kong) Craft-Bamboo Racing	Porsche 911 GT3 R	911	(Australia) Shae Davies	S	All
(Hong Kong) Craft-Bamboo Racing	Porsche 911 GT3 R	911	(Thailand) Sandy Stuvik	S	All
(Hong Kong) Craft-Bamboo Racing	Porsche 911 GT3 R	991	(Australia) Aidan Read	S	All
(Hong Kong) Craft-Bamboo Racing	Porsche 911 GT3 R	991	(Hong Kong) Darryl O'Young	S	All

Icon	Class
S	Silver Cup
PA	Pro-Am Cup
Am	Am Cup

=== GT4 ===
Team	Car	No.	Drivers	Class	Rounds
(Australia) M-Motorsport	KTM X-Bow GT4	10	(Australia) Justin McMillan	Am	5–6
(Australia) M-Motorsport	KTM X-Bow GT4	10	(Australia) Dean Koutsoumidis	Am	5
(Hong Kong) TTR Team SARD	Porsche Cayman GT4 Clubsport MR	11	(Hong Kong) Tony Fong	Am	All
(Hong Kong) TTR Team SARD	Porsche Cayman GT4 Clubsport MR	11	(Chinese Taipei) Brian Lee	Am	All
(Singapore) Clearwater Racing	McLaren 570S GT4	12	(Singapore) Richard Wee	Am	1–4
(Singapore) Clearwater Racing	McLaren 570S GT4	12	(Singapore) Weng Sun Mok	Am	1
(Singapore) Clearwater Racing	McLaren 570S GT4	12	(Singapore) Daniel Au	Am	2–4
(Thailand) Morseng Racing Team	Porsche Cayman GT4 Clubsport MR	14	(Thailand) Tosaphol Phamyai	Am	2
(Thailand) Morseng Racing Team	Porsche Cayman GT4 Clubsport MR	14	(Thailand) Chayapon Yotha	Am	2
(Chinese Taipei) Taiwan Top Speed Racing Team	Porsche Cayman GT4 Clubsport MR	17	(Chinese Taipei) Keo Chang	Am	All
(Chinese Taipei) Taiwan Top Speed Racing Team	Porsche Cayman GT4 Clubsport MR	17	(Japan) Masahiko Ida	Am	1, 6
(Chinese Taipei) Taiwan Top Speed Racing Team	Porsche Cayman GT4 Clubsport MR	17	(Chinese Taipei) Jeff Lu	Am	2
(Chinese Taipei) Taiwan Top Speed Racing Team	Porsche Cayman GT4 Clubsport MR	17	(Chinese Taipei) George Chou	Am	3–4
(Chinese Taipei) Taiwan Top Speed Racing Team	Porsche Cayman GT4 Clubsport MR	17	(Chinese Taipei) Jeremy Wang	Am	5
(Thailand) JWD Unixx Racing Team	Porsche Cayman GT4 Clubsport MR	22	(Thailand) Charvanin Bunditkitsada	Am	2
(Thailand) JWD Unixx Racing Team	Porsche Cayman GT4 Clubsport MR	22	(Thailand) Pitsanu Sirimongkolkasem	Am	2
(Chinese Taipei) Team iRace.Win	Mercedes-AMG GT4	72	(Singapore) Ringo Chong	Am	All
(Chinese Taipei) Team iRace.Win	Mercedes-AMG GT4	72	(France) Gilles Vannelet	Am	1–4
(Chinese Taipei) Team iRace.Win	Mercedes-AMG GT4	72	(Hong Kong) Alex Au	Am	5–6
(Hong Kong) Craft-Bamboo Racing	Porsche Cayman GT4 Clubsport MR	77	(France) Jean-Marc Merlin	Am	1–2
(Hong Kong) Craft-Bamboo Racing	Porsche Cayman GT4 Clubsport MR	77	(Hong Kong) Frank Yu	Am	1–2
(Hong Kong) Craft-Bamboo Racing	Mercedes-AMG GT4	77	(France) Jean-Marc Merlin	Am	3
(Hong Kong) Craft-Bamboo Racing	Mercedes-AMG GT4	77	(Hong Kong) Frank Yu	Am	3
(Hong Kong) Craft-Bamboo Racing	Mercedes-AMG GT4	88	(Macau) Diana Rosario	Am	5–6
(Hong Kong) Craft-Bamboo Racing	Mercedes-AMG GT4	88	(Hong Kong) James Tang	Am	5
(Hong Kong) Craft-Bamboo Racing	Mercedes-AMG GT4	88	(China) Naomi Zhang	Am	6
Racing Spirit Thailand	Porsche Cayman GT4 Clubsport MR	80	(Thailand) Sontaya Kunplome	Am	2
Racing Spirit Thailand	Porsche Cayman GT4 Clubsport MR	80	(Thailand) Preeda Tantemsapya	Am	2
(Japan) BMW Team Studie	BMW M4 GT4	81	(Japan) Takayuki Kinoshita	Am	All
(Japan) BMW Team Studie	BMW M4 GT4	81	(Japan) Jukuchou Sunako	Am	All
(Japan) BMW Team Studie	BMW M4 GT4	82	(Chinese Taipei) Max Chen	Am	All
(Japan) BMW Team Studie	BMW M4 GT4	82	(Japan) Ken Urata	Am	All
(Hong Kong) GruppeM Racing Team	Mercedes-AMG GT4	666	(Germany) Reinhold Renger	Am	All
(Hong Kong) GruppeM Racing Team	Mercedes-AMG GT4	666	(United States) Russell Ward	Am	1
(Hong Kong) GruppeM Racing Team	Mercedes-AMG GT4	666	(Japan) Ryuichirou Ohtsuka	Am	3, 6
(Hong Kong) GruppeM Racing Team	Mercedes-AMG GT4	666	(South Korea) Doyun Hwang	Am	4
(Hong Kong) GruppeM Racing Team	Mercedes-AMG GT4	666	(South Korea) Rick Yoon	Am	5

== Race results ==
Bold indicates overall winner.

Round		Circuit	Pole position	Silver Winners	Pro-Am Winners	Am Winners	GT4 Winners
1	R1	(Malaysia) Sepang	(China) No. 19 FFF Racing Team by ACM	**(Hong Kong) No. 999 GruppeM Racing Team**	(Hong Kong) No. 888 GruppeM Racing Team	(Hong Kong) No. 45 KCMG	(Hong Kong) No. 666 GruppeM Racing Team
1	R1	(Malaysia) Sepang	(Croatia) Martin Kodrić (Denmark) Dennis Lind	**(Germany) Nico Bastian** **(Switzerland) Patric Niederhauser**	(Luxembourg) Brice Bosi (Italy) Raffaele Marciello	(Japan) Takuya Shirasaka (Japan) Naoto Takeda	(Germany) Reinhold Renger (United States) Russell Ward
1	R2	(Malaysia) Sepang	(China) No. 37 Absolute Racing	(China) No. 3 Absolute Racing	**(Hong Kong) No. 888 GruppeM Racing Team**	(Hong Kong) No. 45 KCMG	(Chinese Taipei) No. 72 Team iRace.Win
1	R2	(Malaysia) Sepang	(Hong Kong) Josh Burdon (China) Anthony Liu	(China) Franky Cheng (Estonia) Martin Rump	**(Luxembourg) Brice Bosi** **(Italy) Raffaele Marciello**	(Japan) Takuya Shirasaka (Japan) Naoto Takeda	(Singapore) Ringo Chong (France) Gilles Vannelet
2	R1	(Thailand) Buriram	(Hong Kong) No. 999 GruppeM Racing Team	**(Hong Kong) No. 999 GruppeM Racing Team**	(China) No. 63 FFF Racing Team by ACM	(Hong Kong) No. 45 KCMG	(Hong Kong) No. 666 GruppeM Racing Team
2	R1	(Thailand) Buriram	(Switzerland) Patric Niederhauser (Germany) Markus Pommer	**(Switzerland) Patric Niederhauser** **(Germany) Markus Pommer**	(Japan) Hiroshi Hamaguchi (Switzerland) Marco Mapelli	(Japan) Takuya Shirasaka (Japan) Naoto Takeda	(Germany) Reinhold Renger
2	R2	(Thailand) Buriram	(Hong Kong) No. 888 GruppeM Racing Team	(China) No. 19 FFF Racing Team by ACM	**(Hong Kong) No. 888 GruppeM Racing Team**	(Hong Kong) No. 45 KCMG	(Hong Kong) No. 666 GruppeM Racing Team
2	R2	(Thailand) Buriram	(Germany) Maximilian Buhk (Germany) Alexander Mattschull	(Croatia) Martin Kodrić (Denmark) Dennis Lind	**(Germany) Maximilian Buhk** **(Germany) Alexander Mattschull**	(Japan) Takuya Shirasaka (Japan) Naoto Takeda	(Germany) Reinhold Renger
3	R1	(Japan) Suzuka	(China) No. 3 Absolute Racing	**(China) No. 3 Absolute Racing**	(Hong Kong) No. 18 KCMG	(Hong Kong) No. 45 KCMG	(Japan) No. 81 BMW Team Studie
3	R1	(Japan) Suzuka	(China) Franky Cheng (Estonia) Martin Rump	**(China) Franky Cheng** **(Estonia) Martin Rump**	(Hong Kong) Alexandre Imperatori (Japan) Yukinori Taniguchi	(Japan) Takuya Shirasaka (Japan) Naoto Takeda	(Japan) Takayuki Kinoshita (Japan) Jukuchou Sunako
3	R2	(Japan) Suzuka	(Chinese Taipei) No. 27 HubAuto Corsa	**(China) No. 19 FFF Racing Team by ACM**	(China) No. 63 FFF Racing Team by ACM	(Japan) No. 8 ARN Racing	(Hong Kong) No. 666 GruppeM Racing Team
3	R2	(Japan) Suzuka	(Australia) Nick Foster (China) Leo Ye	**(Croatia) Martin Kodrić** **(Denmark) Dennis Lind**	(Japan) Hiroshi Hamaguchi (Switzerland) Marco Mapelli	(Japan) Hiroaki Nagai (Japan) Shinji Takei	(Japan) Ryuichirou Ohtsuka (Germany) Reinhold Renger
4	R1	(Japan) Fuji	(Hong Kong) No. 23 KCMG	(Chinese Taipei) No. 27 HubAuto Corsa	**(Hong Kong) No. 18 KCMG**	(Hong Kong) No. 45 KCMG	(Japan) No. 81 BMW Team Studie
4	R1	(Japan) Fuji	(Italy) Edoardo Liberati (Germany) Florian Strauss	(Australia) Nick Foster (New Zealand) Jono Lester	**(Hong Kong) Alexandre Imperatori** **(Japan) Yukinori Taniguchi**	(Japan) Takuya Shirasaka (Japan) Naoto Takeda	(Japan) Takayuki Kinoshita (Japan) Jukuchou Sunako
4	R2	(Japan) Fuji	(Hong Kong) No. 18 KCMG	**(Hong Kong) No. 999 GruppeM Racing Team**	(Hong Kong) No. 888 GruppeM Racing Team	(Hong Kong) No. 45 KCMG	(Japan) No. 81 BMW Team Studie
4	R2	(Japan) Fuji	(Hong Kong) Alexandre Imperatori (Japan) Yukinori Taniguchi	**(Germany) Nico Bastian** **(Switzerland) Patric Niederhauser**	(Italy) Raffaele Marciello (Germany) Alexander Mattschull	(Japan) Takuya Shirasaka (Japan) Naoto Takeda	(Japan) Takayuki Kinoshita (Japan) Jukuchou Sunako
5	R1	(China) Shanghai	(China) No. 19 FFF Racing Team by ACM	**(Chinese Taipei) No. 27 HubAuto Corsa**	(China) No. 37 Absolute Racing	(Hong Kong) No. 45 KCMG	(Hong Kong) No. 666 GruppeM Racing Team
5	R1	(China) Shanghai	(Croatia) Martin Kodrić (Denmark) Dennis Lind	**(Australia) Nick Foster** **(New Zealand) Jono Lester**	(China) Anthony Liu (Belgium) Alessio Picariello	(Japan) Takuya Shirasaka (Japan) Naoto Takeda	(Germany) Reinhold Renger (South Korea) Rick Yoon
5	R2	(China) Shanghai	(China) No. 19 FFF Racing Team by ACM	**(China) No. 19 FFF Racing Team by ACM**	(China) No. 63 FFF Racing Team by ACM	(Thailand) No. 59 Singha Plan-B by Absolute Racing	(Japan) No. 81 BMW Team Studie
5	R2	(China) Shanghai	(Croatia) Martin Kodrić (Denmark) Dennis Lind	**(Croatia) Martin Kodrić** **(Denmark) Dennis Lind**	(Japan) Hiroshi Hamaguchi (Switzerland) Marco Mapelli	(Thailand) Bhurit Bhirombhakdi (China) Jingzu Sun	(Japan) Takayuki Kinoshita (Japan) Jukuchou Sunako
6	R1	(China) Ningbo	(Hong Kong) No. 999 GruppeM Racing Team	**(Chinese Taipei) No. 27 HubAuto Corsa**	(China) No. 7 Absolute Racing	(Australia) No. 51 AMAC Motorsport	(Hong Kong) No. 666 GruppeM Racing Team
6	R1	(China) Ningbo	(Germany) Nico Bastian (Switzerland) Patric Niederhauser	**(Australia) Nick Foster** **(New Zealand) Jono Lester**	(Hong Kong) Adderly Fong (South Korea) Andrew Kim	(Australia) Andrew Macpherson (Australia) William Ben Porter	(Japan) Ryuichirou Ohtsuka (Germany) Reinhold Renger
6	R2	(China) Ningbo	(Hong Kong) No. 888 GruppeM Racing Team	**(China) No. 19 FFF Racing Team by ACM**	(China) No. 37 Absolute Racing	(Australia) No. 51 AMAC Motorsport	(Japan) No. 81 BMW Team Studie
6	R2	(China) Ningbo	(Italy) Raffaele Marciello (Germany) Alexander Mattschull	**(Croatia) Martin Kodrić** **(Denmark) Dennis Lind**	(China) Anthony Liu (Belgium) Alessio Picariello	(Australia) Andrew Macpherson (Australia) William Ben Porter	(Japan) Takayuki Kinoshita (Japan) Jukuchou Sunako

== Championship standings ==
Scoring system

Championship points were awarded for the first ten positions in each race. Entries were required to complete 75% of the winning car's race distance in order to be classified and earn points. Individual drivers were required to participate for a minimum of 25 minutes in order to earn championship points in any race.

Position	**1st**	**2nd**	**3rd**	**4th**	**5th**	**6th**	**7th**	**8th**	**9th**	**10th**
Points	25	18	15	12	10	8	6	4	2	1

=== Drivers' championships ===
==== Overall ====
Pos.	Driver	Team	SEP (Malaysia)		CHA (Thailand)		SUZ (Japan)		FUJ (Japan)		SHA (China)		NIN (China)		Points
GT3
1	(Croatia) Martin Kodrić (Denmark) Dennis Lind	(China) FFF Racing Team by ACM	**2**	6	5	2	3	1	5	19	**7**	**1**	5	1	170
2	(Australia) Nick Foster	(Chinese Taipei) HubAuto Corsa	4	5	2	6	4	**15**	2	7	1	7	1	10	142
3	(Switzerland) Patric Niederhauser	(Hong Kong) GruppeM Racing Team	1	Ret	**1**	11	5	3	4	1	10	5	**Ret**	Ret	123
4	(China) Franky Cheng (Estonia) Martin Rump	(China) Absolute Racing	8	4	3	5	**1**	28	6	12	16	4	2	4	116
5	(Japan) Hiroshi Hamaguchi (Switzerland) Marco Mapelli	(China) FFF Racing Team by ACM	7	3	4	10	17	4	Ret	3	4	2	7	12	97
6	(Italy) Edoardo Liberati (Germany) Florian Strauss	(Hong Kong) KCMG	5	9	8	3	Ret	2	**3**	5	6	6	Ret	8	96
7	(Italy) Raffaele Marciello	(Hong Kong) GruppeM Racing Team	3	1			8	6	17	2	14	3	14	**21**	85
8	(New Zealand) Jono Lester	(Chinese Taipei) HubAuto Corsa							2	7	1	7	1	10	82
9	(Japan) Yukinori Taniguchi	(Hong Kong) KCMG	13	7	6	4	6	14	1	**4**	Ret	9	10	11	75
10	(Germany) Nico Bastian	(Hong Kong) GruppeM Racing Team	1	Ret					4	1	10	5	**Ret**	Ret	73
11	(Germany) Alexander Mattschull	(Hong Kong) GruppeM Racing Team			17	**1**	8	6	17	2	14	3	14	**21**	70
12	(China) Anthony Liu	(China) Absolute Racing	6	**2**	10	7	29	17	12	13	2	Ret	Ret	2	69
13	(China) Leo Ye	(Chinese Taipei) HubAuto Corsa	4	5	2	6	4	**15**							60
14	(Germany) Markus Pommer	(Hong Kong) GruppeM Racing Team			**1**	11	5	3							50
15	(Hong Kong) Alexandre Imperatori	(Hong Kong) KCMG					6	14	1	**4**	Ret	9	10	11	49
16	(Australia) Shae Davies (Thailand) Sandy Stuvik	(Hong Kong) Craft-Bamboo Racing	10	12	11	8	2	5	Ret	8	9	8	Ret	Ret	43
16	(Hong Kong) Adderly Fong (South Korea) Andrew Kim	(China) Absolute Racing	Ret	8	9	15	30	Ret	13	14	3	15	4	6	43
17	(Luxembourg) Brice Bosi	(Hong Kong) GruppeM Racing Team	3	1											40
17	(Malaysia) Mitchell Gilbert (India) Aditya Patel	(Malaysia) OD Racing Team WRT	Ret	10	7	13	7	7	10	16	8	Ret	6	7	40
18	(Belgium) Alessio Picariello	(China) Absolute Racing									2	Ret	Ret	2	36
19	(Hong Kong) Josh Burdon	(China) Absolute Racing	6	**2**	10	7	29	17	12	13					33
20	(Netherlands) Roelof Bruins	(South Korea) Indigo Racing	Ret	15	12	16	11	20	11	20	12	14	3	3	30
20	(Switzerland) Manuel Metzger	(South Korea) Indigo Racing											3	3	30
21	(Japan) Tsugio Matsuda	(Hong Kong) KCMG	13	7	6	4									26
22	(Germany) Maximilian Buhk	(Hong Kong) GruppeM Racing Team			17	**1**									25
23	(Malaysia) Alex Yoong	(Hong Kong) Phoenix Racing Asia	12	13	15	9	9	8	7	10					19
23	(Malaysia) Alex Yoong	(Hong Kong) Bentley Team Phoenix Racing Asia									21	29	12	9	19
24	(Australia) Aidan Read (Hong Kong) Darryl O'Young	(Hong Kong) Craft-Bamboo Racing	11	14	14	17	28	9	14	17	5	12	9	Ret	14
25	(Hong Kong) Shaun Thong	(Hong Kong) Phoenix Racing Asia					9	8	7	10					13
25	(Hong Kong) Shaun Thong	(Hong Kong) Bentley Team Phoenix Racing Asia									Ret^{1}	11^{1}	Ret^{1}	5^{1}	13
26	(Chinese Taipei) Morris Chen	(Chinese Taipei) HubAuto Corsa	Ret	17	13	14	10	Ret	8	9	11	10	8	13	12
27	(Japan) Hiroaki Nagai	(Japan) ARN Racing	9	11	19	12	15	11	22	6	13	13	11	Ret	10
28	(Japan) Kota Sasaki	(Japan) ARN Racing							22	6					8
29	(Italy) Davide Rigon	(Chinese Taipei) HubAuto Corsa							8	9					6
29	(Australia) Tim Slade	(Chinese Taipei) HubAuto Corsa	Ret	17	13	14	10	Ret			11	10	8	13	6
30	(Macau) André Couto	(Hong Kong) Bentley Team Phoenix Racing Asia											12	9	4
31	(Japan) Naoya Yamano (Japan) Tetsuya Yamano	(Japan) Porsche Team EBI					12	10	9	15					3
32	(Japan) Daisuke Itō	(Japan) ARN Racing	9	11	19	12					13	13	11	Ret	2
32	(Hong Kong) Marchy Lee	(Hong Kong) Phoenix Racing Asia			15	9									2
32	(Hong Kong) Marchy Lee	(Hong Kong) Bentley Team Phoenix Racing Asia									21	29			2
	(South Korea) Juwon Seo	(South Korea) Indigo Racing	Ret	15	12	16	11	20	11	20	12	14			0
	(Japan) Seiji Ara (Japan) Satoshi Hoshino	(Japan) D'station Racing					13	13	16	11					0
	(Japan) Shinji Takei	(Japan) ARN Racing					15	11							0
	(Japan) Shinji Takei	(Malaysia) Arrows Racing							27	22					0
	(Singapore) Keong Wee Lim	(Hong Kong) Phoenix Racing Asia	12	13											0
	(Japan) Kei Cozzolino (Japan) Takeshi Kimura	(Japan) CarGuy Racing					16	12	30	18					0
	(Australia) Andrew Macpherson (Australia) William Ben Porter	(Australia) AMAC Motorsport	15	19	18	Ret	18	19	19	23	20	21	13	14	0
	(Japan) Takuya Shirasaka (Japan) Naoto Takeda	(Hong Kong) KCMG	14	16	16	18	14	16	18	21	19	17			0
	(Japan) Naoki Yokomizo	(Japan) Kizashi x Saccess Racing					19	18							0
	(Japan) Naoki Yokomizo	(Japan) CarGuy Racing							15	32					0
	(Japan) Naoki Yokomizo	(China) Anstone Racing									17^{2}	18^{2}			0
	(China) Wei Xu	(Japan) CarGuy Racing							15	32					0
	(China) Wei Xu	(China) Anstone Racing									17^{2}	18^{2}			0
	(Hong Kong) Philip Ma	(Malaysia) Arrows Racing	16	20					27	22					0
	(Hong Kong) Jacky Yeung	(Malaysia) Arrows Racing	16	20											0
	(Japan) Tamotsu Kondo	(Japan) Kizashi x Saccess Racing					19	18							0
	(Japan) Tamotsu Kondo	(Japan) Saccess Racing							21	24					0
	(Malaysia) Adrian Henry D'Silva (Hong Kong) Rick Yoon	(Malaysia) CMRT Eurasia	Ret	18											0
	(Japan) Kouichi Okumura (Japan) Daisuke Yamawaki	(Japan) APJ Motorsports							20	25					0
	(Japan) Ken Seto	(Japan) Saccess Racing							21	24					0
Guest drivers ineligible to score points
	(South Africa) Jordan Pepper	(Hong Kong) Bentley Team Phoenix Racing Asia									Ret	11	Ret	5	
	(New Zealand) Chris van der Drift (China) Chao Li	(China) JRM									15	20			
	(Thailand) Bhurit Bhirombhakdi (China) Jingzu Sun	(Thailand) Singha Plan-B by Absolute Racing									DNS	16			
	(China) Weian Chen (Italy) Massimiliano Wiser	(China) Anstone Racing									18	19			
GT4
1	(Germany) Reinhold Renger	(Hong Kong) GruppeM Racing Team	**17**	23	20	**19**	**21**	21	29	33	22	Ret	15	16	215
2	(Japan) Takayuki Kinoshita (Japan) Jukuchou Sunako	(Japan) BMW Team Studie	20	22	**29**	Ret	20	**24**	**23**	**26**	**23**	**22**	**21**	**15**	196
3	(Singapore) Ringo Chong	(Chinese Taipei) Team iRace.Win	19	**21**	26	20	23	22	24	30	24	28	16	17	180
4	(Chinese Taipei) Max Chen (Japan) Ken Urata	(Japan) BMW Team Studie	22	25	23	21	22	26	28	28	26	23	19	18	148
5	(France) Gilles Vannelet	(Chinese Taipei) Team iRace.Win	19	**21**	26	20	23	22	24	30					122
6	(Chinese Taipei) Keo Chang	(Chinese Taipei) Taiwan Top Speed Racing Team	24	26	24	23	24	25	26	29	27	26	20	19	118
7	(Hong Kong) Tony Fong (Chinese Taipei) Brian Lee	(Hong Kong) TTR Team SARD	23	27	25	Ret	25	27	25	27	25	24	Ret	DNS	94
8	(Japan) Ryuichirou Ohtsuka	(Hong Kong) GruppeM Racing Team					**21**	21					15	16	86
9	(France) Jean-Marc Merlin (Hong Kong) Frank Yu	(Hong Kong) Craft-Bamboo Racing	18	24	21	22	27	23							79
10	(Hong Kong) Alex Au	(Chinese Taipei) Team iRace.Win									24	28	16	17	58
11	(Chinese Taipei) George Chou	(Chinese Taipei) Taiwan Top Speed Racing Team					24	25	26	29					44
12	(United States) Russell Ward	(Hong Kong) GruppeM Racing Team	**17**	23											40
13	(Japan) Masahiko Ida	(Chinese Taipei) Taiwan Top Speed Racing Team	24	26									20	19	34
14	(Singapore) Richard Wee	(Singapore) Clearwater Racing	21	28	WD	WD	26	Ret	Ret	31					28
15	(South Korea) Rick Yoon	(Hong Kong) GruppeM Racing Team									22	Ret			25
16	(Chinese Taipei) Jeremy Wang	(Chinese Taipei) Taiwan Top Speed Racing Team									27	26			20
16	(Chinese Taipei) Jeff Lu	(Chinese Taipei) Taiwan Top Speed Racing Team			24	23									20
17	(Thailand) Charvanin Bunditkitsada (Thailand) Pitsanu Sirimongkolkasem	(Thailand) JWD Unixx Racing Team			22	26									19
18	(Singapore) Weng Sun Mok	(Singapore) Clearwater Racing	21	28											14
18	(South Korea) Doyun Hwang	(Hong Kong) GruppeM Racing Team							29	33					14
18	(Singapore) Daniel Au	(Singapore) Clearwater Racing			WD	WD	26	Ret	Ret	31					14
19	(Thailand) Sontaya Kunplome (Thailand) Preeda Tantemsapya	Racing Spirit Thailand			27	24									12
20	(Thailand) Tosaphol Phamyai (Thailand) Chayapon Yotha	(Thailand) Morseng Racing Team			28	25									8
Guest drivers ineligible to score points
	(Australia) Justin McMillan	(Australia) M-Motorsport									28	25	17	Ret	
	(Macau) Diana Rosario	(Hong Kong) Craft-Bamboo Racing									29	27	18	20	
	(China) Naomi Zhang	(Hong Kong) Craft-Bamboo Racing											18	20	
	(Australia) Dean Koutsoumidis	(Australia) M-Motorsport									28	25			
	(Hong Kong) James Tang	(Hong Kong) Craft-Bamboo Racing									29	27			
Pos.	Driver	Team	SEP (Malaysia)		CHA (Thailand)		SUZ (Japan)		FUJ (Japan)		SHA (China)		NIN (China)		Points

Key
Colour	Result
Gold	Race winner
Silver	2nd place
Bronze	3rd place
Green	Points finish
Blue	Non-points finish
Blue	Non-classified finish (NC)
Purple	Did not finish (Ret)
Black	Disqualified (DSQ)
Black	Excluded (EX)
White	Did not start (DNS)
White	Race cancelled (C)
White	Withdrew (WD)
Blank	Did not participate

**Bold** – Pole
Italics – Fastest Lap

Notes

- ^{1} – Shaun Thong was a guest driver at Shanghai and Ningbo and therefore ineligible to score points.
- ^{2} – Wei Xu and Naoki Yokomizo were guest drivers at Shanghai and therefore ineligible to score points.

==== Silver Cup ====
Pos.	Driver	Team	SEP (Malaysia)		CHA (Thailand)		SUZ (Japan)		FUJ (Japan)		SHA (China)		NIN (China)		Points
1	(Croatia) Martin Kodrić (Denmark) Dennis Lind	(China) FFF Racing Team by ACM	**2**	6	5	2	3	1	5	19	**7**	**1**	5	1	197
2	(Australia) Nick Foster	(Chinese Taipei) HubAuto Corsa	4	5	2	**6**	4	**15**	2	**7**	1	7	1	**10**	183
3	(China) Franky Cheng (Estonia) Martin Rump	(China) Absolute Racing	8	**4**	3	5	**1**	28	6	12	16	4	2	4	164
4	(Switzerland) Patric Niederhauser	(Hong Kong) GruppeM Racing Team	1	Ret	**1**	11	5	3	4	1	10	5	**Ret**	Ret	142
5	(Italy) Edoardo Liberati (Germany) Florian Strauss	(Hong Kong) KCMG	5	9	8	3	Ret	2	**3**	5	6	6	Ret	8	141
6	(New Zealand) Jono Lester	(Chinese Taipei) HubAuto Corsa							2	**7**	1	7	1	**10**	106
7	(Australia) Shae Davies (Thailand) Sandy Stuvik	(Hong Kong) Craft-Bamboo Racing	10	12	11	8	2	5	Ret	8	9	8	Ret	Ret	90
8	(Germany) Nico Bastian	(Hong Kong) GruppeM Racing Team	1	Ret					4	1	10	5	**Ret**	Ret	86
9	(Malaysia) Mitchell Gilbert (India) Aditya Patel	(Malaysia) OD Racing Team WRT	Ret	10	7	13	7	7	10	16	8	Ret	6	7	82
10	(China) Leo Ye	(Chinese Taipei) HubAuto Corsa	4	5	2	**6**	4	**15**							77
11	(Australia) Aidan Read (Hong Kong) Darryl O'Young	(Hong Kong) Craft-Bamboo Racing	11	14	14	17	28	9	14	17	5	12	9	Ret	62
12	(Malaysia) Alex Yoong	(Hong Kong) Phoenix Racing Asia			15	9	9	8	7	10					62
12	(Malaysia) Alex Yoong	(Hong Kong) Bentley Team Phoenix Racing Asia									21	29	12	9	62
13	(Germany) Markus Pommer	(Hong Kong) GruppeM Racing Team			**1**	11	5	3							56
14	(Netherlands) Roelof Bruins (Switzerland) Manuel Metzger	(South Korea) Indigo Racing											3	3	33
15	(Hong Kong) Shaun Thong	(Hong Kong) Phoenix Racing Asia					9	8	7	10					32
15	(Hong Kong) Shaun Thong	(Hong Kong) Bentley Team Phoenix Racing Asia									Ret^{1}	11^{1}	Ret^{1}	5^{1}	32
16	(Japan) Naoya Yamano (Japan) Tetsuya Yamano	(Japan) Porsche Team EBI					12	10	9	15					20
17	(Hong Kong) Marchy Lee	(Hong Kong) Phoenix Racing Asia			15	9									16
17	(Hong Kong) Marchy Lee	(Hong Kong) Bentley Team Phoenix Racing Asia									21	29			16
18	(Macau) André Couto	(Hong Kong) Bentley Team Phoenix Racing Asia											12	9	14
Guest drivers ineligible to score Silver class points
	(South Africa) Jordan Pepper	(Hong Kong) Bentley Team Phoenix Racing Asia									Ret	11	Ret	5	
	(China) Weian Chen (Italy) Massimiliano Wiser	(China) Anstone Racing									18	19			
Pos.	Driver	Team	SEP (Malaysia)		CHA (Thailand)		SUZ (Japan)		FUJ (Japan)		SHA (China)		NIN (China)		Points

Notes

- ^{1} – Shaun Thong was a guest driver at Shanghai and Ningbo and therefore ineligible to score points.

==== Pro-Am Cup ====
Pos.	Driver	Team	SEP (Malaysia)		CHA (Thailand)		SUZ (Japan)		FUJ (Japan)		SHA (China)		NIN (China)		Points
1	(Japan) Hiroshi Hamaguchi (Switzerland) Marco Mapelli	(China) FFF Racing Team by ACM	7	3	4	10	**17**	4	Ret	3	4	2	7	12	186
2	(Japan) Yukinori Taniguchi	(Hong Kong) KCMG	13	7	6	4	6	14	**1**	**4**	Ret	9	10	11	173
3	(Italy) Raffaele Marciello	(Hong Kong) GruppeM Racing Team	3	1			8	6	17	2	14	**3**	14	**21**	155
4	(China) Anthony Liu	(China) Absolute Racing	6	**2**	10	7	29	17	12	13	2	Ret	**Ret**	2	141
5	(Germany) Alexander Mattschull	(Hong Kong) GruppeM Racing Team			**17**	**1**	8	6	17	2	14	**3**	14	**21**	136
6	(Hong Kong) Alexandre Imperatori	(Hong Kong) KCMG					6	14	**1**	**4**	Ret	9	10	11	117
7	(Hong Kong) Adderly Fong (South Korea) Andrew Kim	(China) Absolute Racing	Ret	8	9	15	30	Ret	13	14	**3**	15	4	6	113
8	(Chinese Taipei) Morris Chen	(Chinese Taipei) HubAuto Corsa	**Ret**	17	13	14	10	**Ret**	8	9	11	10	8	13	110
9	(Hong Kong) Josh Burdon	(China) Absolute Racing	6	**2**	10	7	29	17	12	13					91
10	(Australia) Tim Slade	(Chinese Taipei) HubAuto Corsa	**Ret**	17	13	14	10	**Ret**			11	10	8	13	82
11	(Japan) Hiroaki Nagai	(Japan) ARN Racing	9	11	19	12			22	6	13	13	11	Ret	75
12	(Netherlands) Roelof Bruins (South Korea) Juwon Seo	(South Korea) Indigo Racing	Ret	15	12	16	11	20	11	20	12	14			68
13	(Japan) Daisuke Itō	(Japan) ARN Racing	9	11	19	12					13	13	11	Ret	62
14	(Japan) Tsugio Matsuda	(Hong Kong) KCMG	13	7	6	4									56
15	(Belgium) Alessio Picariello	(China) Absolute Racing									2	Ret	**Ret**	2	50
15	(Luxembourg) Brice Bosi	(Hong Kong) GruppeM Racing Team	3	1											50
16	(Japan) Seiji Ara (Japan) Satoshi Hoshino	(Japan) D'station Racing					13	13	16	11					36
17	(Germany) Maximilian Buhk	(Hong Kong) GruppeM Racing Team			**17**	**1**									31
18	(Italy) Davide Rigon	(Chinese Taipei) HubAuto Corsa							8	9					28
19	(Japan) Kei Cozzolino (Japan) Takeshi Kimura	(Japan) CarGuy Racing					16	12	30	18					25
20	(Japan) Naoki Yokomizo	(Japan) Kizashi x Saccess Racing					19	18							18
20	(Japan) Naoki Yokomizo	(Japan) CarGuy Racing							15	32					18
20	(Japan) Naoki Yokomizo	(China) Anstone Racing									17^{1}	18^{1}			18
21	(Singapore) Keong Wee Lim (Malaysia) Alex Yoong	(Hong Kong) Phoenix Racing Asia	12	13											16
22	(Japan) Kota Sasaki	(Japan) ARN Racing							22	6					13
23	(Japan) Tamotsu Kondo	(Japan) Kizashi x Saccess Racing					19	18							10
24	(China) Wei Xu	(Japan) CarGuy Racing							15	32					8
24	(China) Wei Xu	(China) Anstone Racing									17^{1}	18^{1}			8
25	(Japan) Kouichi Okumura (Japan) Daisuke Yamawaki	(Japan) APJ Motorsports							20	25					2
Guest drivers ineligible to score Pro-Am class points
	(New Zealand) Chris van der Drift (China) Chao Li	(China) JRM									15	20			
Pos.	Driver	Team	SEP (Malaysia)		CHA (Thailand)		SUZ (Japan)		FUJ (Japan)		SHA (China)		NIN (China)		Points

Notes

- ^{1} – Wei Xu and Naoki Yokomizo were guest drivers at Shanghai and therefore ineligible to score points.

==== Am Cup ====
Pos.	Driver	Team	SEP (Malaysia)		CHA (Thailand)		SUZ (Japan)		FUJ (Japan)		SHA (China)		NIN (China)		Points
1	(Japan) Takuya Shirasaka (Japan) Naoto Takeda	(Hong Kong) KCMG	14	**16**	**16**	18	14	**16**	**18**	**21**	19	17			205.5
2	(Australia) Andrew Macpherson (Australia) William Ben Porter	(Australia) AMAC Motorsport	15	19	18	**Ret**	18	19	19	23	20	**21**	**13**	**14**	157
3	(Japan) Shinji Takei	(Japan) ARN Racing					**15**	11							73
3	(Japan) Shinji Takei	(Malaysia) Arrows Racing							27	22					73
4	(Hong Kong) Philip Ma	(Malaysia) Arrows Racing	16	20					27	22					57
5	(Japan) Hiroaki Nagai	(Japan) ARN Racing					**15**	11							43
6	(Hong Kong) Jacky Yeung	(Malaysia) Arrows Racing	16	20											27
6	(Japan) Tamotsu Kondo (Japan) Ken Seto	(Japan) Saccess Racing							21	24					27
7	(Malaysia) Adrian Henry D'Silva (Hong Kong) Rick Yoon	(Malaysia) CMRT Eurasia	**Ret**	18											18
Guest drivers ineligible to score Am class points
	(Thailand) Bhurit Bhirombhakdi (China) Jingzu Sun	(Thailand) Singha Plan-B by Absolute Racing									**DNS**	16			
Pos.	Driver	Team	SEP (Malaysia)		CHA (Thailand)		SUZ (Japan)		FUJ (Japan)		SHA (China)		NIN (China)		Points

Notes

- The awarded points in the Am class in both races at Buriram, Race 1 at Shanghai and both races at Ningbo were divided by two, because there were less than three starters.

=== Teams' championship ===
Only the two best results of a team per race counted towards the Teams' championship.

Pos.	Team	Manufacturer	No.	SEP (Malaysia)		CHA (Thailand)		SUZ (Japan)		FUJ (Japan)		SHA (China)		NIN (China)		Points
GT3
1	(China) FFF Racing Team by ACM	Lamborghini	19	**2**	6	5	2	3	1	5	19	**7**	**1**	5	1	268
1	(China) FFF Racing Team by ACM	Lamborghini	63	7	3	4	10	17	4	Ret	3	4	2	7	12	268
2	(Hong Kong) GruppeM Racing Team	Mercedes-AMG	888	3	1	17	**1**	8	6	17	2	14	3	14	**21**	233
2	(Hong Kong) GruppeM Racing Team	Mercedes-AMG	999	1	Ret	**1**	11	5	3	4	1	10	5	**Ret**	Ret	233
3	(China) Absolute Racing (Thailand) Singha Plan-B by Absolute Racing (Note: Car No. 59 was a guest car and therefore results did not count towards the Teams' championship.)	Audi	3	8	4	3	5	**1**	28	6	12	16	4	2	4	213
3	(China) Absolute Racing (Thailand) Singha Plan-B by Absolute Racing	Audi	7	Ret	8	9	15	30	Ret	13	14	3	15	4	6	213
3	(China) Absolute Racing (Thailand) Singha Plan-B by Absolute Racing	Audi	37	6	**2**	10	7	29	17	12	13	2	Ret	Ret	2	213
3	(China) Absolute Racing (Thailand) Singha Plan-B by Absolute Racing	Audi	59									DNS	16			213
4	(Hong Kong) KCMG	Audi; Nissan	18	13	7	6	4	6	14	1	**4**	Ret	9	10	11	176
4	(Hong Kong) KCMG	Audi; Nissan	23	5	9	8	3	Ret	2	**3**	5	6	6	Ret	8	176
4	(Hong Kong) KCMG	Audi; Nissan	45	14	16	16	18	14	16	18	21	19	17			176
5	(Chinese Taipei) HubAuto Corsa	Ferrari	27	4	5	2	6	4	**15**	2	7	1	7	1	10	156
5	(Chinese Taipei) HubAuto Corsa	Ferrari	28	Ret	17	13	14	10	Ret	8	9	11	10	8	13	156
6	(Hong Kong) Craft-Bamboo Racing	Porsche	911	10	12	11	8	2	5	Ret	8	9	8	Ret	Ret	58
6	(Hong Kong) Craft-Bamboo Racing	Porsche	991	11	14	14	17	28	9	14	17	5	12	9	Ret	58
7	(Malaysia) OD Racing Team WRT	Audi	86	Ret	10	7	13	7	7	10	16	8	Ret	6	7	43
8	(South Korea) Indigo Racing	Mercedes-AMG	97	Ret	15	12	16	11	20	11	20	12	14	3	3	30
9	(Hong Kong) (Bentley Team) Phoenix Racing Asia (Note: Car No. 6 was a guest car and therefore results did not count towards the Teams' championship.)	Audi; Bentley	5	12	13	15	9	9	8	7	10	21	29	12	9	21
9	(Hong Kong) (Bentley Team) Phoenix Racing Asia	Audi; Bentley	6									Ret	11	Ret	5	21
10	(Japan) ARN Racing	Ferrari	8	9	11	19	12	15	11	22	6	13	13	11	Ret	11
11	(Japan) Porsche Team EBI	Porsche	33					12	10	9	15					3
	(Japan) D'station Racing	Porsche	47					13	13	16	11					0
	(Japan) CarGuy Racing	Ferrari; Lamborghini	117							15	32					0
	(Japan) CarGuy Racing	Ferrari; Lamborghini	777					16	12	30	18					0
	(Australia) AMAC Motorsport	Lamborghini	51	15	19	18	Ret	18	19	19	23	20	21	13	14	0
	(Malaysia) Arrows Racing	Honda	98	16	20					27	22					0
	(Japan) (Kizashi x) Saccess Racing	Lamborghini	390					19	18	21	24					0
	(Malaysia) CMRT Eurasia	Aston Martin	69	Ret	18											0
	(Japan) APJ Motorsports	Lamborghini	177							20	25					0
Guest teams ineligible to score points
	(China) JRM	Porsche	808									15	20			
	(China) Anstone Racing	Mercedes-AMG	66									18	19			
	(China) Anstone Racing	Mercedes-AMG	71									17	18			
GT4
1	(Japan) BMW Team Studie	BMW	81	20	22	**29**	Ret	20	**24**	**23**	**26**	**23**	**22**	**21**	**15**	344
1	(Japan) BMW Team Studie	BMW	82	22	25	23	21	22	26	28	28	26	23	19	18	344
2	(Hong Kong) GruppeM Racing Team	Mercedes-AMG	666	**17**	23	20	**19**	**21**	21	29	33	22	Ret	15	16	215
3	(Chinese Taipei) Team iRace.Win	Mercedes-AMG	72	19	**21**	26	20	23	22	24	30	24	28	16	17	180
4	(Chinese Taipei) Taiwan Top Speed Racing Team	Porsche	17	24	26	24	23	24	25	26	29	27	26	20	19	118
5	(Hong Kong) TTR Team SARD	Porsche	11	23	27	25	Ret	25	27	25	27	25	24	Ret	DNS	94
6	(Hong Kong) Craft-Bamboo Racing (Note: Car No. 88 was a guest car and therefore results did not count towards the Teams' championship.)	Mercedes-AMG; Porsche	77	18	24	21	22	27	23							79
6	(Hong Kong) Craft-Bamboo Racing	Mercedes-AMG; Porsche	88									29	27	18	20	79
7	(Singapore) Clearwater Racing	McLaren	12	21	28	WD	WD	26	Ret	Ret	31					28
8	(Thailand) JWD Unixx Racing Team	Porsche	22			22	26									19
9	Racing Spirit Thailand	Porsche	80			27	24									12
10	(Thailand) Morseng Racing Team	Porsche	14			28	25									8
Guest teams ineligible to score points
	(Australia) M-Motorsport	KTM	10									28	25	17	Ret	
Pos.	Team	Manufacturer	No.	SEP (Malaysia)		CHA (Thailand)		SUZ (Japan)		FUJ (Japan)		SHA (China)		NIN (China)		Points

== See also ==
- 2018 Blancpain GT Series
- 2018 Blancpain GT Series Endurance Cup
- 2018 Blancpain GT Series Sprint Cup
