= 2017 Blancpain GT Series Asia =

The 2017 Blancpain GT Series Asia was the inaugural season of SRO Motorsports Group and Team Asia One GT Management's Blancpain GT Series Asia, an auto racing series for grand tourer cars in Asia. The races were contested with GT3-spec and GT4-spec cars.

== Calendar ==
On 19 October 2016, the Stéphane Ratel Organisation announced the 2017 calendar and championship details. The series started at Sepang on 8 April and ended at Zhejiang on 15 October, as the event at Zhejiang was moved forward one week, after the 19th National Congress of the Chinese Communist Party.

Event	Circuit	Date
1	Sepang International Circuit, Sepang, Malaysia	8–9 April
2	Chang International Circuit, Buriram, Thailand	20–21 May
3	Suzuka Circuit, Suzuka, Japan	24–25 June
4	Fuji Speedway, Oyama, Japan	19–20 August
5	Shanghai International Circuit, Jiading, China	23–24 September
6	Zhejiang International Circuit, Shaoxing, China	14–15 October

== Entry list ==
=== GT3 ===
Team	Car	No.	Drivers	Class	Rounds
(China) FFF Racing Team by ACM	Lamborghini Huracán GT3	1	(Italy) Alberto Di Folco	S	All
(China) FFF Racing Team by ACM	Lamborghini Huracán GT3	1	(Australia) Aidan Read	S	All
(China) FFF Racing Team by ACM	Lamborghini Huracán GT3	2	(China) Ho-Pin Tung	PA	1
(China) FFF Racing Team by ACM	Lamborghini Huracán GT3	2	(China) Junhan Zhu	PA	1
(China) FFF Racing Team by ACM	Lamborghini Huracán GT3	2	(China) Yue Lin	AA	2–6
(China) FFF Racing Team by ACM	Lamborghini Huracán GT3	2	(China) Junhan Zhu	AA	2–5
(China) FFF Racing Team by ACM	Lamborghini Huracán GT3	2	(China) Ting Zheng	AA	6
(Japan) Porsche Team EBI	Porsche 911 GT3 R	3	(Japan) Yuya Sakamoto	S	4
(Japan) Porsche Team EBI	Porsche 911 GT3 R	3	(Japan) Naoya Yamano	S	4
(Hong Kong) / Audi Hong Kong (Note: Car No. 5 entered as Audi Hong Kong, car No. 6 entered as Audi R8 LMS Cup and car No. 16 entered as Phoenix Racing Asia.); (Hong Kong) / Audi R8 LMS Cup; (Hong Kong) / Phoenix Racing Asia	Audi R8 LMS	5	(Hong Kong) Marchy Lee	S	All
(Hong Kong) / Audi Hong Kong; (Hong Kong) / Audi R8 LMS Cup; (Hong Kong) / Phoenix Racing Asia	Audi R8 LMS	5	(Hong Kong) Shaun Thong	S	All
(Hong Kong) / Audi Hong Kong; (Hong Kong) / Audi R8 LMS Cup; (Hong Kong) / Phoenix Racing Asia	Audi R8 LMS	6	(Hong Kong) Alex Au	PA	All
(Hong Kong) / Audi Hong Kong; (Hong Kong) / Audi R8 LMS Cup; (Hong Kong) / Phoenix Racing Asia	Audi R8 LMS	6	(Malaysia) Alex Yoong	PA	All
(Hong Kong) / Audi Hong Kong; (Hong Kong) / Audi R8 LMS Cup; (Hong Kong) / Phoenix Racing Asia	Audi R8 LMS	16	(Singapore) Keong Wee Lim	PA	6
(Hong Kong) / Audi Hong Kong; (Hong Kong) / Audi R8 LMS Cup; (Hong Kong) / Phoenix Racing Asia	Audi R8 LMS	16	(Malaysia) Melvin Moh	PA	6
(Hong Kong) / J-Fly by Absolute Racing (Note: Car No. 7 entered as J-Fly by Absolute Racing, car No. 13 entered as Milestone Racing and cars No. 20 and 30 entered as Bentley Team Absolute.); (Hong Kong) / Milestone Racing; (Hong Kong) / Bentley Team Absolute	Audi R8 LMS	7	(Chinese Taipei) Jeffrey Lee	PA	2–6
(Hong Kong) / J-Fly by Absolute Racing; (Hong Kong) / Milestone Racing; (Hong Kong) / Bentley Team Absolute	Audi R8 LMS	7	(Belgium) Alessio Picariello	PA	2–6
(Hong Kong) / J-Fly by Absolute Racing; (Hong Kong) / Milestone Racing; (Hong Kong) / Bentley Team Absolute	Audi R8 LMS	13	(China) Franky Cheng	PA	All
(Hong Kong) / J-Fly by Absolute Racing; (Hong Kong) / Milestone Racing; (Hong Kong) / Bentley Team Absolute	Audi R8 LMS	13	(China) Jingzu Sun	PA	All
(Hong Kong) / J-Fly by Absolute Racing; (Hong Kong) / Milestone Racing; (Hong Kong) / Bentley Team Absolute	Bentley Continental GT3	20	(Hong Kong) Adderly Fong	PA	5
(Hong Kong) / J-Fly by Absolute Racing; (Hong Kong) / Milestone Racing; (Hong Kong) / Bentley Team Absolute	Bentley Continental GT3	20	(Thailand) Vutthikorn Inthraphuvasak	PA	5
(Hong Kong) / J-Fly by Absolute Racing; (Hong Kong) / Milestone Racing; (Hong Kong) / Bentley Team Absolute	Bentley Continental GT3	30	(South Korea) Andrew Kim	PA	5
(Hong Kong) / J-Fly by Absolute Racing; (Hong Kong) / Milestone Racing; (Hong Kong) / Bentley Team Absolute	Bentley Continental GT3	30	(Malaysia) Weiron Tan	PA	5
(Belgium) Team WRT	Audi R8 LMS	7	(Chinese Taipei) Jeffrey Lee	PA	1
(Belgium) Team WRT	Audi R8 LMS	7	(United Kingdom) Will Stevens	PA	1
est cola Thailand	Porsche 911 GT3 R	8	(Thailand) Vutthikorn Inthraphuvasak	PA	2
est cola Thailand	Porsche 911 GT3 R	8	(France) Maxime Jousse	PA	2
Singha Motorsport Team Thailand	Ferrari 458 Italia GT3	9	(Thailand) Voravud Bhirombhakdi	PA	2
Singha Motorsport Team Thailand	Ferrari 458 Italia GT3	9	(Netherlands) Carlo van Dam	PA	2
(Singapore) Clearwater Racing	McLaren 650S GT3	12	(United Kingdom) Rob Bell	PA	1
(Singapore) Clearwater Racing	McLaren 650S GT3	12	(Singapore) Richard Wee	PA	1
(Hong Kong) / KCMG (Note: Car No. 18 entered as KCMG at Round 1, but from Round 2 on as KCMG by Champion Racing. Car No. 19 entered as KCMG.); (Hong Kong) / KCMG by Champion Racing	Audi R8 LMS	18	(Estonia) Martin Rump	PA	All
(Hong Kong) / KCMG; (Hong Kong) / KCMG by Champion Racing	Audi R8 LMS	18	(South Korea) Rick Yoon	PA	All
(Hong Kong) / KCMG; (Hong Kong) / KCMG by Champion Racing	Audi R8 LMS	19	(Japan) Takuya Shirasaka	AA	1–5
(Hong Kong) / KCMG; (Hong Kong) / KCMG by Champion Racing	Audi R8 LMS	19	(Japan) Naoto Takeda	AA	1–5
(Switzerland) X-One Motorsports	Lamborghini Huracán GT3	27	(Indonesia) Andrew Haryanto	AA	1, 3–6
(Switzerland) X-One Motorsports	Lamborghini Huracán GT3	27	(Hong Kong) Vincent Wong	AA	1
(Switzerland) X-One Motorsports	Lamborghini Huracán GT3	27	(Hong Kong) Samson Chan	AA	3
(Japan) ARN Racing	Ferrari 488 GT3	28	(Japan) Hiroaki Nagai	PA	3–4
(Japan) ARN Racing	Ferrari 488 GT3	28	(Japan) Kota Sasaki	PA	3–4
(Chinese Taipei) HubAuto Racing	Porsche 911 GT3 R	33	(Chinese Taipei) Brian Lee	PA	5
(Chinese Taipei) HubAuto Racing	Porsche 911 GT3 R	33	(Japan) Hideto Yasuoka	PA	5
(Chinese Taipei) HubAuto Racing	Porsche 911 GT3 R	277	(United Kingdom) Tim Bridgman	S	5
(Chinese Taipei) HubAuto Racing	Porsche 911 GT3 R	277	(China) Leo Ye	S	5
(China) / BBT (Note: Car 37 entered as BBT and cars No. 38 and 39 entered as Spirit of Race.); (China) / Spirit of Race	Ferrari 488 GT3	37	(China) Anthony Liu	PA	1–2
(China) / BBT; (China) / Spirit of Race	Ferrari 488 GT3	37	(Italy) Davide Rizzo	PA	1–2
(China) / BBT; (China) / Spirit of Race	Audi R8 LMS	37	(China) Anthony Liu	PA	4
(China) / BBT; (China) / Spirit of Race	Audi R8 LMS	37	(Italy) Davide Rizzo	PA	4
(China) / BBT; (China) / Spirit of Race	Ferrari 488 GT3	38	(Portugal) Rui Águas	PA	1–4
(China) / BBT; (China) / Spirit of Race	Ferrari 488 GT3	38	(Singapore) Nasrat Muzayyin	PA	1
(China) / BBT; (China) / Spirit of Race	Ferrari 488 GT3	38	(Italy) Rino Mastronardi	PA	2, 4
(China) / BBT; (China) / Spirit of Race	Ferrari 488 GT3	38	(Portugal) Francisco Guedes	PA	3
(China) / BBT; (China) / Spirit of Race	Ferrari 488 GT3	39	(China) Xin Jiang	PA	All
(China) / BBT; (China) / Spirit of Race	Ferrari 488 GT3	39	(Italy) Massimiliano Wiser	PA	All
(Japan) D'station Racing	Porsche 911 GT3 R	47	(Japan) Seiji Ara	PA	3–4
(Japan) D'station Racing	Porsche 911 GT3 R	47	(Japan) Satoshi Hoshino	PA	3–4
(Thailand) Singha Plan-B Motorsport Team	Audi R8 LMS	59	(Thailand) Bhurit Bhirombhakdi	PA	2–3
(Thailand) Singha Plan-B Motorsport Team	Audi R8 LMS	59	(Thailand) Kantasak Kusiri	PA	2–3
(Italy) Vincenzo Sospiri Racing	Lamborghini Huracán GT3	66	(Thailand) Sandy Stuvik	S	All
(Italy) Vincenzo Sospiri Racing	Lamborghini Huracán GT3	66	(Croatia) Martin Kodrić	S	1–2, 4
(Italy) Vincenzo Sospiri Racing	Lamborghini Huracán GT3	66	(Brazil) Nicolas Costa	S	3
(Italy) Vincenzo Sospiri Racing	Lamborghini Huracán GT3	66	(Japan) Yuki Nemoto	S	5
(Italy) Vincenzo Sospiri Racing	Lamborghini Huracán GT3	66	(Germany) Christopher Dreyspring	S	6
(Malaysia) CMRT Eurasia	Aston Martin V12 Vantage GT3	69	(China) James Cai	AA	1–2, 4–6
(Malaysia) CMRT Eurasia	Aston Martin V12 Vantage GT3	69	(Malaysia) Kenneth Lim	AA	1–2, 4–6
(Singapore) T2 Motorsports	Ferrari 488 GT3	75	(Singapore) Gregory Teo	AA	1, 3–5
(Singapore) T2 Motorsports	Ferrari 488 GT3	75	(Indonesia) David Tjiptobiantoro	AA	1, 3–5
(Malaysia) OD Racing Team	Audi R8 LMS	86	(Australia) Mitchell Gilbert	S	All
(Malaysia) OD Racing Team	Audi R8 LMS	86	(India) Aditya Patel	S	All
(China) Spirit Z Racing	Nissan GT-R Nismo GT3 (2017)	87	(China) Sun Zheng	S	All
(China) Spirit Z Racing	Nissan GT-R Nismo GT3 (2017)	87	(China) David Cheng	S	All
(Hong Kong) Craft-Bamboo Racing	Porsche 911 GT3 R	88	(Switzerland) Joël Camathias	S	1
(Hong Kong) Craft-Bamboo Racing	Porsche 911 GT3 R	88	(France) Jules Gounon	S	1
(Hong Kong) Craft-Bamboo Racing	Porsche 911 GT3 R	88	(Thailand) Naiyanobh Bhirombhakdi	PA	2
(Hong Kong) Craft-Bamboo Racing	Porsche 911 GT3 R	88	(New Zealand) Chris van der Drift	PA	2
(Hong Kong) Craft-Bamboo Racing	Porsche 911 GT3 R	88	(United Kingdom) Devon Modell	S	3–6
(Hong Kong) Craft-Bamboo Racing	Porsche 911 GT3 R	88	(Australia) Nick Foster	S	3–5
(Hong Kong) Craft-Bamboo Racing	Porsche 911 GT3 R	88	(New Zealand) Andre Heimgartner	S	6
(Hong Kong) Craft-Bamboo Racing	Porsche 911 GT3 R	99	(Hong Kong) Darryl O'Young	S	All
(Hong Kong) Craft-Bamboo Racing	Porsche 911 GT3 R	99	(China) Peter Li	S	1, 3–4, 6
(Hong Kong) Craft-Bamboo Racing	Porsche 911 GT3 R	99	(United Kingdom) Devon Modell	S	2
(Hong Kong) Craft-Bamboo Racing	Porsche 911 GT3 R	99	(Germany) Marvin Dienst	S	5
(Chinese Taipei) FIST - Team AAI	BMW M6 GT3	90	(China) Yu Lin	AA	1
(Chinese Taipei) FIST - Team AAI	BMW M6 GT3	90	(Chinese Taipei) Jun San Chen	AA	1
(Chinese Taipei) FIST - Team AAI	BMW M6 GT3	90	(Chinese Taipei) Jun San Chen	PA	4
(Chinese Taipei) FIST - Team AAI	BMW M6 GT3	90	(Japan) Shinichi Takagi	PA	4
(Chinese Taipei) FIST - Team AAI	BMW M6 GT3	91	(Finland) Jesse Krohn	S	1, 4
(Chinese Taipei) FIST - Team AAI	BMW M6 GT3	91	(United Kingdom) Ollie Millroy	S	1
(Chinese Taipei) FIST - Team AAI	BMW M6 GT3	91	(United Kingdom) Sean Walkinshaw	S	4
(Chinese Taipei) FIST - Team AAI	BMW M6 GT3	91	(China) Yu Lin	PA	5
(Chinese Taipei) FIST - Team AAI	BMW M6 GT3	91	(Germany) Nico Menzel	PA	5
(Malaysia) Arrows Racing	Porsche 911 GT3 R	98	(Malaysia) Fairuz Fauzy	PA	1
(Malaysia) Arrows Racing	Porsche 911 GT3 R	98	(Hong Kong) Philip Ma	PA	1
(Malaysia) Arrows Racing	Porsche 911 GT3 R	98	(Hong Kong) Philip Ma	AA	3–4
(Malaysia) Arrows Racing	Porsche 911 GT3 R	98	(Hong Kong) Jacky Yeung	AA	3–4
(Malaysia) Arrows Racing	Porsche 911 GT3 R	98	(New Zealand) Earl Bamber	PA	5
(Malaysia) Arrows Racing	Porsche 911 GT3 R	98	(United States) Will Hardeman	PA	5
(Japan) SACCESS Racing	Lamborghini Huracán GT3	390	(Japan) Makio Saitou	PA	4
(Japan) SACCESS Racing	Lamborghini Huracán GT3	390	(Japan) Yuki Urata	PA	4
(Japan) CarGuy Racing	Lamborghini Huracán GT3	777	(Japan) Takeshi Kimura	PA	3
(Japan) CarGuy Racing	Lamborghini Huracán GT3	777	(Italy) Kei Cozzolino	PA	3
(Japan) CarGuy Racing	Lamborghini Huracán GT3	777	(Italy) Kei Cozzolino	S	4
(Japan) CarGuy Racing	Lamborghini Huracán GT3	777	(Japan) Naoki Yokomizo	S	4
(Hong Kong) GruppeM Racing Team	Mercedes-AMG GT3	888	(United Kingdom) Tim Sugden	S	All
(Hong Kong) GruppeM Racing Team	Mercedes-AMG GT3	888	(Netherlands) Jules Szymkowiak	S	All
(Hong Kong) GruppeM Racing Team	Mercedes-AMG GT3	999	(United Kingdom) Hunter Abbott	PA	All
(Hong Kong) GruppeM Racing Team	Mercedes-AMG GT3	999	(Italy) Raffaele Marciello	PA	1
(Hong Kong) GruppeM Racing Team	Mercedes-AMG GT3	999	(Germany) Maximilian Buhk	PA	2, 4–6
(Hong Kong) GruppeM Racing Team	Mercedes-AMG GT3	999	(Germany) Maximilian Götz	PA	3

Icon	Class
PA	Pro-Am
S	Silver
AA	Am-Am
Inv	Invitational

=== GT4 ===
Team	Car	No.	Drivers	Class	Rounds
(Malaysia) EKS Motorsports	Porsche Cayman GT4 Clubsport MR	10	(Hong Kong) Eric Lo	AA	All
(Malaysia) EKS Motorsports	Porsche Cayman GT4 Clubsport MR	10	(Hong Kong) Byron Tong	AA	All
(Malaysia) EKS Motorsports	Porsche Cayman GT4 Clubsport MR	117	(Malaysia) Nazim Azman	Inv	1
(Malaysia) EKS Motorsports	Porsche Cayman GT4 Clubsport MR	117	(Germany) Swen Herberger	Inv	1
(Hong Kong) TTR Team SARD	Porsche Cayman GT4 Clubsport MR	11	(Hong Kong) Tony Fong	AA	All
(Hong Kong) TTR Team SARD	Porsche Cayman GT4 Clubsport MR	11	(Hong Kong) Terence Tse	AA	All
(Singapore) Clearwater Racing	McLaren 570S GT4	12	(Singapore) Weng Sun Mok	AA	4
(Singapore) Clearwater Racing	McLaren 570S GT4	12	(Singapore) Richard Wee	AA	4
(Chinese Taipei) Taiwan Top Speed Racing Team	Porsche Cayman GT4 Clubsport MR	17	(Chinese Taipei) Keo Chang	AA	All
(Chinese Taipei) Taiwan Top Speed Racing Team	Porsche Cayman GT4 Clubsport MR	17	(Chinese Taipei) Jeremy Wang	AA	1–2, 4, 6
(Chinese Taipei) Taiwan Top Speed Racing Team	Porsche Cayman GT4 Clubsport MR	17	(Chinese Taipei) George Chou	AA	3
(Chinese Taipei) Taiwan Top Speed Racing Team	Porsche Cayman GT4 Clubsport MR	17	(Chinese Taipei) Jeff Lu	AA	5
(Hong Kong) Craft-Bamboo Racing	Porsche Cayman GT4 Clubsport MR	77	(France) Jean-Marc Merlin	AA	All
(Hong Kong) Craft-Bamboo Racing	Porsche Cayman GT4 Clubsport MR	77	(Hong Kong) Frank Yu	AA	All
(Chinese Taipei) HubAuto Racing	Porsche Cayman GT4 Clubsport MR	89	(Singapore) Ringo Chong	AA	All
(Chinese Taipei) HubAuto Racing	Porsche Cayman GT4 Clubsport MR	89	(Australia) Alan Yeo	AA	1
(Chinese Taipei) HubAuto Racing	Porsche Cayman GT4 Clubsport MR	89	(Malaysia) Douglas Khoo	AA	2
(Chinese Taipei) HubAuto Racing	Porsche Cayman GT4 Clubsport MR	89	(Japan) Masahiko Ida	AA	3
(Chinese Taipei) HubAuto Racing	Porsche Cayman GT4 Clubsport MR	89	(China) Kan Zang	AA	4, 6
(Chinese Taipei) HubAuto Racing	Porsche Cayman GT4 Clubsport MR	89	(Hong Kong) James Wong	AA	5

== Race results ==
Bold indicates overall winner.

Round		Circuit	Pole position	Pro-Am Winners	Silver Winners	Am-Am Winners	GT4 Winners
1	R1	(Malaysia) Sepang	(Malaysia) No. 86 OD Racing Team	(Hong Kong) No. 999 GruppeM Racing Team	**(Malaysia) No. 86 OD Racing Team**	(Hong Kong) No. 19 KCMG	(Hong Kong) No. 77 Craft-Bamboo Racing
1	R1	(Malaysia) Sepang	(Australia) Mitchell Gilbert (India) Aditya Patel	(United Kingdom) Hunter Abbott (Italy) Raffaele Marciello	**(Australia) Mitchell Gilbert** **(India) Aditya Patel**	(Japan) Takuya Shirasaka (Japan) Naoto Takeda	(France) Jean-Marc Merlin (Hong Kong) Frank Yu
1	R2	(Malaysia) Sepang	(Hong Kong) No. 6 Audi R8 LMS Cup	**(China) No. 37 BBT**	(Malaysia) No. 86 OD Racing Team	(Singapore) No. 75 T2 Motorsports	(Malaysia) No. 10 EKS Motorsports
1	R2	(Malaysia) Sepang	(Hong Kong) Alex Au (Malaysia) Alex Yoong	**(China) Anthony Liu** **(Italy) Davide Rizzo**	(Australia) Mitchell Gilbert (India) Aditya Patel	(Singapore) Gregory Teo (Indonesia) David Tjiptobiantoro	(Hong Kong) Eric Lo (Hong Kong) Byron Tong
2	R1	(Thailand) Buriram	(China) No. 37 BBT	**(China) No. 38 Spirit of Race**	No. 5 Audi Hong Kong	(Hong Kong) No. 19 KCMG	(Chinese Taipei) No. 17 Taiwan Top Speed Racing Team
2	R1	(Thailand) Buriram	(China) Anthony Liu (Italy) Davide Rizzo	**(Portugal) Rui Águas** **(Italy) Rino Mastronardi**	(Hong Kong) Marchy Lee (Hong Kong) Shaun Thong	(Japan) Takuya Shirasaka (Japan) Naoto Takeda	(Chinese Taipei) Keo Chang (Chinese Taipei) Jeremy Wang
2	R2	(Thailand) Buriram	(Hong Kong) No. 7 J-Fly by Absolute Racing	**(Hong Kong) No. 999 GruppeM Racing Team**	No. 5 Audi Hong Kong	(Malaysia) No. 69 CMRT Eurasia	(Hong Kong) No. 77 Craft-Bamboo Racing
2	R2	(Thailand) Buriram	(Chinese Taipei) Jeffrey Lee (Belgium) Alessio Picariello	**(United Kingdom) Hunter Abbott** **(Germany) Maximilian Buhk**	(Hong Kong) Marchy Lee (Hong Kong) Shaun Thong	(China) James Cai (Malaysia) Kenneth Lim	(France) Jean-Marc Merlin (Hong Kong) Frank Yu
3	R1	(Japan) Suzuka	(Hong Kong) No. 99 Craft-Bamboo Racing	(China) No. 38 Spirit of Race	**No. 5 Audi Hong Kong**	(Switzerland) No. 27 X-One Motorsports	(Hong Kong) No. 77 Craft-Bamboo Racing
3	R1	(Japan) Suzuka	(China) Peter Li (Hong Kong) Darryl O'Young	(Portugal) Rui Águas (Portugal) Francisco Guedes	**(Hong Kong) Marchy Lee** **(Hong Kong) Shaun Thong**	(Hong Kong) Samson Chan (Indonesia) Andrew Haryanto	(France) Jean-Marc Merlin (Hong Kong) Frank Yu
3	R2	(Japan) Suzuka	(Hong Kong) No. 7 J-Fly by Absolute Racing	**(Hong Kong) No. 999 GruppeM Racing Team**	(Italy) No. 66 Vincenzo Sospiri Racing	(Switzerland) No. 27 X-One Motorsports	(Chinese Taipei) No. 17 Taiwan Top Speed Racing Team
3	R2	(Japan) Suzuka	(Chinese Taipei) Jeffrey Lee (Belgium) Alessio Picariello	**(United Kingdom) Hunter Abbott** **(Germany) Maximilian Götz**	(Brazil) Nicolas Costa (Thailand) Sandy Stuvik	(Hong Kong) Samson Chan (Indonesia) Andrew Haryanto	(Chinese Taipei) Keo Chang (Chinese Taipei) George Chou
4	R1	(Japan) Fuji	(Hong Kong) No. 88 Craft-Bamboo Racing	(Hong Kong) No. 999 GruppeM Racing Team	**(Japan) No. 777 CarGuy Racing**	(Switzerland) No. 27 X-One Motorsports	(Singapore) No. 12 Clearwater Racing
4	R1	(Japan) Fuji	(Australia) Nick Foster (United Kingdom) Devon Modell	(United Kingdom) Hunter Abbott (Germany) Maximilian Buhk	**(Italy) Kei Cozzolino** **(Japan) Naoki Yokomizo**	(Indonesia) Andrew Haryanto	(Singapore) Weng Sun Mok (Singapore) Richard Wee
4	R2	(Japan) Fuji	(China) No. 39 Spirit of Race	**(Hong Kong) No. 999 GruppeM Racing Team**	No. 5 Audi Hong Kong	(Switzerland) No. 27 X-One Motorsports	(Singapore) No. 12 Clearwater Racing
4	R2	(Japan) Fuji	(China) Xin Jiang (Italy) Massimiliano Wiser	**(United Kingdom) Hunter Abbott** **(Germany) Maximilian Buhk**	(Hong Kong) Marchy Lee (Hong Kong) Shaun Thong	(Indonesia) Andrew Haryanto	(Singapore) Weng Sun Mok (Singapore) Richard Wee
5	R1	(China) Shanghai	(Italy) No. 66 Vincenzo Sospiri Racing	(Hong Kong) No. 6 Audi R8 LMS Cup	**No. 5 Audi Hong Kong**	(Switzerland) No. 27 X-One Motorsports	(Hong Kong) No. 77 Craft-Bamboo Racing
5	R1	(China) Shanghai	(Japan) Yuki Nemoto (Thailand) Sandy Stuvik	(Hong Kong) Alex Au (Malaysia) Alex Yoong	**(Hong Kong) Marchy Lee** **(Hong Kong) Shaun Thong**	(Indonesia) Andrew Haryanto	(France) Jean-Marc Merlin (Hong Kong) Frank Yu
5	R2	(China) Shanghai	(Hong Kong) No. 7 J-Fly by Absolute Racing	(Hong Kong) No. 6 Audi R8 LMS Cup	**(Hong Kong) No. 99 Craft-Bamboo Racing**	(China) No. 2 FFF Racing Team by ACM	(Chinese Taipei) No. 17 Taiwan Top Speed Racing Team
5	R2	(China) Shanghai	(Chinese Taipei) Jeffrey Lee (Belgium) Alessio Picariello	(Hong Kong) Alex Au (Malaysia) Alex Yoong	**(Germany) Marvin Dienst** **(Hong Kong) Darryl O'Young**	(China) Yue Lin (China) Junhan Zhu	(Chinese Taipei) Keo Chang (Chinese Taipei) Jeff Lu
6	R1	(China) Zhejiang	(Italy) No. 66 Vincenzo Sospiri Racing	(Hong Kong) No. 999 GruppeM Racing Team	**(Malaysia) No. 86 OD Racing Team**	(Malaysia) No. 69 CMRT Eurasia	(Hong Kong) No. 77 Craft-Bamboo Racing
6	R1	(China) Zhejiang	(Germany) Christopher Dreyspring (Thailand) Sandy Stuvik	(United Kingdom) Hunter Abbott (Germany) Maximilian Buhk	**(Australia) Mitchell Gilbert** **(India) Aditya Patel**	(China) James Cai (Malaysia) Kenneth Lim	(France) Jean-Marc Merlin (Hong Kong) Frank Yu
6	R2	(China) Zhejiang	(Malaysia) No. 86 OD Racing Team	(Hong Kong) No. 18 KCMG by Champion Racing	**(Malaysia) No. 86 OD Racing Team**	(Malaysia) No. 69 CMRT Eurasia	(Chinese Taipei) No. 89 HubAuto Racing
6	R2	(China) Zhejiang	(Australia) Mitchell Gilbert (India) Aditya Patel	(Estonia) Martin Rump (South Korea) Rick Yoon	**(Australia) Mitchell Gilbert** **(India) Aditya Patel**	(China) James Cai (Malaysia) Kenneth Lim	(Singapore) Ringo Chong (China) Kan Zang

== Championship standings ==
Scoring system

Championship points were awarded for the first ten positions in each race. Entries were required to complete 75% of the winning car's race distance in order to be classified and earn points. Individual drivers were required to participate for a minimum of 25 minutes in order to earn championship points in any race.

Position	**1st**	**2nd**	**3rd**	**4th**	**5th**	**6th**	**7th**	**8th**	**9th**	**10th**
Points	25	18	15	12	10	8	6	4	2	1

=== Drivers' championships ===
==== Overall ====
Pos.	Driver	Team	SEP (Malaysia)		CHA (Thailand)		SUZ (Japan)		FUJ (Japan)		SHA (China)		ZHE (China)		Points
GT3
1	(United Kingdom) Hunter Abbott	(Hong Kong) GruppeM Racing Team	2	4	6	1	7	1	3	1	24	Ret	3	4	161
2	(Australia) Mitchell Gilbert (India) Aditya Patel	(Malaysia) OD Racing Team	**1**	2	Ret	3	3	Ret	11	8	2	3	1	**1**	160
3	(Hong Kong) Marchy Lee (Hong Kong) Shaun Thong	Audi Hong Kong	5	3	2	2	1	14	17	3	1	5	4	6	158
4	(Germany) Maximilian Buhk	(Hong Kong) GruppeM Racing Team			6	1			3	1	24	Ret	3	4	100
5	(United Kingdom) Tim Sugden (Netherlands) Jules Szymkowiak	(Hong Kong) GruppeM Racing Team	4	5	DNS	8	14	6	5	6	7	6	5	9	82
6	(Thailand) Sandy Stuvik	(Italy) Vincenzo Sospiri Racing	8	16	Ret	DNS	8	2	4	24	**4**	8	**10**	5	67
7	(United Kingdom) Devon Modell	(Hong Kong) Craft-Bamboo Racing			11	9	2	8	**2**	11	Ret	9	9	2	66
8	(Hong Kong) Darryl O'Young	(Hong Kong) Craft-Bamboo Racing	17	11	11	9	**4**	4	10	12	6	1	12	DNS	62
8	(Italy) Alberto Di Folco (Australia) Aidan Read	(China) FFF Racing Team by ACM	16	6	12	6	12	5	9	14	11	7	2	7	62
9	(Hong Kong) Alex Au (Malaysia) Alex Yoong	(Hong Kong) Audi R8 LMS Cup	10	**9**	3	Ret	10	9	Ret	9	3	2	11	8	60
10	(Portugal) Rui Águas	(China) Spirit of Race	12	18	1	Ret	5	7	Ret	2					59
11	(Chinese Taipei) Jeffrey Lee	(Belgium) Team WRT	11	8											50
11	(Chinese Taipei) Jeffrey Lee	(Hong Kong) J-Fly by Absolute Racing			4	**5**	13	**3**	12	Ret	25	**11**	7	10	50
12	(Belgium) Alessio Picariello	(Hong Kong) J-Fly by Absolute Racing			4	**5**	13	**3**	12	Ret	25	**11**	7	10	46
13	(Australia) Nick Foster	(Hong Kong) Craft-Bamboo Racing					2	8	**2**	11	Ret	9			44
14	(Italy) Rino Mastronardi	(China) Spirit of Race			1	Ret			Ret	2					43
14	(China) Xin Jiang (Italy) Massimiliano Wiser	(China) Spirit of Race	6	10	8	4	9	Ret	Ret	**5**	8	17	Ret	DNS	43
15	(Germany) Marvin Dienst	(Hong Kong) Craft-Bamboo Racing									6	1			35
16	(China) Anthony Liu (Italy) Davide Rizzo	(China) BBT	13	1	**Ret**	Ret			6	13					33
17	(Germany) Maximilian Götz	(Hong Kong) GruppeM Racing Team					7	1							31
18	(Italy) Raffaele Marciello	(Hong Kong) GruppeM Racing Team	2	4											30
19	(Estonia) Martin Rump (South Korea) Rick Yoon	(Hong Kong) KCMG	DNS	13											29
19	(Estonia) Martin Rump (South Korea) Rick Yoon	(Hong Kong) KCMG by Champion Racing			5	Ret	16	Ret	Ret	16	DNS	DNS	8	3	29
20	(Italy) Kei Cozzolino	(Japan) CarGuy Racing					15	12	1	15					25
20	(Japan) Naoki Yokomizo	(Japan) CarGuy Racing							1	15					25
20	(China) Peter Li	(Hong Kong) Craft-Bamboo Racing	17	11			**4**	4	10	12			12	DNS	25
21	(Brazil) Nicolas Costa	(Italy) Vincenzo Sospiri Racing					8	2							22
22	(New Zealand) Andre Heimgartner	(Hong Kong) Craft-Bamboo Racing											9	2	20
22	(Japan) Hiroaki Nagai (Japan) Kota Sasaki	(Japan) ARN Racing					6	Ret	21	4					20
23	(Japan) Yuki Nemoto	(Italy) Vincenzo Sospiri Racing									**4**	8			18
24	(Croatia) Martin Kodrić	(Italy) Vincenzo Sospiri Racing	8	16	Ret	DNS			4	24					16
24	(Portugal) Francisco Guedes	(China) Spirit of Race					5	7							16
25	(Finland) Jesse Krohn	(Chinese Taipei) FIST - Team AAI	3	26					14	Ret					15
25	(United Kingdom) Ollie Millroy	(Chinese Taipei) FIST - Team AAI	3	26											15
25	(China) Franky Cheng (China) Jingzu Sun	(Hong Kong) Milestone Racing	9	12	DNS	12	Ret	16	16	17	10	13	6	12	15
26	(Switzerland) Joël Camathias (France) Jules Gounon	(Hong Kong) Craft-Bamboo Racing	7	7											12
26	(Thailand) Voravud Bhirombhakdi (Netherlands) Carlo van Dam	Singha Motorsport Team Thailand			7	7									12
27	(Germany) Christopher Dreyspring	(Italy) Vincenzo Sospiri Racing											**10**	5	11
28	(Japan) Seiji Ara (Japan) Satoshi Hoshino	(Japan) D'station Racing					27	18	8	7					10
29	(Japan) Yuya Sakamoto (Japan) Naoya Yamano	(Japan) Porsche Team EBI							7	10					7
30	(United Kingdom) Will Stevens	(Belgium) Team WRT	11	8											4
31	(Thailand) Vutthikorn Inthraphuvasak	est cola Thailand			9	10									3
31	(Thailand) Vutthikorn Inthraphuvasak	(Hong Kong) Bentley Team Absolute									5^{1}	12^{1}			3
31	(France) Maxime Jousse	est cola Thailand			9	10									3
32	(Indonesia) Andrew Haryanto	(Switzerland) X-One Motorsports	DNS	DNS			17	10	15	18	12	20	15	15	2
33	(Thailand) Naiyanobh Bhirombhakdi (New Zealand) Chris van der Drift	(Hong Kong) Craft-Bamboo Racing			10	13									1
33	(Hong Kong) Samson Chan	(Switzerland) X-One Motorsports					17	10							1
	(Thailand) Bhurit Bhirombhakdi (Thailand) Kantasak Kusiri	(Thailand) Singha Plan-B Motorsport Team			13	11	11	11							0
	(China) James Cai (Malaysia) Kenneth Lim	(Malaysia) CMRT Eurasia	20	19	16	14			29	21	14	21	14	11	0
	(Japan) Takeshi Kimura	(Japan) CarGuy Racing					15	12							0
	(Singapore) Nasrat Muzayyin	(China) Spirit of Race	12	18											0
	(Singapore) Gregory Teo (Indonesia) David Tjiptobiantoro	(Singapore) T2 Motorsports	19	14			18	13	19	22	17	Ret			0
	(Chinese Taipei) Jun San Chen	(Chinese Taipei) FIST - Team AAI	Ret	DNS					13	19					0
	(Japan) Shinichi Takagi	(Chinese Taipei) FIST - Team AAI							13	19					0
	(China) Yue Lin	(China) FFF Racing Team by ACM			15	18	20	15	20	23	15	16	16	14	0
	(Japan) Takuya Shirasaka (Japan) Naoto Takeda	(Hong Kong) KCMG	18	15	14	Ret	19	19	30	Ret	16	19			0
	(China) Ting Zheng	(China) FFF Racing Team by ACM											16	14	0
	(Hong Kong) Philip Ma	(Malaysia) Arrows Racing	14	17			21	17	22	25					0
	(Malaysia) Fairuz Fauzy	(Malaysia) Arrows Racing	14	17											0
	(United Kingdom) Sean Walkinshaw	(Chinese Taipei) FIST - Team AAI							14	Ret					0
	(China) Junhan Zhu	(China) FFF Racing Team by ACM	15	27	15	18	20	15	20	23	15	16			0
	(China) Ho-Pin Tung	(China) FFF Racing Team by ACM	15	27											0
	(Hong Kong) Jacky Yeung	(Malaysia) Arrows Racing					21	17	22	25					0
	(Japan) Makio Saitou (Japan) Yuki Urata	(Japan) SACCESS Racing							18	20					0
	(United Kingdom) Rob Bell (Singapore) Richard Wee	(Singapore) Clearwater Racing	Ret	DNS											
	(China) Yu Lin	(Chinese Taipei) FIST - Team AAI	Ret	DNS							18^{1}	18^{1}			
	(Hong Kong) Vincent Wong	(Switzerland) X-One Motorsports	DNS	DNS											
Guest drivers ineligible to score points
	(New Zealand) Earl Bamber (United States) Will Hardeman	(Malaysia) Arrows Racing									19	4			
	(Hong Kong) Adderly Fong	(Hong Kong) Bentley Team Absolute									5	12			
	(United Kingdom) Tim Bridgman (China) Leo Ye	(Chinese Taipei) HubAuto Racing									9	10			
	(Singapore) Keong Wee Lim (Malaysia) Melvin Moh	(Hong Kong) Phoenix Racing Asia											13	13	
	(Chinese Taipei) Brian Lee (Japan) Hideto Yasuoka	(Chinese Taipei) HubAuto Racing									13	14			
	(South Korea) Andrew Kim (Malaysia) Weiron Tan	(Hong Kong) Bentley Team Absolute									Ret	15			
	(Germany) Nico Menzel	(Chinese Taipei) FIST - Team AAI									18	18			
GT4
1	(France) Jean-Marc Merlin (Hong Kong) Frank Yu	(Hong Kong) Craft-Bamboo Racing	22	**22**	**EX**	15	22	**24**	24	28	20	**25**	**17**	**17**	216
2	(Hong Kong) Eric Lo (Hong Kong) Byron Tong	(Malaysia) EKS Motorsports	**23**	21	18	**16**	25	21	26	29	21	26	21	18	186
3	(Chinese Taipei) Keo Chang	(Chinese Taipei) Taiwan Top Speed Racing Team	25	25	17	17	**23**	20	27	30	26	22	19	20	185
4	(Singapore) Ringo Chong	(Chinese Taipei) HubAuto Racing	24	23	Ret	19	24	23	25	27	**22**	24	18	16	175
5	(Hong Kong) Tony Fong (Hong Kong) Terence Tse	(Hong Kong) TTR Team SARD	26	24	Ret	DNS	26	22	28	Ret	23	23	20	19	109
6	(Chinese Taipei) Jeremy Wang	(Chinese Taipei) Taiwan Top Speed Racing Team	25	25	17	17			27	30			19	20	107
7	(China) Kan Zang	(Chinese Taipei) HubAuto Racing							25	27			18	16	76
8	(Singapore) Weng Sun Mok (Singapore) Richard Wee	(Singapore) Clearwater Racing							**23**	**26**					50
9	(Chinese Taipei) George Chou	(Chinese Taipei) Taiwan Top Speed Racing Team					**23**	20							43
10	(Chinese Taipei) Jeff Lu	(Chinese Taipei) Taiwan Top Speed Racing Team									26	22			35
11	(Australia) Alan Yeo	(Chinese Taipei) HubAuto Racing	24	23											30
11	(Hong Kong) James Wong	(Chinese Taipei) HubAuto Racing									**22**	24			30
12	(Japan) Masahiko Ida	(Chinese Taipei) HubAuto Racing					24	23							27
13	(Malaysia) Douglas Khoo	(Chinese Taipei) HubAuto Racing	24	23	Ret	19									12
GT4 Invitational
	(Malaysia) Nazim Azman (Germany) Swen Herberger	(Malaysia) EKS Motorsports	21	20											
Pos.	Driver	Team	SEP (Malaysia)		CHA (Thailand)		SUZ (Japan)		FUJ (Japan)		SHA (China)		ZHE (China)		Points

Key
Colour	Result
Gold	Race winner
Silver	2nd place
Bronze	3rd place
Green	Points finish
Blue	Non-points finish
Blue	Non-classified finish (NC)
Purple	Did not finish (Ret)
Black	Disqualified (DSQ)
Black	Excluded (EX)
White	Did not start (DNS)
White	Race cancelled (C)
White	Withdrew (WD)
Blank	Did not participate

**Bold** – Pole
Italics – Fastest Lap

Notes

- ^{1} – Vutthikorn Inthraphuvasak and Yu Lin were guest drivers in Shanghai and therefore ineligible to score points.

==== Pro-Am ====
Pos.	Driver	Team	SEP (Malaysia)		CHA (Thailand)		SUZ (Japan)		FUJ (Japan)		SHA (China)		ZHE (China)		Points
1	(United Kingdom) Hunter Abbott	(Hong Kong) GruppeM Racing Team	2	4	6	1	**7**	1	3	1	24	Ret	**3**	4	223
2	(Hong Kong) Alex Au (Malaysia) Alex Yoong	(Hong Kong) Audi R8 LMS Cup	10	**9**	3	Ret	10	9	Ret	9	**3**	2	11	8	147
3	(Chinese Taipei) Jeffrey Lee	(Belgium) Team WRT	11	8											146
3	(Chinese Taipei) Jeffrey Lee	(Hong Kong) J-Fly by Absolute Racing			4	**5**	13	**3**	12	Ret	25	**11**	7	10	146
4	(Germany) Maximilian Buhk	(Hong Kong) GruppeM Racing Team			6	1			3	1	24	Ret	**3**	4	140
5	(Belgium) Alessio Picariello	(Hong Kong) J-Fly by Absolute Racing			4	**5**	13	**3**	12	Ret	25	**11**	7	10	121
6	(China) Xin Jiang (Italy) Massimiliano Wiser	(China) Spirit of Race	6	10	8	4	9	Ret	Ret	**5**	8	17	Ret	DNS	106
7	(China) Franky Cheng (China) Jingzu Sun	(Hong Kong) Milestone Racing	9	12	DNS	12	Ret	16	16	17	10	13	6	12	103
8	(Portugal) Rui Águas	(China) Spirit of Race	12	18	1	Ret	5	7	**Ret**	2					93
9	(Estonia) Martin Rump (South Korea) Rick Yoon	(Hong Kong) KCMG	DNS	13											61
9	(Estonia) Martin Rump (South Korea) Rick Yoon	(Hong Kong) KCMG by Champion Racing			5	Ret	16	Ret	Ret	16	DNS	DNS	8	**3**	61
10	(China) Anthony Liu (Italy) Davide Rizzo	(China) BBT	**13**	1	**Ret**	Ret			6	13					55
11	(Italy) Rino Mastronardi	(China) Spirit of Race			1	Ret			**Ret**	2					43
11	(Italy) Raffaele Marciello	(Hong Kong) GruppeM Racing Team	2	4											43
12	(Portugal) Francisco Guedes	(China) Spirit of Race					5	7							40
12	(Germany) Maximilian Götz	(Hong Kong) GruppeM Racing Team					**7**	1							40
13	(Japan) Hiroaki Nagai (Japan) Kota Sasaki	(Japan) ARN Racing					6	Ret	21	4					37
14	(Japan) Seiji Ara (Japan) Satoshi Hoshino	(Japan) D'station Racing					27	18	8	7					30
15	(Thailand) Bhurit Bhirombhakdi (Thailand) Kantasak Kusiri	(Thailand) Singha Plan-B Motorsport Team			13	11	11	11							27
16	(United Kingdom) Will Stevens	(Belgium) Team WRT	11	8											25
17	(Thailand) Voravud Bhirombhakdi (Netherlands) Carlo van Dam	Singha Motorsport Team Thailand			7	7									20
18	(Thailand) Vutthikorn Inthraphuvasak	est cola Thailand			9	10									14
18	(Thailand) Vutthikorn Inthraphuvasak	(Hong Kong) Bentley Team Absolute									5^{1}	12^{1}			14
18	(France) Maxime Jousse	est cola Thailand			9	10									14
19	(Italy) Kei Cozzolino (Japan) Takeshi Kimura	(Japan) CarGuy Racing					15	12							12
20	(Chinese Taipei) Jun San Chen (Japan) Shinichi Takagi	(Chinese Taipei) FIST - Team AAI							13	19					11
21	(Singapore) Nasrat Muzayyin	(China) Spirit of Race	12	18											10
22	(Malaysia) Fairuz Fauzy (Hong Kong) Philip Ma	(Malaysia) Arrows Racing	14	17											8
23	(Japan) Makio Saitou (Japan) Yuki Urata	(Japan) SACCESS Racing							18	20					6
23	(Thailand) Naiyanobh Bhirombhakdi (New Zealand) Chris van der Drift	(Hong Kong) Craft-Bamboo Racing			10	13									6
24	(China) Junhan Zhu (China) Ho-Pin Tung	(China) FFF Racing Team by ACM	15	27											3
	(United Kingdom) Rob Bell (Singapore) Richard Wee	(Singapore) Clearwater Racing	Ret	DNS											
Guest drivers ineligible to score Pro-Am class points
	(Hong Kong) Adderly Fong	(Hong Kong) Bentley Team Absolute									5	12			
	(New Zealand) Earl Bamber (United States) Will Hardeman	(Malaysia) Arrows Racing									19	4			
	(Chinese Taipei) Brian Lee (Japan) Hideto Yasuoka	(Chinese Taipei) HubAuto Racing									13	14			
	(South Korea) Andrew Kim (Malaysia) Weiron Tan	(Hong Kong) Bentley Team Absolute									Ret	15			
	(Singapore) Keong Wee Lim (Malaysia) Melvin Moh	(Hong Kong) Phoenix Racing Asia											13	13	
	(China) Yu Lin (Germany) Nico Menzel	(Chinese Taipei) FIST - Team AAI									18	18			
Pos.	Driver	Team	SEP (Malaysia)		CHA (Thailand)		SUZ (Japan)		FUJ (Japan)		SHA (China)		ZHE (China)		Points

Notes

- ^{1} – Vutthikorn Inthraphuvasak was a guest driver in Shanghai and therefore ineligible to score Pro-Am class points.

==== Silver ====
Pos.	Driver	Team	SEP (Malaysia)		CHA (Thailand)		SUZ (Japan)		FUJ (Japan)		SHA (China)		ZHE (China)		Points
1	(Hong Kong) Marchy Lee (Hong Kong) Shaun Thong	Audi Hong Kong	5	3	2	**2**	1	14	17	3	1	5	4	6	206
2	(Australia) Mitchell Gilbert (India) Aditya Patel	(Malaysia) OD Racing Team	**1**	2	**Ret**	3	3	**Ret**	11	8	2	3	1	**1**	188
3	(United Kingdom) Tim Sugden (Netherlands) Jules Szymkowiak	(Hong Kong) GruppeM Racing Team	4	**5**	DNS	8	14	6	5	**6**	7	6	5	9	132
4	(Italy) Alberto Di Folco (Australia) Aidan Read	(China) FFF Racing Team by ACM	16	6	12	6	12	5	9	14	11	7	2	7	131
5	(Hong Kong) Darryl O'Young	(Hong Kong) Craft-Bamboo Racing	17	11	11	9	**4**	4	10	12	6	**1**	12	DNS	127
6	(United Kingdom) Devon Modell	(Hong Kong) Craft-Bamboo Racing			11	9	2	8	**2**	11	Ret	9	9	2	118
7	(Thailand) Sandy Stuvik	(Italy) Vincenzo Sospiri Racing	8	16	Ret	DNS	8	2	4	24	**4**	8	**10**	5	112
8	(Australia) Nick Foster	(Hong Kong) Craft-Bamboo Racing					2	8	**2**	11	Ret	9			62
8	(China) Peter Li	(Hong Kong) Craft-Bamboo Racing	17	11			**4**	4	10	12			12	DNS	62
9	(Germany) Marvin Dienst	(Hong Kong) Craft-Bamboo Racing									6	**1**			37
10	(Brazil) Nicolas Costa	(Italy) Vincenzo Sospiri Racing					8	2							35
11	(Croatia) Martin Kodrić	(Italy) Vincenzo Sospiri Racing	8	16	Ret	DNS			4	24					31
12	(Italy) Kei Cozzolino (Japan) Naoki Yokomizo	(Japan) CarGuy Racing							1	15					29
13	(New Zealand) Andre Heimgartner	(Hong Kong) Craft-Bamboo Racing											9	2	28
14	(Finland) Jesse Krohn	(Chinese Taipei) FIST - Team AAI	3	26					14	Ret					24
15	(Japan) Yuki Nemoto	(Italy) Vincenzo Sospiri Racing									**4**	8			23
15	(Germany) Christopher Dreyspring	(Italy) Vincenzo Sospiri Racing											**10**	5	23
16	(United Kingdom) Ollie Millroy	(Chinese Taipei) FIST - Team AAI	3	26											22
16	(Japan) Yuya Sakamoto (Japan) Naoya Yamano	(Japan) Porsche Team EBI							7	10					22
17	(Switzerland) Joël Camathias (France) Jules Gounon	(Hong Kong) Craft-Bamboo Racing	7	7											20
18	(United Kingdom) Sean Walkinshaw	(Chinese Taipei) FIST - Team AAI							14	Ret					2
Guest drivers ineligible to score Silver class points
	(United Kingdom) Tim Bridgman (China) Leo Ye	(Chinese Taipei) HubAuto Racing									9	10			
Pos.	Driver	Team	SEP (Malaysia)		CHA (Thailand)		SUZ (Japan)		FUJ (Japan)		SHA (China)		ZHE (China)		Points

==== Am-Am ====
Pos.	Driver	Team	SEP (Malaysia)		CHA (Thailand)		SUZ (Japan)		FUJ (Japan)		SHA (China)		ZHE (China)		Points
1	(China) James Cai (Malaysia) Kenneth Lim	(Malaysia) CMRT Eurasia	20	19	16	14			29	21	14	21	14	11	178
2	(Indonesia) Andrew Haryanto	(Switzerland) X-One Motorsports	DNS	DNS			**17**	10	**15**	18	**12**	20	**15**	**15**	173
3	(China) Yue Lin	(China) FFF Racing Team by ACM			15	18	20	15	20	23	15	16	16	14	163
4	(Japan) Takuya Shirasaka (Japan) Naoto Takeda	(Hong Kong) KCMG	18	15	**14**	**Ret**	19	**19**	30	**Ret**	16	19			131
5	(China) Junhan Zhu	(China) FFF Racing Team by ACM			15	18	20	15	20	23	15	16			130
6	(Singapore) Gregory Teo (Indonesia) David Tjiptobiantoro	(Singapore) T2 Motorsports	19	**14**			18	13	19	22	17	**Ret**			122
7	(Hong Kong) Samson Chan	(Switzerland) X-One Motorsports					**17**	10							50
8	(Hong Kong) Philip Ma (Hong Kong) Jacky Yeung	(Malaysia) Arrows Racing					21	17	22	25					44
9	(China) Ting Zheng	(China) FFF Racing Team by ACM											16	14	33
	(Chinese Taipei) Jun San Chen (China) Yu Lin	(Chinese Taipei) FIST - Team AAI	**Ret**	DNS											
	(Hong Kong) Vincent Wong	(Switzerland) X-One Motorsports	DNS	DNS											
Pos.	Driver	Team	SEP (Malaysia)		CHA (Thailand)		SUZ (Japan)		FUJ (Japan)		SHA (China)		ZHE (China)		Points

=== Teams' championship ===
Pos.	Team	Manufacturer	No.	SEP (Malaysia)		CHA (Thailand)		SUZ (Japan)		FUJ (Japan)		SHA (China)		ZHE (China)		Points
GT3
1	(Hong Kong) GruppeM Racing Team	Mercedes-Benz	888	4	5	DNS	8	14	6	5	6	7	6	5	9	243
1	(Hong Kong) GruppeM Racing Team	Mercedes-Benz	999	2	4	6	1	**7**	1	3	1	24	Ret	3	4	243
2	(Malaysia) OD Racing Team	Audi	86	**1**	2	Ret	3	3	Ret	11	8	2	3	1	**1**	160
3	Audi Hong Kong	Audi	5	5	3	2	2	1	14	17	3	1	5	4	6	158
4	(Hong Kong) Craft-Bamboo Racing	Porsche	88	7	7	10	13	2	8	**2**	11	Ret	9	9	2	139
4	(Hong Kong) Craft-Bamboo Racing	Porsche	99	17	11	11	9	**4**	4	10	12	6	1	12	DNS	139
5	(China) Spirit of Race	Ferrari	38	12	18	1	Ret	5	7	Ret	2					102
5	(China) Spirit of Race	Ferrari	39	6	10	8	4	9	Ret	Ret	**5**	8	17	Ret	DNS	102
6	(Italy) Vincenzo Sospiri Racing	Lamborghini	66	8	16	Ret	DNS	8	2	4	24	**4**	8	**10**	5	67
7	(China) FFF Racing Team by ACM	Lamborghini	1	16	6	12	6	12	5	9	14	11	7	2	7	62
7	(China) FFF Racing Team by ACM	Lamborghini	2	15	27	15	18	20	15	20	23	15	16	16	14	62
8	(Hong Kong) Audi R8 LMS Cup	Audi	6	10	**9**	3	Ret	10	9	Ret	9	3	2	11	8	60
9	(Hong Kong) J-Fly by Absolute Racing	Audi	7			4	**5**	13	**3**	12	Ret	25	**11**	7	10	46
10	(China) BBT	Ferrari	37	13	1	**Ret**	Ret									33
10	(China) BBT	Audi	37							6	13					33
11	(Hong Kong) KCMG by Champion Racing	Audi	18			5	Ret	16	Ret	Ret	16	DNS	DNS	8	3	29
12	(Japan) CarGuy Racing	Lamborghini	777					15	12	1	15					25
13	(Japan) ARN Racing	Ferrari	28					6	Ret	21	4					20
14	(Chinese Taipei) FIST - Team AAI	BMW	90	Ret	DNS					13	19					15
14	(Chinese Taipei) FIST - Team AAI	BMW	91	3	26					14	Ret	18^{1}	18^{1}			15
14	(Hong Kong) Milestone Racing	Audi	13	9	12	DNS	12	Ret	16	16	17	10	13	6	12	15
15	Singha Motorsport Team Thailand	Ferrari	9			7	7									12
16	(Japan) D'station Racing	Porsche	47					27	18	8	7					10
17	(Japan) Porsche Team EBI	Porsche	3							7	10					7
18	(Belgium) Team WRT	Audi	7	11	8											4
19	est cola Thailand	Porsche	8			9	10									3
20	(Switzerland) X-One Motorsports	Lamborghini	27	DNS	DNS			17	10	15	18	12	20	15	15	1
	(Thailand) Singha Plan-B Motorsport Team	Audi	59			13	11	11	11							0
	(Malaysia) CMRT Eurasia	Aston Martin	69	20	19	16	14			29	21	14	21	14	11	0
	(Hong Kong) KCMG	Audi	18	DNS	13											0
	(Hong Kong) KCMG	Audi	19	18	15	14	Ret	19	19	30	Ret	16	19			0
	(Singapore) T2 Motorsports	Ferrari	75	19	14			18	13	19	22	17	Ret			0
	(Malaysia) Arrows Racing	Porsche	98	14	17			21	17	22	25	19^{1}	4^{1}			0
	(Japan) SACCESS Racing	Lamborghini	390							18	20					0
	(Singapore) Clearwater Racing	McLaren	12	Ret	DNS											
Guest teams ineligible to score points
	(Hong Kong) Bentley Team Absolute	Bentley	20									5	12			
	(Hong Kong) Bentley Team Absolute	Bentley	30									Ret	15			
	(Chinese Taipei) HubAuto Racing	Porsche	33									13	14			
	(Chinese Taipei) HubAuto Racing	Porsche	277									9	10			
	(Hong Kong) Phoenix Racing Asia	Audi	16											13	13	
GT4
1	(Hong Kong) Craft-Bamboo Racing	Porsche	77	22	**22**	**EX**	15	22	**24**	24	28	20	**25**	**17**	**17**	216
2	(Malaysia) EKS Motorsports	Porsche	10	**23**	21	18	**16**	25	21	26	29	21	26	21	18	186
3	(Chinese Taipei) Taiwan Top Speed Racing Team	Porsche	17	25	25	17	17	**23**	20	27	30	26	22	19	20	185
4	(Chinese Taipei) HubAuto Racing	Porsche	89	24	23	Ret	19	24	23	25	27	**22**	24	18	16	175
5	(Hong Kong) TTR Team SARD	Porsche	11	26	24	Ret	DNS	26	22	28	Ret	23	23	20	19	109
6	(Singapore) Clearwater Racing	McLaren	12							**23**	**26**					50
Pos.	Team	Manufacturer	No.	SEP (Malaysia)		CHA (Thailand)		SUZ (Japan)		FUJ (Japan)		SHA (China)		ZHE (China)		Points

Notes

- ^{1} – Arrows Racing and FIST - Team AAI were guest teams in Shanghai and therefore ineligible to score points.

== See also ==
- 2017 Blancpain GT Series
- 2017 Blancpain GT Series Endurance Cup
- 2017 Blancpain GT Series Sprint Cup
