= Martin Kodrić =

Croatian racing driver

- Nationality: Croatian
- Born: 8 June 1997 (age 29) Zagreb, Croatia

International GT Open
- Categorisation: FIA Silver (until 2020); FIA Gold (2021–)
- Years active: 2019 International GT Open
- Teams: Teo Martín Motorsport
- Starts: 14
- Wins: 1
- Poles: 0
- Best finish: 1st in 2019

Previous series
- 2014 2014–15 2016 2017–18 2017–18: Toyota Racing Series; Formula Renault 2.0; Lamborghini Super Trofeo Europe; Blancpain GT Series Asia; Blancpain GT Series Endurance Cup

Championship titles
- 2018: Blancpain GT Series Asia

Martin Kodrić (born 8 June 1997 in Zagreb) is a racing driver from Croatia. He last competed in the International GT Open for Teo Martín Motorsport, and the GT World Challenge Europe Endurance Cup.

== Racing record ==
=== Career summary ===
| Season | Series | Team | Races | Wins | Poles | FLaps | Podiums | Points | Position |
|---|---|---|---|---|---|---|---|---|---|
| 2014 | Toyota Racing Series | ETEC Motorsport | 15 | 0 | 0 | 0 | 0 | 211 | 22nd |
| 2014 | Formula Renault 2.0 NEC | Fortec Motorsports | 13 | 0 | 0 | 0 | 0 | 80 | 18th |
| 2014 | Formula Renault 2.0 Alps | Fortec Motorsports | 14 | 0 | 0 | 0 | 0 | 18 | 19th |
| 2015 | Formula Renault 2.0 Eurocup | Fortec Motorsports | 17 | 0 | 1 | 0 | 1 | 47 | 11th |
| 2015 | Formula Renault 2.0 Alps | Fortec Motorsports | 6 | 0 | 1 | 1 | 0 | 0 | NC† |
| 2016 | Lamborghini Super Trofeo Europe - Pro | Bonaldi Motorsport | 12 | 1 | 0 | 0 | 5 | 106 | 4th |
| 2016 | Lamborghini Super Trofeo World Final - Pro | Bonaldi Motorsport | 2 | 0 | 0 | 0 | 0 | 6 | 9th |
| 2017 | Blancpain GT Series Sprint Cup | Strakka Motorsport | 4 | 0 | 0 | 0 | 0 | 0 | NC |
| 2017 | Blancpain GT Series Endurance Cup | Barwell Motorsport | 5 | 0 | 0 | 0 | 0 | 0 | NC |
| 2017 | Intercontinental GT Challenge | Barwell Motorsport | 1 | 0 | 0 | 0 | 0 | 0 | NC |
| 2017 | Blancpain GT Series Asia - GT3 | Vincenzo Sospiri Racing | 5 | 0 | 0 | 0 | 0 | 16 | 24th |
| 2017 | 24H Series - A6 | Car Collection Motorsport | | | | | | | |
| 2018 | Blancpain GT Series Endurance Cup | Barwell Motorsport | 5 | 0 | 0 | 0 | 0 | 0 | NC |
| 2018 | Blancpain GT Series Asia - GT3 | FFF Racing Team by ACM | 12 | 3 | 3 | 1 | 6 | 170 | **1st** |
| 2019 | International GT Open | Teo Martín Motorsport | 14 | 1 | 0 | 1 | 6 | 116 | **3rd** |
| 2020 | Australian Endurance Championship | Team 59Racing | 1 | 1 | 1 | ? | 1 | 0 | NC† |
| 2020 | British GT Championship - GT3 | 2 Seas Motorsport | 1 | 0 | 0 | 0 | 0 | 0 | NC† |
| 2020 | GT World Challenge Europe Endurance Cup | Ema Group/Team 59Racing | 1 | 0 | 0 | 0 | 0 | 0 | NC |
| 2021 | British GT Championship - GT3 | 2 Seas Motorsport | 1 | 1 | 1 | 0 | 1 | 0 | NC† |
| 2021 | International GT Open | 2 Seas Motorsport | 4 | 2 | 0 | 0 | 2 | 38 | 6th |
| 2022 | Italian GT Championship - GT Cup | Bonaldi Motorsport | | | | | | | |
| 2023 | International GT Open | Bonaldi Motorsport | 5 | 0 | 1 | 0 | 0 | 12 | 19th |
| 2024 | GT World Challenge Europe Endurance Cup | 2 Seas Motorsport | 2 | 0 | 0 | 0 | 0 | 0 | NC |

^{*} Season still in progress.

† Guest driver ineligible to score points

=== Complete Formula Renault 2.0 NEC results ===
(key) (Races in bold indicate pole position) (Races in italics indicate fastest lap)

| Year | Entrant | 1 | 2 | 3 | 4 | 5 | 6 | 7 | 8 | 9 | 10 | 11 | 12 | 13 | 14 | 15 | 16 | 17 | DC | Points |
|---|---|---|---|---|---|---|---|---|---|---|---|---|---|---|---|---|---|---|---|---|
| 2014 | Fortec Motorsports | MNZ; 1; 12 | MNZ; 2; 28 | SIL; 1 WD | SIL; 2 WD | HOC; 1; 11 | HOC; 2; 12 | HOC; 3 Ret | SPA; 1; 18 | SPA; 2; 13 | ASS; 1; 18 | ASS; 2; 9 | MST; 1; 16 | MST; 2; 12 | MST; 3 C | NÜR; 1; 14 | NÜR; 2; 16 | NÜR; 3 C | 18th | 80 |

=== Complete Formula Renault 2.0 Alps Series results ===
(key) (Races in bold indicate pole position; races in italics indicate fastest lap)

| Year | Team | 1 | 2 | 3 | 4 | 5 | 6 | 7 | 8 | 9 | 10 | 11 | 12 | 13 | 14 | 15 | 16 | Pos | Points |
|---|---|---|---|---|---|---|---|---|---|---|---|---|---|---|---|---|---|---|---|
| 2014 | Fortec Motorsports | IMO; 1; 27 | IMO; 2; 16 | PAU; 1; 12 | PAU; 2; 5 | RBR; 1 Ret | RBR; 2; 10 | SPA; 1; 24 | SPA; 2; 17 | MNZ; 1; 7 | MNZ; 2; 20 | MUG; 1; 18 | MUG; 2 Ret | JER; 1; 20 | JER; 2; 25 | | | 19th | 18 |
| 2015 | Fortec Motorsports | IMO; 1; 6 | IMO; 2; 4 | PAU; 1; 4 | PAU; 2; 13 | RBR; 1 | RBR; 2 | RBR; 3 | SPA; 1 | SPA; 2 | MNZ; 1 | MNZ; 2 | MNZ; 3 | MIS; 1 | MIS; 2 | JER; 1; 7 | **JER**; **2**; 4 | NC† | 0 |

† As Kodrić was a guest driver, he was ineligible for points

=== Complete Eurocup Formula Renault 2.0 results ===
(key) (Races in bold indicate pole position; races in italics indicate fastest lap)

| Year | Entrant | 1 | 2 | 3 | 4 | 5 | 6 | 7 | 8 | 9 | 10 | 11 | 12 | 13 | 14 | 15 | 16 | 17 | DC | Points |
|---|---|---|---|---|---|---|---|---|---|---|---|---|---|---|---|---|---|---|---|---|
| 2015 | Fortec Motorsports | ALC; 1; 13 | ALC; 2; 18 | ALC; 3 Ret | SPA; 1; 19 | SPA; 2; 13 | HUN; 1; 5 | HUN; 2; 11 | SIL; 1; 7 | SIL; 2; 11 | SIL; 3; 12 | NÜR; 1; 9 | NÜR; 2; 2 | LMS; 1; 10 | LMS; 2; 13 | JER; 1; 8 | JER; 2; 9 | JER; 3; 9 | 11th | 47 |

=== Complete Bathurst 12 Hour results ===
| Year | Car# | Team | Co-Drivers | Car | Class | Laps | Pos. | Class Pos. |
|---|---|---|---|---|---|---|---|---|
| 2020 | 37 | (Australia) Team 59Racing | (Australia) Fraser Ross (New Zealand) Dominic Storey | McLaren 720S GT3 | Silver | 313 | 7th | **1st** |

=== Complete Blancpain GT Series Sprint Cup results ===
| Year | Team | Car | Class | 1 | 2 | 3 | 4 | 5 | 6 | 7 | 8 | 9 | 10 | Pos. | Points |
|---|---|---|---|---|---|---|---|---|---|---|---|---|---|---|---|
| 2017 | Strakka Racing | McLaren 650S GT3 | Silver | MIS; QR | MIS; CR | BRH; QR | BRH; CR | ZOL; QR | ZOL; CR | HUN; QR; 25 | HUN; CR; Ret | NÜR; QR; 17 | NÜR; CR; 13 | 8th | 27 |
