= 2020 Australian GT Championship =

Australian motor racing

The 2020 Australian GT Championship was scheduled to be the 24th running of the Australian GT Championship, a Motorsport Australia-sanctioned Australian motor racing championship open to FIA GT3 cars, FIA GT4 cars and similar cars as approved for the championship. The effects of the COVID-19 pandemic resulted in only the first round of the Australian Endurance Championship, and the first & second rounds of the Australian GT Trophy Series taking place before the rest of the season was abandoned.

== Race calendar ==
The 2020 calendar was unveiled on 31 October 2019.
A revised calendar was announced on 26 June 2020 as a result of the COVID-19 pandemic.
Ultimately, the COVID-19 pandemic resulted in all further rounds being cancelled.

End	TS	Circuit	Location	Date	Supporting
1		(New South Wales) Mount Panorama Circuit	Bathurst, New South Wales	30 January – 2 February	Intercontinental GT Challenge (Note: Part Of The Bathurst 12 Hours.)
	1	(Victoria (state)) Sandown Raceway	Melbourne, Victoria	15–16 February	Victorian State Series
	2	(New South Wales) Sydney Motorsport Park	Eastern Creek, New South Wales	7–8 March	NSW State Series

Event is part of Australian Endurance Championship
Event is part of Australian GT Trophy Series

== Entry list ==
=== Australian Endurance Championship ===
Team	Car	No.	Drivers	Class	Rounds
(Australia) Wall Racing	Lamborghini Huracán GT3 Evo	6	(Australia) Adrian Deitz	S	1
(Australia) Wall Racing	Lamborghini Huracán GT3 Evo	6	(Australia) Tony D'Alberto	S	1
(Australia) Wall Racing	Lamborghini Huracán GT3 Evo	6	(Australia) Cameron McConville	S	1
(Australia) Wall Racing	Lamborghini Huracán GT3 Evo	6	(United Kingdom) Jules Westwood	S	1
(Australia) Hallmarc Racing	Audi R8 LMS Evo	9	(Australia) Marc Cini	PA	1
(Australia) Hallmarc Racing	Audi R8 LMS Evo	9	(Australia) Dean Fiore	PA	1
(Australia) Hallmarc Racing	Audi R8 LMS Evo	9	(Australia) Lee Holdsworth	PA	1
(Australia) Nineteen Corp. With Multimatic Motorsports	Mercedes-AMG GT4	19	(Australia) Mark Griffith	GT4	1
(Australia) Nineteen Corp. With Multimatic Motorsports	Mercedes-AMG GT4	19	(Germany) Dirk Müller	GT4	1
(Australia) Nineteen Corp. With Multimatic Motorsports	Mercedes-AMG GT4	19	(United Kingdom) Harrison Newey	GT4	1
(Australia) T2 Racing	MARC II Mustang	20	(Australia) Adam Hargraves	I	1
(Australia) T2 Racing	MARC II Mustang	20	(Australia) Daniel Jilesen	I	1
(Australia) T2 Racing	MARC II Mustang	20	(Monaco) Cédric Sbirrazzuoli	I	1
(Australia) T2 Racing	MARC II Mustang	20	(Australia) Steve Owen	I	1
(Australia) Tony Bates Racing	Audi R8 LMS Evo	24	(Australia) Tony Bates	S	1
(Australia) Tony Bates Racing	Audi R8 LMS Evo	24	(Australia) Geoff Emery	S	1
(Australia) Tony Bates Racing	Audi R8 LMS Evo	24	(Australia) Dylan O'Keeffe	S	1
(Australia) Tony Bates Racing	Audi R8 LMS Evo	24	(Australia) Max Twigg	S	1
(Australia) Trofeo Motorsport	Lamborghini Huracán GT3	29	(Australia) Dean Canto	PA	1
(Australia) Trofeo Motorsport	Lamborghini Huracán GT3	29	(Australia) Grant Denyer	PA	1
(Australia) Trofeo Motorsport	Lamborghini Huracán GT3	29	(Australia) Liam Talbot	PA	1
(Australia) Trofeo Motorsport	Lamborghini Huracán GT3	29	(Australia) Marcel Zalloua	PA	1
(Australia) Team 59Racing	McLaren 720S GT3	59	(Croatia) Martin Kodrić	S	1
(Australia) Team 59Racing	McLaren 720S GT3	59	(Australia) Fraser Ross	S	1
(Australia) Team 59Racing	McLaren 720S GT3	59	(New Zealand) Dominic Storey	S	1
(Australia) SCANDIA Racing - by Racer Industries	MARC II Mustang	91	(Australia) Aaron Cameron	I	1
(Australia) SCANDIA Racing - by Racer Industries	MARC II Mustang	91	(Australia) Broc Feeney	I	1
(Australia) SCANDIA Racing - by Racer Industries	MARC II Mustang	91	(Australia) Nick Percat	I	1
(Australia) SCANDIA Racing - by Racer Industries	MARC II Mustang	92	(Australia) Tyler Everingham	I	1
(Australia) SCANDIA Racing - by Racer Industries	MARC II Mustang	92	(Australia) James Kaye	I	1
(Australia) SCANDIA Racing - by Racer Industries	MARC II Mustang	92	(Australia) Hadrian Morrall	I	1
(Australia) GJ Motorsport	MARC II Mustang	95	(Australia) Bayley Hall	I	1
(Australia) GJ Motorsport	MARC II Mustang	95	(Australia) Warren Luff	I	1
(Australia) GJ Motorsport	MARC II Mustang	95	(Australia) Brad Schumacher	I	1
(Australia) GJ Motorsport	MARC II Mustang	95	(Australia) Geoff Taunton	I	1
(Australia) Hobson/Garth Walden Racing	Nissan GT-R Nismo GT3 (2017)	96	(Australia) Brett Hobson	S	1
(Australia) Hobson/Garth Walden Racing	Nissan GT-R Nismo GT3 (2017)	96	(Australia) Garth Walden	S	1
(Australia) Hobson/Garth Walden Racing	Nissan GT-R Nismo GT3 (2017)	96	(Australia) Kurt Kostecki	S	1
(Australia) Triple Eight Race Engineering	Mercedes-AMG GT3	777	(Australia) Anton de Pasquale	PA	1
(Australia) Triple Eight Race Engineering	Mercedes-AMG GT3	777	(Australia) Nick Foster	PA	1
(Australia) Triple Eight Race Engineering	Mercedes-AMG GT3	777	(Australia) Sam Shahin	PA	1
(Australia) Triple Eight Race Engineering	Mercedes-AMG GT3	777	(Australia) Yasser Shahin	PA	1

Icon	Class
S	Silver Cup
PA	Pro-Am Cup
GT4	GT4 Class
I	Invitational Class

=== Australian GT Trophy Series ===
Team	Car	No.	Drivers	Class	Rounds
Trophy Series
(Australia) KFC Racing	Audi R8 LMS Ultra	23	(Australia) Matt Stoupas	Am	1–2
(Australia) KFC Racing	Audi R8 LMS	24	(Australia) Gary Higgon	Am	1–2
(Australia) KFC Racing	Audi R8 LMS	24	(Australia) Nathan Antunes	Am	2
(Australia) REN Racing	Audi R8 LMS	33	(Australia) Vince Muriti	Am	2
(Australia) REN Racing	Audi R8 LMS	99	(Australia) Nick Kelly	Am	2
(Australia) Mack Bros Racing	Ferrari 458 Italia GT3	47	(Australia) Wayne Mack	Am	1
(Australia) Wall Racing	Lamborghini Gallardo R-EX	69	(Australia) Richard Gartner	Am	2
(Australia) DPM Motorsports	Chevrolet Camaro SS GT3	71	(Australia) Dale Paterson	Am	1
(Australia) Showergrate Shop	Lamborghini Gallardo R-EX	73	(Australia) Peter Corbett	Am	2
Trofeo Challenge
(Australia) Trofeo Motorsport	Lamborghini Huracán Super Trofeo Evo	19	(Australia) Arthur Abrahams	Am	1–2
(Australia) Trofeo Motorsport	Lamborghini Huracán Super Trofeo Evo	29	(Australia) Tayla Heath	Am	1
(Australia) Stillwell Family Racing	Ford S197 Mustang	60	(Australia) Michael Stillwell	Am	1–2
(Australia) Stillwell Family Racing	Ford S197 Mustang	60	(Australia) Dave Stillwell	Am	2
(Australia) GJ Motorsport	MARC II Mustang	95	(Australia) Geoff Taunton	Am	2

Icon	Class
PA	Pro-Am Class
Am	Am Class

== Race results ==
Bold indicates overall winner.

=== Australian Endurance Championship ===
Round	Circuit	Pole position	Silver winners	Pro-am winners	GT4 winners	Invitational winners
1	(New South Wales) Bathurst	(Australia) No. 59 Team 59Racing	**(Australia) No. 59 Team 59Racing**	(Australia) No. 9 Hallmarc Racing	(Australia) No. 19 Nineteen Corp. with Multimatic Motorsports	(Australia) No. 91 SCANDIA Racing - by Racer Industries
1	(New South Wales) Bathurst	(Croatia) Martin Kodrić (Australia) Fraser Ross (New Zealand) Dominic Storey	**(Croatia) Martin Kodrić** **(Australia) Fraser Ross** **(New Zealand) Dominic Storey**	(Australia) Marc Cini (Australia) Dean Fiore (Australia) Lee Holdsworth	(Australia) Mark Griffith (Germany) Dirk Müller (United Kingdom) Harrison Newey	(Australia) Aaron Cameron (Australia) Broc Feeney (Australia) Nick Percat

=== Australian GT Trophy Series ===
Round		Circuit	Pole position	TS Am Winners	TC Am Winners
1	R1	(Victoria (state)) Sandown	(Australia) No. 23 KFC Racing	**(Australia) No. 23 KFC Racing**	(Australia) No. 29 Trofeo Motorsport
1	R1	(Victoria (state)) Sandown	(Australia) Matt Stoupas	**(Australia) Matt Stoupas**	(Australia) Tayla Heath
1	R2	(Victoria (state)) Sandown		**(Australia) No. 23 KFC Racing**	(Australia) No. 19 Trofeo Motorsport
1	R2	(Victoria (state)) Sandown		**(Australia) Matt Stoupas**	(Australia) Arthur Abrahams
2	R1	(New South Wales) Sydney	(Australia) No. 23 KFC Racing	**(Australia) No. 23 KFC Racing**	(Australia) No. 95 GJ Motorsport
2	R1	(New South Wales) Sydney	(Australia) Matt Stoupas	**(Australia) Matt Stoupas**	(Australia) Geoff Taunton
2	R2	(New South Wales) Sydney		**(Australia) No. 24 KFC Racing**	(Australia) No. 95 GJ Motorsport
2	R2	(New South Wales) Sydney		**(Australia) Nathan Antunes** **(Australia) Gary Higgon**	(Australia) Geoff Taunton

== Championship standings ==
Points system

Position	**1st**	**2nd**	**3rd**	**4th**	**5th**	**6th**	**7th**	**8th**	**9th**	**10th**	**11th**	**12th**	**13th**	**14th**	**15th**	**16th**	**17th**	**18th**	**19th**	**20th**	**21st**	**22nd**	**23rd**	**24th+**
Qualifying	10	8	7	6	5	4	3	2	1	—N/a														
TS	50	44	39	33	31	30	27	25	24	23	22	20	19	18	17	15	14	13	12	10	8	5	2	2
AEC	450	398	345	293	285	270	248	225	215	203	192	180	170	158	147	135	125	113	102	90	68	45	23	8

=== Australian Endurance Championship ===
Pos.	Drivers	BAT (New South Wales)		Points
Pos.	Drivers	QP	R	Points
Pro-Am Cup
1	(Australia) Marc Cini (Australia) Dean Fiore (Australia) Lee Holdsworth	10	**1**	460
2	(Australia) Nick Foster (Australia) Anton de Pasquale (Australia) Sam Shahin (Australia) Yasser Shahin	8	DNS	8
Silver Cup
1	(Australia) Fraser Ross (New Zealand) Dominic Storey	10	**1**	460
2	(Australia) Dean Canto (Australia) Grant Denyer (Australia) Liam Talbot	8	2	406
3	(Australia) Brett Hobson (Australia) Garth Walden (Australia) Kurt Kostecki	5	3	350
4	(Australia) Adrian Deitz (Australia) Tony D'Alberto (Australia) Cameron McConville	7	Ret	7
5	(Australia) Tony Bates (Australia) Geoff Emery (Australia) Dylan O'Keeffe (Australia) Max Twigg	6	Ret	6
**Ineligible to score points in Silver Cup**
	(Croatia) Martin Kodrić		**1**	–
	(Australia) Marcel Zalloua		2	–
	(United Kingdom) Jules Westwood		Ret	–
GT4 Cup
1	(Australia) Mark Griffith	10	**1**	460
**Ineligible to score points in GT4 Cup**
	(Germany) Dirk Müller (United Kingdom) Harrison Newey		**1**	–
Invitational Cup
1	(Australia) Aaron Cameron (Australia) Broc Feeney	10	**1**	460
2	(Australia) Bayley Hall (Australia) Warren Luff (Australia) Brad Schumacher (Australia) Geoff Taunton	8	NC	8
3	(Australia) Adam Hargraves (Australia) Daniel Jilesen (Monaco) Cédric Sbirrazzuoli	7	NC	7
4	(Australia) Tyler Everingham (Australia) Hadrian Morrall	6	DNS	6
**Ineligible to score points in Invitational Cup**
	(Australia) Nick Percat		**1**	–
	(Australia) Steve Owen		NC	–
	(Australia) James Kaye		DNS	–
Pos.	Drivers	BAT (New South Wales)		Points

Colour	Result
Gold	Winner
Silver	Second place
Bronze	Third place
Green	Points classification
Blue	Non-points classification
Blue	Non-classified finish (NC)
Purple	Retired, not classified (Ret)
Red	Did not qualify (DNQ)
Red	Did not pre-qualify (DNPQ)
Black	Disqualified (DSQ)
White	Did not start (DNS)
White	Withdrew (WD)
White	Race cancelled (C)
Blank	Did not practice (DNP)
Blank	Did not arrive (DNA)
Blank	Excluded (EX)

Bold - Pole position in class

=== Australian GT Trophy Series ===
Pos.	Drivers	SAN (Victoria (state))			SMP (New South Wales)			Points
Pos.	Drivers	QP	R1	R2	QP	R1	R2	Points
1	(Australia) Matt Stoupas	10	**1**	1	8	1	4	201
2	(Australia) Gary Higgon	7	3	2	10	3	1	189
3	(Australia) Nathan Antunes				10	3	1	99
4	(Australia) Wayne Mack	8	2	3				91
5	(Australia) Vince Muriti				6	4	2	83
6	(Australia) Nick Kelly				7	2	5	82
7	(Australia) Richard Gartner				5	Ret	3	44
8	(Australia) Dale Paterson	6	DNS	Ret				6
9	(Australia) Peter Corbett				0	DNS	DNS	0
Pos.	Drivers	SAN (Victoria (state))			SMP (New South Wales)			Points

=== Trofeo Challenge ===
Pos.	Drivers	SAN (Victoria (state))			SMP (New South Wales)			Points
Pos.	Drivers	QP	R1	R2	QP	R1	R2	Points
1	(Australia) Arthur Abrahams	8	2	1	8	2	2	198
2	(Australia) Michael Stillwell	7	3	3	7	3	3	170
3	(Australia) Geoff Taunton				10	1	1	110
4	(Australia) Tayla Heath	10	**1**	2				104
5	(Australia) Dave Stillwell				7	3	3	85
Pos.	Drivers	SAN (Victoria (state))			SMP (New South Wales)			Points
