= GT World Challenge Asia =

GT World Challenge: Asia, Current

- Category: Grand tourer sportscars
- Country: International
- Inaugural season: 2017
- Drivers' champion: (China) Lu Wei
- Teams' champion: (Hong Kong) Absolute Racing
- Official website: www.gt-world-challenge-asia.com

The GT World Challenge Asia (formerly Blancpain GT Series Asia and Blancpain GT World Challenge Asia) is a GT series motor racing competition promoted by the Stéphane Ratel Organisation and organized by Team Asia One GT Management.

From its inception in 2017 to 2023, GT World Challenge Asia was a multi-class championship featuring GT3 and GT4 cars. In 2024, the series adopted the same GT3-only format as the other GT World Challenge series on other continents.

The Japan Cup series debuted in 2022 as a parallel championship within GT World Challenge Asia, with races held exclusively in Japan. It was split into a separate championship in 2024.

Each season consists of six rounds, each with two 60-minute races. Each entry has two drivers, which must swap in a compulsory pitstop between the 25th and 35th minute.

== Circuits ==
- **Bold** denotes an active circuit is used in the 2026 season.
- **Italic** denotes a future circuit will be used in the 2027 season.

Number	Circuits	Rounds	Years
1	(Malaysia) **Sepang International Circuit**	8	2017–2019, 2022–present
1	(Japan) **Fuji Speedway**	8	2017–2019, 2022–present
3	(Thailand) **Chang International Circuit**	6	2017–2019, 2023–2025, 2027
3	(Japan) **Suzuka Circuit**	6	2017–2019, 2022–2024, 2027
5	(China) **Shanghai International Circuit**	5	2017–2019, 2024, 2026
5	(Japan) **Okayama International Circuit**	5	2022–2026
7	(Indonesia) **Mandalika International Street Circuit**	2	2025–2026
7	(China) **Beijing Street Circuit**	2	2025–present
9	(China) Zhejiang International Circuit	1	2017
9	(China) Ningbo International Circuit	1	2018
9	(South Korea) Korea International Circuit	1	2019
9	(Japan) Sportsland Sugo	1	2022
9	(Japan) Mobility Resort Motegi	1	2023

== Champions ==
=== Drivers ===
Year	GT3 Overall	GT3 Silver	GT3 Pro-Am	GT3 Silver-Am	GT3 Am-Am (2017) GT3 Am (2018–)	GT4 Overall	China Cup
2017	(United Kingdom) Hunter Abbott	(Hong Kong) Marchy Lee (Hong Kong) Shaun Thong	(United Kingdom) Hunter Abbott	—N/a	(China) James Cai (Malaysia) Kenneth Lim	(France) Jean-Marc Merlin (Hong Kong) Frank Yu	—N/a
2018	(Croatia) Martin Kodrić (Denmark) Dennis Lind	(Croatia) Martin Kodrić (Denmark) Dennis Lind	(Japan) Hiroshi Hamaguchi (Switzerland) Marco Mapelli	—N/a	(Japan) Takuya Shirasaka (Japan) Naoto Takeda	(Germany) Reinhold Renger	—N/a
2019	(South Korea) Roelof Bruins	(South Korea) Roelof Bruins	(Thailand) Vutthikorn Inthraphuvasak	—N/a	(Australia) Andrew Macpherson (Australia) William Ben Porter	(Japan) Sunako Jukuchou	—N/a
2022	(Japan) Kei Cozzolino (Japan) Takeshi Kimura	(Japan) Naoki Yokomizo	(Australia) Nick Foster (Malaysia) Prince Jeffri Ibrahim	—N/a	(Australia) Andrew Macpherson (Australia) William Ben Porter	(Chinese Taipei) Brian Lee (Japan) Hideto Yasuoka	—N/a
2023	(China) Anthony Liu Xu	(China) Kang Ling (China) Cao Qi	(China) Anthony Liu Xu	—N/a	(China) Bian Ye (China) Hu Yuqi	(Japan) Masaki Kano (Japan) Manabu Orido	(China) Franky Cheng Congfu (China) Sun Jingzu
2024	(China) Leo Ye Hongli (China) Yuan Bo	(China) Franky Cheng Congfu (Hong Kong) Adderly Fong	(Belgium) Alessio Picariello (China) Anthony Liu Xu	(China) Leo Ye Hongli (China) Yuan Bo	(Indonesia) David Tjiptobiantoro	—N/a	(China) Franky Cheng Congfu (Hong Kong) Adderly Fong
2025	(China) Leo Ye Hongli (China) Yuan Bo	(China) Franky Cheng Congfu (China) James Yu Kuai	(China) Lu Wei	(Netherlands) Maxime Oosten (China) Ruan Cunfan	(Indonesia) David Tjiptobiantoro (Italy) Christian Colombo	—N/a	(China) Leo Ye Hongli (China) Yuan Bo
2026	(China) Lu Wei	(China) Franky Cheng Congfu (China) James Yu Kuai	(China) Lu Wei	(Chinese Taipei) Brian Lee (Netherlands) Maxime Oosten	(Indonesia) Setiawan Santoso (China) Zhou Bihuang	—N/a	(China) Franky Cheng Congfu (China) James Yu Kuai

=== Teams ===
Year	GT3	GT4
2017	(Hong Kong) GruppeM Racing Team	(Hong Kong) Craft-Bamboo Racing
2018	(China) FFF Racing Team by ACM	(Japan) BMW Team Studie
2019	(China) Absolute Racing	(Chinese Taipei) Team iRace.Win
2022	(Australia) Triple Eight JMR	(Japan) GTO Racing Team
2023	(China) R&B Racing	(Japan) YZ Racing with Studie
2024	(China) Origine Motorsport	—N/a
2025	(China) Origine Motorsport	—N/a
2026	(Hong Kong) Absolute Racing	—N/a

== See also ==
- British GT Championship
- GT Asia Series, a similar series from 2010-2016
- GT World Challenge Europe
- GT World Challenge Europe Endurance Cup
- GT World Challenge Europe Sprint Cup
- GT World Challenge America
- GT World Challenge Australia
