= George Chou =

Taiwanese racing driver

- Nationality: Taiwanese
- Born: 24 September 1975 (age 51) Kaohsiung, Taiwan

TCR Asia Series career
- Debut season: 2015
- Current team: Roadstar Racing
- Car number: 78
- Starts: 2
- Poles: 1
- Fastest laps: 1

Previous series
- 2014-15 2013 2012 2011, 14 2011 2010-11 2007-09: GT Asia Series; Porsche Carrera Cup Asia; Lamborghini Super Trofeo Asia; Ferrari Challenge Asia Pacific; Japan Touring Car Championship; Volkswagen Scirocco Cup China; China Formula Open Series

Championship titles
- 2011: Japan Touring Car Championship

"George" Chou Chin Nan (born 24 September 1975) is a Taiwanese racing driver currently competing in the TCR Asia Series. Having previously competed in the GT Asia Series, Porsche Carrera Cup Asia and Lamborghini Super Trofeo Asia amongst others.

== Racing career ==
Chou began his career in 2007 in the China Formula Open Series. In 2010, he switched to the Volkswagen Scirocco Cup China. He won the Japan Touring Car Championship in 2011. From 2011 to 2014, he raced in the Ferrari Challenge Asia Pacific, Lamborghini Super Trofeo Asia, Porsche Carrera Cup Asia and GT Asia Series.

In September 2015, it was announced that Chou would race in the TCR Asia Series and TCR International Series, driving a SEAT León Cup Racer for Roadstar Racing. Chou claimed his first TCR Asia pole position in Singapore.

== Racing record ==
=== Complete TCR International Series results ===
(key) (Races in bold indicate pole position) (Races in italics indicate fastest lap)

Year	Team	Car	1	2	3	4	5	6	7	8	9	10	11	12	13	14	15	16	17	18	19	20	21	22	DC	Points
2015	Roadstar Racing	SEAT León Cup Racer	MYS; 1	MYS; 2	CHN; 1	CHN; 2	ESP; 1	ESP; 2	POR; 1	POR; 2	ITA; 1	ITA; 2	AUT; 1	AUT; 2	RUS; 1	RUS; 2	RBR; 1	RBR; 2	SIN; 1; 18	SIN; 2; 13	THA; 1	THA; 2	MAC; 1	MAC; 2	NC	0
