= Masahiko Ida =

Japanese racing driver

- Nationality: Japanese
- Born: 25 July 1961 (age 65) Japan

TCR Asia Series career
- Debut season: 2015
- Current team: Roadstar Racing
- Car number: 78
- Starts: 3

Previous series
- 2013: Audi R8 LMS Cup

Masahiko Ida (born 25 July 1961) is a Japanese racing driver currently competing in the TCR Asia Series. He previously competed in the Audi R8 LMS Cup.

== Racing career ==
Ida began his career in 2013 in the Audi R8 LMS Cup. He has also raced in the Super GT championship. In September 2015, it was announced that he would race in the first ever TCR Asia Series round in Sepang, driving a SEAT León Cup Racer for Roadstar Racing.
