= Corey Lewis (racing driver) =

American racing driver (born 1991)

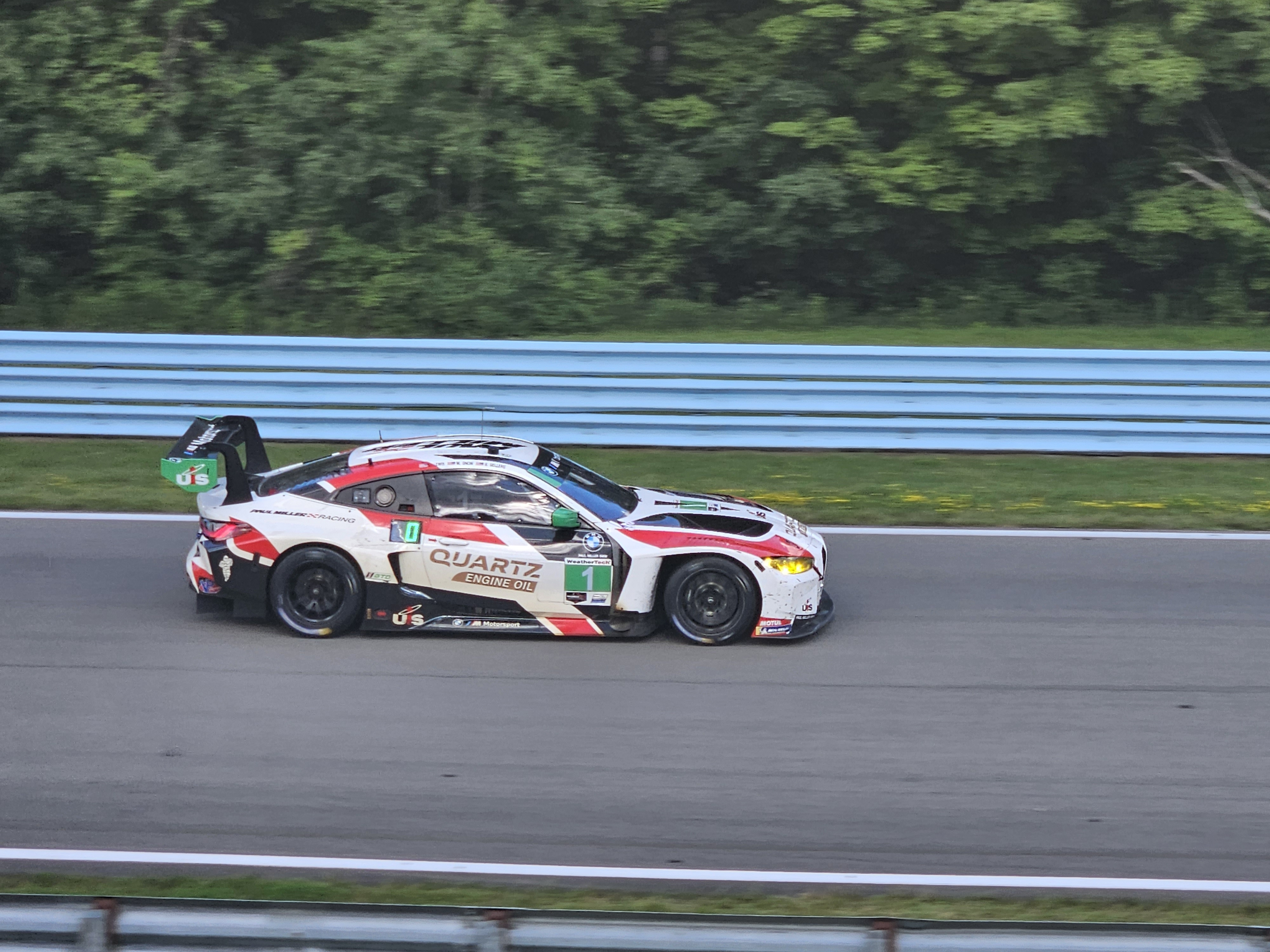
- Lewis' Paul Miller BMW in 2023.
- Nationality: (United States) American
- Born: October 17, 1991 (age 35) Nazareth, Pennsylvania, United States

GT World Challenge America career
- Debut season: 2018
- Current team: TR3 Racing
- Categorisation: FIA Bronze (until 2016); FIA Silver (2017–)
- Car number: 91
- Former teams: Zelus Motorsports; K-Pax Racing; GMG Racing
- Starts: 25
- Wins: 2
- Podiums: 11
- Poles: 0
- Fastest laps: 2

Previous series
- 2013–17, 20 2014, 16, 18–20: Michelin Pilot Challenge; Lamborghini Super Trofeo North America

Championship titles
- 2015 2018 2019 2020: Lamborghini Super Trofeo World Final – Pro-Am; Lamborghini Super Trofeo North America – Pro; Lamborghini Super Trofeo North America – Pro; Lamborghini Super Trofeo North America – Pro-Am

Corey Lewis (born October 17, 1991) is an American racing driver who currently competes for Paul Miller Racing in the IMSA SportsCar Championship.

== Career ==
=== Early career ===
Lewis began his racing career at the age of seven, competing in regional karting series under the tutelage of Michael Andretti. In 2002, he collected the Stars of Karting Regional Championship, and two years later was scored runner-up in the World Karting Association National Series. In 2007, Lewis began competing at the Skip Barber Racing School, winning 14 of the 26 races he entered over the course of three years at the school. Prior to the 2012 Star Mazda Championship season, Lewis completed a test with Team GDT at Barber Motorsports Park with plans to drive for the team that season. However, Lewis would compete in just one event for the team in 2012, finishing 12th and 21st at the Toronto double-header in July.

=== Sports car racing ===
In 2013, Lewis began competing in the Continental Tire Sports Car Challenge, marking his first foray into sports car and touring car racing. The following season, he scored his first win in the series, competing in the Street Tuner class for BERG Racing at Indianapolis. 2015 marked a double title success for Lewis, as he took the Pro-Am class title in both the Lamborghini Super Trofeo North America as well as the Lamborghini Super Trofeo World Final.

For 2016, Lewis extended his partnership with Change Racing, signing for the 2016 IMSA SportsCar Championship season alongside co-driver Spencer Pumpelly. The same season, Lewis joined the Lamborghini GT3 Junior Program, representing the team in IMSA competition alongside Richard Antinucci, Edoardo Piscopo, and Cedric Sbirrazzuoli. Change Racing registered a best finish of fifth, at VIR and Mosport, as the duo finished ninth in GTD-class points. That winter, Lewis traveled to Asia to compete with VS Racing in the GT class of the Asian Le Mans Series. A return to Change Racing in 2017 was highlighted by Lewis' first IMSA SportsCar Championship victory, as the team took GTD class honors at VIR in August.

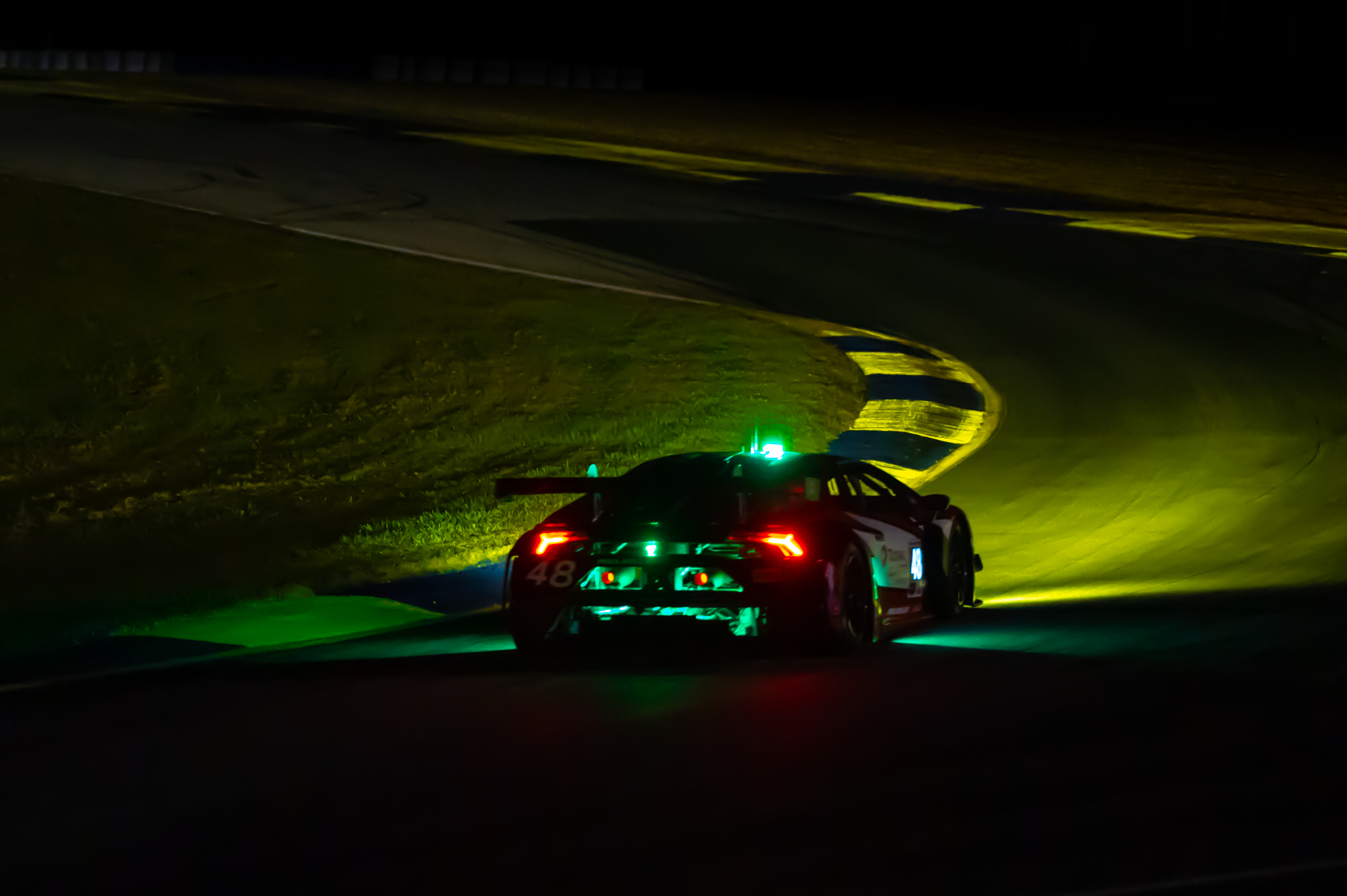
Lewis competing with Paul Miller Racing at Petit Le Mans in 2020

For 2018, alongside a return to the Lamborghini Super Trofeo North America, Lewis signed with P1 Motorsports to compete in the IMSA Prototype Challenge, sharing the No. 17 entry with Matt Dicken. Supplementing Lewis' 2018 schedule was a pair of endurance races with Paul Miller Racing, as he competed with the team at the Sebring and Petit Le Mans. In his opening race with the team, Paul Miller Racing claimed class honors, marking Lewis' first class victory at the 12 Hours of Sebring. Lewis' final triumph of 2018 came in November, where he and co-driver Madison Snow were crowned Pro-class champions of the Lamborghini Super Trofeo North America. He would defend his title the following season, before taking the Pro-Am class title in 2020.

In 2020, Lewis took his first class victory at the 24 Hours of Daytona, competing once again with Paul Miller Racing. Later that season, he made his return to the Michelin Pilot Challenge, the same series in which he began his sports car racing career seven years prior, signing with Canadian team Motorsport in Action. The team would score one victory that season, finishing ninth in points. His additional Lamborghini Super Trofeo commitments meant that he'd occasionally drive for three different teams, in three different cars and series in one race weekend.

In 2021, Lewis joined K-Pax Racing's two-car effort in the returning Pro class of the GT World Challenge America, partnering with Lamborghini factory driver Giovanni Venturini. Lewis and Venturini would score their first win for the team in May at Circuit of the Americas. After continuing to compete predominantly in Lamborghini machinery during 2021 and 2022, Lewis returned to Paul Miller Racing ahead of the 2023 IMSA SportsCar Championship season.

== Racing record ==
=== Career summary ===
Season	Series	Team	Races	Wins	Poles	F/Laps	Podiums	Points	Position
2007	Skip Barber Eastern Regional Series		6	6	6	?	6	90	29th
2008	Skip Barber Eastern Regional Series		14	8	10	?	11	682	**2nd**
2009	BFGoodrich / Skip Barber National Presented by Mazda		6	0	0	0	1	0	NC
2009	Star Mazda Winter Series	Team GDT	1	1	0	0	1	0	NC
2012	Star Mazda Championship	Team GDT	2	0	0	0	0	0	NC
2013	Continental Tire SportsCar Challenge - ST	?	3	0	0	0	0	32	60th
2013	Continental Tire SportsCar Challenge - GS	Doran Racing	1	0	0	0	0	14	60th
2014	Lamborghini Super Trofeo North America	Musante Motorsport	6	3	2	0	5	71	**3rd**
2014	Continental Tire Sports Car Challenge - ST	Berg Racing	10	1	1	1	2	166	24th
2014	Continental Tire Sports Car Challenge - GS	Racers Edge	1	0	0	0	0	20	67th
2014	United SportsCar Championship - GTD	Mühlner Motorsport America	1	0	0	0	0	18	89th
2015	Lamborghini Super Trofeo World Final - Pro-Am		2	0	0	0	2	30	**1st**
2015	Continental Tire SportsCar Challenge - ST	Strategic Wealth Racing	7	0	0	0	0	130	24th
2015	Continental Tire SportsCar Challenge - GS	Fall-Line Motorsports	0	0	0	0	0	0	48th
2016	Lamborghini Super Trofeo North America - Pro	Change Racing	2	1	0	0	2	27	4th
2016	IMSA SportsCar Championship - GTD	Change Racing	11	0	0	0	0	247	9th
2016	Continental Tire SportsCar Challenge - ST	Strategic Wealth Racing	10	0	0	0	1	182	10th
2016-17	Asian Le Mans Series - GT	VS Racing	3	0	0	0	1	27	9th
2017	Lamborghini Super Trofeo Europe - Pro-Am	Antonelli Motorsport	2	1	0	1	2	27	9th
2017	IMSA SportsCar Championship - GTD	Change Racing	11	1	0	0	1	237	17th
2017	Continental Tire SportsCar Challenge - ST	Strategic Wealth Racing	1	0	0	0	0	18	36th
2018	Lamborghini Super Trofeo North America - Pro	Change Racing	12	3	1	0	11	142	**1st**
2018	Lamborghini Super Trofeo World Final - Pro	Change Racing	2	0	0	0	0	8	10th
2018	IMSA Prototype Challenge - LMP3	P1 Motorsports	6	0	0	0	0	140	6th
2018	Pirelli World Challenge - GT	GMG Racing	2	0	0	0	0	34	17th
2018	IMSA SportsCar Championship - GTD	Paul Miller Racing	2	1	0	0	2	65	33rd
2019	Lamborghini Super Trofeo North America - Pro	Change Racing	12	3	0	1	10	124	**1st**
2019	Lamborghini Super Trofeo World Final - Pro	Change Racing	2	0	0	0	0	3	10th
2019	IMSA SportsCar Championship - GTD	Paul Miller Racing	8	1	2	0	2	185	13th
2019	Blancpain GT Series Endurance Cup	Ombra Racing	1	0	0	0	0	0	NC
2020	Lamborghini Super Trofeo North America - Pro-Am	Change Racing	10	5	2	4	8	104	**1st**
2020	Michelin Pilot Challenge - GS	Motorsport in Action	10	1	0	2	1	208	9th
2020	IMSA SportsCar Championship - GTD	Paul Miller Racing	4	1	0	0	2	109	24th
2021	GT World Challenge America - Pro	K-Pax Racing	13	2	0	1	10	234	**2nd**
2021	IMSA SportsCar Championship - GTD	Paul Miller Racing	5	0	1	0	2	1148	24th
2022	IMSA Prototype Challenge	MLT Motorsports	2	0	0	0	1	480	20th
2022	IMSA SportsCar Championship - GTD	CarBahn with Peregrine Racing	4	0	0	0	0	817	29th
2022	GT World Challenge America - Pro/Am	Zelus Motorsports	7	0	0	0	0	78	9th
2022	GT World Challenge America - Pro/Am	TR3 Racing	5	0	0	1	1	78	9th
2022	Intercontinental GT Challenge	TR3 Racing							
2023	GT World Challenge America - Pro/Am	DXDT Racing	13	0	0	0	1	77	10th
2023	Intercontinental GT Challenge	DXDT Racing	1	0	0	0	0	0	NC
2023	IMSA SportsCar Championship - GTD	Paul Miller Racing	4	1	0	0	2	1127	22nd
2024	IMSA SportsCar Championship - GTD	Proton Competition	10	0	0	0	0	2072	17th
2024	Michelin Pilot Challenge - GS	TGR Smooge Racing	1	0	0	0	0	190	58th
2024	GT4 America Series - Silver	TGR Smooge Racing	6	1	2	2	4	85	8th
2025	IMSA VP Racing SportsCar Challenge - LMP3	RAFA Racing Team	2	1	0	0	2	650	9th
2026	IMSA SportsCar Championship - GTD	Gradient Racing	7	0	0	0	0	1431	20th

^{*} Season still in progress.

=== Complete WeatherTech SportsCar Championship results ===
(key) (Races in bold indicate pole position)

Year	Team	Class	Make	Engine	1	2	3	4	5	6	7	8	9	10	11	12	Rank	Points
2014	Mühlner Motorsports America	GTD	Porsche 911 GT America	Porsche 4.0 L Flat-6	DAY	SEB	LGA	DET	WGL	MOS	IMS	ELK	VIR; 14	COA	PET		89th	18
2016	Change Racing	GTD	Lamborghini Huracán GT3	Lamborghini 5.2L V10	DAY; 18	SEB; 14	LGA; 10	DET; 6	WGL; 9	MOS; 5	**LIM**; 8	ELK; 14	VIR; 5	COA; 9	PET; 10		9th	247
2017	Change Racing	GTD	Lamborghini Huracán GT3	Lamborghini 5.2L V10	DAY; 25	SEB; 11	LBH; 8	COA; 17	DET; 11	WGL; 17	MOS; 6	LIM; 11	**ELK**; 13	**VIR**; 1	LGA; 9	PET; 11	17th	237
2018	Paul Miller Racing	GTD	Lamborghini Huracán GT3	Lamborghini 5.2L V10	DAY	SEB; 1	MDO	DET	WGL	MOS	LIM	ELK	VIR	LGA	PET; 3		33rd	65
2019	Paul Miller Racing	GTD	Lamborghini Huracán GT3 Evo	Lamborghini 5.2L V10	DAY; 15	SEB; 16	MDO	DET	WGL; 14	MOS	LIM; 7	ELK; 2	VIR; 10	**LGA**; 1	**PET**; 6		13th	185
2020	Paul Miller Racing	GTD	Lamborghini Huracán GT3 Evo	Lamborghini 5.2L V10	DAY; 1	DAY	SEB	ELK	VIR	ATL; 2	MDO	CLT	PET; 7	LGA	SEB; 13		24th	109
2021	Paul Miller Racing	GTD	Lamborghini Huracán GT3 Evo	Lamborghini 5.2L V10	DAY; 3	SEB; 11	MDO	DET	WGL; 2	WGL	LIM	ELK	LGA	LBH	VIR	**PET**; 7	24th	1148
2022	CarBahn with Peregrine Racing	GTD	Lamborghini Huracán GT3 Evo	Lamborghini 5.2 L V10	DAY; 17	SEB; 13	LBH	LGA	MDO	DET	WGL; 7	MOS	LIM	ELK	VIR	PET; 15	29th	817
2023	Paul Miller Racing	GTD	BMW M4 GT3	BMW S58B30T0 3.0 L Twin-Turbo I6	DAY; 8	SEB; 1	LBH	MON	WGL; 2	MOS	LIM	ELK	VIR	IMS	PET; 18		22nd	1127
2024	Proton Competition	GTD	Ford Mustang GT3	Ford Coyote 5.4 L V8	DAY; 20	SEB; 16	LBH; 5	LGA; 7	WGL; 17	MOS; 12	ELK; 8	**VIR**; 7	IMS; 17	PET; 17			15th	2072
2026	Gradient Racing	GTD	Ford Mustang GT3 Evo	Ford Coyote 5.4 L V8	DAY; 18	SEB	LBH; 16	LGA; 9	WGL; 12	MOS; 11	ELK	VIR; 10	IMS; 7	PET			20th	1431

Sporting positions
Preceded by Riccardo Agostini; Trent Hindman	Lamborghini Super Trofeo North America; Pro Champion; 2018, 2019; With: Madison Snow; Richard Antinucci	Succeeded by Madison Snow
