= 2008 Formula V6 Asia Championship =

Motor racing competition

2008 Formula V6 Asia

Seasons
- ← 2007 2009 →

The 2008 Formula V6 Asia season took place in four Asian countries. The season started on May 16–18 in Sepang and ended on November 21–23 in Shanghai.

== Drivers and teams ==
Team	No	Driver	Rounds
(Malaysia) Black Tara	3	(India) Armaan Ebrahim	1–3
(Malaysia) Black Tara	8	(Singapore) Isaiah-Ro Charlez	All
(Hong Kong) Champ Motorsport	4	(Taiwan) Kevin Chen	All
(Hong Kong) Champ Motorsport	27	(France) Mathias Beche	2
(Hong Kong) Champ Motorsport	27	(Macau) Michael Ho	4–6
(South Korea) Team E-Rain	5	(South Korea) Recardo Bruins Choi	2–3
(South Korea) Team E-Rain	5	(Sri Lanka) Dilantha Malagamuwa	4
(South Korea) Team E-Rain	7	(Indonesia) Robin Tato	All
(Malaysia) Mahara	18	(Japan) Katsuhiro Konno	1
(Malaysia) Team Tarateam	31	(Singapore) Hafiz Koh	All
(Malaysia) Team Tarateam	33	(Australia) Mark Williamson	All
(Malaysia) TPC Team QI-Meritus	38	(Thailand) James Grunwell	All
(Malaysia) TPC Team QI-Meritus	88	(New Zealand) Earl Bamber	1–4

== Race calendar ==
Round	Location	Circuit	Date	Pole position	Fastest lap	Winning driver	Winning team
1	Sepang, Malaysia	Sepang International Circuit	May 16–18	(Thailand) James Grunwell	(New Zealand) Earl Bamber	(India) Armaan Ebrahim	(Malaysia) Black Tara
2	Sepang, Malaysia	Sepang International Circuit	May 16–18	(Thailand) James Grunwell	(New Zealand) Earl Bamber	(New Zealand) Earl Bamber	(Malaysia) TPC Team QI-Meritus
3	Sepang, Malaysia	Sepang International Circuit	June 20–22	(Thailand) James Grunwell	(India) Armaan Ebrahim	(Thailand) James Grunwell	(Malaysia) TPC Team QI-Meritus
4	Sepang, Malaysia	Sepang International Circuit	June 20–22		(Thailand) James Grunwell	(India) Armaan Ebrahim	(Malaysia) Black Tara
5	Sentul, Indonesia	Sentul International Circuit	July 18–20	(New Zealand) Earl Bamber	(New Zealand) Earl Bamber	(New Zealand) Earl Bamber	(Malaysia) TPC Team QI-Meritus
6	Sentul, Indonesia	Sentul International Circuit	July 18–20	(New Zealand) Earl Bamber	(New Zealand) Earl Bamber	(New Zealand) Earl Bamber	(Malaysia) TPC Team QI-Meritus
7	Okayama, Japan	Okayama International Circuit	October 24–26	(New Zealand) Earl Bamber	(New Zealand) Earl Bamber	(New Zealand) Earl Bamber	(Malaysia) TPC Team QI-Meritus
8	Okayama, Japan	Okayama International Circuit	October 24–26		(New Zealand) Earl Bamber	(New Zealand) Earl Bamber	(Malaysia) TPC Team QI-Meritus
9	Shanghai, China	Shanghai International Circuit	November 21–23	(Taiwan) Kevin Chen	(Thailand) James Grunwell	(Thailand) James Grunwell	(Malaysia) TPC Team QI-Meritus
10	Shanghai, China	Shanghai International Circuit	November 21–23		(Taiwan) Kevin Chen	(Thailand) James Grunwell	(Malaysia) TPC Team QI-Meritus
11	Shanghai, China	Shanghai International Circuit	November 21–23		(Thailand) James Grunwell	(Thailand) James Grunwell	(Malaysia) TPC Team QI-Meritus
12	Shanghai, China	Shanghai International Circuit	November 21–23		(Singapore) Isaiah-Ro Charlez	(Singapore) Isaiah-Ro Charlez	(Malaysia) Black Tara

Earl Bamber and Armaan Ebrahim did not participate to the last venue due to their commitment in the Malaysian round in A1 Grand Prix.

== Full Series Results ==
Points are awarded in both races as following: 15, 12, 10, 8, 6, 5, 4, 3, 2 for 9th and 1 bonus points for pole position in the first of the two venue races but only awarded to drivers, not for teams. Only the drivers that achieve races are awarded by points. The team standing is obtained with the best two drivers of each team at each race

=== Drivers ===
Pos	Driver	MAL1 (Malaysia)		MAL2 (Malaysia)		IND (Indonesia)		JAP (Japan)		CHN (China)				Points
Pos	Driver	1	2	3	4	5	6	7	8	9	10	11	12	Points
1	(Thailand) James Grunwell	3	3	1	3	2	2	2	Ret	1	1	1	6	133
2	(New Zealand) Earl Bamber	2	1	7	2	1	1	1	1					105
3	(Singapore) Isaiah-Ro Charlez	7	2	Ret	4	5	7	3	2	Ret	7	3	1	85
4	(Australia) Mark Williamson	8	5	4	5	8	8	6	4	5	3	2	3	79
5	(Singapore) Hafiz Koh	6	Ret	6	Ret	6	4	4	3	3	2	4	5	77
6	(Taiwan) Kevin Chen	4	4	3	Ret	7	3	Ret	Ret	2	4	Ret	2	73
7	(India) Armaan Ebrahim	1	7	2	1	3	8							59
8	(Indonesia) Robin Tato	5	6	5	6	9	Ret	7	Ret	Ret	5	Ret	5	42
9	(Macau) Michael Ho							5	Ret	4	6	DNS	DNS	19
10	(South Korea) Recardo Bruins			Ret	Ret	4	5							14
11	(Sri Lanka) Dilantha Malagamuwa							DNS	5					6
12	(Japan) Katsuhiro Konno	Ret	Ret											0
13	(France) Mathias Beche			Ret	Ret									0
Pos	Driver	MAL1 (Malaysia)		MAL2 (Malaysia)		IND (Indonesia)		JAP (Japan)		CHN (China)				Points
Pos	Driver	1	2	3	4	5	6	7	8	9	10	11	12	Points

Colour	Result
Gold	Winner
Silver	Second place
Bronze	Third place
Green	Points classification
Blue	Non-points classification
Blue	Non-classified finish (NC)
Purple	Retired, not classified (Ret)
Red	Did not qualify (DNQ)
Red	Did not pre-qualify (DNPQ)
Black	Disqualified (DSQ)
White	Did not start (DNS)
White	Withdrew (WD)
White	Race cancelled (C)
Blank	Did not practice (DNP)
Blank	Did not arrive (DNA)
Blank	Excluded (EX)

=== Teams ===
Pos	Team	Drivers	MAL1 (Malaysia)		MAL2 (Malaysia)		IND (Indonesia)		JAP (Japan)		CHN (China)				Points
Pos	Team	Drivers	1	2	3	4	5	6	7	8	9	10	11	12	Points
1	(Malaysia) The Pizza Company Team QI-Meritus	James Grunwell	3	3	1	3*	2	2	2	Ret	1*	1	1*	6	234
1	(Malaysia) The Pizza Company Team QI-Meritus	Earl Bamber	2*	1*	7	2	1*	1*	1*	1*					234
2	(Malaysia) Team TARADTM	Mark Williamson	8	5	4	5	6	8	6	4	5	3	2	3	156
2	(Malaysia) Team TARADTM	Hafiz Koh	6	Ret	6	Ret	6	4	4	3	3	2	4	5	156
3	(Malaysia) Black Tara	Isaiah-Ro Charlez	7	2	Ret	4	5	7	3	2	Ret	7	3	1*	144
3	(Malaysia) Black Tara	Armaan Ebrahim	1	7	2*	1	3	8							144
4	(Hong Kong) Champ Motorsport	Kevin Chen	4	4	3	Ret	7	3	Ret	Ret	2	4*	Ret	2	91
4	(Hong Kong) Champ Motorsport	Michael Ho							5	Ret	4	6	DNS	DNS	91
4	(Hong Kong) Champ Motorsport	Mathias Beche			Ret	Ret									91
5	(South Korea) Team E-Rain	Robin Tato	5	6	5	6	9	Ret	7	Ret	Ret	5	Ret	5	62
5	(South Korea) Team E-Rain	Recardo Bruins			Ret	Ret	4	5							62
5	(South Korea) Team E-Rain	Dilantha Malagamuwa							DNS	5					62
NC	(Malaysia) Mahara	Katsuhiro Konno	Ret	Ret											0
Pos	Team	Drivers	MAL1 (Malaysia)		MAL2 (Malaysia)		IND (Indonesia)		JAP (Japan)		CHN (China)				Points
Pos	Team	Drivers	1	2	3	4	5	6	7	8	9	10	11	12	Points
