= 2015 Lamborghini Super Trofeo =

Seasons
- ← 2014 2016 →

The 2015 Lamborghini Super Trofeo season was the seventh season of the European Super Trofeo, the third season of the North American Super Trofeo and the fourth season of the Asian Super Trofeo. Every championship featured six double-header rounds, with each race lasting for a duration of 50 minutes. 2015 marked the first season of the Huracán LP620-2 Super Trofeo.

The 2015 Super Trofeo World Final was held from 19 to 22 November at Sebring International Raceway.

== Super Trofeo Europe ==
=== Calendar ===
Rnd	Circuit	Date
1	Autodromo Nazionale Monza, Monza, Italy	11–12 April
2	(United Kingdom) Silverstone Circuit, Silverstone, Great Britain	22–24 May
3	Circuit Paul Ricard, Le Castellet, France	19–21 June
4	Circuit de Spa-Francorchamps, Belgium	22–26 July
5	Nürburgring, Nürburg, Germany	18–20 September
6	(United States) Sebring International Raceway, Sebring, Florida	20–21 November

=== Entries ===
Icon	Class
P	Pro
PA	Pro-Am
AM	Am
GA	Gallardo Am

Team	Car	No.	Drivers	Class	Rounds
(Italy) Antonelli Motorsport	Lamborghini Huracán LP 620-2 Super Trofeo	3	(Russia) Roman Mavlanov	P	All
(Italy) Antonelli Motorsport	Lamborghini Huracán LP 620-2 Super Trofeo	3	(Italy) Daniel Zampieri	P	1–4
(Italy) Antonelli Motorsport	Lamborghini Huracán LP 620-2 Super Trofeo	11	(Italy) Simone Pellegrinelli	AM	All
(Italy) Antonelli Motorsport	Lamborghini Huracán LP 620-2 Super Trofeo	38	(Italy) Loris Spinelli	PA	All
(Italy) Antonelli Motorsport	Lamborghini Huracán LP 620-2 Super Trofeo	77	(Switzerland) Adrian Amstutz	PA	2–6
(Italy) Antonelli Motorsport	Lamborghini Huracán LP 620-2 Super Trofeo	77	(Russia) Mikhail Stepanov	PA	All
(Georgia (country)) Artline Team Georgia	Lamborghini Huracán LP 620-2 Super Trofeo	2	(Belgium) Sarah Bovy	PA	1–2
(Georgia (country)) Artline Team Georgia	Lamborghini Huracán LP 620-2 Super Trofeo	2	(Australia) Ben Gersekowski	PA	1–2
(Georgia (country)) Artline Team Georgia	Lamborghini Huracán LP 620-2 Super Trofeo	2	(Russia) Shota Abkhazava	AM	3–6
(Belgium) Boutsen Ginion Racing	Lamborghini Huracán LP 620-2 Super Trofeo	15	(Belgium) Renaud Kuppens	PA	4
(Belgium) Boutsen Ginion Racing	Lamborghini Huracán LP 620-2 Super Trofeo	15	(Belgium) Bernard Delhez	PA	4
(Italy) Bonaldi Motorsport	Lamborghini Huracán LP 620-2 Super Trofeo	22	(Italy) Marco Moscato	PA	All
(Italy) Bonaldi Motorsport	Lamborghini Huracán LP 620-2 Super Trofeo	32	(Finland) Patrick Kujala	P	All
(Italy) Bonaldi Motorsport	Lamborghini Huracán LP 620-2 Super Trofeo	33	(Finland) Mikko Eskelinen	PA	All
(Italy) Bonaldi Motorsport	Lamborghini Huracán LP 620-2 Super Trofeo	35	(Germany) Florian Spengler	P	1–3
(Italy) Bonaldi Motorsport	Lamborghini Huracán LP 620-2 Super Trofeo	36	(Italy) Matteo Bobbi	PA	1
(Italy) Bonaldi Motorsport	Lamborghini Gallardo LP 570-4 Super Trofeo	34	(Puerto Rico) Ricardo Vera	GA	1–2, 4–5
(Italy) Bonaldi Motorsport	Lamborghini Gallardo LP 570-4 Super Trofeo	34	(Italy) Andres Josephson	GA	1–2, 5
(Italy) Bonaldi Motorsport	Lamborghini Gallardo LP 570-4 Super Trofeo	34	(South Africa) David Perel	GA	4
(Germany) Konrad Motorsport	Lamborghini Huracán LP 620-2 Super Trofeo	21	(Switzerland) Adrian Amstutz	PA	1
(Germany) Konrad Motorsport	Lamborghini Huracán LP 620-2 Super Trofeo	21	(Germany) Dennis Trebbing	PA	1
(Germany) Konrad Motorsport	Lamborghini Gallardo LP 570-4 Super Trofeo	29	(Switzerland) Mark Ineichen	GA	1
(Germany) Leipert Motorsport	Lamborghini Huracán LP 620-2 Super Trofeo	9	(Latvia) Harald Schlegelmilch	PA	All
(Germany) Leipert Motorsport	Lamborghini Huracán LP 620-2 Super Trofeo	9	(Finland) Mikko Eskelinen	PA	All
(Germany) Leipert Motorsport	Lamborghini Huracán LP 620-2 Super Trofeo	10	(Germany) Jürgen Krebs	AM	All
(Belgium) DVB Racing	Lamborghini Gallardo LP 570-4 Super Trofeo	24	(Belgium) Jan van Uytsel	GA	All
(Belgium) DVB Racing	Lamborghini Gallardo LP 570-4 Super Trofeo	24	(Belgium) Raf Vleugels	GA	All
(United Kingdom) Mtech	Lamborghini Huracán LP 620-2 Super Trofeo	41	(Netherlands) Jaap Bartels	PA	2, 4, 6
(United Kingdom) Mtech	Lamborghini Huracán LP 620-2 Super Trofeo	41	(United Kingdom) Jake Rattenbury	PA	2, 4, 6
(Italy) Raton Racing	Lamborghini Huracán LP 620-2 Super Trofeo	90	(Italy) Edoardo Liberati	P	All
(Italy) Raton Racing	Lamborghini Huracán LP 620-2 Super Trofeo	90	(Switzerland) Patric Niederhauser	P	All
(Italy) Target Racing	Lamborghini Huracán LP 620-2 Super Trofeo	26	(Italy) Andrea Ceccato	PA	1–4
(Italy) Target Racing	Lamborghini Huracán LP 620-2 Super Trofeo	26	(Italy) Davide Roda	PA	1–4
(Portugal) Veloso Motorsport	Lamborghini Gallardo LP 570-4 Super Trofeo	13	(Portugal) Eugénio Montez	GA	1, 3–6
(Portugal) Veloso Motorsport	Lamborghini Gallardo LP 570-4 Super Trofeo	13	(Portugal) Sérgio Montez	GA	1, 3–6
(Italy) Automobile Tricolore	Lamborghini Huracán LP 620-2 Super Trofeo	66	(Italy) Raffaele Giannoni	AM	All
(Italy) Automobile Tricolore	Lamborghini Huracán LP 620-2 Super Trofeo	66	(Serbia) Miloš Pavlović	AM	3–6
(Switzerland) X Bionic Racing Team	Lamborghini Huracán LP 620-2 Super Trofeo	63	(Switzerland) Laurent Jenny	AM	All
(Switzerland) X Bionic Racing Team	Lamborghini Huracán LP 620-2 Super Trofeo	63	(Switzerland) Cédric Leimer	AM	All
(Switzerland) X Bionic Racing Team	Lamborghini Gallardo LP 570-4 Super Trofeo	19	(Switzerland) Cyril Leimer	GA	All
(Italy) Imperiale Racing	Lamborghini Huracán LP 620-2 Super Trofeo	5	(Italy) Alberto Cerqui	P	3–4
(Italy) Imperiale Racing	Lamborghini Huracán LP 620-2 Super Trofeo	5	(Italy) Giacomo Barri	P	3–4
(Italy) Imperiale Racing	Lamborghini Gallardo LP 570-4 Super Trofeo	44	(Switzerland) Davide Durante	GA	All
(Italy) Imperiale Racing	Lamborghini Gallardo LP 570-4 Super Trofeo	44	(Venezuela) Juan Cayo Azcárate	GA	3, 5
(Italy) Imperiale Racing	Lamborghini Gallardo LP 570-4 Super Trofeo	88	(Portugal) Carina Lima	GA	1, 3
(Italy) Imperiale Racing	Lamborghini Gallardo LP 570-4 Super Trofeo	88	(Italy) Andrea Palma	GA	1, 3
(Italy) Imperiale Racing	Lamborghini Gallardo LP 570-4 Super Trofeo	74	(Italy) Ivan Benvenuti	GA	6
(Netherlands) Van der Horst Motorsport	Lamborghini Gallardo LP 570-4 Super Trofeo	98	(Netherlands) Gerard van der Horst	GA	All
(Netherlands) Van der Horst Motorsport	Lamborghini Gallardo LP 570-4 Super Trofeo	99	(Netherlands) William van der Horst	GA	All
(Italy) Vincenzo Sospiri Racing	Lamborghini Huracán LP 620-2 Super Trofeo	64	(Japan) Kei Cozzolino	P	4
(Italy) Vincenzo Sospiri Racing	Lamborghini Huracán LP 620-2 Super Trofeo	64	(United States) Shinya Michimi	P	4
(Italy) Team Lazarus	Lamborghini Huracán LP 620-2 Super Trofeo	4	(Italy) Sergio Campana	P	1–3, 5
(Italy) Team Lazarus	Lamborghini Huracán LP 620-2 Super Trofeo	4	(Italy) Fabrizio Crestani	P	1
(Italy) Team Lazarus	Lamborghini Huracán LP 620-2 Super Trofeo	77	(Thailand) Supachai Weeraborwornpong	PA	1–5
(Switzerland) Sportec Motorsport	Lamborghini Huracán LP 620-2 Super Trofeo	55	(Switzerland) Christoph Lenz	AM	1–5
(Switzerland) Sportec Motorsport	Lamborghini Huracán LP 620-2 Super Trofeo	55	(Germany) Siegfried Vanema	AM	1
(Switzerland) Sportec Motorsport	Lamborghini Huracán LP 620-2 Super Trofeo	55	(Germany) Michael Schaal	AM	1

=== Results summary ===
Round		Circuit	Pro Winning Team	Pro-Am Winning Team	Am Winning Team	Gallardo Am Winning Team
Round		Circuit	Pro Winning Driver	Pro-Am Winning Driver	Am Winning Driver	Gallardo Am Winning Driver
1	R1	(Italy) Monza	#32 (Italy) Bonaldi Motorsport	#3 (Italy) Bonaldi Motorsport	#11 (Germany) Konrad Motorsport	#88 (Italy) Imperiale Racing
1	R1	(Italy) Monza	(Finland) Patrick Kujala	(Italy) Matteo Bobbi (United Kingdom) Jay Palmer	(Switzerland) Mark Ineichen	(Portugal) Carina Lima (Italy) Andrea Palma
1	R2	(Italy) Monza	#32 (Italy) Bonaldi Motorsport	#16 (Italy) Vincenzo Sospiri Racing	#78 (Russia) Artline Team Georgia	#74 (Italy) Imperiale Racing
1	R2	(Italy) Monza	(Finland) Patrick Kujala	(Italy) Kei Cozzolino (Japan) Shinya Michimi	(Georgia (country)) Shota Abkhazava	(Switzerland) Davide Durante (Venezuela) Juan Cayo Azcárate
2	R1	(United Kingdom) Silverstone	#32 (Italy) Bonaldi Motorsport	#15 (Italy) Antonelli Motorsport	#63 (Switzerland) X Bionic Racing Team	#19 (Switzerland) X Bionic Racing Team
2	R1	(United Kingdom) Silverstone	(Finland) Patrick Kujala	(Italy) Marco Moscato (Italy) Loris Spinelli	(Switzerland) Laurent Jenny (Switzerland) Cédric Leimer	(Switzerland) Cyril Leimer
2	R2	(United Kingdom) Silverstone	#32 (Italy) Bonaldi Motorsport	#10 (Germany) Konrad Motorsport	#78 (Russia) Artline Team Georgia	#34 (Italy) Bonaldi Motorsport
2	R2	(United Kingdom) Silverstone	(Finland) Patrick Kujala	(Switzerland) Adrian Amstutz	(Georgia (country)) Shota Abkhazava	(Argentina) Andres Josephson (Puerto Rico) Ricardo Vera
3	R1	(France) Paul Ricard	#32 (Italy) Bonaldi Motorsport	#10 (Germany) Konrad Motorsport	#13 (United Kingdom) Sportech Motorsport	#88 (Italy) Imperiale Racing
3	R1	(France) Paul Ricard	(Finland) Patrick Kujala	(Switzerland) Adrian Amstutz	(Germany) Jürgen Krebs	(Portugal) Carina Lima (Italy) Andrea Palma
3	R2	(France) Paul Ricard	#5 (Italy) Antonelli Motorsport	#96 (Italy) Automobile Tricolore	#63 (Switzerland) X Bionic Racing Team	#88 (Italy) Imperiale Racing
3	R2	(France) Paul Ricard	(Russia) Roman Mavlanov (Italy) Daniel Zampieri	(Italy) Raffaele Giannoni (Serbia) Miloš Pavlović	(Switzerland) Laurent Jenny (Switzerland) Cédric Leimer	(Portugal) Carina Lima (Italy) Andrea Palma
4	R1	(Belgium) Spa-Francorchamps	#90 (Italy) Raton Racing	#15 (Italy) Antonelli Motorsport	#99 (Italy) Kinetic Racing Team	#34 (Italy) Bonaldi Motorsport
4	R1	(Belgium) Spa-Francorchamps	(Italy) Alberto Di Folco	(Italy) Marco Moscato (Italy) Loris Spinelli	(Russia) Mikhail Spiridonov	(South Africa) David Perel (Puerto Rico) Ricardo Vera
4	R2	(Belgium) Spa-Francorchamps	#32 (Italy) Bonaldi Motorsport	#31 (Italy) Imperiale Racing	#78 (Russia) Artline Team Georgia	#34 (Italy) Bonaldi Motorsport
4	R2	(Belgium) Spa-Francorchamps	(Finland) Patrick Kujala	(Italy) Simone Pellegrinelli	(Georgia (country)) Shota Abkhazava	(South Africa) David Perel (Puerto Rico) Ricardo Vera
5	R1	(Germany) Nürburgring	#32 (Italy) Bonaldi Motorsport	#31 (Italy) Imperiale Racing	#99 (Italy) Kinetic Racing Team	#34 (Italy) Bonaldi Motorsport
5	R1	(Germany) Nürburgring	(Finland) Patrick Kujala	(Italy) Simone Pellegrinelli	(Italy) Roberto Silva (Russia) Mikhail Spiridonov	(Argentina) Andres Josephson (Puerto Rico) Ricardo Vera
5	R2	(Germany) Nürburgring	#32 (Italy) Bonaldi Motorsport	#3 (Italy) Bonaldi Motorsport	#18 (Italy) Vincenzo Sospiri Racing	#24 (Belgium) DVB Racing
5	R2	(Germany) Nürburgring	(Finland) Patrick Kujala	(Ecuador) Sebastián Merchán	(Netherlands) Jaap Bartels (Italy) Jacopo Faccioni	(Belgium) Jan van Uytsel (Belgium) Raf Vleugels
6	R1	(United States) Sebring	#32 (Italy) Bonaldi Motorsport	#15 (Italy) Antonelli Motorsport	#63 (Switzerland) X Bionic Racing Team	#34 (Italy) Bonaldi Motorsport
6	R1	(United States) Sebring	(Finland) Patrick Kujala	(Italy) Riccardo Agostini (Italy) Loris Spinelli	(Switzerland) Laurent Jenny (Switzerland) Cédric Leimer	(Argentina) Andres Josephson (Puerto Rico) Ricardo Vera
6	R2	(United States) Sebring	#90 (Italy) Raton Racing	Artline Team Georgia	#63 (Switzerland) X Bionic Racing Team	#74 (Italy) Imperiale Racing
6	R2	(United States) Sebring	(Italy) Alberto Di Folco	(Latvia) Harald Schlegelmich (Russia) Michail Stepanov	(Switzerland) Laurent Jenny (Switzerland) Cédric Leimer	(Italy) Ivan Benvenuti

== Super Trofeo North America ==
=== Calendar ===
Rnd	Circuit	Date
1	(United States) Mazda Raceway Laguna Seca, Monterey, California	1–3 May
2	(United States) Watkins Glen International, Watkins Glen, New York	26–28 June
3	(United States) Virginia International Raceway, Alton, Virginia	21–23 August
4	(United States) Circuit of the Americas, Elroy, Texas	17–19 September
5	(United States) Road Atlanta, Braselton, Georgia	1–3 October
6	(United States) Sebring International Raceway, Sebring, Florida	19–20 November

== Super Trofeo Asia ==
=== Calendar ===
Rnd	Circuit	Date
1	Fuji Speedway, Oyama, Japan	20–21 June
2	Shanghai International Circuit, Shanghai, China	11–12 July
3	Kuala Lumpur Street Circuit, Kuala Lumpur, Malaysia	8–9 August
4	Sentul International Circuit, Bogor, Indonesia	5–6 September
5	Shanghai International Circuit, Shanghai, China	17–18 October
6	(United States) Sebring International Raceway, Sebring, Florida	20–22 November

=== Results summary ===
Round		Circuit	Pole position	Pro Winners	Pro-Am Winners	Am Winners	LC Winners
1	R1	(Japan) Fuji Speedway	No. 37	No. 33	No. 96	No. 39	No. 71
1	R1	(Japan) Fuji Speedway	(Italy) Davide Rizzo	(Malaysia) Afiq Yazid	(China) Li Chao (China) Zhang Dasheng	(Japan) Akira Mizutani (Japan) Hajime Noma	(Thailand) Supachai Weeraborwornpong
1	R2	(Japan) Fuji Speedway	No. 37	No. 37	(Sri Lanka) No. 24 Dilango Racing	No. 68	No. 71
1	R2	(Japan) Fuji Speedway	(Italy) Davide Rizzo	(Italy) Davide Rizzo	(Sri Lanka) Dilantha Malagamuwa (India) Armaan Ebrahim	(Hong Kong) Michael Choi (Hong Kong) Keith Chan	(Thailand) Supachai Weeraborwornpong
2	R1	(China) Shanghai International Circuit					
2	R2	(China) Shanghai International Circuit					
3	R1	(Malaysia) Kuala Lumpur Street Circuit					
3	R2	(Malaysia) Kuala Lumpur Street Circuit					
4	R1	(Indonesia) Sentul International Circuit					
4	R2	(Indonesia) Sentul International Circuit					
5	R1	(China) Shanghai International Circuit					
5	R2	(China) Shanghai International Circuit					
6	R1	(United States) Sebring International Raceway					
6	R2	(United States) Sebring International Raceway					
