= Patrick Kujala =

Spanish-born professional racing driver (born 1996)

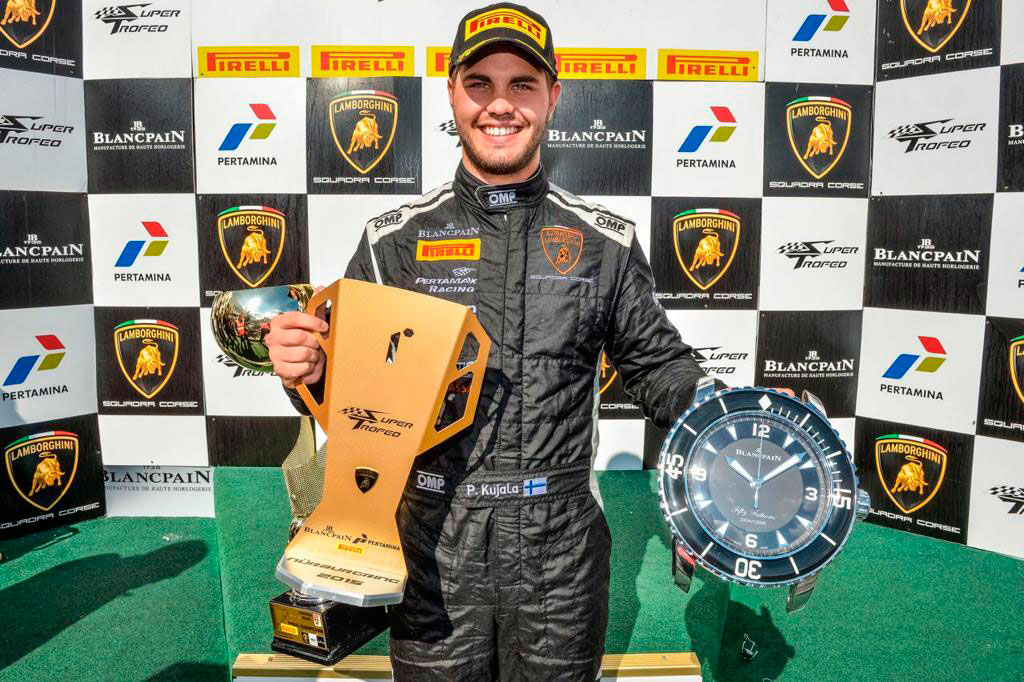
- Nationality: (Finland) Finnish (Spain) Spanish via dual nationality
- Born: 15 May 1996 (age 30) Marbella, Spain
- Categorisation: FIA Silver (until 2022); FIA Gold (2023–)
- Former teams: Auto Sport Academy, Koiranen Motorsport, Koiranen GP, Marussia Manor Racing, Trident, Bonaldi Motorsport, Barwell Motorsport, RAM Racing, Rinaldi Racing
- Starts: 33
- Wins: 8
- Poles: 7
- Fastest laps: 6
- Best finish: 1st in 2015

Previous series
- 2011 2012 2012 2013, 2014 2015 2016 2017 2017 2019 2020 2021 2021: French F4-series Eurocup Formula Renault 2.0; Formula Renault Alps 2.0; GP3 Series; Lamborghini Super Trofeo; Lamborghini Super Trofeo; ADAC GT Masters; Blancpain GT Series; Porsche Carrera Cup Italia; GT World Challenge; British GT Asian LeMans Series

Championship titles
- 2015 2016 2018 2020 2021: Lamborghini Super Trofeo Europe; Lamborghini Super Trofeo Europe; Total 24H SPA; GT World Challenge Sprint; TotalEnergies 24h SPA

Patrick Kujala (born 15 May 1996) is a Spanish-born Finnish professional racing driver.

== Career ==
=== Karting ===
Kujala started his career at the age of four, as he drove his first laps behind the steering wheel of a karting car, after which he competed in various Spanish karting series from 2005 to 2009.

At the age of nine, Kujala won the Andalucian Karting Championship series in the Alevin category, and at the age of ten, he won the title in Cadet category.

In 2007, Kujala finished ninth in the Cadet class of Spanish karting, and in 2009 he finished 6th fastest in the KF3-class.

=== Formula Renault ===
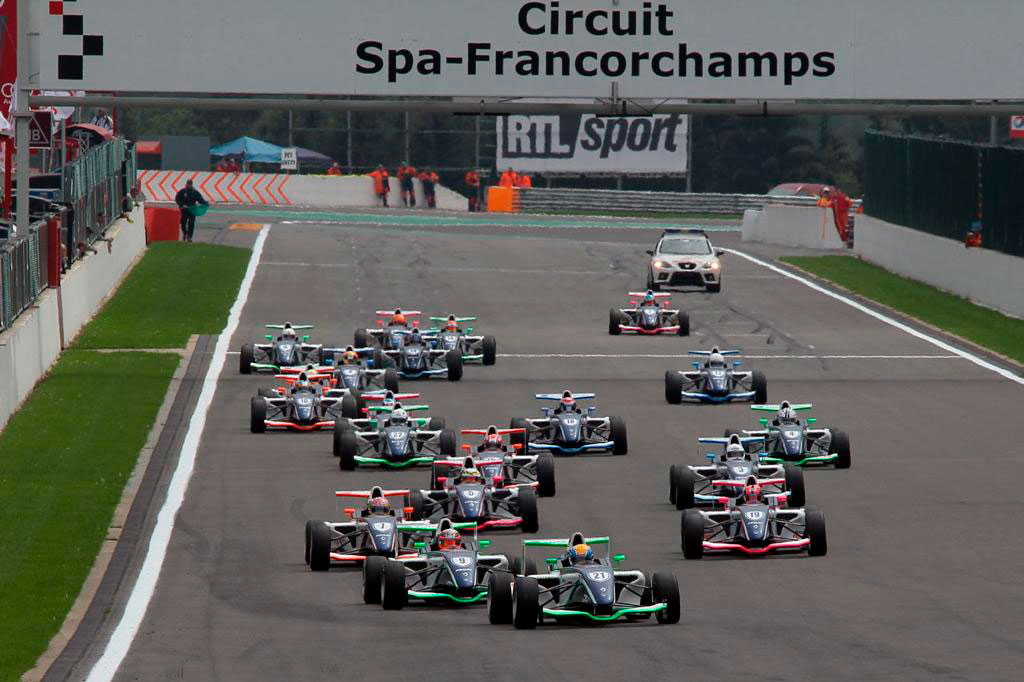
Kujala competed in the French F4 Championship in 2011 and 2012.

Kujala debuted in single-seaters in 2011, joining the French F4 Championship series, finishing fifth in the standings, taking one race victory at Spa-Francorchamps.

In 2012, Kujala moved up to Formula Renault Eurocup 2.0 and Formula Renault 2.0 Alps with the Koiranen Motorsport team. He finished 23rd in the Formula Renault 2.0 standings, and sixth in Formula Renault 2.0 Alps, also taking the title of Juniors' championship.

=== GP3 Series ===
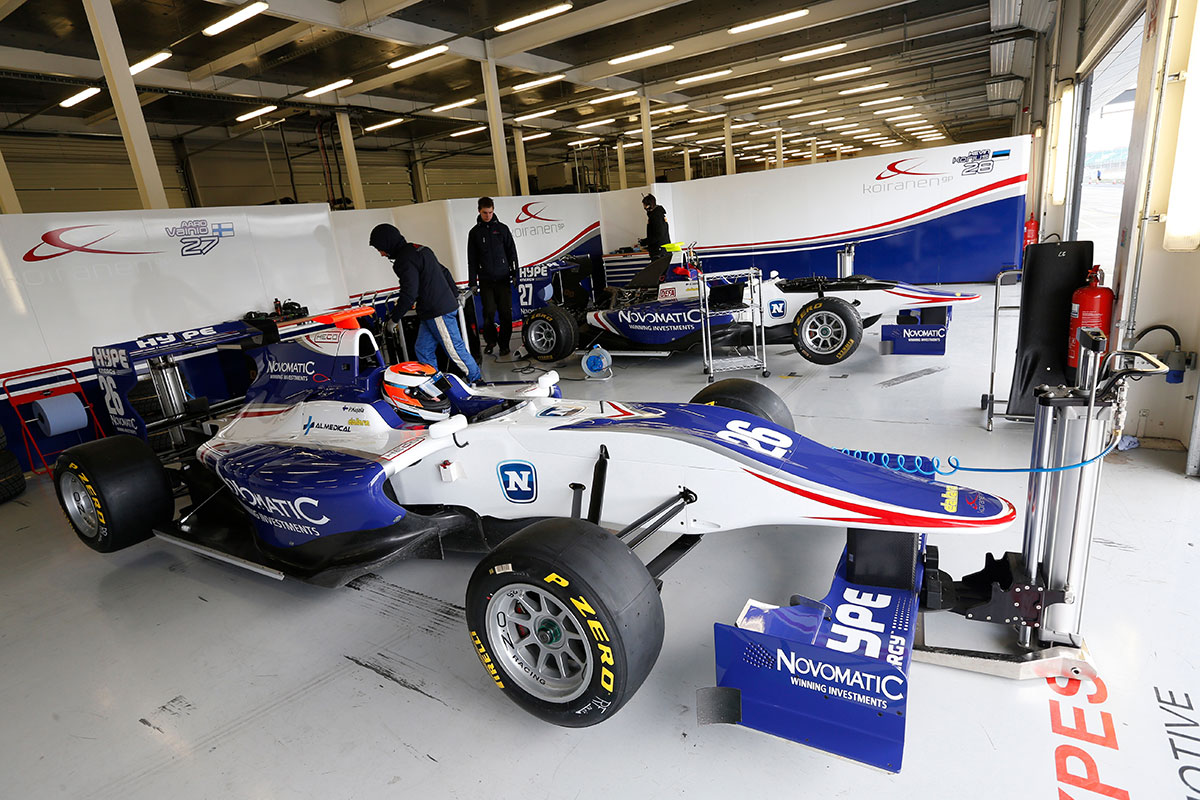
Kujala drove for Koiranen GP in the 2013 GP3 Series.

Kujala continued his collaboration with Koiranen GP in 2013, joining the GP3 Series. He had a difficult season with the Dallara GP3/13 car, as he only scored five points and finished 20th in the final standings.

Kujala continued racing in GP3 in 2014, joining the Marussia Manor Racing team. He started the season well, qualifying fifth at the season opener in Barcelona and finished the opening race in fourth place. However, Marussia Manor Racing pulled out with two rounds remaining in the season, forcing him to join the Trident team for the final two rounds. He finished 14th in the final standings with 22 points.

=== Lamborghini Squadra Corse ===
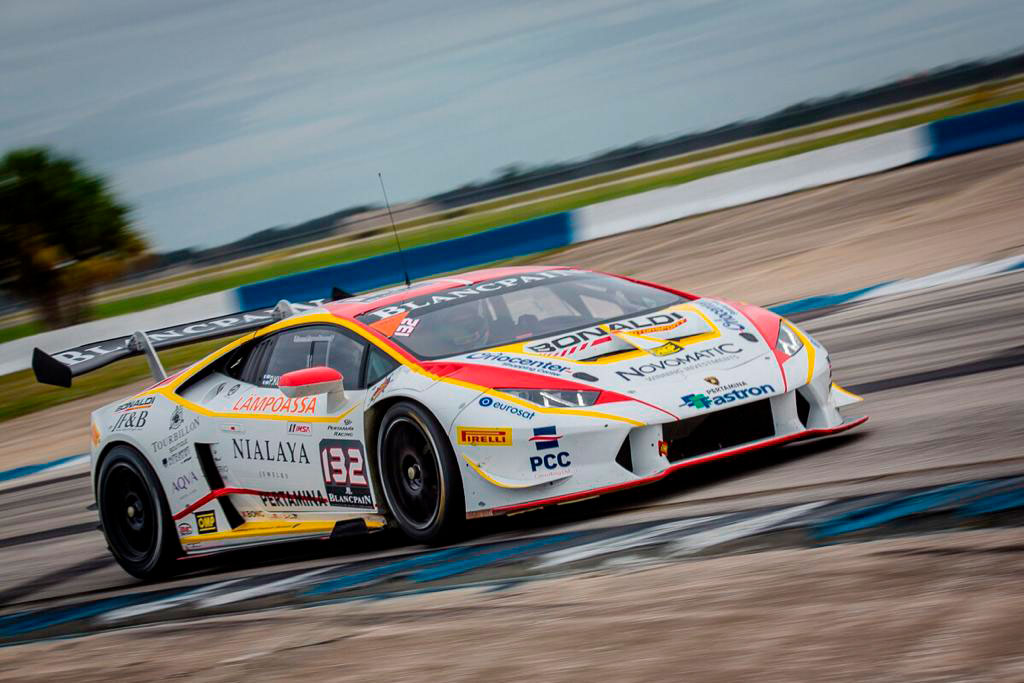
Kujala won the Lamborghini Super Trofeo Europe title in 2015 and 2016.

Kujala switched from single-seaters to GT racing in 2015, where he joined the Lamborghini Super Trofeo European Championship series with Bonaldi Motorsport. He won the title by winning eight of the ten races that year, ending with a final total of 129 points.

Kujala continued in the Lamborghini Super Trofeo European Championship series in 2016, paired with Swiss driver Adrian Amstutz. Kujala and Amstutz scored 129 points and won the PRO-AM title by five points. Furthermore, during the season Kujala competed in four rounds of Lamborghini Super Trofeo North America series and twelve rounds in the ADAC GT Masters series with a Lamborghini Huracan GT3 which was run by Bonaldi Motorsport.

=== GT3 racing ===
Kujala entered the Blancpain GT Endurance series in 2017, driving for Barwell Motorsport, teamed up with Martin Kodrić. They finished second in the Pro-Am Cup with 87 points.

That same year, Kujaia finished third in the Lamborghini Super Trofeo World finals with Richard Antinucci. He also competed in one round of the Intercontinental GT Challenge and in two rounds in British GT, again with Barwell Motorsport in a Lamborghini Huracan GT3.

In 2018, Kujala won the 24 Hours of Spa in the Am class alongside teammates Richard Abra, Adrian Amstutz and Leonid Matchinski. He also competed in eight rounds of the Lamborghini Super Trofeo European Championship and one British GT event that year.

In 2019, Kujala moved over to Porsche Carrera Cup Italy, driving for Bonaldi Motorsport. He finished third in the standings on 133 points, with two race wins. He also competed in one Intercontinental GT Challenge event, one Blancpain GT Series Endurance Cup event and two International GT Open events. He also raced in various 24 hours endurance races.

In 2020, Kujala won the Silver Cup title of the GT World Challenge Europe Endurance Cup with Barwell Motorsport alongside Alex MacDowall and Frederik Schandorff. He also finished second in that year's British GT Championship alongside Sam de Haan, driving for Ram Racing.

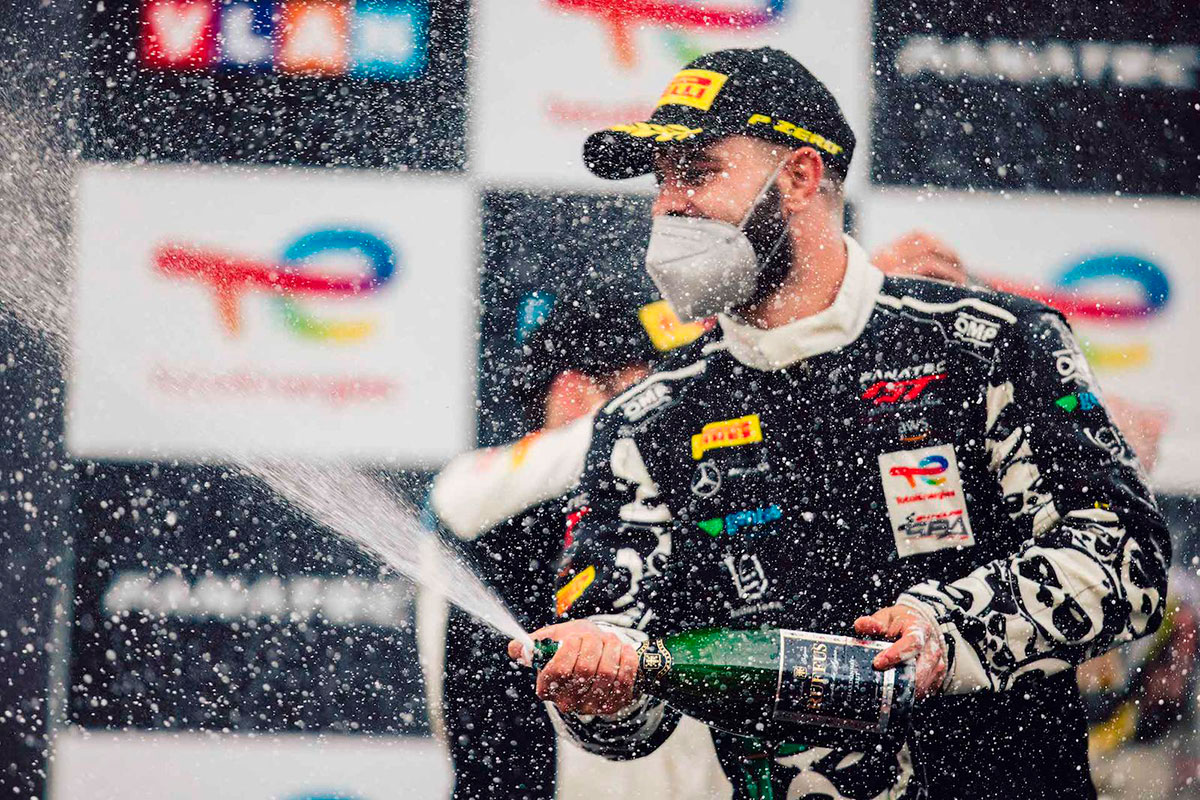
Kujala in 2021

Kujala started 2021 by winning the Asian Le Mans Series GT Am title for Rinaldi Racing alongside Christian Hook and Manuel Lauck. He won the 24 Hours of Spa in the Silver Cup for MadPanda Motorsport, alongside Ezequiel Pérez Companc, Ricardo Sanchez and Rik Breukers.

=== Racing in America ===
Kujala joined the IMSA Prototype Challenge in 2022, driving for the US RaceTronics team alongside Brian Thienes. They finished third in the standings, having started the season by finishing second at the season opener at Daytona. He also competed in Lamborghini Super Trofeo North America for O'Gara Motorsport.

== Racing record ==
=== Career summary ===
Season	Series	Team	Races	Wins	Poles	F/Laps	Podiums	Points	Position
2011	French F4 Championship	Auto Sport Academy	14	1	0	1	2	76	5th
2012	Eurocup Formula Renault 2.0	Koiranen Motorsport	14	0	0	0	0	10	23rd
2012	Formula Renault 2.0 Alps	Koiranen Motorsport	14	0	0	0	0	78	6th
2013	GP3 Series	Koiranen GP	16	0	0	0	0	5	20th
2014	GP3 Series	Marussia Manor Racing	18	0	0	0	0	22	14th
2014	GP3 Series	Trident	4	0	0	0	0	22	14th
2015	Lamborghini Super Trofeo Europe - Pro	Bonaldi Motorsport	12	9	6	4	9	144	**1st**
2015	Blancpain GT Sprint Series	Grasser Racing Team	2	0	0	0	2	21	17th
2016	Lamborghini Super Trofeo North America - Pro-Am	US RaceTronics	4	1	1	1	4	25	9th
2016	Lamborghini Super Trofeo Europe - Pro-Am	Bonaldi Motorsport	12	7	4	6	8	129	**1st**
2016	ADAC GT Masters	Bonaldi Motorsport	12	0	0	0	0	7	43rd
2016	Italian GT Championship - Super GT3	Imperiale Racing	2	0	0	0	0	14	21st
2017	Lamborghini Super Trofeo Europe	Bonaldi Motorsport	2	0	0	0	0	0	NC†
2017	British GT Championship - GT3	Barwell Motorsport	2	0	0	0	0	0	23rd
2017	Blancpain GT Series Endurance Cup	Barwell Motorsport	5	0	0	0	0	0	NC
2017	Intercontinental GT Challenge	Barwell Motorsport	1	0	0	0	0	0	NC
2017	24H Series - A6	Car Collection Motorsport							
2017	Lamborghini Super Trofeo Asia - Pro	Emperor Racing	2	0	0	0	1	12	14th
2018	Lamborghini Super Trofeo Europe - Pro	Bonaldi Motorsport	8	1	1	0	2	48	10th
2018	British GT Championship - GT3	Barwell Motorsport	2	0	0	0	0	16	14th
2018	Blancpain GT Series Endurance Cup	Barwell Motorsport	1	0	0	0	0	0	NC
2019	Porsche Carrera Cup Italia	Bonaldi Motorsport	14	2	1	3	5	133	**3rd**
2019	International GT Open	Imperiale Racing	2	0	0	0	0	9	24th
2019	Blancpain GT Series Endurance Cup	Barwell Motorsport	1	0	0	0	0	0	NC
2019	24H GT Series - A6	Attempto Racing							
2019	24H GT Series - A6	Barwell Motorsport							
2020	British GT Championship - GT3	Ram Racing	9	1	1	0	4	148.5	**2nd**
2020	GT World Challenge Europe Endurance Cup	Barwell Motorsport	4	0	0	0	0	0	NC
2020	Intercontinental GT Challenge	Barwell Motorsport	1	0	0	0	0	0	NC
2020	24H GT Series - GT3	Barwell Motorsport							
2021	Asian Le Mans Series - GT Am	Rinaldi Racing	4	3	1	2	3	77	**1st**
2021	GT World Challenge Europe Sprint Cup	Rinaldi Racing	6	0	0	0	0	7.5	25th
2021	GT World Challenge Europe Endurance Cup	Rinaldi Racing	2	0	0	0	0	1	31st
2021	GT World Challenge Europe Endurance Cup	Madpanda Motorsport	1	0	0	0	0	1	31st
2022	IMSA Prototype Challenge	US RaceTronics	5	0	0	0	2	1390	**3rd**
2022	GT World Challenge Europe Endurance Cup	Madpanda Motorsport	1	0	0	0	0	0	NC
2022	GT World Challenge Europe Endurance Cup	Barwell Motorsport	1	0	0	0	0	0	NC
2022	Lamborghini Super Trofeo North America - Pro	O'Gara Motorsport	12	1	0	0	7	111	**3rd**
2023	Le Mans Cup - GT3	Leipert Motorsport	7	1	0	2	2	72	4th
2023	GT World Challenge Europe Endurance Cup	Barwell Motorsport	1	0	0	0	0	0	NC
2023	Lamborghini Super Trofeo Europe	Target Racing							
2024	GT World Challenge Europe Endurance Cup	Barwell Motorsport	5	0	0	0	0	0	NC
2024	GT World Challenge Europe Sprint Cup	Barwell Motorsport	8	0	1	0	0	1	21st
2025	British GT Championship - GT3	Barwell Motorsport	3	0	0	0	0	31.5	15th
2026	IMSA VP Racing SportsCar Challenge - LMP3	Forte Racing	4	0	0	1	2	1160	13th

† Guest driver ineligible to score points

=== Complete Eurocup Formula Renault 2.0 results ===
(key) (Races in bold indicate pole position; races in italics indicate fastest lap)

Year	Entrant	1	2	3	4	5	6	7	8	9	10	11	12	13	14	DC	Points
2012	Koiranen Motorsport	ALC; 1; 15	ALC; 2 Ret	SPA; 1; 17	SPA; 2; 18	NÜR; 1; 19	NÜR; 2; 25	MSC; 1; 15	MSC; 2; 5	HUN; 1; 13	HUN; 2; 19	LEC; 1; 23	LEC; 2 Ret	CAT; 1 Ret	CAT; 2; 20	23rd	10

=== Complete Formula Renault 2.0 Alps Series results ===
(key) (Races in bold indicate pole position; races in italics indicate fastest lap)

Year	Team	1	2	3	4	5	6	7	8	9	10	11	12	13	14	Pos	Points
2012	Koiranen Motorsport	MNZ; 1; 17	MNZ; 2; 13	PAU; 1; 5	PAU; 2; 5	IMO; 1; 12	IMO; 2 Ret	SPA; 1; 5	SPA; 2 Ret	RBR; 1; 6	RBR; 2; 5	MUG; 1; 5	MUG; 2; 5	CAT; 1; 12	CAT; 2; 5	6th	78

=== Complete GP3 Series results ===
(key) (Races in bold indicate pole position) (Races in italics indicate fastest lap)

Year	Entrant	1	2	3	4	5	6	7	8	9	10	11	12	13	14	15	16	17	18	D.C.	Points
2013	Koiranen GP	CAT; FEA; Ret	CAT; SPR; 16	VAL; FEA; 21	VAL; SPR; 15	SIL; FEA; Ret	SIL; SPR; EX	NÜR; FEA; 13	NÜR; SPR; 13	HUN; FEA; 14	HUN; SPR; 11	SPA; FEA; 13	SPA; SPR; 20	MNZ; FEA; 10	MNZ; SPR; 12	YMC; FEA; 8	YMC; SPR; 19			20th	5
2014	Marussia Manor Racing	CAT; FEA; 4	CAT; SPR; Ret	RBR; FEA; 9	RBR; SPR; 7	SIL; FEA; 12	SIL; SPR; Ret	HOC; FEA; 25†	HOC; SPR; 16	HUN; FEA; 13	HUN; SPR; 10	SPA; FEA; Ret	SPA; SPR; 21	MNZ; FEA; 7	MNZ; SPR; Ret					14th	22
2014	Trident															SOC; FEA; 13	SOC; SPR; 9	YMC; FEA; Ret	YMC; SPR; 14	14th	22

† Driver did not finish the race, but was classified as he completed over 90% of the race distance.

=== Complete Lamborghini Super Trofeo Europe results ===
Year	Entrant	1	2	3	4	5	6	7	8	9	10	Pos.	Points
2015	Bonaldi Motorsport	ITA; 1; 1	ITA; 2; 1	GBR; 1; 1	GBR; 2; 1	FRA; 1; 24	FRA; 2; 1	BEL; 1; 1	BEL; 2; 6	GER; 1; 1	GER; 2; 1	**1st**	**129**

=== Complete GT World Challenge Europe results ===
==== GT World Challenge Europe Sprint Cup ====
Year	Team	Car	Class	1	2	3	4	5	6	7	8	9	10	11	12	13	14	Pos.	Points
2015	Grasser Racing Team	Lamborghini Huracán GT3	Pro	NOG; QR	NOG; CR	BRH; QR	BRH; CR	ZOL; QR	ZOL; CR	MOS; QR	MOS; CR	ALG; QR	ALG; CR	MIS; QR; 2	MIS; CR; 3	ZAN; QR	ZAN; CR	17th	21
2021	Rinaldi Racing	Ferrari 488 GT3 Evo 2020	Silver	MAG; 1; 8	MAG; 2; 22	ZAN; 1	ZAN; 2	MIS; 1; 11	**MIS**; **2**; 6	BRH; 1; 9	BRH; 2; 18	VAL; 1	VAL; 2					10th	37.5
2024	Barwell Motorsport	Lamborghini Huracán GT3 Evo 2	Bronze	MIS; 1; 26	MIS; 2; 28	HOC; 1; 25	HOC; 2; 23	MAG; 1; 29	MAG; 2; 24	**CAT**; **1**; 22	CAT; 2 Ret							9th	21.5

==== GT World Challenge Europe Endurance Cup ====
Year	Team	Car	Class	1	2	3	4	5	6	7	Pos.	Points
2017	Barwell Motorsport	Lamborghini Huracán GT3	Pro-Am	MNZ; 23	SIL; 20	LEC; 12	SPA; 6H; 42	SPA; 12H; 30	SPA; 24H; Ret	CAT; 16	2nd	87
2018	Barwell Motorsport	Lamborghini Huracán GT3	Am	MNZ	SIL	LEC	SPA; 6H; 32	SPA; 12H; 34	SPA; 24H; 27	CAT	11th	49
2019	Barwell Motorsport	Lamborghini Huracán GT3 Evo	Am	MNZ	SIL	LEC	SPA; 6H; 28	SPA; 12H; 31	**SPA**; **24H**; 35	CAT	11th	43
2020	Barwell Motorsport	Lamborghini Huracán GT3 Evo	Silver	IMO; 12	**NÜR**; 13	SPA; 6H; 18	SPA; 12H; 23	SPA; 24H; 36	LEC; 14		1st	108
2021	Rinaldi Racing	Ferrari 488 GT3 Evo 2020	Silver	MNZ; 17	LEC; WD				NÜR; 32	CAT	8th	55
2021	Madpanda Motorsport	Mercedes-AMG GT3 Evo	Silver			SPA; 6H; 9	SPA; 12H; 13	SPA; 24H; 11			8th	55
2022	Madpanda Motorsport	Mercedes-AMG GT3 Evo	Silver	IMO	LEC	SPA; 6H; 26	SPA; 12H; 23	SPA; 24H; 23			17th	20
2022	Barwell Motorsport	Lamborghini Huracán GT3 Evo	Silver						HOC; 29	CAT	17th	20
2023	Barwell Motorsport	Lamborghini Huracán GT3 Evo 2	Pro-Am	MNZ	LEC	SPA; 6H; 64	SPA; 12H; Ret	**SPA**; **24H**; Ret	NÜR	CAT	21st	2
2024	Barwell Motorsport	Lamborghini Huracán GT3 Evo 2	Bronze	LEC; 37	SPA; 6H; 34	SPA; 12H; 18	SPA; 24H; 14	NÜR; 39	MNZ; 37	JED; 29	15th	30

=== Complete ADAC GT Masters results ===
(key) (Races in bold indicate pole position) (Races in italics indicate fastest lap)

Year	Team	Car	1	2	3	4	5	6	7	8	9	10	11	12	13	14	Pos.	Points
2016	Bonaldi Motorsport	Lamborghini Huracán GT3	OSC; 1; 22	OSC; 2; 25	SAC; 1 Ret	SAC; 2; 17	LAU; 1; 9	LAU; 2; 8	RBR; 1 Ret	RBR; 2; 21	NÜR; 1 Ret	NÜR; 2; 19	ZAN; 1 Ret	ZAN; 2; 10	HOC; 1	HOC; 2	43rd	7

=== Complete British GT Championship results ===
(key) (Races in bold indicate pole position) (Races in italics indicate fastest lap)

Year	Team	Car	Class	1	2	3	4	5	6	7	8	9	10	Pos.	Points
2017	Barwell Motorsport	Lamborghini Huracán GT3	GT3	OUL; 1	OUL; 2	ROC; 1	SNE; 1	SNE; 2	SIL; 1	SPA; 1; 13	SPA; 2 Ret	BRH; 1	DON; 1	23rd	0
2018	Barwell Motorsport	Lamborghini Huracán GT3	GT3	OUL; 1; 5	OUL; 2; 7	ROC; 1	SNE; 1	SNE; 2	SIL; 1	SPA; 1	BRH; 1	DON; 1		14th	16
2020	Ram Racing	Mercedes-AMG GT3 Evo	GT3	OUL; 1; 5	OUL; 2; 3	DON; 1; 2	DON; 2; 8	BRH; 1; 4	DON; 1; 1	**SNE**; **1**; 5	SNE; 2; 3	SIL; 1; 8		2nd	148.5
2025	Barwell Motorsport	Lamborghini Huracán GT3 Evo 2	GT3	DON; 1	SIL; 1; 7	OUL; 1	OUL; 2	SPA; 1; 4	SNE; 1	SNE; 2	BRH; 1; 10	DON; 1		15th	31.5

Sporting positions
Preceded by Melville McKee	Formula Renault 2.0 Alps; Junior Champion; 2012	Succeeded by Antonio Fuoco
Preceded by Nico Bastian; Timur Boguslavskiy; Felipe Fraga (Blancpain GT Series Endurance Cup)	GT World Challenge Europe Endurance Cup; Silver Cup Champion; 2020; With: Alex MacDowall & Frederik Schandorff	Succeeded by Incumbent
