= Armaan Ebrahim =

Indian car racer (born 1989)

- Nationality: Indian
- Born: 17 May 1989 (age 37) Madras, Tamil Nadu, India

Blancpain Sprint Series season career
- Debut season: 2009
- Current team: Fortec Motorsport
- Categorisation: FIA Silver
- Car number: 6
- Former teams: A1 Team India, David Price Racing, MotorSport Vision, Fan Force United, BMW Auto Service Team India
- Starts: 41
- Wins: 0
- Poles: 0
- Fastest laps: 0
- Best finish: 10th in 2010

Previous series
- 2005 2005 2005-07 2006 2007–08 2008 2009, 2010 & 2011 2012: Formula BMW Asia; Formula BMW World Final; A1 Grand Prix; Formula Renault UK; Formula V6 Asia; GP2 Asia Series FIA Formula Two Championship; Firestone Indy Lights

Armaan Ebrahim (born 17 May 1989) is an Indian car racer from Chennai. He is the vice-president of MECO Motorsports.

== Background and personal life ==
Ebrahim was born in an Indian Muslim family, the son of Akbar Ebrahim, a former F3 champion. The family is based in Chennai, Tamil Nadu.

In December 2021, Ebrahim married Anushpala Kamineni, daughter of Anil and Shobana Kamineni. Anil Kamineni is a Hyderabad-based businessman and Shobana is the daughter of Prathap Reddy, the founder of Apollo Hospitals.

Anushpala has one sister, Upasana, who is married to Telugu film star Ram Charan, himself the son of superstar Chiranjeevi.

== Career ==
Ebrahim started his career in karting and became Formula LGB Champion in 2004. He later moved to Formula BMW Asia for the 2005 season. During the same year, he represented A1 Team India in the A1 Grand Prix Championship, driving in six races, before the team was disbanded due to lack of funds. He again drove for A1 Team India for the 2006–07 A1 Grand Prix season, once again on a partial schedule. In 2007, he also drove in Formula V6 Asia, where he captured five race wins and finished second in points.

Ebrahim drove for the David Price Racing team in the 2008 GP2 Asia Series where he finished 26th in points with a best finish of ninth position.

On 12 December 2008, Ebrahim was announced as the first (and ultimately, only) Asian driver to sign up for the rebirth of FIA Formula Two in 2009, driving car number six. He finished seventeenth in points, with two sixth place finishes at Brno being his best results. The Formula Two website rated Ebrahim as the "Driver with the Best Race Form". On an average, he overtook eight cars per race in Formula 2. The second best driver was Edoardo Piscopo who managed an average of five. Ebrahim returned to FIA Formula Two in 2010 driving for MotorSport Vision. He captured his first F2 podium finish at Circuit de Valencia and improved to tenth in points. He returned to the series and team in 2011, but left the series after twelve of the sixteen races. He had a best finish of sixth and finished 15th in points.

In 2012, Ebrahim signed to race in the American Firestone Indy Lights series for the new Fan Force United team owned by former IndyCar Series driver Tyce Carlson. Ebrahim and the team mutually parted ways after five races. He had a best finish of eighth in the season opener and ultimately wound up 13th in the championship.

Ebrahim is popular in the Indian media and featured on a special programme on national television with former F1 superstar David Coulthard, during the latter's visit to India in October 2009.

Ebrahim has competed for BMW Auto Service Team India in the FIA GT Series, which began on 1 April 2013.

Ebrahim competed in 2014 Blancpain Sprint Series season with Team Fortec Motorsport where he secured seven podiums in the Silver Cup.

Ebrahim has competed in the Lamborghini Super Trofeo Asia series. In his first season of Lamborghini Super Trofeo Asia series in 2015, he raced with Dilantha Malagamuwa for Dilango Racing

In the 2016 season of Lamborghini Super Trofeo Asia Series, Ebrahim raced for team Dilango Racing with Dilantha Malagamuva. He won in the Pro-Am Class championship and finished fourth overall. In 2017, Ebrahim stepped up to the Pro class with FFF Racing Team, partnering British racing driver Jack Bartholomew. For the 2018 season, he competed with team Team Top Speed partnering with rookie Anindith Reddy. The duo managed to take a second place finish in their very first outing at Sepang.

== X1 Racing ==
In 2019, with fellow Indian driver, Aditya Patel, Ebrahim created the X1 Racing League, the world's first professional franchise-based motorsport league.

== Racing record ==
=== Career summary ===
Season	Series	Team	Races	Wins	Poles	F/Laps	Podiums	Points	Position
2005	Formula BMW Asia	Team E-Rain	14	1	1	1	4	129	5th
2005	Formula BMW World Final	Team E-Rain	1	0	0	0	0	N/A	NC
2005-06	A1 Grand Prix	A1 Team India	11	0	0	0	0	0	23rd
2006	Formula Renault 2.0 UK	Position 1 Racing	19	0	0	0	0	54	24th
2006-07	A1 Grand Prix	A1 Team India	10	0	0	0	0	13	16th
2007	Formula Renault V6 Asia	Team TARADTM	12	5	0	2	8	116	**2nd**
2008	Formula V6 Asia	Black Tara	6	2	0	4	1	59	7th
2008	GP2 Asia	David Price Racing	10	0	0	0	0	0	26th
2009	FIA Formula Two Championship	MotorSport Vision	15	0	0	0	0	7	17th
2009	German Formula Three Championship	Van Amersfoort Racing	2	0	0	0	0	0	NC†
2010	FIA Formula Two Championship	MotorSport Vision	18	0	0	0	1	78	10th
2011	FIA Formula Two Championship	MotorSport Vision	12	0	0	0	0	16	15th
2012	Indy Lights	Fan Force United	5	0	0	0	0	97	13th
2013	FIA GT Series - Pro-Am	BMW Sports Trophy Team India	6	0	0	0	2	28	14th
2016	Lamborghini Super Trofeo Asia - Pro-Am	Dilango Racing							
2017	Lamborghini Super Trofeo Asia - Pro	FFF Racing Team	8	0	0	0	2	54	6th
2017	Lamborghini Super Trofeo Asia - Pro-Am	FFF Racing Team	2	0	0	0	2	22	7th
2018	Lamborghini Super Trofeo Asia - Pro	Top Speed Racing Team	4	0	0	0	2	36	6th
2018	Lamborghini Super Trofeo Asia - Pro	Top Speed Racing Team	2	0	0	1	2	24	7th

† As Ebrahim was a guest driver, he was ineligible to score points

=== Complete A1 Grand Prix results ===
(key) (Races in bold indicate pole position) (Races in italics indicate fastest lap)

Year	Entrant	1	2	3	4	5	6	7	8	9	10	11	12	13	14	15	16	17	18	19	20	21	22	DC	Points	Ref
2005–06	India	GBR; SPR	GBR; FEA	GER; SPR	GER; FEA	POR; SPR; 17	POR; FEA; 13	AUS; SPR; 17	AUS; FEA; 13	MYS; SPR; 11	MYS; FEA; EX	UAE; SPR; 20	UAE; FEA; 14	RSA; SPR; 14	RSA; FEA; Ret	IDN; SPR; 18	IDN; FEA; 15	MEX; SPR	MEX; FEA	USA; SPR	USA; FEA	CHN; SPR	CHN; FEA	**24th**	**0**	
2006–07	India	NED; SPR; Ret	NED; FEA; Ret	CZE; SPR; 17	CZE; FEA; 18	CHN; SPR; 18	CHN; FEA; 11	MYS; SPR; 16	MYS; FEA; 19	IDN; SPR; 18	IDN; FEA; Ret	NZL; SPR	NZL; FEA	AUS; SPR	AUS; FEA	RSA; SPR	RSA; FEA	MEX; SPR	MEX; FEA	CHN; SPR	CHN; FEA	GBR; SPR	GBR; SPR	**16th**	**13**	

=== Complete GP2 Asia Series results ===
(key) (Races in bold indicate pole position) (Races in italics indicate fastest lap)

Year	Entrant	1	2	3	4	5	6	7	8	9	10	DC	Points
2008	David Price Racing	UAE; FEA; 21	UAE; SPR; Ret	IND; FEA; Ret	IND; SPR; 9	MAL; FEA; Ret	MAL; SPR; 19	BHR; FEA; 13	BHR; SPR; 16	UAE; FEA; 19	UAE; SPR; Ret	26th	0

=== Complete FIA Formula Two Championship results ===
(key) (Races in bold indicate pole position) (Races in italics indicate fastest lap)

Year	1	2	3	4	5	6	7	8	9	10	11	12	13	14	15	16	17	18	Pos	Points
2009	VAL; 1; 15	VAL; 2; 16	BRN; 1; 6	BRN; 2; 6	SPA; 1 DNS	SPA; 2 Ret	BRH; 1 Ret	BRH; 2; 10	DON; 1; 8	DON; 2 Ret	OSC; 1; 9	OSC; 2; 13	IMO; 1 Ret	IMO; 2 Ret	CAT; 1; 12	CAT; 2; 10			17th	7
2010	SIL; 1; 8	SIL; 2; 9	MAR; 1; 6	MAR; 2; 6	MNZ; 1 Ret	MNZ; 2; 5	ZOL; 1; 5	ZOL; 2 Ret	ALG; 1; 7	ALG; 2 Ret	BRH; 1; 9	BRH; 2; 7	BRN; 1 Ret	BRN; 2; 13	OSC; 1; 11	OSC; 2; 10	VAL; 1; 3	VAL; 1; 7	10th	78
2011	SIL; 1; 11	SIL; 2; 7	MAG; 1; 12	MAG; 2 Ret	SPA; 1; 13	SPA; 2; 20	NÜR; 1; 15	NÜR; 2; 13	BRH; 1; 9	BRH; 2; 6	RBR; 1; 14	RBR; 2 Ret	MNZ; 1	MNZ; 2	CAT; 1	CAT; 2			15th	16

=== American open–wheel racing results ===
(key)

==== Indy Lights ====
Year	Team	1	2	3	4	5	6	7	8	9	10	11	12	Rank	Points	Ref
2012	Fan Force United	STP; 8	ALA; 12	LBH; 12	INDY; 13	DET; 10	MIL	IOW	TOR	EDM	TRO	BAL	FON	**13th**	**97**	
