= 2016 Lamborghini Super Trofeo =

Seasons
- ← 2015 2017 →

The 2016 Lamborghini Super Trofeo season was the eighth season of the European Super Trofeo, the fourth season of the North American Super Trofeo and the fifth season of the Asian Super Trofeo. Every championship features six double-header rounds, with each race lasting for a duration of 50 minutes. 2016 marks the 2nd season of the Huracán LP620-2 Super Trofeo.

== Super Trofeo Europe ==
=== Calendar ===
Rnd.	Circuit	Date
1	(Italy) Autodromo Nazionale Monza	22–24 April
2	(United Kingdom) Silverstone Circuit	13–15 May
3	(France) Circuit Paul Ricard	24–26 June
4	(Belgium) Circuit de Spa-Francorchamps	29–31 July
5	(Germany) Nürburgring	16–18 September
6	(Spain) Circuit Ricardo Tormo	1-4 December

=== Results summary ===
Round	Circuit	Date	Pole position	Fastest lap	Winning drivers
1	(Italy) Autodromo Nazionale Monza	24 April	(United Kingdom) Steve Tandy	(Netherlands) Paul van Splunteren	(Netherlands) Rik Breukers
2	(Italy) Autodromo Nazionale Monza	24 April	(United Kingdom) Steve Tandy	(Netherlands) Rik Breukers	(Italy) Raffaele Giannoni
3	(United Kingdom) Silverstone Circuit	15 May	(Netherlands) Rik Breukers	(Netherlands) Rik Breukers	(Netherlands) Rik Breukers
4	(United Kingdom) Silverstone Circuit	15 May	(United Kingdom) Steve Tandy	(Netherlands) Rik Breukers	(Netherlands) Rik Breukers
5	(France) Circuit Paul Ricard	26 June	(Switzerland) Philipp Schlegel	(Nigeria) Shahin Nouri	(Switzerland) Philipp Schlegel
6	(France) Circuit Paul Ricard	26 June	(Italy) Matteo Desideri	(Russia) Mikhail Spiridonov	(Italy) Matteo Desideri
7	(Belgium) Circuit de Spa-Francorchamps	31 July	(Nigeria) Shahin Nouri	(Nigeria) Shahin Nouri	(Nigeria) Shahin Nouri
8	(Belgium) Circuit de Spa-Francorchamps	31 July	(United Kingdom) Steve Tandy	(Netherlands) Rik Breukers	(Italy) Raffaele Giannoni
9	(Germany) Nürburgring	17 September	(Israel) Amir Krenzia	(Nigeria) Shahin Nouri	(Nigeria) Shahin Nouri
10	(Germany) Nürburgring	18 September	(Israel) Amir Krenzia	(Nigeria) Shahin Nouri	(Nigeria) Shahin Nouri
11	(Spain) Circuit Ricardo Tormo	4 December	(Poland) Teodor Myszkowski	(Italy) Kikko Galbiati	(Italy) Kikko Galbiati
12	(Spain) Circuit Ricardo Tormo	4 December	(Italy) Kikko Galbiati	(Australia) Ben Gersekowski	(Nigeria) Shahin Nouri

== Super Trofeo North America ==
=== Calendar ===
Rnd.	Circuit	Date
1	(United States) Mazda Raceway Laguna Seca	29–1 May
2	(United States) Watkins Glen	30–2 July
3	(United States) Road America	5–7 August
4	(United States) Virginia International Raceway	26–28 August
5	(United States) Circuit of the Americas	14–16 September
6	(Spain) Circuit Ricardo Tormo	1-4 December

=== Results summary ===
Round	Circuit	Date	Pole position	Fastest lap	Winning drivers
1	(United States) Mazda Raceway Laguna Seca				
2	(United States) Mazda Raceway Laguna Seca	1 May			
3	(United States) Watkins Glen				
4	(United States) Watkins Glen	2 July			
5	(United States) Road America				
6	(United States) Road America	7 August			
7	(United States) Virginia International Raceway				
8	(United States) Virginia International Raceway	28 August			
9	(United States) Circuit of the Americas				
10	(United States) Circuit of the Americas	16 September			
11	(Spain) Circuit Ricardo Tormo				
12	(Spain) Circuit Ricardo Tormo	4 December			

== Super Trofeo Asia ==
=== Calendar ===
Rnd.	Circuit	Date
1	Shanghai International Circuit, Shanghai, China	20–22 May
2	Suzuka Circuit, Suzuka, Japan	11–12 June
3	Chang International Circuit, Buriram, Thailand	22–24 July
4	Sepang International Circuit, Selangor, Malaysia	12–14 August
5	Fuji Speedway, Oyama, Japan	16–18 September
6	Circuit Ricardo Tormo, Valencia, Spain	1-4 December

=== Entries ===
Team	No.	Drivers	Class	Rounds
	2	(Chinese Taipei) Han Lin	LC	5
	2	(Chinese Taipei) Jeremy Wang	LC	5
	7	(China) Xu Jia		1
	7	(China) Xu Wei		1
	8	(China) Wang Liang		1
	8	(China) Yang Yuan		1
(Japan) Bingo Racing	9	(China) Li Lin		1
(Japan) Bingo Racing	9	(China) Hu Nan		4
(Japan) Bingo Racing	9	(China) He Xiao Le		4
(Japan) Bingo Racing	9	(Thailand) Maekkasit Weraporasu		3
(Japan) Bingo Racing	9	(Japan) Tsuyoshi Tajima	Am	5
(Japan) Bingo Racing	9	(Japan) Shinji Takei	Am	5
(Japan) Lamborghini Osaka Racing Team	12	(Japan) Toshiyuki Ochiai	P	1–5
(Japan) Lamborghini Osaka Racing Team	12	(Malaysia) Afiq Yazid	P	1–5
(Japan) Lamborghini Osaka Racing Team	21	(Japan) Eiji Yamada		5
	13	(Japan) Hironori Takeuchi	PA	2
(Hong Kong) StarSpeed Racing	15	(Hong Kong) Chun Hua Chen	Am	3, 5
(Hong Kong) StarSpeed Racing	15	(Hong Kong) Mark Chung	Am	3, 5
(Hong Kong) StarSpeed Racing	25	(China) Hu Nan		1
(Hong Kong) StarSpeed Racing	36	(Hong Kong) Sam Lok	LC	1, 4
(Indonesia) Team Lunacea by Tedco Racing	18	(Indonesia) Andrew Haryanto	Am	1–5
(Indonesia) Team Lunacea by Tedco Racing	18	(Malaysia) Mark Darwin Partap Singh	Am	1
(Japan) Direction Racing	23	(Japan) Yūdai Uchida	P	1–5
(Japan) Direction Racing	23	(New Zealand) Jono Lester	P	1–5
(Sri Lanka) Dilango Racing	24	(India) Armaan Ebrahim	PA	1–5
(Sri Lanka) Dilango Racing	24	(Sri Lanka) Dilantha Malagamuwa	PA	1–5
	27	(Switzerland) James Fischer	LC	5
	36	(Japan) Akira Mizutani	PA	2
	36	(Japan) Hajime Noma	PA	2
	37	(Italy) Davide Rizzo		1
	38	(Australia) Jake Parsons	P	5
	38	(Australia) Aidan Wright	P	5
	52	(Japan) Akira Mizutani	PA	5
	52	(Japan) Hironori Takeuchi	PA	5
(San Marino) GDL Racing	58	(Chinese Taipei) Jiuyu Chien		1
(San Marino) GDL Racing	58	(Chinese Taipei) En Tai Wei		1
(San Marino) GDL Racing	58	(United States) Larry DeGeorge	PA	2
(San Marino) GDL Racing	58	(Monaco) Cédric Sbirrazzuoli	PA	2
(San Marino) GDL Racing	58	(Singapore) Keong Wee Lim		4
	63	(Japan) Yuichi Ijima	LC	5
	66	(China) S. Lin		1
(Malaysia) Aylezo Racing	69	(Malaysia) Zen Low	PA	1–5
(Malaysia) Aylezo Racing	69	(Italy) Massimiliano Wiser	PA	1–5
(Thailand) Siamgas Corse	71	(Thailand) Supachai Weeraborwornpong	LC	1–5
(Japan) CarGuy Racing	77	(Japan) Takeshi Kimura		2, 5
(Japan) CarGuy Racing	77	(Japan) Yusuke Hayashi		5
(Hong Kong) Top Speed Racing Team	88	(Chinese Taipei) George Chou	Am	1–5
(Hong Kong) Top Speed Racing Team	88	(Hong Kong) Samson Chan	Am	1–5
(Hong Kong) Top Speed Racing Team	99	(Hong Kong) Vincent Wong	Am	1–5
(Hong Kong) Top Speed Racing Team	99	(South Korea) Sanghwi Yoon	Am	2–5
	90	(China) Lin Yu		1
	90	(China) Zhang Wen He		1
	96	(China) Li Chao	PA	1–2, 5
	96	(China) Zhang Dasheng	PA	1–2, 5

Icon	Class
P	Pro Cup
PA	Pro-Am Cup
Am	Am Cup
LC	Lamborghini Cup
	Guest Starter

=== Results summary ===
Round		Circuit	Pole Position	Pro Winners	Pro-Am Winners	Am Winners	LC Winners
1	R1	(China) Shanghai	(Japan) No. 23 Direction Racing	(Japan) No. 12 Lamborghini Osaka Racing Team	No. 96	(Hong Kong) No. 99 Top Speed Racing Team	
1	R1	(China) Shanghai	(Japan) Yūdai Uchida (New Zealand) Jono Lester	(Japan) Toshiyuki Ochiai (Malaysia) Afiq Yazid	(China) Li Chao (China) Zhang Dasheng	(Hong Kong) Vincent Wong	
1	R2	(China) Shanghai	(Japan) No. 12 Lamborghini Osaka Racing Team	(Japan) No. 12 Lamborghini Osaka Racing Team	No. 96	(Hong Kong) No. 99 Top Speed Racing Team	
1	R2	(China) Shanghai	(Japan) Toshiyuki Ochiai (Malaysia) Afiq Yazid	(Japan) Toshiyuki Ochiai (Malaysia) Afiq Yazid	(China) Li Chao (China) Zhang Dasheng	(Hong Kong) Vincent Wong	
2	R1	(Japan) Suzuka	(Japan) No. 12 Lamborghini Osaka Racing Team	(Japan) No. 23 Direction Racing	(Sri Lanka) No. 24 Dilango Racing	No. 77	
2	R1	(Japan) Suzuka	(Japan) Toshiyuki Ochiai (Malaysia) Afiq Yazid	(Japan) Yūdai Uchida (New Zealand) Jono Lester	(India) Armaan Ebrahim (Sri Lanka) Dilantha Malagamuwa	(Japan) Takeshi Kimura	
2	R2	(Japan) Suzuka	(Japan) No. 23 Direction Racing	(Japan) No. 12 Lamborghini Osaka Racing Team	(Malaysia) No. 69 Ayelzo Racing	(Indonesia) No. 18 Team Lunacea by Tedco Racing	
2	R2	(Japan) Suzuka	(Japan) Yūdai Uchida (New Zealand) Jono Lester	(Japan) Toshiyuki Ochiai (Malaysia) Afiq Yazid	(Malaysia) Zen Low (Italy) Massimiliano Wiser	(Indonesia) Andrew Haryanto	
3	R1	(Thailand) Buriram	(Japan) No. 23 Direction Racing	(Japan) No. 12 Lamborghini Osaka Racing Team	(Sri Lanka) No. 24 Dilango Racing	(Indonesia) No. 18 Team Lunacea by Tedco Racing	
3	R1	(Thailand) Buriram	(Japan) Yūdai Uchida (New Zealand) Jono Lester	(Japan) Toshiyuki Ochiai (Malaysia) Afiq Yazid	(India) Armaan Ebrahim (Sri Lanka) Dilantha Malagamuwa	(Indonesia) Andrew Haryanto	
3	R2	(Thailand) Buriram	(Malaysia) No. 69 Aylezo Racing	(Japan) No. 12 Lamborghini Osaka Racing Team	(Sri Lanka) No. 24 Dilango Racing	(Indonesia) No. 18 Team Lunacea by Tedco Racing	
3	R2	(Thailand) Buriram	(Malaysia) Zen Low (Italy) Massimiliano Wiser	(Japan) Toshiyuki Ochiai (Malaysia) Afiq Yazid	(India) Armaan Ebrahim (Sri Lanka) Dilantha Malagamuwa	(Indonesia) Andrew Haryanto	
4	R1	(Malaysia) Sepang	(Sri Lanka) No. 24 Dilango Racing	(Japan) No. 12 Lamborghini Osaka Racing Team	(Sri Lanka) No. 24 Dilango Racing	(Indonesia) No. 18 Team Lunacea by Tedco Racing	(Thailand) No. 71 Siamgas Corse
4	R1	(Malaysia) Sepang	(India) Armaan Ebrahim (Sri Lanka) Dilantha Malagamuwa	(Japan) Toshiyuki Ochiai (Malaysia) Afiq Yazid	(India) Armaan Ebrahim (Sri Lanka) Dilantha Malagamuwa	(Indonesia) Andrew Haryanto	(Thailand) Supachai Weeraborwornpong
4	R2	(Malaysia) Sepang	(Japan) No. 12 Lamborghini Osaka Racing Team	(Japan) No. 12 Lamborghini Osaka Racing Team	(Sri Lanka) No. 24 Dilango Racing	(Hong Kong) No. 99 Top Speed Racing Team	(Hong Kong) No. 36 StarSpeed Racing
4	R2	(Malaysia) Sepang	(Japan) Toshiyuki Ochiai (Malaysia) Afiq Yazid	(Japan) Toshiyuki Ochiai (Malaysia) Afiq Yazid	(India) Armaan Ebrahim (Sri Lanka) Dilantha Malagamuwa	(Hong Kong) Vincent Wong (South Korea) Sanghwi Yoon	(Hong Kong) Sam Lok
5	R1	(Japan) Fuji	(Japan) No. 23 Direction Racing	(Japan) No. 12 Lamborghini Osaka Racing Team	(Sri Lanka) No. 24 Dilango Racing	(Japan) No. 77 Direction Racing	(Thailand) No. 71 Siamgas Corse
5	R1	(Japan) Fuji	(Japan) Yūdai Uchida (New Zealand) Jono Lester	(Japan) Toshiyuki Ochiai (Malaysia) Afiq Yazid	(India) Armaan Ebrahim (Sri Lanka) Dilantha Malagamuwa	(Japan) Takeshi Kimura (Japan) Yusuke Hayashi	(Thailand) Supachai Weeraborwornpong
5	R2	(Japan) Fuji	No. 52	(Japan) No. 12 Lamborghini Osaka Racing Team	(Sri Lanka) No. 24 Dilango Racing	(Indonesia) No. 18 Team Lunacea by Tedco Racing	(Thailand) No. 71 Siamgas Corse
5	R2	(Japan) Fuji	(Japan) Hironori Takeuchi (Japan) Akira Mizutani	(Japan) Toshiyuki Ochiai (Malaysia) Afiq Yazid	(India) Armaan Ebrahim (Sri Lanka) Dilantha Malagamuwa	(Indonesia) Andrew Haryanto	(Thailand) Supachai Weeraborwornpong
6	R1	(Spain) Valencia					
6	R2	(Spain) Valencia					

=== Championship standings ===
==== Pro ====
Pos.	Driver	Team	(China) SHA		(Japan) SUZ		(Thailand) CHA		(Malaysia) SEP		(Japan) FUJ		(Spain) VAL		Pts
Pos.	Driver	Team	R1	R2	R1	R2	R1	R2	R1	R2	R1	R2	R1	R2	Pts
1	(Japan) Toshiyuki Ochiai (Malaysia) Afiq Yazid	(Japan) Lamborghini Osaka													144
2	(Japan) Yūdai Uchida (New Zealand) Jono Lester	(Japan) Promotion Racing													117
3	(China) Li Chao (China) Zhang Dasheng														47
4	(Japan) Eiji Yamada														22
5	(Australia) Aidan Wright														16
Pos.	Driver	Team	R1	R2	R1	R2	R1	R2	R1	R2	R1	R2	R1	R2	Pts
Pos.	Driver	Team	(China) SHA		(Japan) SUZ		(Thailand) CHA		(Malaysia) SEP		(Japan) FUJ		(Spain) VAL		Pts

==== Pro-Am ====
Pos.	Driver	Team	(China) SHA		(Japan) SUZ		(Thailand) CHA		(Malaysia) SEP		(Japan) FUJ		(Spain) VAL		Pts
Pos.	Driver	Team	R1	R2	R1	R2	R1	R2	R1	R2	R1	R2	R1	R2	Pts
1	(India) Armaan Ebrahim (Sri Lanka) Dilantha Malagamuwa	(Sri Lanka) Dilango Racing													135
2	(Malaysia) Zen Low (Italy) Massimiliano Wiser														119
3	(United States) Larry DeGeorge (Monaco) Cédric Sbirrazzuoli														24
4	(Japan) Akira Mizutani (Japan) Hajime Noma														18
5	(Japan) Hironori Takeuchi														12
6	(China) Nan Hu (China) He Xiao Le														10
Pos.	Driver	Team	R1	R2	R1	R2	R1	R2	R1	R2	R1	R2	R1	R2	Pts
Pos.	Driver	Team	(China) SHA		(Japan) SUZ		(Thailand) CHA		(Malaysia) SEP		(Japan) FUJ		(Spain) VAL		Pts
