= James Grunwell =

British racing driver (born 1989)

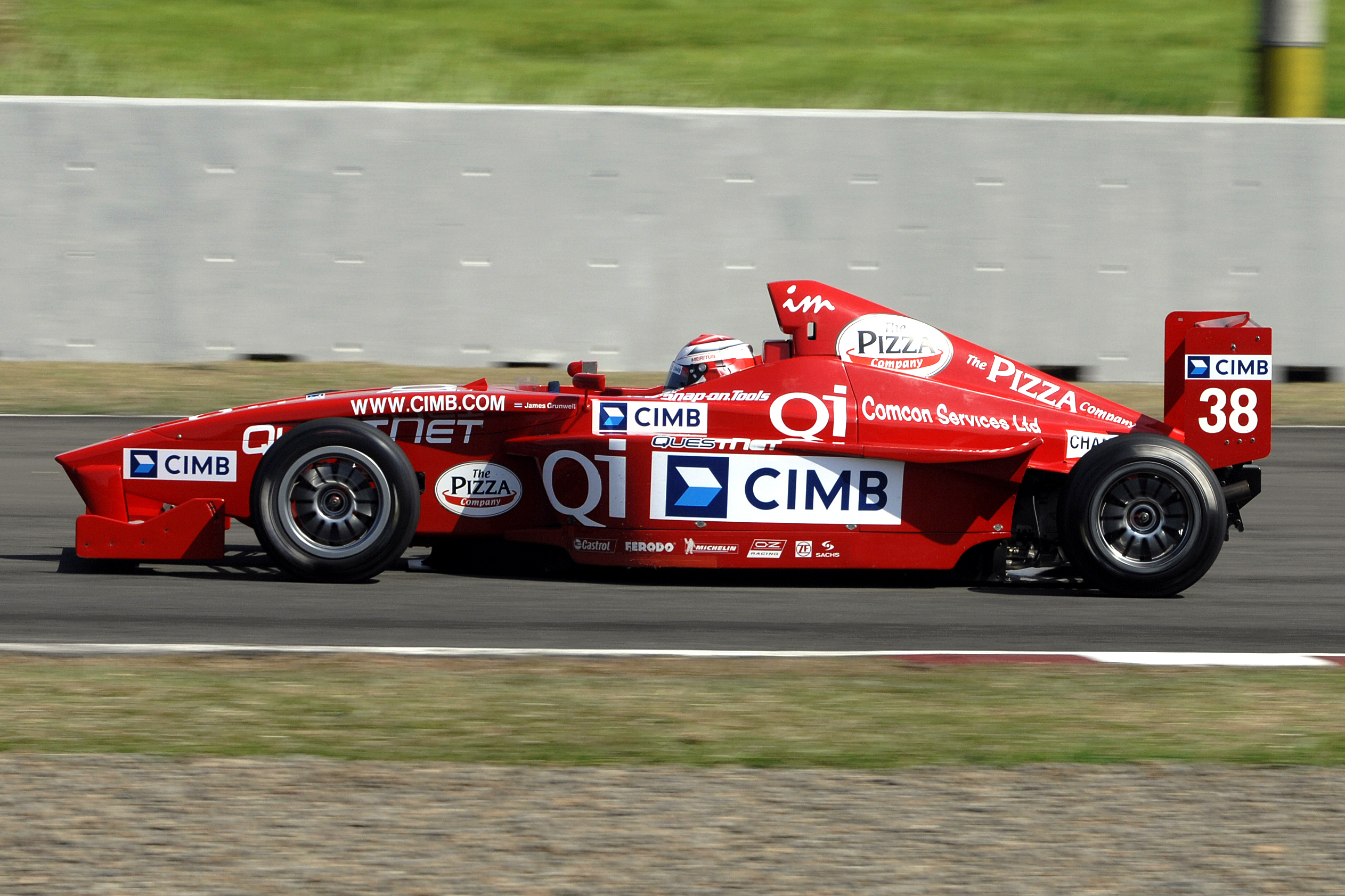

James Dominic Grunwell (born 4 February 1989) is a British racing driver, who has lived most of his life in Thailand.

== 2003 ==
In early 2003, Grunwell entered his first official race where the Champion Racing Team was formed under the support of Champion Ferodo.

At the age of 14, Grunwell entered The Thailand Under 18 100cc Veloil Challenge and won its championship. He then later entered the Thailand Nationals in the Yamaha class and won two out of four races with podiums in the other two. He continued to enter kart races with the 2003 kart, and still managed to finish the season fourth in the internationally recognized Intercon ‘A’ Class. Grunwell finished on the podium in every race he entered.

== 2004 ==
Towards the end of 2004, Grunwell had an opportunity of a test drive with AIM Racing, one of Thailand’s leading racing teams. He passed with flying colors as the fastest rookie ever to take the test. He was immediately entered for the last two races of 2004 as a guest driver. He drove a specially designed Thai built car that ran with 12 valve, 1600cc, Toyota racing engines that produces top speeds of up to 160 km/h. He competed in four out of six races in the new season, finishing first twice and had a podium place in the rest.

In December 2004, Grunwell was invited for a test drive in a Formula BMW, with the Meritus Racing Team in Malaysia. Again, he passed the test and was offered a drive with them in 2005. He entered the Formula BMW scholarship programme and missed out by one place for the scholarship. Grunwell and his sponsors decided to concentrate on karting in Thailand.

== 2004–2006 ==
Grunwell won all the races in Thailand Rotax Max Junior series. He later entered the World Finals in Langkawi for Rotax Max. In Langkawi, Grunwell finished in the top-five in all races and started fourth on the grid in the final. He was the highest placed Thai driver ever.

At the end of 2005, Grunwell again joined the Formula BMW Asia scholarship program and this time – having matured a little and with some more experience – passed with flying colors. He won one of four prestigious BMW Scholarship prizes worth USD 50,000 and managed to get bonus points for setting the fastest lap out of 20 competitors.

In 2006, Meritus Racing Team took Grunwell on as a Rookie driver to compete in the Formula BMW Asia series, where he finished third in the Rookie Championship and 4th overall.

== 2007–2008 ==
In 2007, Grunwell spent a second year in Formula BMW Asia for Meritus Racing Team. He finished third in points with three wins among 12 podium finishes. In 2008, Grunwell raced in Formula V6 Asia for Team Meritus and won the championship, capturing four wins and finishing on the podium in all but two of the twelve races. However, despite the 2008 success, Grunwell has not appeared in a professional motor race since that time.

== Advertising and sponsorship ==
All through 2005 and 2006, Grunwell has been featured in many magazines and newspapers. James also appeared with his Concept Car at the Bangkok 7th Rugby Tournament on behalf of his sponsors Champion Ferodo, where he did a demonstration drive by and helped present the prize to the winners of the tournament.

In 2007, The Pizza Company became one of the main sponsors for Grunwell in the Formula BMW Asia Series followed by Comcon Services Thailand and Image Makers Asia, and Grunwell has been actively promoting both companies in Thailand and abroad.

Grunwell is based in Thailand and is currently racing throughout Asia where he currently leads the Formula BMW Asian Championship after winning races in Malaysia and Indonesia.

== Sources ==
- ,*
- Boudreau, Mark , F1 Prospect, January 28, 2006, Accessed July 31,

Sporting positions
Preceded by James Winslow	Formula V6 Asia champion 2008	Succeeded by Hamad Al Fardan
