= Dilango Racing =

Sri Lankan auto racing team

(Sri Lanka) Dilango Racing
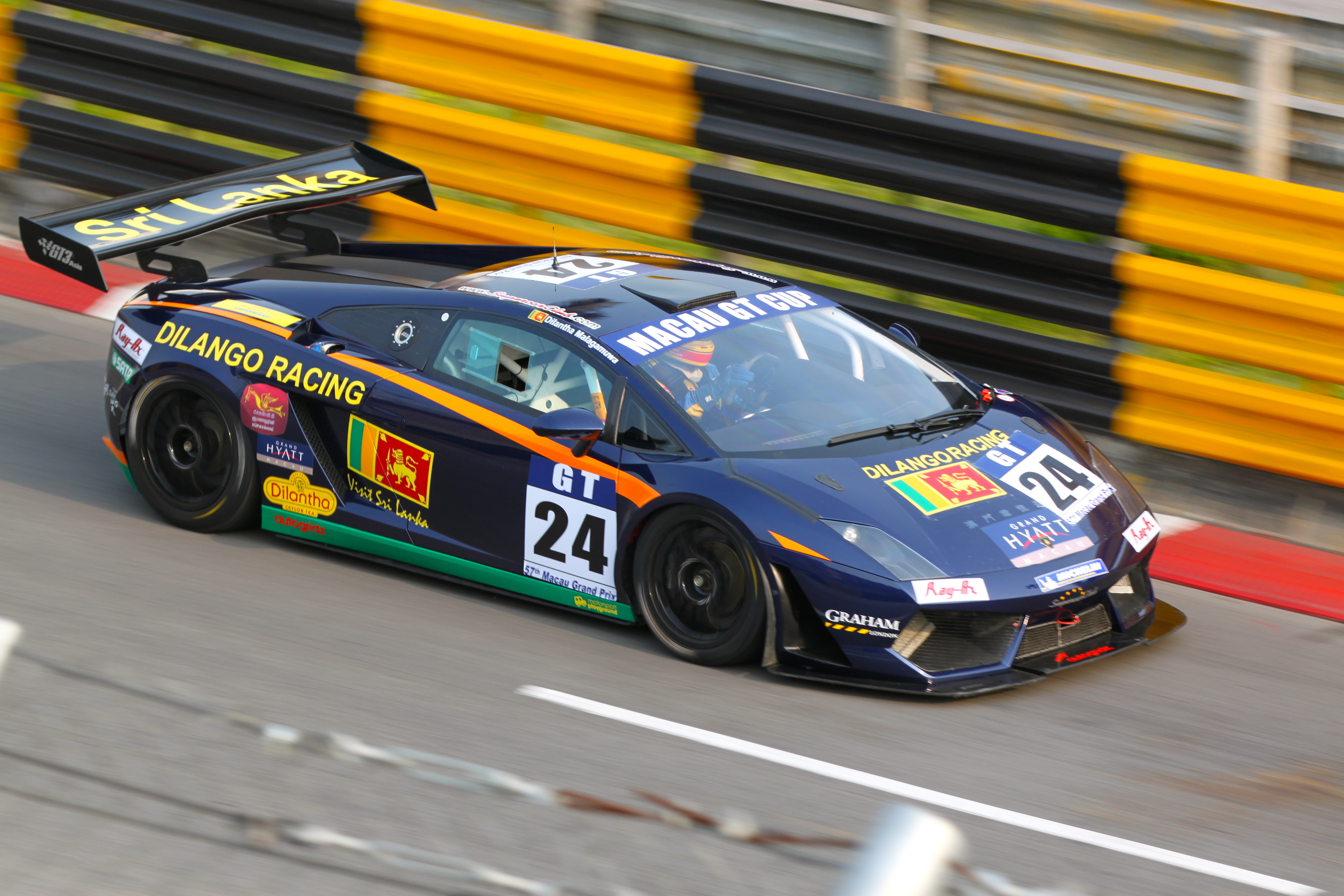
- Founder(s): Dilantha Malagamuwa
- Base: Sri Lanka
- Current series: Lamborghini Super Trofeo Asia 2016, GT Asia Series]] 2016
- Former series: Lamborghini Super Trofeo Asia 2015,2014, GT Asia Series 2015,2014,2013,2012,2011,2010
- Current drivers: (Sri Lanka) Dilantha Malagamuwa
- Noted drivers: (Japan) Takuma Aoki (Japan) Ken Urata (Australia) Nathan Antunes (Sri Lanka) Ashan Silva (India) Armaan Ebrahim
- Teams' Championships: GT Asia Series 2010, Lamborghini Super Trofeo Asia Pro-AM B 2016
- Drivers' Championships: GT Asia Series 2010 Champion
- Website: www.dilangoracing.com

Dilango Racing, or the Dilango Racing Team, is the first International motor racing team in Sri Lanka. The team was founded by Sri Lankan racing driver, Dilantha Malagamuwa, in 2009 under the "Dilango Racing" name for the 2009 Formula V6 Asia Championship. Before that Malagamuwa was racing as an individual building up his racing career.

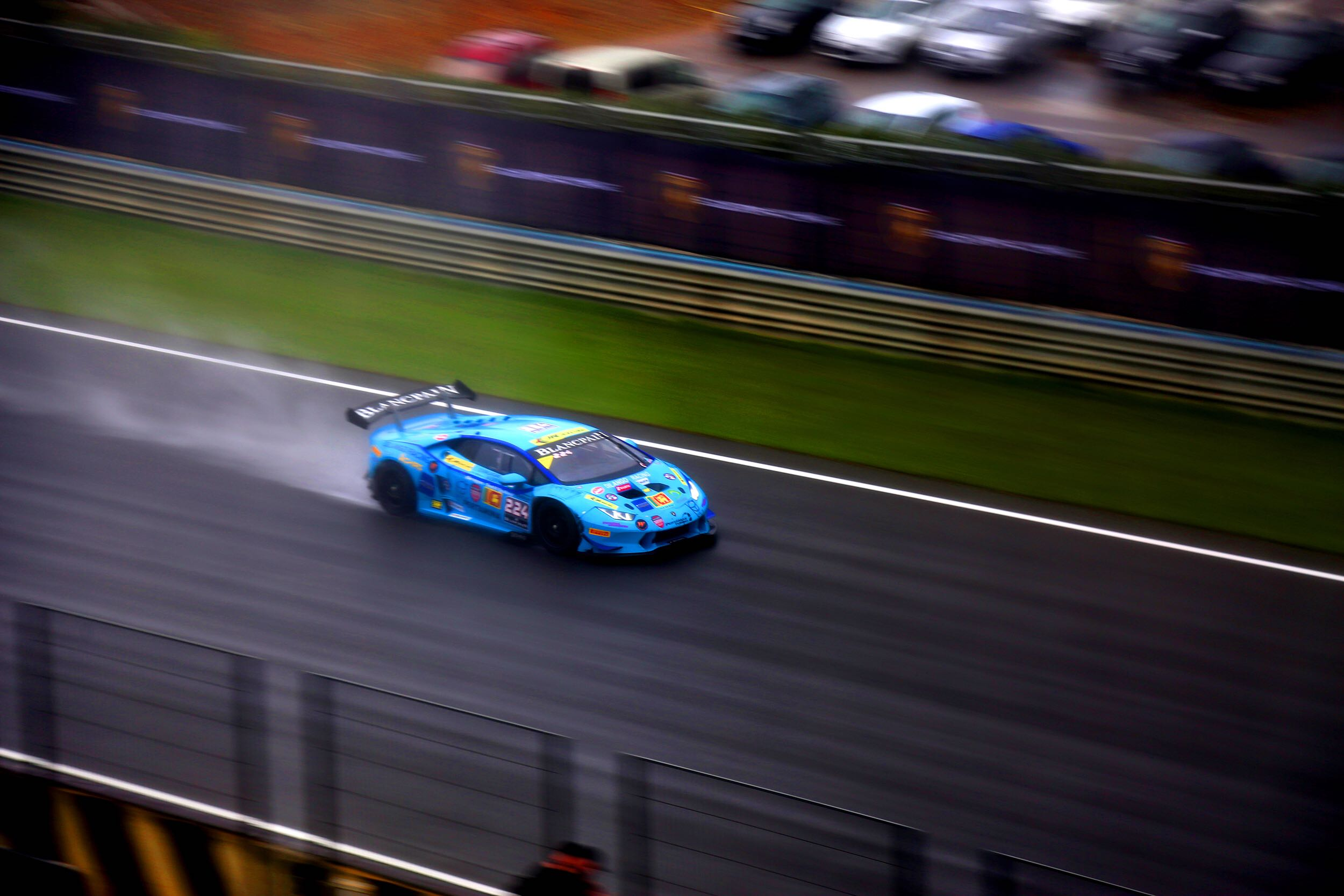
Dilango Racing Lamborghini Huracan LP 620-2 Super Trofeo at the Lamborghini Super Trofeo World Finals 2016, Valencia, Spain.
