= Dilantha Malagamuwa =

Sri Lankan racing driver (born 1963)

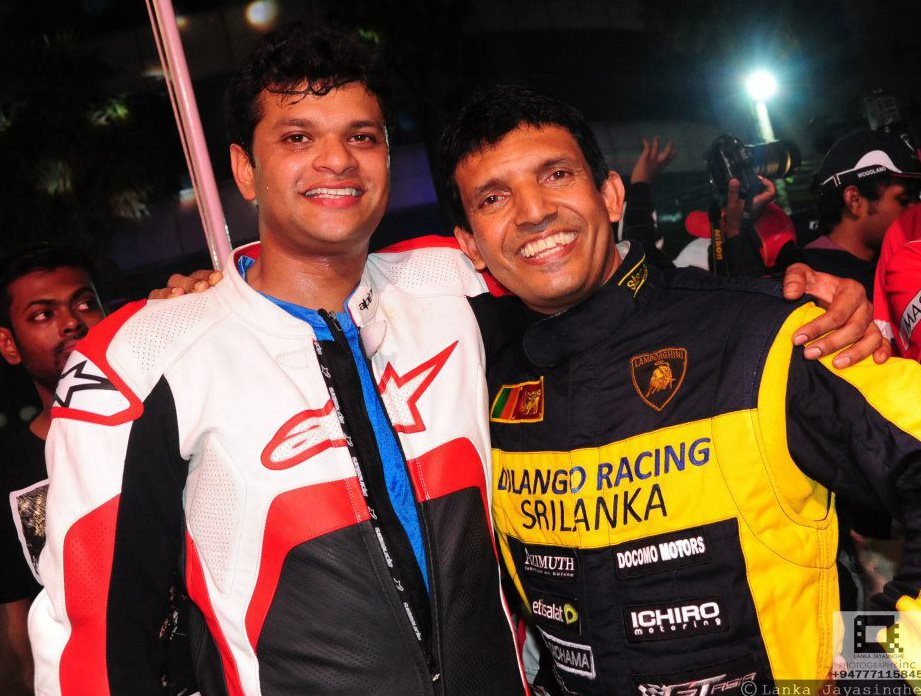
- Dilantha Malagamuwa (right) with the Black and Yellow Lamborghini Jacket on.
- Born: Dilantha Ranjula Bandara Malagamuwa; 24 June 1963 (age 63); Kurunegala, Sri Lanka
- Occupation: racing car driver
- Years active: 1979–present
- Television: Racing Life with Dilantha Malagamuwa
- Website: www.dilanthamalagamuwa.com

Dilantha Ranjula Bandara Malagamuwa (Sinhalese: ඩිලන්ත රන්ජුල බණ්ඩාර මාලගමුව, Tamil: டிலந்த ரஞ்சுல (B)பண்டார மாலகமுவ ) (born 24 June 1963) is a Sri Lankan racing driver currently racing for the Dilango Racing Team which he founded in 2009.

== Early life ==
Dilantha Malagamuwa was born on 24 June in Kurunegala and received his education at St. Annes's College and Trinity College Kandy. He started racing at the age 16 by winning a motorcycle race. His two sisters encouraged him and persuaded his father to buy him a Yamaha TZ350. In 1983, Malagamuwa participated in his first International race in Calcutta, India and managed to finish sixth. After the race, he met Matsumoto Kenmei, a Japanese motorbike racer who persuaded him to come to Japan to expand his racing career. In 1985, he went to Japan and in 1997, became the first non Japanese Asian to compete in the Japan top level Formula Nippon (F3000).

== Racing career achievements ==
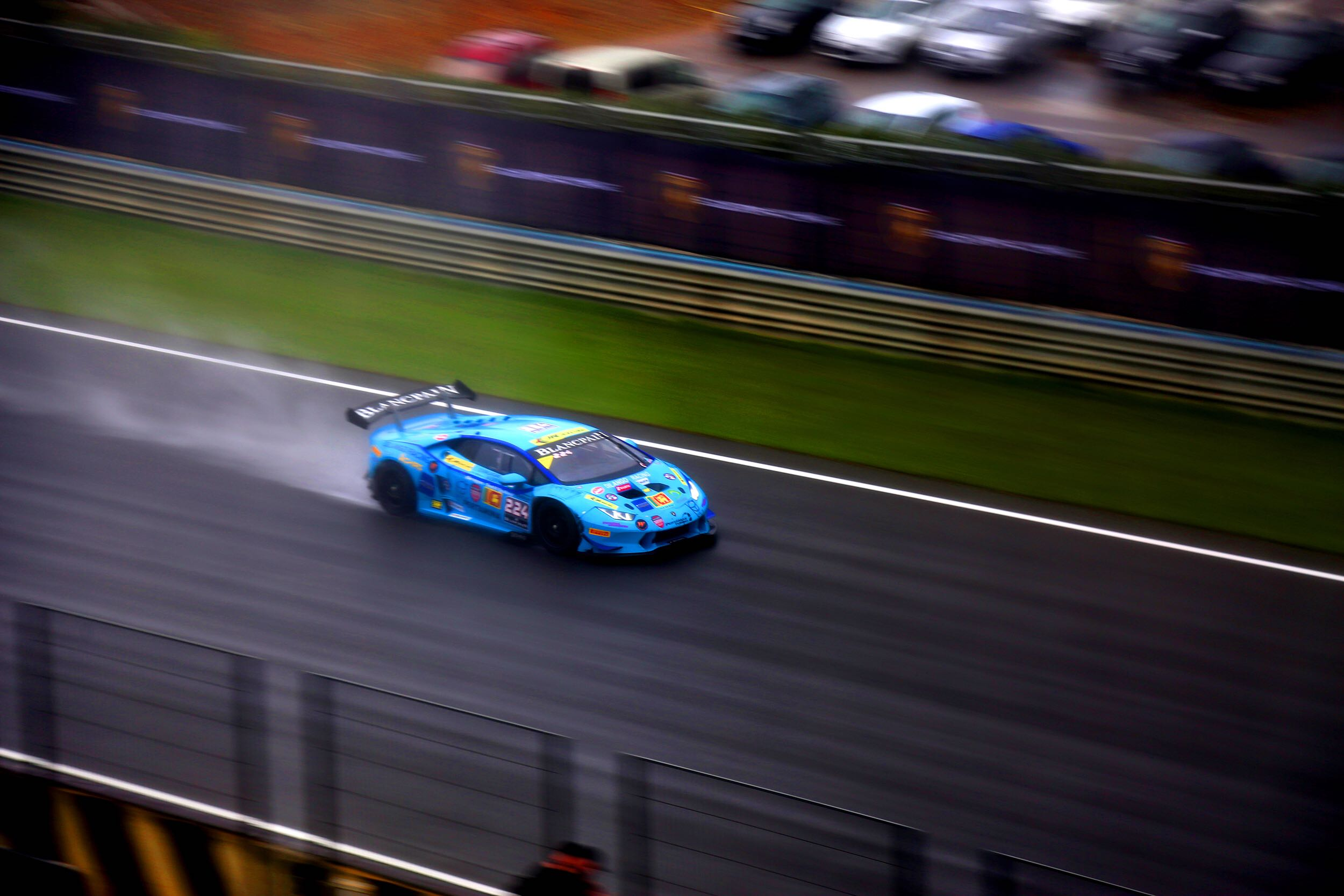
Dilantha Malagamuwa at the Lamborghini Super Trofeo world finals 2016, at the Circuit Ricardo Tormo in Valencia, Spain

- 1995 – N1 Championship (Japan) – Champion
- 2002 – Bathurst 24 Hours (AUS) – 1st Runner Up (Class A)
- 2006 – Malaysia Super Car Series – Champion
- 2007 – Malaysia Super Car Series – Champion
- 2008 – Aston Martin Asia Cup – 1st Runner Up
- 2009 – Aston Martin Asia Cup – 1st Runner Up
- 2010 – Malaysia GT Super Series – 1st Runner Up
- 2010 – GT Asia – Champion
- 2011 – GT Asia – 1st Runner Up
- 2011 – Malaysia GT Super Series – Champion
- 2013 – Asian Le Mans Series – Champion (GTC Am)
- 2014 – Lamborghini Super Trofeo Asian series – 1st Runner up.
- 2015 – Lamborghini Super Trofeo Asian series – 1st Runner up.
- 2016 – Lamborghini Super Trofeo Asian series – Champion (PRO-AM B).
- 2017 – NGK Enduro 3 Hour Endurance Race (Dubai) – Champion
- 2017 – Blancpain GT Sports Club – Champion (Xtra Class)
- 2017 - Lamborghini Super Trofeo World Finals, Imola, Italy (Race 2) – 3rd Place (AM Class – 5th Place Overall)
- 2019 - Blancpain GT Sports Club European Championship 3rd in the championship in Titanium Class
- 2023 - Katukurunda Speed SLGT 3500CC (Race 1 - Winner | Race 2 - P4)

== Awards and recognition ==
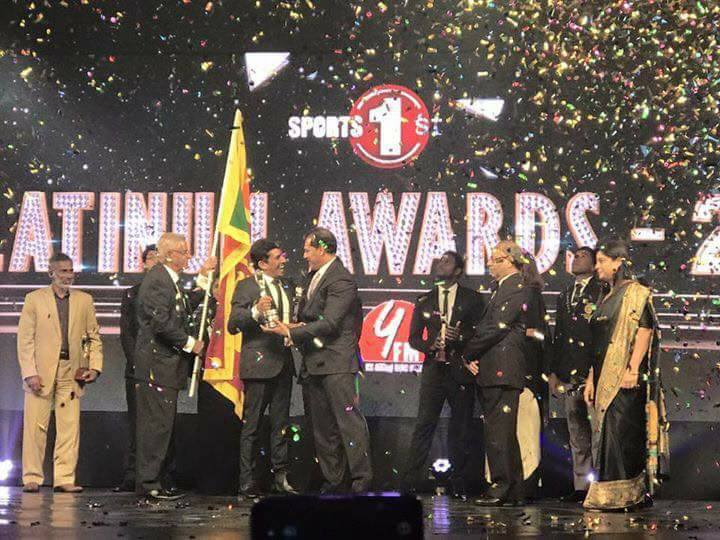
Sports First Platinum awards 2016, "Most Popular Player of the year" awarded to Dilantha Malagamuwa by sports minister of Sri Lanka Dayasiri Jayasekara

In 1997, after competing in Japan's top level Formula Nippon, the Prime minister of Japan, Keizo Obuchi, felicitated Dilantha for his effort in becoming the first non-Japanese Asian to achieve this feat.

In 2012, the Sri Lanka Auto Sports association awarded the national colours award and a special recognition to Dilantha Malagamuwa for his contribution to motorsports representing Sri Lanka in the International arena at the National Awards Presentation 2011. The award was presented by the president of SLAS, Rizvi Farook, and the Minister of Sports, Mahindananda Aluthgamage.

Dilantha was selected as the Brand Ambassador for the SLIM 14th Brand Excellence awards with the ceremony's theme being 'Will you race ahead of the rest?'.

President Maithripala Sirisena awarded the runner up Presidential award to Dilango Racing for being the "Most Outstanding Leisure Sports Provider of the Year 2015" and also another runner up Presidential Award to Dilantha Malagamuwa for being the "Most Outstanding Sportsman of the Year 2015"

Sports first Platinum Award 2016, which was held at the Stein studio, is considered the most prestigious award ceremony for sports people in Sri Lanka. Dilantha Malagamuwa was able to win two awards at the event, "Best Motor Sport Athlete of the Year" and "Most Popular Player of the Year"

On 19 November 2017, Dilantha Malagamuwa was placed 3rd on the 2nd race of the Lamborghini Super Trofeo world finals (AM class) and became the first and currently only Sri Lankan to secure a world title in motorsports. Dilantha who is also the only Sri Lankan to win an International championship series in motorsport lost his overall world title due to a crash on the 1st race while he was 4th on the race. Not only did he had to retire from the race but also faced a penalty for the next race by stepping down two place on the grid. However, Dilantha was awarded 11th place on the 1st race since he was able to complete 75% of the race and was added to the overall points of the Lamborghini Super Trofeo world finals 2017 and was given 5th position.

On 20 September 2018, Ada Derana hosted the Sri Lankan of the year 2018 awards. The national award ceremony felicitating Sri Lankans who have defied convention and raised the bar of excellence. The award ceremony was held for the 3rd consecutive year at the Hilton Colombo. Dilantha Malagamuwa received the Sri Lankan of the year award in the sports category for his contribution towards Motor racing in Sri Lanka.

== Personal life ==
Dilantha who is a Sri Lankan citizen also holds permanent residency in Japan. Currently living in Sri Lanka with his family, Dilantha runs the racing school at Katukurundha and at the Sepang International Racing circuit, Malaysia.

== Racing life with Dilantha Malagamuwa ( TV show ) ==
In 2016, the Dilango Racing Team got their own television show, Racing life with Dilantha Malagamuwa, covering all of their races throughout the year. The pilot episode aired on 21 September 2016 on ITN (Independent television network).

The show consists of 26 episodes which aired at prime time 9:30pm (local time) every Wednesdays. The season finale aired on 29 March 2017. Due to higher viewership demand and the popularity of the show ITN, officially announced their interest in renewing for the second season of the show.

The television show revolves around the racing tour of Dilantha Malagamuwa covering all of his races, traveling all around the world following his racing career, past achievements and historical moments in the racing arena with Dilantha narrating the stories.

=== Season 1 ===
The first season of the show was hosted and directed by former Sirasa Superstar host Manuranga Wijesekara, who is also the lyricist of the show's title song "Vegayen Dhuwana Sinhayo", which is composed and performed by Lahiru Perera (La Singore). The first season was produced by a small team, with Zayan Jeffry (WaveHunt) working on cinematography and Eshan Motagedhara (Vivid Motions) editing and producing the entire series. The first season of the show featured popular Sri Lankan artists and actors in several episodes.

=== Season 2 ===
The second season was given a different time slot from the first one and had an earlier start than expected. Although the expected date to start the season was in August, the 2nd season took off in June. ITN started airing Racing Life with Dilantha Malagamuwa Season 2 on Fridays at 7:00 pm. In this season the episodes revolve around the races covered in Europe tours. With the same team working on production the show got its own studio set located at Vivid Motions studio. The season finale was aired on 8 December 2017.

=== Season 3 ===
The third season completed its run on ITN Sri Lanka on 12 December 2018. Manuranga Wijesekara was featured as the host until the 17th episode after which the show was hosted by Dilantha Malagamuwa himself. The production crew remained the same with a few episodes directed by Zayan Jeffry and Eshan Motagedhara. The 3rd season also featured Sri Lankan cricketer Lasith Malinga.

== Ratha Gaaya (TV show) ==
After a 2 year break a new TV show was formulated by Pit Pass Sri Lanka, an independent motorsport network owned by Eshan Motagedhara who was one of the producers of Racing Life with Dilantha Malagamuwa. The show is narrated around the racing season of 2020 by Dilantha Malagamuwa which will eventually continue to the racing seasons of 2021 and further. The show also features Dilantha Malagamuwa's new co-driver for the 2021 racing season Ashan Silva and CMPM comedy duo Suneth Chithrananda and Gaminda Prithviraj. The pilot episode aired on 2 May 2021 on ITN.

== Acting career ==
His maiden cinematic appearance will come through Eranga Senaratne's film Nilu Man Adarei.
