= Yuan Bo =

Chinese racing driver (born 1987)

Yuan Bo 袁波
- Nationality: (China) Chinese
- Born: 24 September 1987 (age 39) Jiangsu, China
- Categorisation: FIA Silver (until 2023); FIA Bronze (2024–)

Championship titles
- 2024, 2025 2024 2016 2015 2010: GT World Challenge Asia; GT World Challenge Asia – Silver-Am; Porsche Carrera Cup Asia – Class B Lamborghini Super Trofeo Asia – Pro-Am; Volkswagen Polo Cup China

Yuan Bo (Chinese: 袁波; pinyin: Yuán Bō; born 24 September 1987), also known as Bob Yuan, is a Chinese racing driver competing in the China GT Championship for Winhere Origine Motorsport.

== Career ==
Yuan briefly raced in karts while studying in the United Kingdom at the age of 18, but made his racing debut in 2010 in Volkswagen Polo Cup China, which he won as a rookie. The following year, Yuan stepped up to Volkswagen Scirocco R-Cup China, finishing ninth in points in his first season, as well as making his single-seater debut in the Formula Challenger series. Remaining in Scirocco R-Cup China for 2012, Yuan finished runner-up in the overall standings behind Stefano Montesi.

Ahead of 2013, Yuan was selected by Volkswagen China to be part of their China Star Team as he made his full-time transition to single-seater racing by competing in Formula Masters China. While he finished ninth in the overall standings in FMCS, Yuan raced for Champ Motorsport in the Asian Formula Renault Series, scoring two wins and finishing runner-up in the Asian class. Switching to Eurasia Motorsport for his second season in Formula Masters China the following year, Yuan scored a lone podium at Zhuhai en route to an eighth-place points finish. During 2014, Yuan also raced part-time in the Formula Renault 2.0 Alps Series for Jenzer Motorsport and Koiranen GP, as well as winning the 3 Hours of Sepang in a one-off appearance in the Asian Le Mans Series LMP2 class with OAK Racing.

Continuing in Formula Masters China for 2015, Yuan joined Meritus.GP for the first two rounds, scoring a podium at Shanghai, before joining KCMG for the final three rounds and clinching a podium at Zhuhai to end the year eighth in points. In parallel, Yuan raced in Lamborghini Super Trofeo Asia with Star Racing Team alongside Edoardo Liberati, scoring five Pro-Am class wins and securing the title at the end of the year. At the beginning of 2016, Yuan raced in the last two rounds of the 2015–16 Asian Le Mans Series for Porsche-fielding KCMG, winning both races in the GT Am class. For the rest of 2016 and until 2018, Yuan primarily raced in Porsche Carrera Cup Asia, most notably winning the Class B title with Absolute Racing in his rookie year, with an overall podium at Shanghai to his name. Continuing with Absolute Racing through 2019, Yuan made his Blancpain GT World Challenge Asia debut with the Porsche customer team for his maiden season in GT3 competition. Racing in the Silver Cup for most of the season, Yuan scored an outright win at Shanghai, as well as a class win in Korea, to end the year eighth overall and sixth among the Silver Cup entries.

In 2020, Yuan was set to return to Absolute Racing for his second season in GT World Challenge Asia, but was left on the sidelines after the season was cancelled due to the Covid-19 pandemic. Returning to racing in 2021, Yuan spent two years in Porsche Carrera Cup Asia for Ivory Bay Capital and Zhengtong Racing Team respectively, before joining Porsche-affiliated R&B Racing to compete in the 2023 edition of GT World Challenge Asia. Partnered with Leo Ye Hongli on his series return, Yuan took a best result of second at Sepang to finish ninth in the overall standings and runner-up in the Silver Cup.

After being downgraded to FIA Bronze ahead of 2024, Yuan began the year by winning the Sepang 12 Hours, before reuniting with Leo Ye to continue in GT World Challenge Asia with the rebranded Origine Motorsport outfit. Racing in Silver-Am, Yuan scored outright wins at Fuji and Shanghai, as well as six class wins to secure both the overall and Silver-Am titles at season's end. Yuan then raced with the team in the GT class of the 2024–25 Asian Le Mans Series alongside Ye and Laurin Heinrich, before continuing with them for the rest of 2025 in GT World Challenge Asia in what was now a Pro-Am line-up. Starting off the season by taking an early championship lead with wins at Sepang and Mandalika, Yuan then won again at Fuji and clinched the overall title on countback, but only finished third in the Pro-Am standings. During 2025, Yuan also raced at the 2025 24 Hours of Spa for AV Racing by Car Collection Motorsport, winning the race in the Pro-Am class.

At the end of 2025, Yuan, Ye and Heinrich reunited at Origine to compete in the 2025–26 Asian Le Mans Series, scoring a pair of podiums, with a best result of second at Dubai, to take sixth in points. In parallel, Yuan also raced in the 2025–26 24H Series Middle East with the same team, securing an overall and Am win at the 2025 12 Hours of Malaysia en route to runner-up in the GT3 Am points. For the rest of 2026, Yuan remained with Origine to compete in the China GT Championship. During 2026, Yuan also returned to the 24 Hours of Spa with Porsche-fielding High Class Racing.

== Racing record ==
=== Racing career summary ===
Season	Series	Team	Races	Wins	Poles	F/Laps	Podiums	Points	Position
2010	Volkswagen Polo Cup China								**1st**
2011	Volkswagen Scirocco R-Cup China							34	9th
2011	Chinese Touring Car Championship – 1.6 Turbo							8	8th
2011	Formula Challenger								
2011	Malaysia Merdeka Endurance Race		1	0	0	0	0	—N/a	25th
2012	Volkswagen Scirocco R-Cup China	Blue						127	**2nd**
2012	Formula Pilota China	Eurasia Motorsport	3	0	0	0	0	0	NC
2012	Malaysia Merdeka Endurance Race		1	0	0	0	0	—N/a	17th
2013	Asian Formula Renault Series – Asian	Champ Motorsport	6	2	1	0	6	152	**2nd**
2013	Formula Masters China	Star Racing Team	18	0	0	0	0	29	9th
2013	Renault Clio Cup China		1	0	0	0	0	16	18th
2014	Formula Renault 2.0 Alps Series	Jenzer Motorsport	2	0	0	0	0	0	31st
2014	Formula Renault 2.0 Alps Series	Koiranen GP	4	0	0	0	0	0	31st
2014	Formula Masters China	Eurasia Motorsport	18	0	1	1	1	53	8th
2014	Asian Le Mans Series – LMP2	OAK Racing Team Total	1	1	0	0	1	26	4th
2015	Formula Masters China	Meritus.GP	5	0	0	0	1	57	8th
2015	Formula Masters China	Cebu Pacific Air by KCMG	9	0	0	0	1	57	8th
2015	Lamborghini Super Trofeo Asia – Pro-Am	Star Racing Team	10	5	3	0	7		**1st**
2015	Lamborghini Super Trofeo World Finals – Pro-Am	Star Racing Team						17	**2nd**
2015	Audi R8 LMS Cup China	Team Cedar Fund	2	0	0	0	0	0	NC
2015	Sepang 12 Hours – GTC Pro-Am	Top Speed Racing	1	1	0	0	1	—N/a	**1st**
2015–16	Asian Le Mans Series – GT Am	KCMG	2	2	2	0	2	52	**2nd**
2016	Porsche Carrera Cup Asia	Absolute Racing	12	0	0	0	1	114	8th
2017	Porsche Carrera Cup Asia	Team C&D Auto	13	0	0	0	0	97	9th
2017	Porsche Carrera Cup Asia – Invitational Race	Team C&D Auto	1	0	0	0	0	—N/a	16th
2017	China GT Championship – GTC	DMS Racing						6	23rd
2018	Porsche Carrera Cup Asia	Porsche Shanghai Waigaoqiao	12	0	0	0	0	93	10th
2018	Audi R8 LMS Cup – Invitational Race	Absolute Racing	1	1	1	0	1	—N/a	**1st**
2019	Blancpain GT World Challenge Asia – Pro-Am	Absolute Racing	2	0	0	0	0	22	22nd
2019	Blancpain GT World Challenge Asia – Silver	Absolute Racing	10	2	1	0	3	124	6th
2019	Porsche Carrera Cup Asia	Absolute Racing	3	0	0	0	0	22	19th
2021	Porsche Carrera Cup Asia	Ivory Bay Capital	15	0	0	0	0	117	7th
2022	Porsche Carrera Cup Asia	Zhengtong Racing Team							
2023	GT World Challenge Asia – Silver	R&B Racing	11	7	4	0	9	211	**2nd**
2024	Sepang 12 Hours	R&B Racing	1	1	0	0	1	—N/a	**1st**
2024	GT World Challenge Asia – Silver-Am	Origine Motorsport	12	8	6	0	10	238	**1st**
2024–25	Asian Le Mans Series – GT	Origine Motorsport	6	0	0	0	0	29	12th
2025	GT World Challenge Asia – Pro-Am	Origine Motorsport	12	3	2	0	6	151	**3rd**
2025	GT World Challenge Europe Endurance Cup – Pro-Am	AV Racing by Car Collection Motorsport	1	1	0	0	1	0	NC
2025	Intercontinental GT Challenge	AV Racing by Car Collection Motorsport	1	0	0	0	0	0	NC
2025–26	Asian Le Mans Series – GT	Origine Motorsport	6	0	0	0	2	58	6th
2025–26	24H Series Middle East – GT3 Am	Origine Motorsport	1	1	0	0	1	76	**2nd**
2025–26	24H Series Middle East – GT3 Am	Origine powered by CC	2	0	0	0	1	76	**2nd**
2026	China GT Championship – GT3 Pro-Am	Winhere Origine Motorsport	4	3	4	0	3	75*	1st*
2026	GT World Challenge Europe Endurance Cup – Pro-Am	High Class Racing	1	0	0	0	0	0	NC
2026	Intercontinental GT Challenge	High Class Racing	1	0	0	0	0	0	NC

=== Complete Formula Masters China results ===
(key) (Races in bold indicate pole position) (Races in italics indicate fastest lap)

Year	Entrant	1	2	3	4	5	6	7	8	9	10	11	12	13	14	15	16	17	18	19	20	DC	Points
2012	Eurasia Motorsport	SHI; 1	SHI; 2	SHI; 3	ORD1; 1	ORD1; 2	ORD1; 3	ORD2; 1	ORD2; 2	ORD2; 3	GUA; 1	GUA; 2	GUA; 3	SEP1; 1	SEP1; 2	SEP1; 3	SEP2; 1 Ret	SEP2; 2 Ret	SEP2; 3 Ret			NC	0
2013	Star Racing Team	ZHU; 1 Ret	ZHU; 2 Ret	ZHU; 3; 5	SHI1; 1; 6	SHI1; 2; 7	SHI1; 3; 8	ORD; 1; 8	ORD; 2; 8	INJ; 1 Ret	INJ; 2 Ret	INJ; 3; 11	INJ; 4; 7	SEP; 1 Ret	SEP; 2; 8	SEP; 3; 10	SHI2; 1; 13	SHI2; 2; 11	SHI2; 3; 11			9th	29
2014	Eurasia Motorsport	ZHU1; 1; 5	ZHU1; 2; 4	ZHU1; 3 C	SHI1; 1; 11	SHI1; 2; 12	SHI1; 3; 12	INJ; 1 Ret	INJ; 2; 7	INJ; 3; 4	INJ; 4 C	SEP; 1; 6	SEP; 2; 9	SEP; 3; 13	ZHU2; 1; 12	ZHU2; 2; 8	**ZHU2**; **3**; 8	ZHU2; 4; 2	SHI2; 1; 10	SHI2; 2; 13	SHI2; 3 Ret	8th	53
2015	Meritus.GP	SEP; 1; 8	SEP; 2 DNS	SEP; 3; 7	SHI1; 1; 8	SHI1; 2; 6	SHI1; 3; 3	PEN; 1	PEN; 2	PEN; 3												8th	57
2015	Cebu Pacific Air by KCMG										KUA; 1 Ret	KUA; 2 Ret	KUA; 3; 6	ZHU; 1; 7	ZHU; 2; 3	ZHU; 3; 9	SHI2; 1; 6	SHI2; 2; 7	SHI2; 3; 7			8th	57

=== Complete Formula Renault 2.0 Alps Series results ===
(key) (Races in bold indicate pole position; races in italics indicate fastest lap)

Year	Team	1	2	3	4	5	6	7	8	9	10	11	12	13	14	Pos	Points
2014	Jenzer Motorsport	IMO; 1 Ret	IMO; 2; 23	PAU; 1	PAU; 2	RBR; 1	RBR; 2									31st	0
2014	Koiranen GP							SPA; 1; 21	SPA; 2; 25	MNZ; 1 Ret	MNZ; 2 Ret	MUG; 1	MUG; 2	JER; 1	JER; 2	31st	0

=== Complete Asian Le Mans Series results ===
(key) (Races in bold indicate pole position) (Races in italics indicate fastest lap)

Year	Team	Class	Car	Engine	1	2	3	4	5	6	Pos.	Points
2014	OAK Racing Team Total	LMP2	Morgan LMP2	Judd HK 3.6 L V8	INJ	FUJ	SHA	**SEP**; 1			4th	26
2015–16	KCMG	GT Am	Porsche 997 GT3 Cup	Porsche 4.0 L Flat-6	FUJ	SEP	**BUR**; 1	**SEP**; 1			2nd	52
2024–25	Origine Motorsport	GT	Porsche 911 GT3 R (992)	Porsche 4.2 L Flat-6	SEP; 1 Ret	SEP; 2; 5	DUB; 2; 4	DUB; 2; 8	ABU; 1; 12	ABU; 2; 24	12th	29
2025–26	Origine Motorsport	GT	Porsche 911 GT3 R (992)	Porsche 4.2 L Flat-6	SEP; 1; 6	SEP; 2; 3	DUB; 1; 10	DUB; 2; 2	ABU; 1; 4	ABU; 2; 17	6th	58

=== Complete GT World Challenge Asia results ===
(key) (Races in bold indicate pole position) (Races in italics indicate fastest lap)

Year	Team	Car	Class	1	2	3	4	5	6	7	8	9	10	11	12	DC	Points
2019	Absolute Racing	Porsche 911 GT3 R (991)	Pro-Am	**SEP**; **1**; 6	**SEP**; **2**; 10											22nd	22
2019	Absolute Racing	Porsche 911 GT3 R (991)	Silver			CHA; 1; 5	CHA; 2 DSQ	SUZ; 1; 2	SUZ; 2; 6	FSW; 1; 8	FSW; 2; 13	KOR; 1; 5	KOR; 2; 3	SIC; 1; 11	**SIC**; **2**; 1	6th	124
2023	R&B Racing	Porsche 911 GT3 R (992)	Silver	BUR; 1; 1	BUR; 2; 2	**FSW**; **1** Ret	**FSW**; **2**; 1	SUZ; 1; 1	**SUZ**; **2**; 1	MOT; 1; 2	**MOT**; **2**; 1	OKA; 1 Ret	OKA; 2 DNS	**SEP**; **1**; 1	**SEP**; **2**; 1	2nd	211
2024	Origine Motorsport	Porsche 911 GT3 R (992)	Silver-Am	**SEP**; **1**; 1	**SEP**; **2**; 1	BUR; 1; 1	BUR; 2; 2	**FSW**; **1**; 1	FSW; 2 Ret	**SUZ**; **1**; 9	SUZ; 2; 1	**OKA**; **1**; 1	OKA; 2; 2	**SIC**; **1**; 1	SIC; 2; 1	1st	238
2025	Origine Motorsport	Porsche 911 GT3 R (992)	Pro-Am	SEP; 1; 1	SEP; 2; 3	MAN; 1; 1	MAN; 2; 4	BUR; 1 Ret	BUR; 2; 9	FSW; 1; 1	FSW; 2; 2	OKA; 1; 3	OKA; 2 Ret	BEI; 1; 7	BEI; 2; 6	3rd	151
