= 2014 3 Hours of Fuji =

Track map of the Fuji Speedway

The 2014 3 Hours of Fuji was the second round of the 2014 Asian Le Mans Series season. It took place on August 31, 2014, at Fuji Speedway in Oyama, Shizuoka, Japan.

== Race result ==
The race result was as follows. Class winners in bold.

Pos	Class	No	Team	Drivers	Chassis	Tyre	Laps
Pos	Class	No	Team	Drivers	Engine	Tyre	Laps
1	**LMP2**	**1**	**(France) OAK Racing Team Total**	**(United States) David Cheng (Japan) Keiko Ihara (China) Ho-Pin Tung**	**Morgan LMP2**	MI	**105**
1	**LMP2**	**1**	**(France) OAK Racing Team Total**	**(United States) David Cheng (Japan) Keiko Ihara (China) Ho-Pin Tung**	**Judd HK 3.6 L V8**	MI	**105**
2	LMP2	27	(Philippines) Eurasia Motorsport	(United Kingdom) Richard Bradley (United Kingdom) John Hartshorne (China) Pu Jun Jin	Oreca 03	MI	104
2	LMP2	27	(Philippines) Eurasia Motorsport	(United Kingdom) Richard Bradley (United Kingdom) John Hartshorne (China) Pu Jun Jin	Nissan VK45DE 4.5 L V8	MI	104
3	**GT**	**91**	**(Taiwan) AAI-Rstrada**	**(Netherlands) Carlo van Dam (Taiwan) Jun San Chen (Japan) Tatsuya Tanigawa**	**BMW Z4 GT3**	MI	**103**
3	**GT**	**91**	**(Taiwan) AAI-Rstrada**	**(Netherlands) Carlo van Dam (Taiwan) Jun San Chen (Japan) Tatsuya Tanigawa**	**BMW 4.4 L V8**	MI	**103**
4	GT	92	(Taiwan) AAI-Rstrada	(Taiwan) Hanchen Chen (Japan) Ryohei Sakaguchi (Germany) Marco Seefried	Nissan GT-R GT3	MI	102
4	GT	92	(Taiwan) AAI-Rstrada	(Taiwan) Hanchen Chen (Japan) Ryohei Sakaguchi (Germany) Marco Seefried	**Nissan 3.8 L V6**	MI	102
5	**CN**	**77**	**(Hong Kong) Craft-Bamboo Racing**	**(Switzerland) Mathias Beche (Macau) Kevin Tse (Canada) Samson Chan**	**Ligier JS53**	MI	**101**
5	**CN**	**77**	**(Hong Kong) Craft-Bamboo Racing**	**(Switzerland) Mathias Beche (Macau) Kevin Tse (Canada) Samson Chan**	**Honda 2.0 L I4**	MI	**101**
6	CN	21	(Malaysia) Team Avelon Formula	(Singapore) Denis Lian (Hong Kong) William Lok (Australia) James Mitchell	Wolf GB08	MI	97
6	CN	21	(Malaysia) Team Avelon Formula	(Singapore) Denis Lian (Hong Kong) William Lok (Australia) James Mitchell	Honda 2.0 L I4	MI	97
7	**GT-Am**	**11**	**(China) The Emperor Racing**	**(Japan) Akihiko Nakaya (Italy) Max Wiser (Italy) Giorgio Sanna**	**Lamborghini Gallardo**	MI	**94**
7	**GT-Am**	**11**	**(China) The Emperor Racing**	**(Japan) Akihiko Nakaya (Italy) Max Wiser (Italy) Giorgio Sanna**	**Lamborghini 5.2 L V10**	MI	**94**
DNF	GT	90	(Taiwan) AAI-Rstrada	(China) Yu Lam (Japan) Takamitsu Matsui (Japan) Takeshi Tsuchiya	Mercedes-Benz SLS AMG GT3	MI	82
DNF	GT	90	(Taiwan) AAI-Rstrada	(China) Yu Lam (Japan) Takamitsu Matsui (Japan) Takeshi Tsuchiya	Mercedes-Benz 6.2 L V8	MI	82
WD	GT-Am	82	(China) The Emperor Racing	(China) Jiang Xin (Japan) Hideshi Matsuda (Japan) Hironori Takeuchi	Lamborghini Gallardo	MI	–
WD	GT-Am	82	(China) The Emperor Racing	(China) Jiang Xin (Japan) Hideshi Matsuda (Japan) Hironori Takeuchi	Lamborghini 5.2 L V10	MI	–

Asian Le Mans Series
Previous race: 3 Hours of Inje	2014 season	Next race: 3 Hours of Shanghai
