= 2014 3 Hours of Sepang =

The layout of the Sepang International Circuit

The 2014 3 Hours of Sepang was the fourth and final round of the 2014 Asian Le Mans Series season. It took place on December 7, 2014, at Sepang International Circuit in Sepang, Selangor, Malaysia.

== Race result ==
The race result was as follows. Class winners in bold.

Pos	Class	No	Team	Drivers	Chassis	Tyre	Laps
Pos	Class	No	Team	Drivers	Engine	Tyre	Laps
1	**LMP2**	**1**	**(France) OAK Racing Team Total**	**(China) David Cheng** **(China) Ho-Pin Tung** **(China) Yuan Bo**	**Morgan LMP2**	MI	**77**
1	**LMP2**	**1**	**(France) OAK Racing Team Total**	**(China) David Cheng** **(China) Ho-Pin Tung** **(China) Yuan Bo**	**Judd HK 3.6 L V8**	MI	**77**
2	LMP2	27	(Philippines) Eurasia Motorsport	(United Kingdom) James Winslow (United Kingdom) John Hartshorne (China) Pu Jun Jin	Oreca 03	MI	75
2	LMP2	27	(Philippines) Eurasia Motorsport	(United Kingdom) James Winslow (United Kingdom) John Hartshorne (China) Pu Jun Jin	Nissan VK45DE 4.5 L V8	MI	75
3	**GT**	**33**	**(Singapore) Clearwater Racing**	**(Singapore) Weng Sun Mok** **(Japan) Hiroshi Hamaguchi** **(Singapore) Richard Wee**	**Ferrari 458 Italia GT3**	MI	**73**
3	**GT**	**33**	**(Singapore) Clearwater Racing**	**(Singapore) Weng Sun Mok** **(Japan) Hiroshi Hamaguchi** **(Singapore) Richard Wee**	**Ferrari F142 4.5 L V8**	MI	**73**
4	GT	91	(Chinese Taipei) AAI-Rstrada	(United Kingdom) Ollie Millroy (Taiwan) Jun San Chen (Japan) Tatsuya Tanigawa	BMW Z4 GT3	MI	72
4	GT	91	(Chinese Taipei) AAI-Rstrada	(United Kingdom) Ollie Millroy (Taiwan) Jun San Chen (Japan) Tatsuya Tanigawa	BMW 4.4 L V8	MI	72
5	GT	92	(Chinese Taipei) AAI-Rstrada	(Taiwan) Hanchen Chen (Japan) Ryohei Sakaguchi (Germany) Marco Seefried	BMW Z4 GT3	MI	72
5	GT	92	(Chinese Taipei) AAI-Rstrada	(Taiwan) Hanchen Chen (Japan) Ryohei Sakaguchi (Germany) Marco Seefried	BMW 4.4 L V8	MI	72
6	**CN**	**77**	**(Hong Kong) Craft-Bamboo Racing**	**(Hong Kong) Frank Yu** **(Macau) Kevin Tse** **(Australia) Jonathan Venter**	**Ligier JS53**	MI	**72**
6	**CN**	**77**	**(Hong Kong) Craft-Bamboo Racing**	**(Hong Kong) Frank Yu** **(Macau) Kevin Tse** **(Australia) Jonathan Venter**	**Honda 2.0 L I4**	MI	**72**
7	CN	21	(Malaysia) Team Avelon Formula	(Singapore) Denis Lian (Singapore) Sean Hudspeth	Wolf GB08	MI	71
7	CN	21	(Malaysia) Team Avelon Formula	(Singapore) Denis Lian (Singapore) Sean Hudspeth	Honda 2.0 L I4	MI	71
8	GT	90	(Chinese Taipei) AAI-Rstrada	(China) Yu Lam (Japan) Takamitsu Matsui (Japan) Takeshi Tsuchiya	Mercedes-Benz SLS AMG GT3	MI	71
8	GT	90	(Chinese Taipei) AAI-Rstrada	(China) Yu Lam (Japan) Takamitsu Matsui (Japan) Takeshi Tsuchiya	Mercedes-Benz 6.2 L V8	MI	71

Asian Le Mans Series
Previous race: 3 Hours of Shanghai	2014 season	Next race: None
