= 2014 Asian Le Mans Series =

Seasons
- ← 2013 2015–16 →

The 2014 Asian Le Mans Series was the third season of the Automobile Club de l'Ouest's Asian Le Mans Series. It is the fourth 24 Hours of Le Mans-based series created by the ACO, following the American Le Mans Series (since merged with the Rolex Sports Car Series to form the United SportsCar Championship), the European Le Mans Series and the FIA World Endurance Championship. The four event season began at the Inje Speedium on 20 July 2014 and ended at Sepang International Circuit in Selangor on 7 December 2014.

In the main LMP2 class, defending champions OAK Racing Team Total won all four races during the season to win both championship titles on offer. David Cheng – who won the class title in 2013 – and Ho-Pin Tung won the drivers' championship title, and were joined by Keiko Ihara at Fuji and Yuan Bo at Sepang. Chang and Tung finished 53 points clear of John Hartshorne and Pu Jun Jin, who drove for Eurasia Motorsport. Similarly in the CN class, Craft-Bamboo Racing won all four races against class rivals Team Avelon Formula and ATL Wolf Asia. Kevin Tse was the only driver that was a part of the Craft-Bamboo Racing team at every meeting, and thus claimed the championship by 50 points ahead of Denis Lian, who took a trio of runner-up finishes with Team Avelon Formula. Tse was joined by Mathias Beche (Inje and Fuji), Frank Yu (Inje and Sepang), Samson Chan (Fuji and Shanghai), Naoki Yokomizo (Shanghai) and Jonathan Venter (Sepang) for his victories.

The GT class was the most competitive of the series, with three different entries sharing the four victories. Fuji winners Jun San Chen and Tatsuya Tanigawa, driving for the AAI-Rstrada team, were crowned champions by seven points ahead of teammates and Inje winners Hanchen Chen and Marco Seefried. Clearwater Racing won the final two races with Mok Weng Sun a part of both victories. He was joined by Keita Sawa and Matt Griffin in Shanghai, and Hiroshi Hamaguchi and Richard Wee in Sepang. Ryohei Sakaguchi (Inje) and Carlo van Dam (Fuji) were third drivers in the respective AAI-Rstrada winning cars. The GT-Am class saw just two entries, both at the Fuji event and both fielded by China's The Emperor Racing. One of the cars was withdrawn, and thus the sister car of Giorgio Sanna, Akihiko Nakaya – who was moved from the withdrawn car to replace Jiang Xin – and Max Wiser won the class.

== Regulation changes ==
The top class of the series continued to be LMP2. The LMGTE and GTC categories were combined, along with Super GT GT300 class vehicles, into a single performance balanced GT category. Silver and bronze level drivers were required in the amateur division. A new class, replacing the LMPC category which was not utilized in 2013, allowed a variety of Group CN cars to compete with standardized Honda engines. These cars are eligible for competition through 2017. At the end of the season, the first place team in LMP2 and the top two teams in GT received automatic invitations to the 2015 24 Hours of Le Mans. The requirement for all competitors to have at least one driver from Asia was expanded to include any drivers from the Australasia region. To help reduce operational costs for the teams, only two crew members were allowed to be involved in a tyre change.

== Calendar ==
The 2014 calendar was revealed during the 2013 3 Hours of Sepang. The second round was to be held alongside the fifth round of the 2014 Super GT season at Fuji Speedway. After being removed from the provisional 2013 calendar the 3 Hours of Shanghai returned, racing at the same event alongside the tenth round of the 2014 World Touring Car Championship season. The season opening round at Inje Speedium was originally scheduled to be held on 6 July, but was later rescheduled to 20 July.

The schedule was revised again on 9 May with the round at Fuji being moved back three weeks and no longer on the same weekend as Super GT. As well as this, a round at the Buriram United International Circuit in Thailand was confirmed, replacing a round scheduled for the Zhuhai International Circuit. On 12 October, the round at the Buriram United International Circuit was removed from the calendar with no replacement.

| Rnd | Race | Circuit | Date |
|---|---|---|---|
| 1 | 3 Hours of Inje | Inje Speedium, Inje, South Korea | 20 July |
| 2 | 3 Hours of Fuji | Fuji Speedway, Oyama, Japan | 31 August |
| 3 | 3 Hours of Shanghai | Shanghai International Circuit, Jiading, China | 11 October |
| 4 | 3 Hours of Sepang | Sepang International Circuit, Selangor, Malaysia | 7 December |

== Teams and Drivers ==
All entries use Michelin tyres.

=== LMP2 ===
| Team | Car | Engine | No. | Drivers | Rounds |
|---|---|---|---|---|---|
| (France) OAK Racing Team Total | Morgan LMP2 | Judd HK 3.6 L V8 | 1 | (China) David Cheng | All |
| (France) OAK Racing Team Total | Morgan LMP2 | Judd HK 3.6 L V8 | 1 | (China) Ho-Pin Tung | All |
| (France) OAK Racing Team Total | Morgan LMP2 | Judd HK 3.6 L V8 | 1 | (Japan) Keiko Ihara | 2 |
| (France) OAK Racing Team Total | Morgan LMP2 | Judd HK 3.6 L V8 | 1 | (China) Yuan Bo | 4 |
| (Philippines) Eurasia Motorsport | Oreca 03 | Nissan VK45DE 4.5 L V8 | 27 | (United Kingdom) John Hartshorne | All |
| (Philippines) Eurasia Motorsport | Oreca 03 | Nissan VK45DE 4.5 L V8 | 27 | (United Kingdom) Richard Bradley | 1–2 |
| (Philippines) Eurasia Motorsport | Oreca 03 | Nissan VK45DE 4.5 L V8 | 27 | (South Korea) Tacksung Kim | 1 |
| (Philippines) Eurasia Motorsport | Oreca 03 | Nissan VK45DE 4.5 L V8 | 27 | (China) Kevin Pu Junjin | 2–4 |
| (Philippines) Eurasia Motorsport | Oreca 03 | Nissan VK45DE 4.5 L V8 | 27 | (United Kingdom) James Winslow | 3–4 |

=== CN ===
| Team | Car | Engine | No. | Drivers | Rounds |
|---|---|---|---|---|---|
| (Italy) Team Avelon Formula | Wolf GB08 | Honda K20A 2.0 L I4 | 21 | (Singapore) Denis Lian | 2–4 |
| (Italy) Team Avelon Formula | Wolf GB08 | Honda K20A 2.0 L I4 | 21 | (Hong Kong) William Lok | 2 |
| (Italy) Team Avelon Formula | Wolf GB08 | Honda K20A 2.0 L I4 | 21 | (Australia) James Mitchell | 2 |
| (Italy) Team Avelon Formula | Wolf GB08 | Honda K20A 2.0 L I4 | 21 | (Italy) Guglielmo Belotti | 3 |
| (Italy) Team Avelon Formula | Wolf GB08 | Honda K20A 2.0 L I4 | 21 | (Singapore) Sean Hudspeth | 4 |
| (Canada) ATL Wolf Asia | Wolf GB08 | Honda K20A 2.0 L I4 | 45 | (Malaysia) Dominic Ang | 1 |
| (Canada) ATL Wolf Asia | Wolf GB08 | Honda K20A 2.0 L I4 | 45 | (Malaysia) Gilbert Ang | 1 |
| (Hong Kong) Craft-Bamboo Racing | Ligier JS53 | Honda K20A 2.0 L I4 | 77 | (Macau) Kevin Tse | All |
| (Hong Kong) Craft-Bamboo Racing | Ligier JS53 | Honda K20A 2.0 L I4 | 77 | (Switzerland) Mathias Beche | 1–2 |
| (Hong Kong) Craft-Bamboo Racing | Ligier JS53 | Honda K20A 2.0 L I4 | 77 | (Hong Kong) Frank Yu | 1, 4 |
| (Hong Kong) Craft-Bamboo Racing | Ligier JS53 | Honda K20A 2.0 L I4 | 77 | (Canada) Samson Chan | 2–3 |
| (Hong Kong) Craft-Bamboo Racing | Ligier JS53 | Honda K20A 2.0 L I4 | 77 | (Japan) Naoki Yokomizo | 3 |
| (Hong Kong) Craft-Bamboo Racing | Ligier JS53 | Honda K20A 2.0 L I4 | 77 | (Australia) Jonathan Venter | 4 |

=== GT ===
| Team | Car | Engine | No. | Drivers | Rounds |
|---|---|---|---|---|---|
| (China) Python | Ferrari 458 Italia GT3 | Ferrari F136 4.5 L V8 | 7 | (China) Zou Si Rui | 1 |
| (China) Python | Ferrari 458 Italia GT3 | Ferrari F136 4.5 L V8 | 7 | (China) Xu Wei | 1 |
| (Singapore) Clearwater Racing | Ferrari 458 Italia GT3 | Ferrari F136 4.5 L V8 | 33 | (Singapore) Weng Sun Mok | 3–4 |
| (Singapore) Clearwater Racing | Ferrari 458 Italia GT3 | Ferrari F136 4.5 L V8 | 33 | (Republic of Ireland) Matt Griffin | 3 |
| (Singapore) Clearwater Racing | Ferrari 458 Italia GT3 | Ferrari F136 4.5 L V8 | 33 | (Japan) Keita Sawa | 3 |
| (Singapore) Clearwater Racing | Ferrari 458 Italia GT3 | Ferrari F136 4.5 L V8 | 33 | (Japan) Hiroshi Hamaguchi | 4 |
| (Singapore) Clearwater Racing | Ferrari 458 Italia GT3 | Ferrari F136 4.5 L V8 | 33 | (Singapore) Richard Wee | 4 |
| (Chinese Taipei) AAI-Rstrada | Mercedes-Benz SLS AMG GT3 | Mercedes-AMG M159 6.2 L V8 | 90 | (Japan) Takamitsu Matsui | All |
| (Chinese Taipei) AAI-Rstrada | Mercedes-Benz SLS AMG GT3 | Mercedes-AMG M159 6.2 L V8 | 90 | (Japan) Takeshi Tsuchiya | All |
| (Chinese Taipei) AAI-Rstrada | Mercedes-Benz SLS AMG GT3 | Mercedes-AMG M159 6.2 L V8 | 90 | (China) Lam Yu | All |
| (Chinese Taipei) AAI-Rstrada | BMW Z4 GT3 | BMW P65B44 4.4 L V8 | 91 | (Chinese Taipei) Jun-San Chen | All |
| (Chinese Taipei) AAI-Rstrada | BMW Z4 GT3 | BMW P65B44 4.4 L V8 | 91 | (Japan) Tatsuya Tanigawa | All |
| (Chinese Taipei) AAI-Rstrada | BMW Z4 GT3 | BMW P65B44 4.4 L V8 | 91 | (United Kingdom) Ollie Millroy | 1, 3–4 |
| (Chinese Taipei) AAI-Rstrada | BMW Z4 GT3 | BMW P65B44 4.4 L V8 | 91 | (Netherlands) Carlo van Dam | 2 |
| (Chinese Taipei) AAI-Rstrada | BMW Z4 GT3 | BMW P65B44 4.4 L V8 | 92 | (Chinese Taipei) Han-Chen Chen | 1, 3–4 |
| (Chinese Taipei) AAI-Rstrada | BMW Z4 GT3 | BMW P65B44 4.4 L V8 | 92 | (Germany) Marco Seefried | 1, 3–4 |
| (Chinese Taipei) AAI-Rstrada | BMW Z4 GT3 | BMW P65B44 4.4 L V8 | 92 | (Japan) Ryohei Sakaguchi | 1, 4 |
| (Chinese Taipei) AAI-Rstrada | BMW Z4 GT3 | BMW P65B44 4.4 L V8 | 92 | (Germany) Jörg Müller | 3 |
| (Chinese Taipei) AAI-Rstrada | Nissan GT-R GT3 | Nissan VR38DETT 3.8 L Twin-turbo V6 | 92 | (Chinese Taipei) Han-Chen Chen | 2 |
| (Chinese Taipei) AAI-Rstrada | Nissan GT-R GT3 | Nissan VR38DETT 3.8 L Twin-turbo V6 | 92 | (Japan) Ryohei Sakaguchi | 2 |
| (Chinese Taipei) AAI-Rstrada | Nissan GT-R GT3 | Nissan VR38DETT 3.8 L Twin-turbo V6 | 92 | (Germany) Marco Seefried | 2 |

=== GT Am ===
| Team | Car | Engine | No. | Drivers | Rounds |
|---|---|---|---|---|---|
| (China) The Emperor Racing | Lamborghini Gallardo | Lamborghini 5.2 L V10 | 11 | (Japan) Akihiko Nakaya | 2 |
| (China) The Emperor Racing | Lamborghini Gallardo | Lamborghini 5.2 L V10 | 11 | (Italy) Giorgio Sanna | 2 |
| (China) The Emperor Racing | Lamborghini Gallardo | Lamborghini 5.2 L V10 | 11 | (Italy) Max Wiser | 2 |
| (China) The Emperor Racing | Lamborghini Gallardo | Lamborghini 5.2 L V10 | 82 | (Japan) Hideshi Matsuda | 2 |
| (China) The Emperor Racing | Lamborghini Gallardo | Lamborghini 5.2 L V10 | 82 | (Japan) Hironori Takeuchi | 2 |
| (China) The Emperor Racing | Lamborghini Gallardo | Lamborghini 5.2 L V10 | 82 | (China) Jiang Xin | 2 |

== Season results ==
| Rnd. | Circuit | LMP2 Winning Team | CN Winning Team | GT Winning Team | Results |
| Rnd. | Circuit | LMP2 Winning Drivers | CN Winning Drivers | GT Winning Drivers | Results |
|---|---|---|---|---|---|
| 1 | Inje | (France) No. 1 OAK Racing Team Total | (Hong Kong) No. 77 Craft-Bamboo Racing | (Chinese Taipei) No. 92 AAI-Rstrada | Report |
| 1 | Inje | (China) David Cheng (China) Ho-Pin Tung | (Switzerland) Mathias Beche (Macau) Kevin Tse (Hong Kong) Frank Yu | (Chinese Taipei) Han-Chen Chen (Japan) Ryohei Sakaguchi (Germany) Marco Seefried | Report |
| 2 | Fuji | (France) No. 1 OAK Racing Team Total | (Hong Kong) No. 77 Craft-Bamboo Racing | (Chinese Taipei) No. 91 AAI-Rstrada | Report |
| 2 | Fuji | (China) David Cheng (Japan) Keiko Ihara (China) Ho-Pin Tung | (Switzerland) Mathias Beche (Canada) Samson Chan (Macau) Kevin Tse | (Chinese Taipei) Jun-San Chen (Netherlands) Carlo van Dam (Japan) Tatsuya Tanigawa | Report |
| 3 | Shanghai | (France) No. 1 OAK Racing Team Total | (Hong Kong) No. 77 Craft-Bamboo Racing | (Singapore) No. 33 Clearwater Racing | Report |
| 3 | Shanghai | (China) David Cheng (China) Ho-Pin Tung | (Canada) Samson Chan (Macau) Kevin Tse (Japan) Naoki Yokomizo | (Japan) Keita Sawa (Republic of Ireland) Matt Griffin (Singapore) Weng Sun Mok | Report |
| 4 | Sepang | (France) No. 1 OAK Racing Team Total | (Hong Kong) No. 77 Craft-Bamboo Racing | (Singapore) No. 33 Clearwater Racing | Report |
| 4 | Sepang | (China) Yuan Bo (China) David Cheng (China) Ho-Pin Tung | (Macau) Kevin Tse (Australia) Jonathan Venter (Hong Kong) Frank Yu | (Japan) Hiroshi Hamaguchi (Singapore) Weng Sun Mok (Singapore) Richard Wee | Report |

== Championship Standings ==
Scoring system

Points System
| Position | | | | | | | | | | Pole Position |
| 1st | 2nd | 3rd | 4th | 5th | 6th | 7th | 8th | 9th | 10th | Pole Position |
|---|---|---|---|---|---|---|---|---|---|---|
| 25 | 18 | 15 | 12 | 10 | 8 | 6 | 4 | 2 | 1 | 1 |

== Teams Championships ==
=== LMP2 Standings ===
| Pos. | Team | Car | INJ (South Korea) | FUJ (Japan) | SHA (China) | SEP (Malaysia) | Total |
|---|---|---|---|---|---|---|---|
| 1 | (France) #1 OAK Racing Team Total | Morgan LMP2 | **1** | 1 | **1** | **1** | 103 |
| 2 | (Philippines) #27 Eurasia Motorsport | Oreca 03 | Ret | **2** | 2 | 2 | 55 |

Key
| Colour | Result |
|---|---|
| Gold | Race winner |
| Silver | 2nd place |
| Bronze | 3rd place |
| Green | Points finish |
| Blue | Non-points finish |
| Blue | Non-classified finish (NC) |
| Purple | Did not finish (Ret) |
| Black | Disqualified (DSQ) |
| Black | Excluded (EX) |
| White | Did not start (DNS) |
| White | Race cancelled (C) |
| White | Withdrew (WD) |
| Blank | Did not participate |

**Bold** – Pole

=== CN Standings ===
| Pos. | Team | Car | INJ (South Korea) | FUJ (Japan) | SHA (China) | SEP (Malaysia) | Total |
|---|---|---|---|---|---|---|---|
| 1 | (Hong Kong) #77 Craft-Bamboo Racing | Ligier JS53 | **1** | **1** | **1** | **1** | 104 |
| 2 | (Italy) #21 Team Avelon Formula | Wolf GB08 | | 2 | 2 | 2 | 54 |
| 3 | (Canada) #45 ATL Wolf Asia | Wolf GB08 | DNS | | | | – |

Key
| Colour | Result |
|---|---|
| Gold | Race winner |
| Silver | 2nd place |
| Bronze | 3rd place |
| Green | Points finish |
| Blue | Non-points finish |
| Blue | Non-classified finish (NC) |
| Purple | Did not finish (Ret) |
| Black | Disqualified (DSQ) |
| Black | Excluded (EX) |
| White | Did not start (DNS) |
| White | Race cancelled (C) |
| White | Withdrew (WD) |
| Blank | Did not participate |

**Bold** – Pole

=== GT Standings ===
| Pos. | Team | Car | INJ (South Korea) | FUJ (Japan) | SHA (China) | SEP (Malaysia) | Total |
|---|---|---|---|---|---|---|---|
| 1 | (Chinese Taipei) #91 AAI-Rstrada | BMW Z4 GT3 | 3 | 1 | 2 | 2 | 76 |
| 2 | (Chinese Taipei) #92 AAI-Rstrada | BMW Z4 GT3; Nissan GT-R GT3 | 1 | 2 | 4 | **3** | 70 |
| 3 | (Singapore) #33 Clearwater Racing | Ferrari 458 Italia GT3 | | | 1 | 1 | 50 |
| 4 | (Chinese Taipei) #90 AAI-Rstrada | Mercedes-Benz SLS AMG GT3 | **2** | **Ret** | **3** | 4 | 48 |
| 5 | (China) #7 Python | Ferrari 458 Italia GT3 | DNS | | | | – |

Key
| Colour | Result |
|---|---|
| Gold | Race winner |
| Silver | 2nd place |
| Bronze | 3rd place |
| Green | Points finish |
| Blue | Non-points finish |
| Blue | Non-classified finish (NC) |
| Purple | Did not finish (Ret) |
| Black | Disqualified (DSQ) |
| Black | Excluded (EX) |
| White | Did not start (DNS) |
| White | Race cancelled (C) |
| White | Withdrew (WD) |
| Blank | Did not participate |

**Bold** – Pole

=== GT Am Standings ===
| Pos. | Team | Car | INJ (South Korea) | FUJ (Japan) | SHA (China) | SEP (Malaysia) | Total |
|---|---|---|---|---|---|---|---|
| 1 | (China) #11 The Emperor Racing | Lamborghini Gallardo | | **1** | | | 26 |
| 2 | (China) #82 The Emperor Racing | Lamborghini Gallardo | | WD | | | – |

Key
| Colour | Result |
|---|---|
| Gold | Race winner |
| Silver | 2nd place |
| Bronze | 3rd place |
| Green | Points finish |
| Blue | Non-points finish |
| Blue | Non-classified finish (NC) |
| Purple | Did not finish (Ret) |
| Black | Disqualified (DSQ) |
| Black | Excluded (EX) |
| White | Did not start (DNS) |
| White | Race cancelled (C) |
| White | Withdrew (WD) |
| Blank | Did not participate |

**Bold** – Pole
