= Ryohei Sakaguchi =

Japanese racing driver (born 1975)

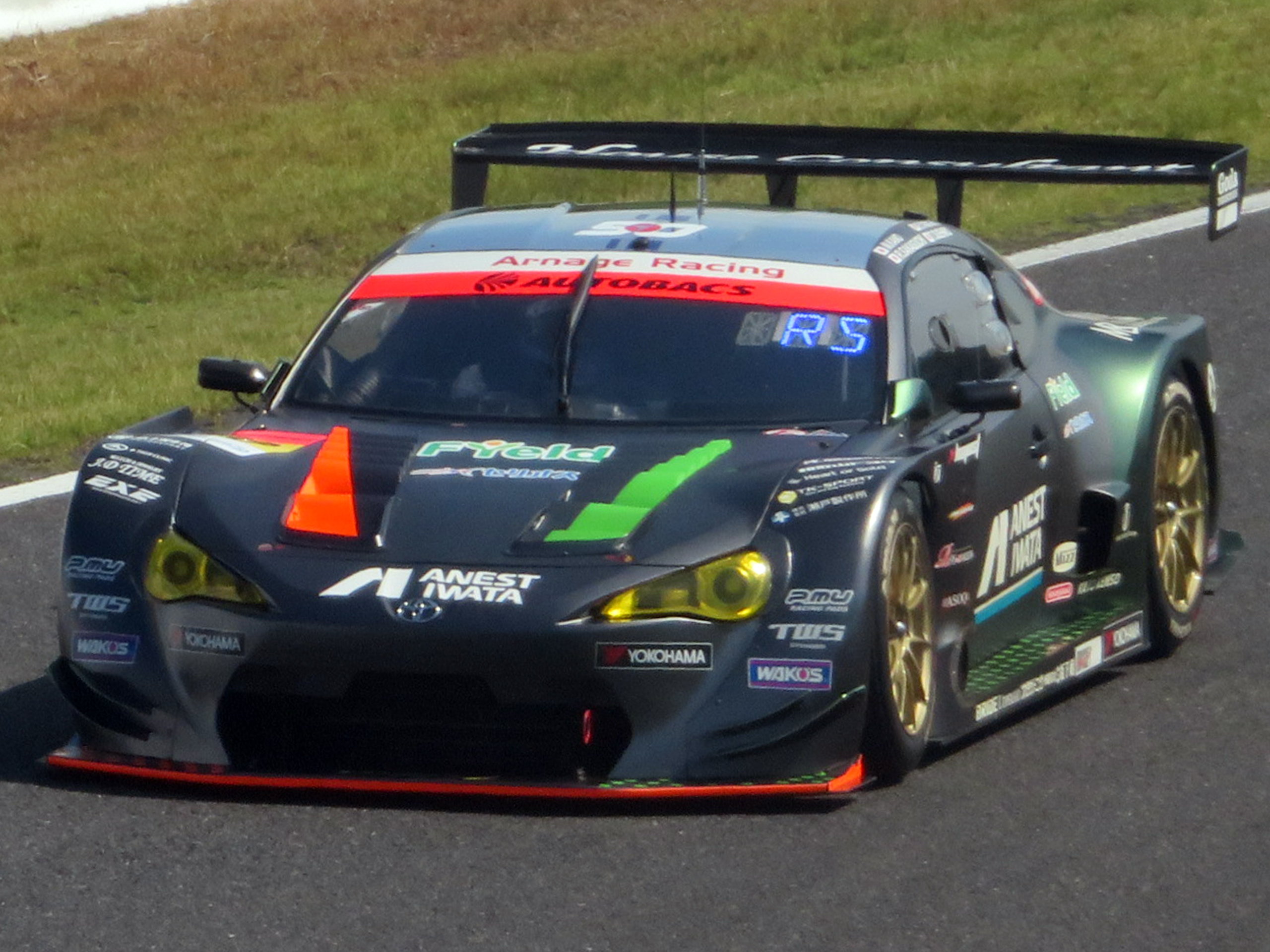
- Sakaguchi in 2022
- Nationality: (Japan) Japanese
- Born: 6 February 1975 (age 51) Habikino, Japan
- Relatives: Sena Sakaguchi (nephew)
- Categorisation: FIA Silver

Championship titles
- 2016, 2018 2010–2012 2003 1996 1996: Super Taikyu – ST-3; Super Taikyu – ST-2; Korean Formula 1800 Series; JAF Formula 4 Okayama Series; JAF Formula 4 Mine Series

Ryohei Sakaguchi (阪口 良平, Sakaguchi Ryōhei; born 6 February 1975 in Habikino) is a Japanese racing driver competing in Super Taikyu for Mazda Spirit Racing.

Sakaguchi won the 2003 Korean Formula 1800 Series and has five Super Taikyu titles to his name, two in ST-3 and three in ST-2.

== Career ==
Sakaguchi made his single-seater debut in 1995, racing in both the JAF Formula 4 Okayama and Suzuka Series. After winning both the Okayama and Mine title the following year, Sakaguchi then raced part-time in various series until 2003, when he won the Korean Formula 1800 Series. Following that, Sakaguchi raced sporadically until 2008, when he partook in his first full-season in the series for Team Uematsu Nova, as well as finishing runner-up in the Super 2000 standings of the Superrace Championship in 2009 and third in Super 3800 the same year.

Racing mainly in Super Taikyu until 2012, Sakaguchi won the ST-2 class title three times, before making one-off appearances in the LMGTE class of the Asian Le Mans Series for AAI-Rstrada, and in the GT300 class of Super GT for Arnage Racing. Sakaguchi then returned to Asian Le Mans Series the following year, racing in all but one rounds and finishing third in the GT standings with a win at Inje. After competing in the last five rounds of the 2015 Super GT season for Pacific Racing Team in GT300, Sakaguchi raced part-time in the LMP3 class of the 2015–16 Asian Le Mans Series, finishing second at Buriram.

With Pacific Racing Team switching to the Porsche 911 for the 2016 season, Sakaguchi remained with the team alongside Hiroki Yoshida, scoring a best result of eighth at Motegi in his second season with the team. In early 2017, it was announced that EIcars Bentley TTO would join Super GT, with Sakaguchi and Yuji Ide as their drivers. In their first season in the series, the team scored a best result of 16th at Fuji. Sakaguchi remained with EIcars Bentley for the 2018 season, partnering Ide for the second season in a row. At the second Fuji round, Sakaguchi scored the team's best result by finishing 13th.

With the EIcars Bentley team ceasing operations in early 2019, Sakaguchi was left without a seat for most of the season, only making a one-off appearance for Team Mach at the fifth round of the season at Fuji as a third driver alongside Yuya Hiraki and Natsu Sakaguchi. Following his one-off outing for Team Mach in 2019, Sakaguchi returned to full-time competition in 2020, joining muta Racing INGING alongside Kazuto Kotaka. Sakaguchi scored two podiums, at Suzuka and at the season-finale at Fuji.

With Inging Motorsport merging their GT300 operations with Cars Tokai Dream28 ahead of the 2021 season, Sakaguchi joined Hiroki Katoh at the newly-rebranded muta Racing INGING. At Motegi, Sakaguchi scored his maiden win in GT300 by taking advantage of a mid-race safety car. In early 2022, Sakaguchi joined Arnage Racing, alongside Masaki Kano, Ryosei Yamashita and Takeshi Suehiro. Sakaguchi scored his only points of the season by finishing seventh at the fourth round of the season at Fuji.

After his stint at Arnage Racing, Sakaguchi returned to Pacific Racing Team after a seven year hiatus, alongside Liang Jiatong. At the second Suzuka round, Sakaguchi finished 11th, which would be the team's best result of the season. In 2024, Sakaguchi returned to Pacific Racing Team, teaming up with Yusuke Tomibayashi. Sakaguchi scored a best result of 12th at Fuji. Ahead of the 2025 season, it was announced that Sakaguchi would return to Pacific Racing Team, alongside the returning Tomibayashi and Yuta Fujiwara. Racing in all but two rounds, Sakaguchi scored a best result of fifth at Okayama en route to a 26th-place points finish.

In 2026, Sakaguchi left Pacific Racing Team as he primarily raced in the ST-Q class of Super Taikyu for Mazda Spirit Racing.

== Personal life ==
Sakaguchi is the uncle of 2020 Formula Regional Japan champion Sena Sakaguchi.

== Racing record ==
=== Racing career summary ===
Season	Series	Team	Races	Wins	Poles	F/Laps	Podiums	Points	Position
1995	JAF Formula 4 – Okayama Series								6th
1995	JAF Formula 4 – Suzuka Series								7th
1996	JAF Formula 4 – Okayama Series								**1st**
1996	JAF Formula 4 – Mine Series								**1st**
1997	Japanese Formula 3 Championship	Akiland Racing	5	0	0	0	0	0	NC
1998	Honda Civic Intercup Series								10th
2000	Formula Dream								4th
2003	Korean Formula 1800 Series								**1st**
2005	Suzuka 1000 km – RS	Max Racing	1	1	0	0	1	—N/a	**1st**
2006	Super GT – GT300	910 Racing With Team Ishimatsu	2	0	0	0	0	4	33rd
2007	Super GT – GT300	Yokoyama Racing	2	0	0	0	0	5	25th
2007	Super GT – GT300	Team Uematsu	3	0	0	0	0	5	25th
2008	Super GT – GT300	Team Uematsu Nova	9	0	0	0	0	24	17th
2009	Superrace Championship – Super 2000								**2nd**
2009	Superrace Championship – Super 3800								**3rd**
2010	Super GT – GT300	Team RQS Motorsports	1	0	0	0	0	0	NC
2012	Japanese Formula 3 Championship – National Class	CMS Motor Sports Project	2	0	0	0	1	6	8th
2012	Super GT – GT300	JLOC	2	0	0	0	0	2	26th
2013	Asian Le Mans Series – LMGTE	AAI-Rstrada	1	0	0	0	1	18	**3rd**
2013	Super GT – GT300	Arnage Racing	2	0	0	0	0	4	24th
2014	Asian Le Mans Series – GT	AAI-Rstrada	3	1	0	1	3	58	**3rd**
2015	Super GT – GT300	Pacific Racing Team	5	0	0	0	0	0	NC
2015–16	Asian Le Mans Series – LMP3	Team AAI	2	0	0	0	1	18	4th
2016	Sepang 12 Hours – GT4	Muta Racing TWS RC350	1	0	1	0	1	N/A	**2nd**
2016	Super GT – GT300	Gulf Racing with Pacific	7	0	0	0	0	3	22nd
2016–17	Asian Le Mans Series – LMP3	FIST-Team AAI	1	0	0	0	0	0	17th
2017	Super GT – GT300	EIcars Bentley TTO	6	0	0	0	0	0	NC
2017	Super Taikyu – ST-3	Tracy Sports	6	1	1	4	3	79‡	4th‡
2018	Super GT – GT300	EIcars Bentley	7	0	0	0	0	0	NC
2018	Super Taikyu – ST-3	Tracy Sports	6	2	1	3	5	130.5‡	**1st‡**
2019	Super GT – GT300	Team Mach	1	0	0	0	0	0	NC
2019	Super Taikyu – ST-3	Tracy Sports	5	2	0	0	5	112.5‡	**3rd‡**
2020	Super GT – GT300	Advics muta Racing INGING	8	0	2	0	2	34	9th
2020	Formula Regional Japanese Championship	Field Motorsport	3	0	0	0	0	26	13th
2020	Super Taikyu – ST-1	Tracy Sports	2	0	0	0	2	50‡	**2nd‡**
2021	Super GT – GT300	muta Racing INGING	8	1	0	1	1	23	11th
2021	Super Taikyu – ST-1	Tracy Sports	6	2	2	1	6	124‡	**2nd‡**
2022	Super GT – GT300	Arnage Racing	8	0	0	0	0	4	29th
2022	Super Taikyu – ST-3	Tracy Sports	5	2	2	0	3	99‡	**3rd‡**
2022	Super Taikyu – ST-5	Mazda Spirit Racing	1	0	0	0	0	5.5‡	13th‡
2022	Toyota Gazoo Racing GR86/BRZ Cup	T by Two CABANA Racing	6	0	0	0	0	1	23rd
2023	Super GT – GT300	Pacific Racing Team	7	0	0	0	0	0	NC
2023	GT World Challenge Asia – GT4 Silver-Am	Akiland Racing	6	0	1	1	5	94	**3rd**
2023	SRO Japan Cup – GT4	Akiland Racing	6	1	1	0	5	87	**3rd**
2023	Super Taikyu – ST-Q	Mazda Spirit Racing	5	0	??	??	??	0‡	NC‡
2023	Super Taikyu – ST-4	Over Drive	1	0	0	0	0	70‡	5th‡
2024	Super GT – GT300	Pacific Racing Team	8	0	0	0	0	0	NC
2024	Super Taikyu – ST-Q	Mazda Spirit Racing	5	1	0	0	2	0‡	NC‡
2024	SRO Japan Cup – GT4 Silver-Am	K-tunes Racing	2	0	0	0	0	22	11th
2025	Super GT – GT300	Pacific Racing Team	6	0	0	0	0	12.5	26th
2025	Super Taikyu – ST-Q	Mazda Spirit Racing	3	0	0	0	0	0‡	NC‡
2026	Super Taikyu – ST-Q	Mazda Spirit Racing						‡	‡

‡ Team standings

=== Complete Japanese Formula 3 results ===
(key) (Races in bold indicate pole position) (Races in italics indicate fastest lap)

Year	Team	Engine	Class	1	2	3	4	5	6	7	8	9	10	11	12	13	14	15	DC	Pts
1997	Akiland Racing	Toyota		SUZ1; 9	TSU; 13	MIN; Ret	FUJ; 1	SUZ2; Ret	SUG	SEN	MOT	FUJ2	SUZ3; 12						NC	0
2012	CMS Motor Sports Project	Toyota	N	SUZ; 1; 8	SUZ; 2; 12	MOT; 1	MOT; 2	FUJ; 1	FUJ; 2	MOT; 1	MOT; 2	OKA; 1	OKA; 2	SUG; 1	SUG; 2	SUG; 3	FUJ; 1	FUJ; 2	8th	6

=== Complete Super GT results ===
Year	Team	Car	Class	1	2	3	4	5	6	7	8	9	DC	Points
2006	910 Racing With Team Ishimatsu	Porsche 996 GT3 RSR	GT300	SUZ	OKA	FUJ	SEP	SUG	SUZ; 12	MOT	AUT	FUJ; 18	33rd	4
2007	Yokoyama Racing	Vemac RD320R	GT300	SUZ; 15	OKA	FUJ; 7							25th	5
2007	Team Uematsu	Vemac RD320R	GT300				SEP	SUG; 16	SUZ; 10	MOT	AUT	FUJ; 13	25th	5
2008	Team Uematsu Nova	Vemac RD320R	GT300	SUZ; 8	OKA; 13	FUJ; 8	SEP; 4	SUG; 8	SUZ; Ret	MOT; 15	AUT; 7	FUJ; 8	17th	24
2010	R'Qs Motorsports	Vemac RD350R	GT300	SUZ	OKA	FUJ	SEP	SUG	SUZ; 13	FUJ	MOT		NC	0
2012	JLOC	Lamborghini Gallardo RG-3	GT300	OKA	FUJ; Ret	SEP	SUG	SUZ; 10	FUJ	AUT	MOT		26th	2
2013	Arnage Racing	Aston Martin V12 Vantage GT3	GT300	OKA	FUJ; Ret	SEP	SUG	SUZ; 8	FUJ	FUJ	AUT	MOT	24th	4
2015	Pacific Racing Team	McLaren MP4-12C GT3	GT300	OKA	FUJ	CHA	FUJ; 16	SUZ; 22	SUG; 23	AUT; 20	MOT; Ret		NC	0
2016	Gulf Racing with Pacific	Porsche 911 GT3R	GT300	OKA; DNS	FUJ; Ret	SUG; 13	FUJ; 21	SUZ; 13	BUR; 17	MOT; 22	MOT; 8		23rd	3
2017	EIcars Bentley TTO	Bentley Continental GT3	GT300	OKA; 20	FUJ; 16	AUT; 19	SUG	FUJ; 18	SUZ; Ret	CHA	MOT; 22		NC	0
2018	EIcars Bentley	Bentley Continental GT3	GT300	OKA; 21	FUJ; 22	SUZ; 18	CHA	FUJ; 13	SUG; 15	AUT; 18	MOT; 19		NC	0
2019	Team Mach	Toyota 86 MC GT300	GT300	OKA	FUJ	SUZ	CHA	FUJ; 17	AUT	SUG	MOT		NC	0
2020	Advics muta Racing INGING	Toyota 86 MC GT300	GT300	FUJ; 14	**FUJ**; 9	SUZ; 13	MOT; 16	**FUJ**; 7	SUZ; 2	MOT; 22	FUJ; 3		9th	34
2021	muta Racing INGING	Lotus Evora MC GT300	GT300	OKA; Ret	FUJ; 10	SUZ; 9	MOT; 1	SUG; 16	AUT; 18	MOT; 24	FUJ; 12		11th	23
2022	Arnage Racing	Toyota 86 MC GT300	GT300	OKA; 16	FUJ; 25	SUZ; 20	FUJ; 7	SUZ; 23	SUG; 22	AUT; 21	MOT; 16		29th	4
2023	Pacific Racing Team	Mercedes-AMG GT3 Evo	GT300	OKA; 23†	FUJ; WD	SUZ; 25	FUJ; 22	SUZ; 11	SUG; 17	AUT; 23	MOT; 19		NC	0
2024	Pacific Racing Team	Mercedes-AMG GT3 Evo	GT300	OKA; 21	FUJ; 12	SUZ; 17	FUJ; Ret	SUZ; 14	SUG; 20	AUT; Ret	MOT; 17		NC	0
2025	Pacific Racing Team	Mercedes-AMG GT3 Evo	GT300	OKA; 5	FUJ; 18	SEP	FS1; 22	FS2 (13)	SUZ; 21	SUG; 16	AUT; 23	MOT	26th	12.5

^{‡} Half points awarded as less than 75% of race distance was completed.
^{(Number)} Driver did not take part in this sprint race, points are still awarded for the teammate's result.
^{*} Season still in progress.

=== Complete Asian Le Mans Series results ===
(key) (Races in bold indicate pole position) (Races in italics indicate fastest lap)

Year	Team	Class	Car	Engine	1	2	3	4	Pos.	Points
2013	AAI-Rstrada	LMGTE	Porsche 997 GT3-RSR	Porsche 4.0 L Flat-6	INJ	FUJ	ZHU	SEP; 3	3rd	18
2014	AAI-Rstrada	GT	BMW Z4 GT3	BMW 4.4 L V8	INJ; 1		SHA	SEP; 3	3rd	58
2014	AAI-Rstrada	GT	Nissan GT-R GT3	Nissan 3.8 L V6		FUJ; 2			3rd	58
2015–16	Team AAI	LMP3	ADESS-03	Nissan VK50 5.0 L V8	FUJ; Ret	SEP	BUR; 2	SEP	4th	18
2016–17	Fist-Team AAI	LMP3	ADESS-03	Nissan VK50 5.0 L V8	ZHU	FUJ	BUR	SEP; Ret	17th	0

=== Complete Formula Regional Japanese Championship results ===
(key) (Races in bold indicate pole position) (Races in italics indicate fastest lap)

Year	Entrant	1	2	3	4	5	6	7	8	9	10	11	12	13	14	Pos	Points
2020	Field Racing	FUJ1; 1; 5	FUJ1; 2; 6	FUJ1; 3; 6	SUG; 1	SUG; 2	SUG; 3	FUJ2; 1	FUJ2; 2	MOT; 1	MOT; 2	OKA; 1	OKA; 2	AUT; 1	AUT; 2	13th	26

=== Complete GT World Challenge Asia results ===
(key) (Races in bold indicate pole position) (Races in italics indicate fastest lap)

Year	Team	Car	Class	1	2	3	4	5	6	7	8	9	10	11	12	DC	Points
2023	Akiland Racing	Toyota GR Supra GT4	GT4 Silver-Am	BUR; 1	BUR; 2	FSW; 1; 30	FSW; 2; 27	SUZ; 1; 31	SUZ; 2 Ret	MOT; 1	MOT; 2	OKA; 1; 2	OKA; 2; 4	SEP; 1	SEP; 2	4th	87
