= 2014 3 Hours of Inje =

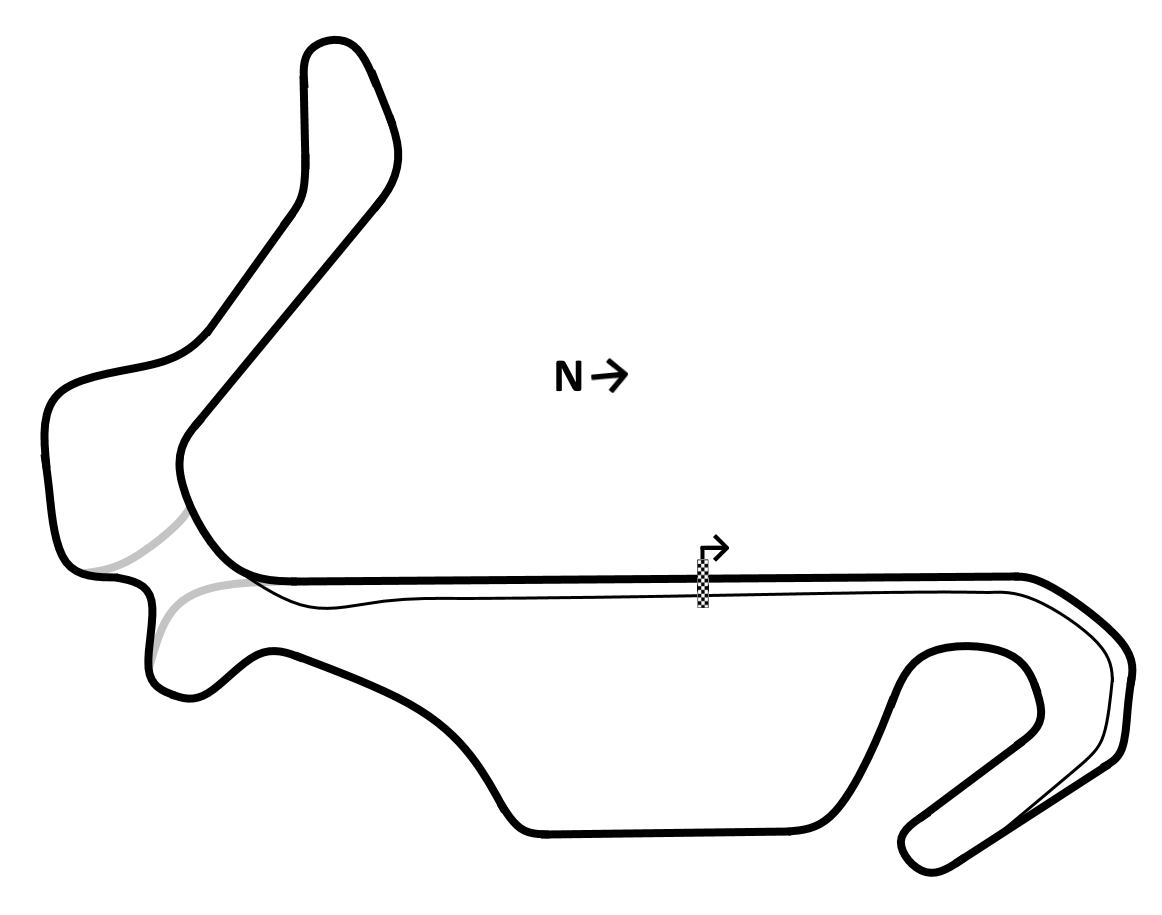
Track map of the Inje Speedium

The 2014 3 Hours of Inje was an endurance motor race held at the Inje Speedium in Inje County, South Korea on 18–20 July 2014. The race was the first round of the 2014 Asian Le Mans Series season. Defending series champions David Cheng and Ho-Pin Tung of OAK Racing Team Total won the race overall after their LMP2 class competitors Eurasia Motorsport crashed in the closing stages of the race. Mathias Beche, Kevin Tse, and Frank Yu of Craft-Bamboo Racing won the first race for the CN category in the Asian Le Mans Series, while AAI-Rstrada had a 1–2–3 finish in the GT category, led by Hanchen Chen, Ryohei Sakaguchi, and Marco Seefried.

== Race result ==
Race result is as follows. Class winners in bold.

Pos	Class	No	Team	Drivers	Chassis	Tyre	Laps
Pos	Class	No	Team	Drivers	Engine	Tyre	Laps
1	**LMP2**	**1**	**(France) OAK Racing Team Total**	**(United States) David Cheng (China) Ho-Pin Tung**	**Morgan LMP2**	MI	**121**
1	**LMP2**	**1**	**(France) OAK Racing Team Total**	**(United States) David Cheng (China) Ho-Pin Tung**	**Judd HK 3.6 L V8**	MI	**121**
2	**GT**	**92**	**(Taiwan) AAI-Rstrada**	**(Taiwan) Hanchen Chen (Japan) Ryohei Sakaguchi (Germany) Marco Seefried**	**BMW Z4 GT3**	MI	**111**
2	**GT**	**92**	**(Taiwan) AAI-Rstrada**	**(Taiwan) Hanchen Chen (Japan) Ryohei Sakaguchi (Germany) Marco Seefried**	**BMW 4.4 L V8**	MI	**111**
3	GT	90	(Taiwan) AAI-Rstrada	(China) Yu Lam (Japan) Takamitsu Matsui (Japan) Takeshi Tsuchiya	Mercedes-Benz SLS AMG GT3	MI	111
3	GT	90	(Taiwan) AAI-Rstrada	(China) Yu Lam (Japan) Takamitsu Matsui (Japan) Takeshi Tsuchiya	Mercedes-Benz 6.2 L V8	MI	111
4	GT	91	(Taiwan) AAI-Rstrada	(United Kingdom) Ollie Millroy (Taiwan) Jun San Chen (Japan) Tatsuya Tanigawa	BMW Z4 GT3	MI	110
4	GT	91	(Taiwan) AAI-Rstrada	(United Kingdom) Ollie Millroy (Taiwan) Jun San Chen (Japan) Tatsuya Tanigawa	BMW 4.4 L V8	MI	110
DNF	LMP2	27	(Philippines) Eurasia Motorsport	(United Kingdom) Richard Bradley (United Kingdom) John Hartshorne (South Korea) Tacksung Kim	Oreca 03	MI	96
DNF	LMP2	27	(Philippines) Eurasia Motorsport	(United Kingdom) Richard Bradley (United Kingdom) John Hartshorne (South Korea) Tacksung Kim	Nissan VK45DE 4.5 L V8	MI	96
6	**CN**	**77**	**(Hong Kong) Craft-Bamboo Racing**	**(Switzerland) Mathias Beche (Macau) Kevin Tse (Hong Kong) Frank Yu**	**Ligier JS53**	MI	**89**
6	**CN**	**77**	**(Hong Kong) Craft-Bamboo Racing**	**(Switzerland) Mathias Beche (Macau) Kevin Tse (Hong Kong) Frank Yu**	**Honda 2.0 L I4**	MI	**89**
DNS	GT	7	(China) Python	(China) Zou Si Rui (China) Xu Wei	Ferrari 458 Italia GT3	MI	–
DNS	GT	7	(China) Python	(China) Zou Si Rui (China) Xu Wei	Ferrari F142 4.5 L V8	MI	–
DNS	CN	45	(Canada) ATL Wolf Asia	(Malaysia) Dominic Ang (Malaysia) Gilbert Ang	Wolf GB08	MI	–
DNS	CN	45	(Canada) ATL Wolf Asia	(Malaysia) Dominic Ang (Malaysia) Gilbert Ang	Honda 2.0 L I4	MI	–

Asian Le Mans Series
Previous race: None	2014 season	Next race: 3 Hours of Fuji
