= 2019 Blancpain GT World Challenge Asia =

The 2019 GT World Challenge Asia (known for sponsorship reasons as the 2019 Blancpain GT World Challenge Asia) was the third season of the GT World Challenge Asia, an auto racing series for grand tourer cars in Asia co-promoted by the SRO Motorsports Group and Team Asia One GT Management. The races were contested with GT3-spec and GT4-spec cars. The season began on 6 April at Sepang and ended on 28 September at Shanghai. It was the first season of the unification of GT3 sprint series across the globe under the World Challenge name.

== Calendar ==
At the annual press conference during the 2018 24 Hours of Spa on 27 July, the Stéphane Ratel Organisation announced the first draft of the 2019 calendar. Ningbo was replaced by Korea. The dates for the races at Shanghai were confirmed on 11 December.

Round	Circuit	Date
1	Sepang International Circuit, Sepang, Malaysia	6–7 April
2	Chang International Circuit, Buriram, Thailand	11–12 May
3	Suzuka International Circuit, Suzuka, Japan	22–23 June
4	Fuji Speedway, Oyama, Japan	6–7 July
5	Korea International Circuit, Yeongam, South Korea	3–4 August
6	Shanghai International Circuit, Jiading, China	27–28 September

== Entry list ==
=== GT3 ===
Team	Car	No.	Drivers	Class	Rounds
(China) Zun Motorsport Crew	Mercedes-AMG GT3	4	(Australia) Josh Burdon	S	6
(China) Zun Motorsport Crew	Mercedes-AMG GT3	4	(Hong Kong) Adderly Fong	S	6
(China) Zun Motorsport Crew	Mercedes-AMG GT3	7	(China) Ka Chun Ma	Am	6
(China) Zun Motorsport Crew	Mercedes-AMG GT3	7	(China) Yi Ming Lin	Am	6
(China) Phantom Pro Racing	Mercedes-AMG GT3	5	(China) Chris On Chia	Am	6
(China) Phantom Pro Racing	Mercedes-AMG GT3	5	(China) Lu Wei	Am	6
(Japan) ARN Racing	Porsche 911 GT3 R	8	(Japan) Yuta Kamimura	PA	1–4, 6
(Japan) ARN Racing	Porsche 911 GT3 R	8	(Japan) Hiroaki Nagai	PA	1–4, 6
(China) Audi Sport Asia Team Absolute Racing (Note: Car No. 12 and 13 entered as Audi Sport Asia Team Absolute Racing under Chinese licence, car No. 26 entered as B-Quik Racing under Thai licence, car No. 59 entered as Singha Plan-B by Absolute Racing under Thai licence, cars No. 911 and 912 entered as Absolute Racing under Chinese licence and car No. 918 entered as Panther / AAS Motorsport under Thai licence.) (Thailand) B-Quik Racing (Thailand) Singha Plan-B by Absolute Racing (China) Absolute Racing (Thailand) Panther / AAS Motorsport	Audi R8 LMS Evo	12	(Estonia) Martin Rump	S	All
(China) Audi Sport Asia Team Absolute Racing (Thailand) B-Quik Racing (Thailand) Singha Plan-B by Absolute Racing (China) Absolute Racing (Thailand) Panther / AAS Motorsport	Audi R8 LMS Evo	12	(Malaysia) Weiron Tan	S	All
(China) Audi Sport Asia Team Absolute Racing (Thailand) B-Quik Racing (Thailand) Singha Plan-B by Absolute Racing (China) Absolute Racing (Thailand) Panther / AAS Motorsport	Audi R8 LMS Evo	13	(China) Congfu Cheng	PA	All
(China) Audi Sport Asia Team Absolute Racing (Thailand) B-Quik Racing (Thailand) Singha Plan-B by Absolute Racing (China) Absolute Racing (Thailand) Panther / AAS Motorsport	Audi R8 LMS Evo	13	(China) Jingzu Sun	PA	All
(China) Audi Sport Asia Team Absolute Racing (Thailand) B-Quik Racing (Thailand) Singha Plan-B by Absolute Racing (China) Absolute Racing (Thailand) Panther / AAS Motorsport	Audi R8 LMS Evo	26	(Australia) Daniel Bilski (Note: Bilski is an Australian driver who competed under a Hong Kong licence at round 1 and an Australian licence at round 2.)	Am	1–2
(China) Audi Sport Asia Team Absolute Racing (Thailand) B-Quik Racing (Thailand) Singha Plan-B by Absolute Racing (China) Absolute Racing (Thailand) Panther / AAS Motorsport	Audi R8 LMS Evo	26	(Netherlands) Henk Kiks (Note: Kiks is a Dutch driver who competed under a Thai licence at round 1 and a Dutch licence at round 2.)	Am	1–2
(China) Audi Sport Asia Team Absolute Racing (Thailand) B-Quik Racing (Thailand) Singha Plan-B by Absolute Racing (China) Absolute Racing (Thailand) Panther / AAS Motorsport	Audi R8 LMS Evo	59	(Thailand) Bhurit Bhirombhakdi	PA	1–3
(China) Audi Sport Asia Team Absolute Racing (Thailand) B-Quik Racing (Thailand) Singha Plan-B by Absolute Racing (China) Absolute Racing (Thailand) Panther / AAS Motorsport	Audi R8 LMS Evo	59	(Thailand) Kantasak Kusiri	PA	1–3
(China) Audi Sport Asia Team Absolute Racing (Thailand) B-Quik Racing (Thailand) Singha Plan-B by Absolute Racing (China) Absolute Racing (Thailand) Panther / AAS Motorsport	Porsche 911 GT3 R	911	(Germany) Philip Hamprecht	S	All
(China) Audi Sport Asia Team Absolute Racing (Thailand) B-Quik Racing (Thailand) Singha Plan-B by Absolute Racing (China) Absolute Racing (Thailand) Panther / AAS Motorsport	Porsche 911 GT3 R	911	(Thailand) Tanart Sathienthirakul	S	All
(China) Audi Sport Asia Team Absolute Racing (Thailand) B-Quik Racing (Thailand) Singha Plan-B by Absolute Racing (China) Absolute Racing (Thailand) Panther / AAS Motorsport	Porsche 911 GT3 R	912	(Norway) Dennis Olsen	PA	1
(China) Audi Sport Asia Team Absolute Racing (Thailand) B-Quik Racing (Thailand) Singha Plan-B by Absolute Racing (China) Absolute Racing (Thailand) Panther / AAS Motorsport	Porsche 911 GT3 R	912	(China) Bo Yuan	PA	1
(China) Audi Sport Asia Team Absolute Racing (Thailand) B-Quik Racing (Thailand) Singha Plan-B by Absolute Racing (China) Absolute Racing (Thailand) Panther / AAS Motorsport	Porsche 911 GT3 R	912	(China) Bo Yuan	S	2–6
(China) Audi Sport Asia Team Absolute Racing (Thailand) B-Quik Racing (Thailand) Singha Plan-B by Absolute Racing (China) Absolute Racing (Thailand) Panther / AAS Motorsport	Porsche 911 GT3 R	912	(New Zealand) Jono Lester	S	2
(China) Audi Sport Asia Team Absolute Racing (Thailand) B-Quik Racing (Thailand) Singha Plan-B by Absolute Racing (China) Absolute Racing (Thailand) Panther / AAS Motorsport	Porsche 911 GT3 R	912	(China) Leo Ye	S	3–6
(China) Audi Sport Asia Team Absolute Racing (Thailand) B-Quik Racing (Thailand) Singha Plan-B by Absolute Racing (China) Absolute Racing (Thailand) Panther / AAS Motorsport	Porsche 911 GT3 R	918	(Thailand) Vutthikorn Inthraphuvasak	PA	All
(China) Audi Sport Asia Team Absolute Racing (Thailand) B-Quik Racing (Thailand) Singha Plan-B by Absolute Racing (China) Absolute Racing (Thailand) Panther / AAS Motorsport	Porsche 911 GT3 R	918	(Switzerland) Alexandre Imperatori (Note: Imperatori is a Swiss driver who competed under a Hong Kong licence at round 1 and a Swiss licence at round 2.)	PA	1–2, 4–6
(China) Audi Sport Asia Team Absolute Racing (Thailand) B-Quik Racing (Thailand) Singha Plan-B by Absolute Racing (China) Absolute Racing (Thailand) Panther / AAS Motorsport	Porsche 911 GT3 R	918	(Germany) Marco Holzer	PA	3
(Hong Kong) / Modena Motorsports (Note: Car No. 16 entered as Modena Motorsports and car No. 21 entered as OpenRoad Racing.); (Hong Kong) / OpenRoad Racing	Porsche 911 GT3 R	16	(Hong Kong) John Shen	PA	1–2
(Hong Kong) / Modena Motorsports; (Hong Kong) / OpenRoad Racing	Porsche 911 GT3 R	16	(Switzerland) Mathias Beche	PA	1
(Hong Kong) / Modena Motorsports; (Hong Kong) / OpenRoad Racing	Porsche 911 GT3 R	16	(Denmark) Benny Simonsen	PA	2
(Hong Kong) / Modena Motorsports; (Hong Kong) / OpenRoad Racing	Porsche 911 GT3 R	21	(Indonesia) Michael Soeryadjaya	Am	1
(Hong Kong) / Modena Motorsports; (Hong Kong) / OpenRoad Racing	Porsche 911 GT3 R	21	(Netherlands) Francis Tjia	Am	1
(Hong Kong) / Modena Motorsports; (Hong Kong) / OpenRoad Racing	Porsche 911 GT3 R	21	(Netherlands) Francis Tjia	PA	2
(Hong Kong) / Modena Motorsports; (Hong Kong) / OpenRoad Racing	Porsche 911 GT3 R	21	(Hong Kong) Philippe Descombes	PA	2
(China) Anstone Racing	Mercedes-AMG GT3	17	(China) Wei Xu	PA	1–4, 6
(China) Anstone Racing	Mercedes-AMG GT3	17	(Japan) Naoki Yokomizo	PA	1–4, 6
(Chinese Taipei) HubAuto Corsa	Ferrari 488 GT3	27	(Japan) Yuya Sakamoto	S	All
(Chinese Taipei) HubAuto Corsa	Ferrari 488 GT3	27	(Australia) David Russell	S	1
(Chinese Taipei) HubAuto Corsa	Ferrari 488 GT3	27	(New Zealand) Andre Heimgartner	S	2–3
(Chinese Taipei) HubAuto Corsa	Ferrari 488 GT3	27	(Germany) Marco Seefried	S	4
(Chinese Taipei) HubAuto Corsa	Ferrari 488 GT3	27	(Brazil) Marcos Gomes	S	5–6
(Chinese Taipei) HubAuto Corsa	Ferrari 488 GT3	28	(Chinese Taipei) Morris Chen	Am	1
(Chinese Taipei) HubAuto Corsa	Ferrari 488 GT3	28	(Indonesia) Andrew Haryanto	Am	1
(Australia) AMAC Motorsport	Lamborghini Huracán GT3 Evo	51	(Australia) Andrew Macpherson	Am	All
(Australia) AMAC Motorsport	Lamborghini Huracán GT3 Evo	51	(Australia) William Ben Porter	Am	All
(Hong Kong) Craft-Bamboo Racing	Mercedes-AMG GT3	55	(Singapore) Daniel Au	PA	All
(Hong Kong) Craft-Bamboo Racing	Mercedes-AMG GT3	55	(Malaysia) Melvin Moh	PA	All
(Hong Kong) Craft-Bamboo Racing	Mercedes-AMG GT3	88	(Chinese Taipei) Jeffrey Lee	PA	All
(Hong Kong) Craft-Bamboo Racing	Mercedes-AMG GT3	88	(Belgium) Alessio Picariello	PA	1–4, 6
(Hong Kong) Craft-Bamboo Racing	Mercedes-AMG GT3	88	(Germany) Maximilian Götz	PA	5
(Hong Kong) Craft-Bamboo Racing	Mercedes-AMG GT3	99	(Denmark) Christina Nielsen	S	All
(Hong Kong) Craft-Bamboo Racing	Mercedes-AMG GT3	99	(Hong Kong) Darryl O'Young	S	All
(Japan) LM Corsa	Porsche 911 GT3 R	60	(Japan) Kei Nakanishi	Am	3–4
(Japan) LM Corsa	Porsche 911 GT3 R	60	(Japan) Shigekazu Wakisaka	Am	3–4
(Japan) ABSSA Motorsport	McLaren 720S GT3	61	(Thailand) Piti Bhirombhakdi	PA	All
(Japan) ABSSA Motorsport	McLaren 720S GT3	61	(Japan) Keita Sawa	PA	All
(Chinese Taipei) Team iRace.Win	Mercedes-AMG GT3	66	(China) Nan Lin	Am	6
(Chinese Taipei) Team iRace.Win	Mercedes-AMG GT3	66	(China) Heng Min	Am	6
(Singapore) T2 Motorsports	Ferrari 488 GT3	75	(Indonesia) Rio Haryanto	PA	All
(Singapore) T2 Motorsports	Ferrari 488 GT3	75	(Indonesia) David Tjiptobiantoro	PA	1–2, 4–6
(Singapore) T2 Motorsports	Ferrari 488 GT3	75	(Singapore) Gregory Teo	PA	3
(Hong Kong) X Works	Audi R8 LMS	83	(Hong Kong) Philip Tang	PA	4
(Hong Kong) X Works	Audi R8 LMS	83	(Hong Kong) Shaun Thong	PA	4
(South Korea) Solite Indigo Racing	Mercedes-AMG GT3	97	(South Korea) Roelof Bruins	S	All
(South Korea) Solite Indigo Racing	Mercedes-AMG GT3	97	(Italy) Gabriele Piana	S	1
(South Korea) Solite Indigo Racing	Mercedes-AMG GT3	97	(Germany) Manuel Metzger	S	2, 4–6
(South Korea) Solite Indigo Racing	Mercedes-AMG GT3	97	(Switzerland) Patric Niederhauser	S	3
(Malaysia) Arrows Racing	Honda NSX GT3	98	(Macau) Lic Ka Liu	Am	1
(Malaysia) Arrows Racing	Honda NSX GT3	98	(Hong Kong) Philip Ma	Am	1
(Thailand) Vattana Motorsport	Lamborghini Huracán GT3 Evo	128	(Japan) Akihiro Asai	Am	2–5
(Thailand) Vattana Motorsport	Lamborghini Huracán GT3 Evo	128	(Thailand) Chonsawat Asavahame	Am	2–5
(Japan) Kizashi Koshido Saccess Racing	Lamborghini Huracán GT3	390	(Japan) Tamotsu Kondo	Am	4
(Japan) Kizashi Koshido Saccess Racing	Lamborghini Huracán GT3	390	(Japan) Motoharu Sato	Am	4
(Italy) Vincenzo Sospiri Racing	Lamborghini Huracán GT3 Evo	666	(Hong Kong) Alex Au	PA	All
(Italy) Vincenzo Sospiri Racing	Lamborghini Huracán GT3 Evo	666	(Denmark) Frederik Schandorff	PA	All
(Japan) CarGuy Racing	Ferrari 488 GT3	777	(Japan) Takeshi Kimura	Am	4
(Japan) CarGuy Racing	Ferrari 488 GT3	777	(Japan) Yusuke Yamasaki	Am	4
Triple Eight Race Engineering Australia	Mercedes-AMG GT3	888	(Malaysia) Prince Abdul Rahman Ibrahim	PA	All
Triple Eight Race Engineering Australia	Mercedes-AMG GT3	888	(Malaysia) Jazeman Jaafar	PA	1–2, 4
Triple Eight Race Engineering Australia	Mercedes-AMG GT3	888	(New Zealand) Shane van Gisbergen	PA	3, 5–6
(China) JRM	Porsche 911 GT3 R	910	(New Zealand) Chris van der Drift	PA	All
(China) JRM	Porsche 911 GT3 R	910	(China) Chao Li	PA	1-4, 6
(China) JRM	Porsche 911 GT3 R	910	(China) Anthony Liu	PA	5
(China) Audi Sport Asia Team TSRT	Audi R8 LMS Evo	999	(China) Weian Chen	S	All
(China) Audi Sport Asia Team TSRT	Audi R8 LMS Evo	999	(Macau) André Couto	S	1–3
(China) Audi Sport Asia Team TSRT	Audi R8 LMS Evo	999	(Switzerland) Rahel Frey	S	4–6

Icon	Class
S	Silver Cup
PA	Pro-Am Cup
Am	Am Cup

=== GT4 ===
Team	Car	No.	Drivers	Class	Rounds
(Japan) GTO Racing with TTR	Mercedes-AMG GT4	11	(Hong Kong) Tony Fong	Am	All
(Japan) GTO Racing with TTR	Mercedes-AMG GT4	11	(Chinese Taipei) Brian Lee	Am	All
(Japan) Birth Racing Project	Mercedes-AMG GT4	19	(Japan) Kouichi Okumura	Am	4
(Japan) Birth Racing Project	Mercedes-AMG GT4	19	(Japan) Daisuke Yamawaki	Am	4
(Hong Kong) Craft-Bamboo Racing	Mercedes-AMG GT4	77	(France) Jean-Marc Merlin	Am	1–4, 6
(Hong Kong) Craft-Bamboo Racing	Mercedes-AMG GT4	77	(Hong Kong) Frank Yu	Am	1–3, 5
(Hong Kong) Craft-Bamboo Racing	Mercedes-AMG GT4	77	(Hong Kong) David Pun	Am	4
(Hong Kong) Craft-Bamboo Racing	Mercedes-AMG GT4	77	(Singapore) Richard Wee	Am	5
(Hong Kong) Craft-Bamboo Racing	Mercedes-AMG GT4	77	(Malaysia) Douglas Khoo	Am	6
Racing Spirit Thailand	Porsche Cayman GT4 Clubsport MR	80	(Thailand) Munkong Sathienthirakul	Am	2
Racing Spirit Thailand	Porsche Cayman GT4 Clubsport MR	80	(Thailand) Preeda Tantemsapya	Am	2
(Japan) BMW Team Studie	BMW M4 GT4	81	(Japan) Takayuki Kinoshita	Am	All
(Japan) BMW Team Studie	BMW M4 GT4	81	(Japan) Jukuchou Sunako	Am	1–5
(Japan) BMW Team Studie	BMW M4 GT4	82	(Japan) Masahiko Ida	Am	4
(Japan) BMW Team Studie	BMW M4 GT4	82	(Japan) Shinsuke Umeda	Am	4
(Japan) BMW Team Studie	BMW M4 GT4	82	(Japan) Jukuchou Sunako	Am	6
(China) Absolute Racing	Audi R8 LMS GT4	89	(Indonesia) Anderson Tanoto	Am	3
(China) Absolute Racing	Audi R8 LMS GT4	89	(Australia) Mark Williamson	Am	3
(Chinese Taipei) Team iRace.Win	Mercedes-AMG GT4	111	(Singapore) Ringo Chong	Am	All
(Chinese Taipei) Team iRace.Win	Mercedes-AMG GT4	111	(Indonesia) Setiawan Santoso	Am	All
(Chinese Taipei) Team iRace.Win	Mercedes-AMG GT4	199	(Australia) Alan Yeo	Am	1–3
(Chinese Taipei) Team iRace.Win	Mercedes-AMG GT4	199	(China) Ran Zhang	Am	1
(Chinese Taipei) Team iRace.Win	Mercedes-AMG GT4	199	(Italy) Angelo Negro	Am	2
(Chinese Taipei) Team iRace.Win	Mercedes-AMG GT4	199	(Chinese Taipei) Keo Chang	Am	3–6
(Chinese Taipei) Team iRace.Win	Mercedes-AMG GT4	199	(Chinese Taipei) Joe Chi	Am	4–6

== Race results ==
Bold indicates overall winner.

Round		Circuit	Pole position	Silver Winners	Pro-Am Winners	Am Winners	GT4 Winners
1	R1	(Malaysia) Sepang	(China) No. 912 Absolute Racing	(South Korea) No. 97 Solite Indigo Racing	**(Hong Kong) No. 88 Craft-Bamboo Racing**	(Australia) No. 51 AMAC Motorsport	(Japan) No. 81 BMW Team Studie
1	R1	(Malaysia) Sepang	(Norway) Dennis Olsen (China) Bo Yuan	(South Korea) Roelof Bruins (Italy) Gabriele Piana	**(Chinese Taipei) Jeffrey Lee** **(Belgium) Alessio Picariello**	(Australia) Andrew Macpherson (Australia) William Ben Porter	(Japan) Takayuki Kinoshita (Japan) Jukuchou Sunako
1	R2	(Malaysia) Sepang	(China) No. 912 Absolute Racing	**(China) No. 911 Absolute Racing**	(Thailand) No. 918 Panther / AAS Motorsport	(Thailand) No. 26 B-Quik Racing	(Japan) No. 81 BMW Team Studie
1	R2	(Malaysia) Sepang	(Norway) Dennis Olsen (China) Bo Yuan	**(Germany) Philip Hamprecht** **(Thailand) Tanart Sathienthirakul**	(Switzerland) Alexandre Imperatori (Thailand) Vutthikorn Inthraphuvasak	(Australia) Daniel Bilski (Netherlands) Henk Kiks	(Japan) Takayuki Kinoshita (Japan) Jukuchou Sunako
2	R1	(Thailand) Buriram	(Hong Kong) No. 99 Craft-Bamboo Racing	**(South Korea) No. 97 Solite Indigo Racing**	(Italy) No. 666 Vincenzo Sospiri Racing	(Thailand) No. 128 Vattana Motorsport	(Hong Kong) No. 77 Craft-Bamboo Racing
2	R1	(Thailand) Buriram	(Denmark) Christina Nielsen (Hong Kong) Darryl O'Young	**(South Korea) Roelof Bruins** **(Germany) Manuel Metzger**	(Hong Kong) Alex Au (Denmark) Frederik Schandorff	(Japan) Akihiro Asai (Thailand) Chonsawat Asavahame	(France) Jean-Marc Merlin (Hong Kong) Frank Yu
2	R2	(Thailand) Buriram	(Hong Kong) No. 88 Craft-Bamboo Racing	(Chinese Taipei) No. 27 HubAuto Corsa	**(Thailand) No. 918 Panther / AAS Motorsport**	(Thailand) No. 26 B-Quik Racing	(Japan) No. 81 BMW Team Studie
2	R2	(Thailand) Buriram	(Taiwan) Jeffrey Lee (Belgium) Alessio Picariello	(New Zealand) Andre Heimgartner (Japan) Yuya Sakamoto	**(Switzerland) Alexandre Imperatori** **(Thailand) Vutthikorn Inthraphuvasak**	(Australia) Daniel Bilski (Netherlands) Henk Kiks	(Japan) Takayuki Kinoshita (Japan) Jukuchou Sunako
3	R1	(Japan) Suzuka	(China) No. 12 Audi Sport Asia Team Absolute Racing	**(China) No. 911 Absolute Racing**	(Japan) No. 8 ARN Racing	(Japan) No. 60 LM Corsa	(Chinese Taipei) No. 111 Team iRace.Win
3	R1	(Japan) Suzuka	(Estonia) Martin Rump (Malaysia) Weiron Tan	**(Germany) Philip Hamprecht** **(Thailand) Tanart Sathienthirakul**	(Japan) Yuta Kamimura (Japan) Hiroaki Nagai	(Japan) Kei Nakanishi (Japan) Shigekazu Wakisaka	(Singapore) Ringo Chong (Indonesia) Setiawan Santoso
3	R2	(Japan) Suzuka	(Hong Kong) No. 88 Craft-Bamboo Racing	(China) No. 911 Absolute Racing	**(Hong Kong) No. 88 Craft-Bamboo Racing**	(Thailand) No. 128 Vattana Motorsport	(Japan) No. 81 BMW Team Studie
3	R2	(Japan) Suzuka	(Chinese Taipei) Jeffrey Lee (Belgium) Alessio Picariello	(Germany) Philip Hamprecht (Thailand) Tanart Sathienthirakul	**(Chinese Taipei) Jeffrey Lee** **(Belgium) Alessio Picariello**	(Japan) Akihiro Asai (Thailand) Chonsawat Asavahame	(Japan) Takayuki Kinoshita (Japan) Jukuchou Sunako
4	R1	(Japan) Fuji	(China) No. 911 Absolute Racing	**(South Korea) No. 97 Solite Indigo Racing**	(Japan) No. 8 ARN Racing	(Australia) No. 51 AMAC Motorsport	(Hong Kong) No. 77 Craft-Bamboo Racing
4	R1	(Japan) Fuji	(Germany) Philip Hamprecht (Thailand) Tanart Sathienthirakul	**(South Korea) Roelof Bruins** **(Germany) Manuel Metzger**	(Japan) Yuta Kamimura (Japan) Hiroaki Nagai	(Australia) Andrew Macpherson (Australia) William Ben Porter	(France) Jean-Marc Merlin (Hong Kong) David Pun
4	R2	(Japan) Fuji	(China) No. 88 Craft-Bamboo Racing	**(China) No. 12 Audi Sport Asia Team Absolute Racing**	(Thailand) No. 918 Panther / AAS Motorsport	(Thailand) No. 128 Vattana Motorsport	(Japan) No. 81 BMW Team Studie
4	R2	(Japan) Fuji	(Chinese Taipei) Jeffrey Lee (Belgium) Alessio Picariello	**(Estonia) Martin Rump** **(Malaysia) Weiron Tan**	(Switzerland) Alexandre Imperatori (Thailand) Vutthikorn Inthraphuvasak	(Japan) Akihiro Asai (Thailand) Chonsawat Asavahame	(Japan) Takayuki Kinoshita (Japan) Jukuchou Sunako
5	R1	(South Korea) Korea	(South Korea) No. 97 Solite Indigo Racing	**(South Korea) No. 97 Solite Indigo Racing**	No. 888 Triple Eight Race Engineering Australia	(Australia) No. 51 AMAC Motorsport	(Hong Kong) No. 77 Craft-Bamboo Racing
5	R1	(South Korea) Korea	(South Korea) Roelof Bruins (Germany) Manuel Metzger	**(South Korea) Roelof Bruins** **(Germany) Manuel Metzger**	(Malaysia) Prince Abdul Rahman Ibrahim (New Zealand) Shane van Gisbergen	(Australia) Andrew Macpherson (Australia) William Ben Porter	(Hong Kong) Frank Yu (Singapore) Richard Wee
5	R2	(South Korea) Korea	No. 888 Triple Eight Race Engineering Australia	(China) No. 912 Absolute Racing	**(Thailand) No. 918 Panther / AAS Motorsport**	(Australia) No. 51 AMAC Motorsport	(Japan) No. 81 BMW Team Studie
5	R2	(South Korea) Korea	(Malaysia) Prince Abdul Rahman Ibrahim (New Zealand) Shane van Gisbergen	(China) Leo Ye (China) Bo Yuan	**(Switzerland) Alexandre Imperatori** **(Thailand) Vutthikorn Inthraphuvasak**	(Australia) Andrew Macpherson (Australia) William Ben Porter	(Japan) Takayuki Kinoshita (Japan) Jukuchou Sunako
6	R1	(China) Shanghai	(China) No. 12 Audi Sport Asia Team Absolute Racing	**(China) No. 12 Audi Sport Asia Team Absolute Racing**	(Thailand) No. 918 Panther / AAS Motorsport	(China) No. 5 Phantom Pro Racing	(Chinese Taipei) No. 111 Team iRace.Win
6	R1	(China) Shanghai	(Estonia) Martin Rump (Malaysia) Weiron Tan	**(Estonia) Martin Rump** **(Malaysia) Weiron Tan**	(Switzerland) Alexandre Imperatori (Thailand) Vutthikorn Inthraphuvasak	(China) Chris On Chia (China) Lu Wei	(Singapore) Ringo Chong (Indonesia) Setiawan Santoso
6	R2	(China) Shanghai	(China) No. 910 JRM (Note: The No. 8 ARN Racing Porsche took pole position, but crashed out of Race 1 and was unable to make the start of Race 2, elevating the No. 910 JRM Porsche to pole position.)	**(China) No. 912 Absolute Racing**	(Hong Kong) No. 88 Craft-Bamboo Racing	(China) No. 5 Phantom Pro Racing	(Japan) No. 82 BMW Team Studie
6	R2	(China) Shanghai	(New Zealand) Chris van der Drift (China) Chao Li	**(China) Leo Ye** **(China) Bo Yuan**	(Chinese Taipei) Jeffrey Lee (Belgium) Alessio Picariello	(China) Chris On Chia (China) Lu Wei	(Japan) Jukuchou Sunako

== Championship standings ==
Scoring system

Championship points are awarded for the first ten positions in each race. Entries are required to complete 75% of the winning car's race distance in order to be classified and earn points. Individual drivers are required to participate for a minimum of 25 minutes in order to earn championship points in any race.

Position	**1st**	**2nd**	**3rd**	**4th**	**5th**	**6th**	**7th**	**8th**	**9th**	**10th**
Points	25	18	15	12	10	8	6	4	2	1

=== Drivers' championships ===
==== Overall ====
Pos.	Driver	Team	SEP (Malaysia)		CHA (Thailand)		SUZ (Japan)		FUJ (Japan)		KOR (South Korea)		SHA (China)		Points
GT3
1	(South Korea) Roelof Bruins	(South Korea) Solite Indigo Racing	2	5	1	5	9	7	1	8	**1**	4	4	5	159
2	(Thailand) Vutthikorn Inthraphuvasak	(Thailand) Panther / AAS Motorsport	9	2	18	1	6	2	Ret	2	8	1	5	3	141
3	(Germany) Philip Hamprecht (Thailand) Tanart Sathienthirakul	(China) Absolute Racing	8	1	2	10	1	3	**4**	7	3	8	3	25	140
4	(Japan) Yuya Sakamoto	(Chinese Taipei) HubAuto Corsa	3	6	4	2	4	4	3	26	2	6	2	Ret	136
5	(Germany) Manuel Metzger	(South Korea) Solite Indigo Racing			1	5			1	8	**1**	4	4	5	123
6	(Switzerland) Alexandre Imperatori	(Thailand) Panther / AAS Motorsport	9	2	18	1			Ret	2	8	1	5	3	115
7	(Estonia) Martin Rump (Malaysia) Weiron Tan	(China) Audi Sport Asia Team Absolute Racing	16	4	3	Ret	**11**	5	2	1	6	9	**1**	13	115
8	(China) Bo Yuan	(China) Absolute Racing	**6**	**10**	5	DSQ	2	6	8	13	5	3	11	1	100
9	(China) Leo Ye	(China) Absolute Racing					2	6	8	13	5	3	11	1	81
10	(China) Weian Chen	(China) Audi Sport Asia Team TSRT	18	Ret	29	3	8	9	5	4	4	7	5	7	77
11	(Chinese Taipei) Jeffrey Lee	(Hong Kong) Craft-Bamboo Racing	1	20	13	**15**	16	**1**	16	**16**	Ret	12	14	2	68
11	(Belgium) Alessio Picariello	(Hong Kong) Craft-Bamboo Racing	1	20	13	**15**	16	**1**	16	**16**			14	2	68
12	(Hong Kong) Alex Au (Denmark) Frederik Schandorff	(Italy) Vincenzo Sospiri Racing	13	7	6	4	5	25	9	6	9	Ret	15	4	60
13	(Switzerland) Rahel Frey	(China) Audi Sport Asia Team TSRT							5	4	4	7	5	7	56
14	(New Zealand) Andre Heimgartner	(Chinese Taipei) HubAuto Corsa			4	2	4	4							54
15	(New Zealand) Chris van der Drift	(China) JRM	5	9	8	27	15	8	Ret	Ret	10	2	10	**6**	49
16	(Denmark) Christina Nielsen (Hong Kong) Darryl O'Young	(Hong Kong) Craft-Bamboo Racing	7	3	**12**	14	7	10	13	3	12	11	13	9	45
17	(Brazil) Marcos Gomes	(Chinese Taipei) HubAuto Corsa									2	6	2	Ret	44
18	(Malaysia) Prince Abdul Rahman Ibrahim	Triple Eight Race Engineering Australia	4	13	11	18	13	18	11	5	7	**5**	12	16	38
19	(China) Chao Li	(China) JRM	5	9	8	27	15	8	Ret	Ret			10	**6**	30
20	(Italy) Gabriele Piana	(South Korea) Solite Indigo Racing	2	5											28
21	(Germany) Marco Holzer	(Thailand) Panther / AAS Motorsport					6	2							26
22	(Japan) Yuta Kamimura (Japan) Hiroaki Nagai	(Japan) ARN Racing	28	12	14	19	3	12	6	9			Ret	DNS	25
23	(Australia) David Russell	(Chinese Taipei) HubAuto Corsa	3	6											23
24	(Malaysia) Jazeman Jaafar	Triple Eight Race Engineering Australia	4	13	11	18			11	5					22
25	(Macau) André Couto	(China) Audi Sport Asia Team TSRT	18	Ret	29	3	8	9							21
26	(Thailand) Piti Bhirombhakdi (Japan) Keita Sawa	(Japan) ABSSA Motorsport	Ret	15	20	8	10	13	7	10	11	10	7	10	20
27	(China) Anthony Liu	(China) JRM									10	2			19
28	(New Zealand) Shane van Gisbergen	Triple Eight Race Engineering Australia					13	18			7	**5**	12	16	16
29	(Germany) Marco Seefried	(Chinese Taipei) HubAuto Corsa							3	26					15
30	(Thailand) Bhurit Bhirombhakdi (Thailand) Kantasak Kusiri	(Thailand) Singha Plan-B by Absolute Racing	10	8	10	6	22	17							14
31	(Indonesia) Rio Haryanto	(Singapore) T2 Motorsports	17	18	7	16	18	16	10	Ret	Ret	13	16	8	11
31	(Indonesia) David Tjiptobiantoro	(Singapore) T2 Motorsports	17	18	7	16			10	Ret	Ret	13	16	8	11
32	(New Zealand) Jono Lester	(China) Absolute Racing			5	DSQ									10
33	(Norway) Dennis Olsen	(China) Absolute Racing	**6**	**10**											9
34	(Hong Kong) Francis Tjia	(Hong Kong) OpenRoad Racing	15	17	9	7									8
35	(Hong Kong) Philippe Descombes	(Hong Kong) OpenRoad Racing			9	7									8
35	(Switzerland) Patric Niederhauser	(South Korea) Solite Indigo Racing					9	7							8
36	(China) Congfu Cheng (China) Jingzu Sun	(China) Audi Sport Asia Team Absolute Racing	14	19	23	25	12	11	12	18	13	14	8	14	4
37	(Australia) Daniel Bilski (Netherlands) Henk Kiks	(Thailand) B-Quik Racing	Ret	16	21	9									2
	(Hong Kong) John Shen	(Hong Kong) Modena Motorsports	11	11	16	12									0
	(Japan) Akihiro Asai (Thailand) Chonsawat Asavahame	(Thailand) Vattana Motorsport			17	11	19	15	27	11	15	16			0
	(Switzerland) Mathias Beche	(Hong Kong) Modena Motorsports	11	11											0
	(China) Wei Xu (Japan) Naoki Yokomizo	(China) Anstone Racing	21	14	15	Ret	14	14	Ret	20			19	11	0
	(Australia) Andrew Macpherson (Australia) William Ben Porter	(Australia) AMAC Motorsport	12	24	19	13	21	19	14	15	14	15	18	15	0
	(Denmark) Benny Simonsen	(Hong Kong) Modena Motorsports			16	12									0
	(Japan) Kei Nakanishi (Japan) Shigekazu Wakisaka	(Japan) LM Corsa					17	Ret	20	12					0
	(Germany) Maximilian Götz	(Hong Kong) Craft-Bamboo Racing									Ret	12			0
	(Hong Kong) Philip Tang (Hong Kong) Shaun Thong	(Hong Kong) X Works							19	14					0
	(Indonesia) Michael Soeryadjaya	(Hong Kong) OpenRoad Racing	15	17											0
	(Japan) Takeshi Kimura (Japan) Yusuke Yamasaki	(Japan) CarGuy Racing							15	17					0
	(Singapore) Daniel Au (Malaysia) Melvin Moh	(Hong Kong) Craft-Bamboo Racing	20	22	22	17	20	21	17	Ret	16	17	21	18	0
	(Singapore) Gregory Teo	(Singapore) T2 Motorsports					18	16							0
	(Japan) Tamotsu Kondo (Japan) Motoharu Sato	(Japan) Kizashi Koshido Saccess Racing							18	19					0
	(Macau) Lic Ka Liu (Hong Kong) Philip Ma	(Malaysia) Arrows Racing	19	23											0
	(Chinese Taipei) Morris Chen (Australia) Andrew Haryanto	(Chinese Taipei) HubAuto Corsa	22	21											0
Entries ineligible to score points
	(Australia) Josh Burdon (Hong Kong) Adderly Fong	(China) Zun Motorsport Crew											9	Ret	
	(China) Chris On Chia (China) Lu Wei	(China) Phantom Pro Racing											17	12	
	(China) Nan Lin (China) Heng Min	(Chinese Taipei) Team iRace.Win											20	17	
	(China) Ka Chun Ma (China) Yi Ming Lin	(China) Zun Motorsport Crew											22	19	
GT4
1	(Japan) Jukuchou Sunako	(Japan) BMW Team Studie	**23**	**25**	**25**	20	**28**	**20**	**22**	**21**	**20**	18	24	**20**	249
2	(Japan) Takayuki Kinoshita	(Japan) BMW Team Studie	**23**	**25**	**25**	20	**28**	**20**	**22**	**21**	**20**	18	25	23	233
3	(Singapore) Ringo Chong (Indonesia) Setiawan Santoso	(Chinese Taipei) Team iRace.Win	25	27	27	**23**	23	Ret	23	23	18	**22**	23	21	180
4	(France) Jean-Marc Merlin	(Hong Kong) Craft-Bamboo Racing	26	26	24	22	26	23	21	25			27	Ret	142
5	(Hong Kong) Tony Fong (Chinese Taipei) Brian Lee	(Japan) GTO Racing with TTR	24	28	26	21	24	Ret	Ret	24	21	20	**28**	24	136
6	(Hong Kong) Frank Yu	(Hong Kong) Craft-Bamboo Racing	26	26	24	22	26	23			17	21			134
7	(Chinese Taipei) Keo Chang	(Chinese Taipei) Team iRace.Win					27	24	24	22	19	19	26	22	112
8	(Chinese Taipei) Joe Chi	(Chinese Taipei) Team iRace.Win							24	22	19	19	26	22	90
9	(Australia) Alan Yeo	(Chinese Taipei) Team iRace.Win	27	29	28	26	27	24							60
10	(Singapore) Richard Wee	(Hong Kong) Craft-Bamboo Racing									17	21			37
11	(Hong Kong) David Pun	(Hong Kong) Craft-Bamboo Racing							21	25					35
12	(Indonesia) Anderson Tanoto (Australia) Mark Williamson	(China) Absolute Racing					25	22							33
13	(China) Ran Zhang	(Chinese Taipei) Team iRace.Win	27	29											20
14	(Italy) Angelo Negro	(Chinese Taipei) Team iRace.Win			28	26									18
15	(Thailand) Munkong Sathienthirakul (Thailand) Preeda Tantemsapya	Racing Spirit Thailand			30	24									18
16	(Japan) Kouichi Okumura (Japan) Daisuke Yamawaki	(Japan) Birth Racing Project							25	Ret					10
17	(Malaysia) Douglas Khoo	(Hong Kong) Craft-Bamboo Racing											27	Ret	10
18	(Japan) Masahiko Ida (Japan) Shinsuke Umeda	(Japan) BMW Team Studie							26	Ret					8
Pos.	Driver	Team	SEP (Malaysia)		CHA (Thailand)		SUZ (Japan)		FUJ (Japan)		KOR (South Korea)		SHA (China)		Points

Key
Colour	Result
Gold	Race winner
Silver	2nd place
Bronze	3rd place
Green	Points finish
Blue	Non-points finish
Blue	Non-classified finish (NC)
Purple	Did not finish (Ret)
Black	Disqualified (DSQ)
Black	Excluded (EX)
White	Did not start (DNS)
White	Race cancelled (C)
White	Withdrew (WD)
Blank	Did not participate

**Bold** – Pole
Italics – Fastest Lap

==== Silver Cup ====
Pos.	Driver	Team	SEP (Malaysia)		CHA (Thailand)		SUZ (Japan)		FUJ (Japan)		KOR (South Korea)		SHA (China)		Points
1	(South Korea) Roelof Bruins	(South Korea) Solite Indigo Racing	2	5	1	5	9	7	1	8	**1**	**4**	4	5	203
2	(Germany) Philip Hamprecht (Thailand) Tanart Sathienthirakul	(China) Absolute Racing	**8**	1	2	10	1	**3**	**4**	7	3	8	3	25	189
3	(Japan) Yuya Sakamoto	(Chinese Taipei) HubAuto Corsa	3	6	4	2	4	4	3	26	2	6	2	Ret	170
4	(Estonia) Martin Rump (Malaysia) Weiron Tan	(China) Audi Sport Asia Team Absolute Racing	16	**4**	3	**Ret**	**11**	5	2	**1**	6	9	**1**	13	155
5	(Germany) Manuel Metzger	(South Korea) Solite Indigo Racing			1	5			1	8	**1**	**4**	4	5	148
6	(China) Bo Yuan	(China) Absolute Racing			5	DSQ	2	6	8	13	5	3	11	**1**	124
7	(China) Weian Chen	(China) Audi Sport Asia Team TSRT	18	Ret	29	3	8	9	5	4	4	7	5	7	124
8	(Denmark) Christina Nielsen (Hong Kong) Darryl O'Young	(Hong Kong) Craft-Bamboo Racing	7	3	**12**	14	7	10	13	3	12	11	13	9	123
9	(China) Leo Ye	(China) Absolute Racing					2	6	8	13	5	3	11	**1**	114
10	(Switzerland) Rahel Frey	(China) Audi Sport Asia Team TSRT							5	4	4	7	5	7	74
11	(New Zealand) Andre Heimgartner	(Chinese Taipei) HubAuto Corsa			4	2	4	4							70
12	(Brazil) Marcos Gomes	(Chinese Taipei) HubAuto Corsa									2	6	2	Ret	51
13	(Macau) André Couto	(China) Audi Sport Asia Team TSRT	18	Ret	29	3	8	9							50
14	(Italy) Gabriele Piana	(South Korea) Solite Indigo Racing	2	5											37
15	(Australia) David Russell	(Chinese Taipei) HubAuto Corsa	3	6											28
16	(Germany) Marco Seefried	(Chinese Taipei) HubAuto Corsa							3	26					21
17	(Switzerland) Patric Niederhauser	(South Korea) Solite Indigo Racing					9	7							18
18	(New Zealand) Jono Lester	(China) Absolute Racing			5	DSQ									10
Entries ineligible to score points
	(Australia) Josh Burdon (Hong Kong) Adderly Fong	(China) Zun Motorsport Crew											9	Ret	
Pos.	Driver	Team	SEP (Malaysia)		CHA (Thailand)		SUZ (Japan)		FUJ (Japan)		KOR (South Korea)		SHA (China)		Points

==== Pro-Am Cup ====
Pos.	Driver	Team	SEP (Malaysia)		CHA (Thailand)		SUZ (Japan)		FUJ (Japan)		KOR (South Korea)		SHA (China)		Points
1	(Thailand) Vutthikorn Inthraphuvasak	(Thailand) Panther / AAS Motorsport	9	2	18	1	**6**	2	Ret	2	8	1	**5**	3	204
2	(Switzerland) Alexandre Imperatori	(Thailand) Panther / AAS Motorsport	9	2	18	1			Ret	2	8	1	**5**	3	171
3	(Hong Kong) Alex Au (Denmark) Frederik Schandorff	(Italy) Vincenzo Sospiri Racing	13	7	6	4	5	25	9	6	9	Ret	15	4	149
4	(Malaysia) Prince Abdul Rahman Ibrahim	Triple Eight Race Engineering Australia	4	13	11	18	13	18	11	5	7	**5**	12	16	120
5	(Chinese Taipei) Jeffrey Lee	(Hong Kong) Craft-Bamboo Racing	1	20	13	**15**	16	**1**	16	**16**	Ret	12	14	2	119
6	(New Zealand) Chris van der Drift	(China) JRM	5	9	8	27	15	8	Ret	Ret	**10**	2	10	**6**	115
7	(Belgium) Alessio Picariello	(Hong Kong) Craft-Bamboo Racing	1	20	13	**15**	16	**1**	16	**16**			14	2	109
8	(Thailand) Piti Bhirombhakdi (Japan) Keita Sawa	(Japan) ABSSA Motorsport	Ret	15	20	8	10	13	7	10	11	10	7	10	107
9	(China) Chao Li	(China) JRM	5	9	8	27	15	8	Ret	Ret			10	**6**	85
10	(Japan) Yuta Kamimura (Japan) Hiroaki Nagai	(Japan) ARN Racing	28	12	14	19	3	12	**6**	9			Ret	DNS	82
11	(China) Congfu Cheng (China) Jingzu Sun	(China) Audi Sport Asia Team Absolute Racing	14	19	23	25	12	11	12	18	13	14	8	14	69
12	(Indonesia) Rio Haryanto	(Singapore) T2 Motorsports	17	18	7	16	18	16	10	Ret	Ret	13	16	8	62
13	(New Zealand) Shane van Gisbergen	Triple Eight Race Engineering Australia					13	18			7	**5**	12	16	61
14	(Malaysia) Jazeman Jaafar	Triple Eight Race Engineering Australia	4	13	11	18			11	5					59
15	(Indonesia) David Tjiptobiantoro	(Singapore) T2 Motorsports	17	18	7	16			10	Ret	Ret	13	16	8	57
16	(Thailand) Bhurit Bhirombhakdi (Thailand) Kantasak Kusiri	(Thailand) Singha Plan-B by Absolute Racing	10	8	10	6	22	17							50
17	(Germany) Marco Holzer	(Thailand) Panther / AAS Motorsport					6	2							33
18	(China) Anthony Liu	(China) JRM Racing									**10**	2			30
19	(China) Wei Xu (Japan) Naoki Yokomizo	(China) Anstone Racing	21	14	15	Ret	14	14	Ret	20			19	11	26
20	(Hong Kong) Philippe Descombes (Hong Kong) Francis Tjia	(Hong Kong) OpenRoad Racing			**9**	7									24
21	(Hong Kong) John Shen	(Hong Kong) Modena Motorsports	11	11	16	12									23
22	(Norway) Dennis Olsen (China) Bo Yuan	(China) Absolute Racing	**6**	**10**											22
23	(Singapore) Daniel Au (Malaysia) Melvin Moh	(Hong Kong) Craft-Bamboo Racing	20	22	22	17	20	21	17	Ret	16	17	21	18	18
24	(Switzerland) Mathias Beche	(Hong Kong) Modena Motorsports	11	11											14
25	(Germany) Maximilian Götz	(Hong Kong) Craft-Bamboo Racing									Ret	12			10
26	(Hong Kong) Philip Tang (Hong Kong) Shaun Thong	(Hong Kong) X Works							19	14					10
27	(Denmark) Benny Simonsen	(Hong Kong) Modena Motorsports			16	12									9
28	(Singapore) Gregory Teo	(Singapore) T2 Motorsports					18	16							5
Pos.	Driver	Team	SEP (Malaysia)		CHA (Thailand)		SUZ (Japan)		FUJ (Japan)		KOR (South Korea)		SHA (China)		Points

==== Am Cup ====
Pos.	Driver	Team	SEP (Malaysia)		CHA (Thailand)		SUZ (Japan)		FUJ (Japan)		KOR (South Korea)		SHA (China)		Points
1	(Australia) Andrew Macpherson (Australia) William Ben Porter	(Australia) AMAC Motorsport	12	**24**	19	**13**	**21**	19	14	15	14	**15**	18	15	191
2	(Japan) Akihiro Asai (Thailand) Chonsawat Asavahame	(Thailand) Vattana Motorsport			17	11	19	15	27	11	**15**	16			139
3	(Australia) Daniel Bilski (Netherlands) Henk Kiks	(Thailand) B-Quik Racing	Ret	16	**21**	9									65
4	(Japan) Kei Nakanishi (Japan) Shigekazu Wakisaka	(Japan) LM Corsa					17	**Ret**	**20**	12					55
5	(Indonesia) Michael Soeryadjaya (Hong Kong) Francis Tjia	(Hong Kong) OpenRoad Racing	**15**	17											36
6	(Japan) Takeshi Kimura (Japan) Yusuke Yamasaki	(Japan) CarGuy Racing							15	**17**					30
7	(Macau) Lic Ka Liu (Hong Kong) Philip Ma	(Malaysia) Arrows Racing	19	23											27
7	(Chinese Taipei) Morris Chen (Australia) Andrew Haryanto	(Chinese Taipei) HubAuto Corsa	22	21											27
8	(Japan) Tamotsu Kondo (Japan) Motoharu Sato	(Japan) Kizashi Koshido Saccess Racing							18	19					25
Entries ineligible to score points
	(China) Chris On Chia (China) Lu Wei	(China) Phantom Pro Racing											**17**	**12**	
	(China) Nan Lin (China) Heng Min	(Chinese Taipei) Team iRace.Win											20	17	
	(China) Ka Chun Ma (China) Yi Ming Lin	(China) Zun Motorsport Crew											22	19	
Pos.	Driver	Team	SEP (Malaysia)		CHA (Thailand)		SUZ (Japan)		FUJ (Japan)		KOR (South Korea)		SHA (China)		Points

=== Teams' championship ===
Only the two best results of a team per race counted towards the Teams' championship.

Pos.	Team	Manufacturer	No.	SEP (Malaysia)		CHA (Thailand)		SUZ (Japan)		FUJ (Japan)		KOR (South Korea)		SHA (China)		Points
GT3
1	(China) (Thailand) / Absolute Racing; (China) (Thailand) / Panther / AAS Motorsport	Porsche	911	8	1	2	10	1	3	**4**	7	3	8	3	25	353
1	(China) (Thailand) / Absolute Racing; (China) (Thailand) / Panther / AAS Motorsport	Porsche	912	**6**	**10**	5	DSQ	2	6	8	13	5	3	11	1	353
1	(China) (Thailand) / Absolute Racing; (China) (Thailand) / Panther / AAS Motorsport	Porsche	918	9	2	18	1	6	2	Ret	2	8	1	5	3	353
2	(South Korea) Solite Indigo Racing	Mercedes-AMG	97	2	5	1	5	9	7	1	8	**1**	4	4	5	163
3	(Chinese Taipei) HubAuto Corsa	Ferrari	27	3	6	4	2	4	4	3	26	2	6	2	Ret	136
3	(Chinese Taipei) HubAuto Corsa	Ferrari	28	22	21											136
4	(China) Audi Sport Asia Team Absolute Racing	Audi	12	16	4	3	Ret	**11**	5	2	1	6	9	**1**	13	123
4	(China) Audi Sport Asia Team Absolute Racing	Audi	13	14	19	23	25	12	11	12	18	13	14	8	14	123
5	(Hong Kong) Craft-Bamboo Racing	Mercedes-AMG	55	20	22	22	17	20	21	17	Ret	16	17	21	18	97
5	(Hong Kong) Craft-Bamboo Racing	Mercedes-AMG	88	1	20	13	**15**	16	**1**	16	**16**	Ret	12	14	2	97
5	(Hong Kong) Craft-Bamboo Racing	Mercedes-AMG	99	7	3	**12**	14	7	10	13	3	12	11	13	9	97
6	(China) Audi Sport Asia Team TSRT	Audi	999	18	Ret	29	3	8	9	5	4	4	7	5	7	81
7	(Italy) Vincenzo Sospiri Racing	Lamborghini	666	13	7	6	4	5	25	9	6	9	Ret	15	4	62
8	(China) JRM	Porsche	910	5	9	8	27	15	8	Ret	Ret	10	2	10	**6**	52
9	Triple Eight Race Engineering Australia	Mercedes-AMG	888	4	13	11	18	13	18	11	5	7	**5**	12	16	39
10	(Japan) ARN Racing	Porsche	8	28	12	14	19	3	12	6	9			Ret	DNS	25
11	(Japan) ABSSA Motorsport	McLaren	61	Ret	15	20	8	10	13	7	10	11	10	7	10	23
12	(Thailand) Singha Plan-B by Absolute Racing	Audi	59	10	8	10	6	22	17							15
13	(Singapore) T2 Motorsports	Ferrari	75	17	18	7	16	18	16	10	Ret	Ret	13	16	8	11
14	(Hong Kong) OpenRoad Racing	Porsche	21	15	17	9	7									8
15	(Thailand) B-Quik Racing	Audi	26	Ret	16	21	9									2
16	(Hong Kong) Modena Motorsports	Porsche	16	11	11	16	12									2
	(Thailand) Vattana Motorsport	Lamborghini	128			17	11	19	15	27	11	15	16			0
	(China) Anstone Racing	Mercedes-AMG	17	21	14	15	Ret	14	14	Ret	20			19	11	0
	(Australia) AMAC Motorsport	Lamborghini	51	12	24	19	13	21	19	14	15	14	15	18	15	0
	(Japan) LM Corsa	Porsche	60					17	Ret	20	12					0
	(Hong Kong) X Works	Audi	83							19	14					0
	(Japan) CarGuy Racing	Ferrari	777							15	17					0
	(Japan) Kizashi Koshido Saccess Racing	Lamborghini	390							18	19					0
	(Malaysia) Arrows Racing	Honda	98	19	23											0
Entries ineligible to score points
	(China) Zun Motorsport Crew	Mercedes-AMG	4											9	Ret	
	(China) Zun Motorsport Crew	Mercedes-AMG	7											22	19	
	(China) Phantom Pro Racing	Mercedes-AMG	5											17	12	
	(Chinese Taipei) Team iRace.Win	Mercedes-AMG	66											20	17	
GT4
1	(Chinese Taipei) Team iRace.Win	Mercedes-AMG	111	25	27	27	**23**	23	Ret	23	23	18	**22**	23	21	330
1	(Chinese Taipei) Team iRace.Win	Mercedes-AMG	199	27	29	28	26	27	24	24	22	19	19	26	22	330
2	(Japan) BMW Team Studie	BMW	81	**23**	**25**	**25**	20	**28**	**20**	**22**	**21**	**20**	18	25	23	284
2	(Japan) BMW Team Studie	BMW	82							26	Ret			24	**20**	284
3	(Hong Kong) Craft-Bamboo Racing	Mercedes-AMG	77	26	26	24	22	26	23	21	25	17	21	27	Ret	179
4	(Japan) GTO Racing with TTR	Mercedes-AMG	11	24	28	26	21	24	Ret	Ret	24	21	20	**28**	24	136
5	(China) Absolute Racing	Audi	89					25	22							33
6	Racing Spirit Thailand	Porsche	80			30	24									18
7	(Japan) Birth Racing Project	Mercedes-AMG	19							25	Ret					10
Pos.	Team	Manufacturer	No.	SEP (Malaysia)		CHA (Thailand)		SUZ (Japan)		FUJ (Japan)		KOR (South Korea)		SHA (China)		Points

== See also ==
- 2019 GT Series
- 2019 GT Series Endurance Cup
- 2019 GT World Challenge America
- 2019 GT World Challenge Europe
