= 2014 3 Hours of Shanghai =

Track map of the Shanghai International Circuit

The 2014 3 Hours of Shanghai was the third round of the 2014 Asian Le Mans Series. It took place on October 11, 2014, at Shanghai International Circuit in Shanghai, China.

== Race result ==
The race result was as follows. Class winners in bold.

Pos	Class	No	Team	Drivers	Chassis	Tyre	Laps
Pos	Class	No	Team	Drivers	Engine	Tyre	Laps
1	**LMP2**	**1**	**(France) OAK Racing Team Total**	**(China) David Cheng** **(China) Ho-Pin Tung**	**Morgan LMP2**	MI	**102**
1	**LMP2**	**1**	**(France) OAK Racing Team Total**	**(China) David Cheng** **(China) Ho-Pin Tung**	**Judd HK 3.6 L V8**	MI	**102**
2	LMP2	27	(Philippines) Eurasia Motorsport	(United Kingdom) James Winslow (United Kingdom) John Hartshorne (China) Pu Jun Jin	Oreca 03	MI	101
2	LMP2	27	(Philippines) Eurasia Motorsport	(United Kingdom) James Winslow (United Kingdom) John Hartshorne (China) Pu Jun Jin	Nissan VK45DE 4.5 L V8	MI	101
3	**GT**	**33**	**(Singapore) Clearwater Racing**	**(Singapore) Weng Sun Mok** **(Republic of Ireland) Matt Griffin** **(Japan) Keita Sawa**	**Ferrari 458 Italia GT3**	MI	**96**
3	**GT**	**33**	**(Singapore) Clearwater Racing**	**(Singapore) Weng Sun Mok** **(Republic of Ireland) Matt Griffin** **(Japan) Keita Sawa**	**Ferrari F142 4.5 L V8**	MI	**96**
4	GT	91	(Chinese Taipei) AAI-Rstrada	(United Kingdom) Ollie Millroy (Taiwan) Jun San Chen (Japan) Tatsuya Tanigawa	BMW Z4 GT3	MI	97
4	GT	91	(Chinese Taipei) AAI-Rstrada	(United Kingdom) Ollie Millroy (Taiwan) Jun San Chen (Japan) Tatsuya Tanigawa	BMW 4.4 L V8	MI	97
5	GT	90	(Chinese Taipei) AAI-Rstrada	(China) Yu Lam (Japan) Takamitsu Matsui (Japan) Takeshi Tsuchiya	Mercedes-Benz SLS AMG GT3	MI	97
5	GT	90	(Chinese Taipei) AAI-Rstrada	(China) Yu Lam (Japan) Takamitsu Matsui (Japan) Takeshi Tsuchiya	Mercedes-Benz 6.2 L V8	MI	97
6	GT	92	(Chinese Taipei) AAI-Rstrada	(Taiwan) Hanchen Chen (Germany) Jörg Müller (Germany) Marco Seefried	BMW Z4 GT3	MI	98
6	GT	92	(Chinese Taipei) AAI-Rstrada	(Taiwan) Hanchen Chen (Germany) Jörg Müller (Germany) Marco Seefried	BMW 4.4 L V8	MI	98
7	**CN**	**77**	**(Hong Kong) Craft-Bamboo Racing**	**(Japan) Naoki Yokomizo** **(Macau) Kevin Tse** **(Canada) Samson Chan**	**Ligier JS53**	MI	**87**
7	**CN**	**77**	**(Hong Kong) Craft-Bamboo Racing**	**(Japan) Naoki Yokomizo** **(Macau) Kevin Tse** **(Canada) Samson Chan**	**Honda 2.0 L I4**	MI	**87**
8	CN	21	(Malaysia) Team Avelon Formula	(Singapore) Denis Lian (Italy) Guglielmo Belotti	Wolf GB08	MI	87
8	CN	21	(Malaysia) Team Avelon Formula	(Singapore) Denis Lian (Italy) Guglielmo Belotti	Honda 2.0 L I4	MI	87
