= Inje Speedium =

Race track in the Inje County, South Korea

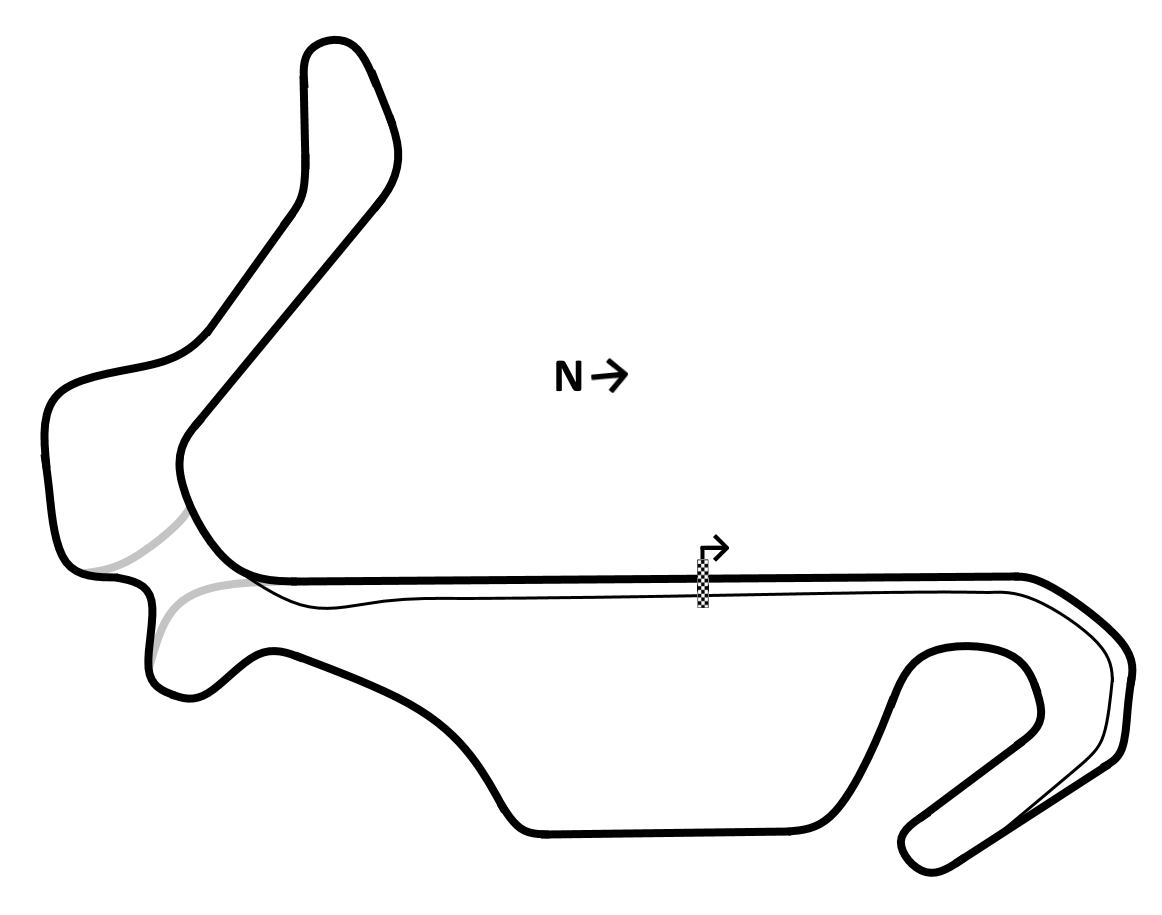
- Full Circuit (2013–present)
- Location: Inje, Gangwon, South Korea
- Coordinates: 38°00′05″N 128°17′31″E
- Capacity: 20,000 (Grandstands)
- FIA Grade: 2
- Broke ground: August 2010; 16 years ago
- Opened: 25 May 2013; 13 years ago
- Architect: Alan Wilson
- Major events: Current: TCR World Tour (2025–present); TCR Asia Tour (2025–present); Lamborghini Super Trofeo Asia (2023–present); Superrace Championship (2015–present); Future: FR Asia (2027); Former: Asian Le Mans Series (2013–2014); Ferrari Challenge Asia–Pacific (2013–2014); Formula Masters China (2014); Super Taikyu (2013)
- Website: http://www.speedium.co.kr/

Full Circuit (2013–present)
- Length: 3.908 km (2.428 mi)
- Turns: 20
- Race lap record: 1:25.148 ( (China) Ho Pin Tung, Morgan LMP2, 2014, LMP2)

North Circuit (2013–present)
- Length: 2.577 km (1.601 mi)
- Turns: 12

South Circuit (2013–present)
- Length: 1.375 km (0.854 mi)
- Turns: 8

Inje Speedium is a motor racing circuit in Inje County, South Korea, about 50 km (31 mi) east of Chuncheon and 120 km (75 mi) east of Seoul. The circuit is part of a larger complex, named the Inje Auto Theme Park, that includes a hotel and condominiums. The main course is 3.908 km (2.428 mi), but can be split into separate 2.577 km (1.601 mi) and 1.375 km (0.854 mi) circuits.

== History ==
The track opened with a round of the Japanese Super Taikyu series on 25 May 2013, and held the opening round of the 2013 Asian Le Mans Series on 4 August 2013.

The circuit was due to host the eighth round of the 2020 World Touring Car Cup on the 18th of October 2020. However, due to the COVID-19 pandemic, the round was cancelled; and it would host the sixth round of 2021 World Touring Car Cup on 16–17 October 2021. But the 2021 round was cancelled again due to the pandemic.

== Events ==
Current

- July: Lamborghini Super Trofeo Asia, Superrace Championship, Hyundai N Festival
- August: Superrace Championship
- October: TCR World Tour, TCR Asia Tour, Hyundai N Festival

Future

- Formula Regional Asian Championship (2027)

Former

- Asian Le Mans Series
  - 3 Hours of Inje (2013–2014)
- Audi R8 LMS Cup (2013)
- Ferrari Challenge Asia–Pacific (2013–2014)
- Formula Masters China (2014)
- Porsche Carrera Cup Asia (2013)
- Super Taikyu (2013)
- TCR Korea Touring Car Series (2018)

== Lap records ==
As of September 2025, the fastest official race lap records at the Inje Speedium are listed as:

Category	Time	Driver	Vehicle	Event
Full Circuit (2013–present): 3.908 km (2.428 mi)
LMP2	1:25.148	Ho Pin Tung	Morgan LMP2	2014 3 Hours of Inje
CN	1:29.773	Mathias Beche	Ligier JS53	2014 3 Hours of Inje
Formula Abarth	1:32.695	James Munro	Tatuus FA010	2014 Inje Formula Masters China round
GT3	1:32.888	Han-Chen Chen	BMW Z4 GT3	2014 3 Hours of Inje
LM GTE	1:33.640	Kamui Kobayashi	Ferrari 458 GTE	2013 3 Hours of Inje
Audi R8 LMS Cup	1:34.658	Earl Bamber	Audi R8 LMS ultra	2013 Inje Audi R8 LMS Cup round
Lamborghini Super Trofeo	1:36.599	Oscar Lee	Lamborghini Huracán Super Trofeo Evo2	2023 Inje Lamborghini Super Trofeo Asia round
Porsche Carrera Cup	1:37.815	Alexandre Imperatori	Porsche 911 (991 I) GT3 Cup	2013 Inje Porsche Carrera Cup Asia round
Ferrari Challenge	1:38.898	Steve Wyatt	Ferrari 458 Challenge Evo	2014 Inje Ferrari Challenge Asia–Pacific round
TCR Touring Car	1:40.147	Park Jun-ui	Hyundai Elantra N TCR	2025 1st Inje TCR Asia round
