= Kevin Tse =

Macanese racing driver

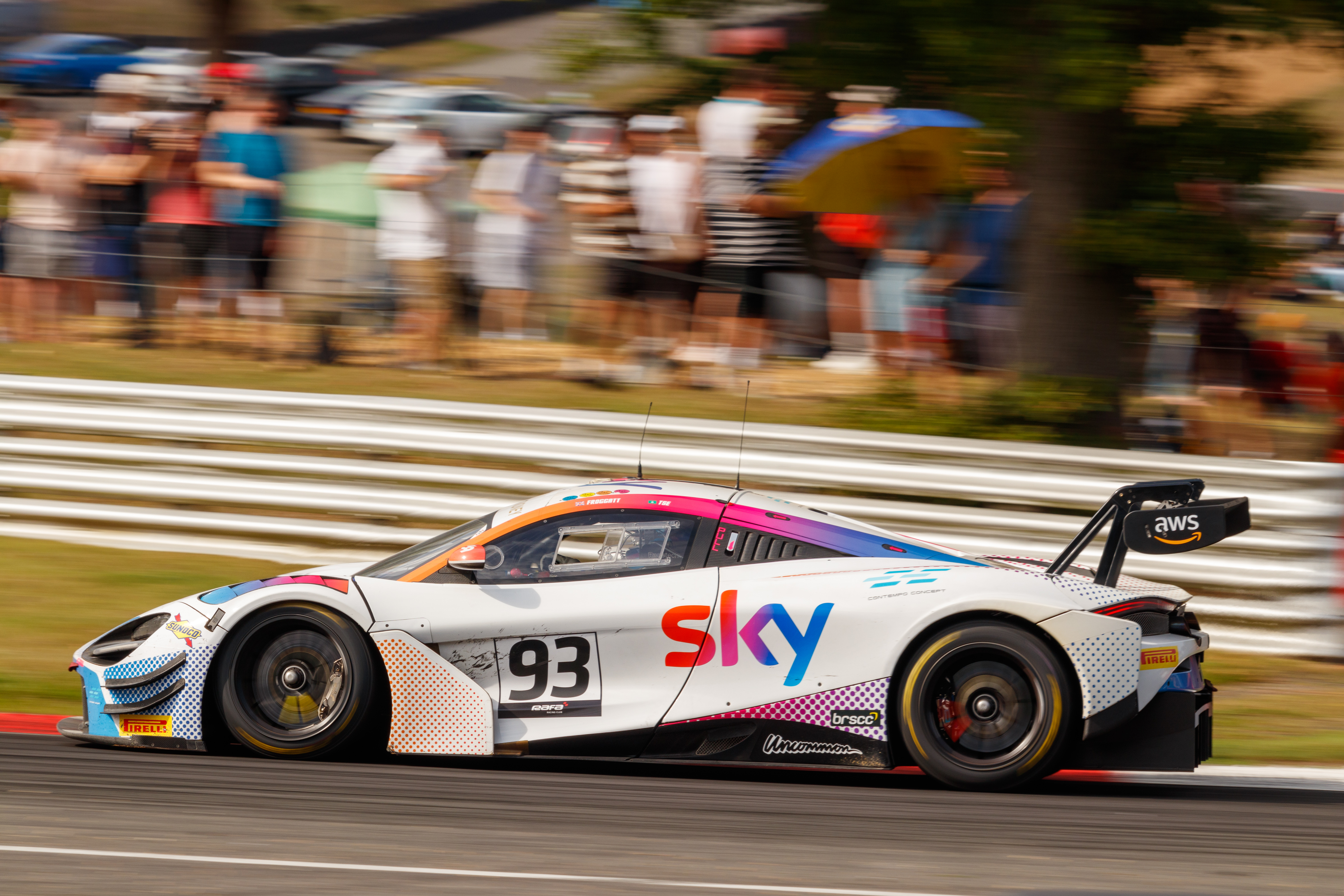
- Nationality: (Macau) Macanese; Hong Kong
- Born: 19 January 1979 (age 47) British Hong Kong

TCR International Series career
- Debut season: 2016
- Current team: TeamWork Motorsport
- Categorisation: FIA Bronze
- Car number: 28
- Starts: 2

Previous series
- 2016 2016 2015 2015 2014 2013 2012 2012 2012 2011 2010 2010 2009: TCR Asia Series; Zhuhai 500km Clio Cup China Series; CTM Macau Touring Car Cup; Asian Le Mans Series; Porsche Carrera Cup Asia; Audi R8 LMS Cup; Dubai 24 Hour; Lamborghini Super Trofeo Asia; Macau AAMC Roadsport Series; GT Asia Series; Volkswagen Scirocco Cup China; ADAC Volkswagen Polo Cup

Championship titles
- 2011: Macau AAMC Roadsport Series

Tse Wing Kin (謝榮鍵) (born 19 January 1979), also known as Kevin Tse, is a Hong Kong-born Macanese racing driver currently competing in the British GT Championship with Sky Tempesta Racing.

== Racing career ==
Tse began his career in 2009 in the ADAC Volkswagen Polo Cup. He switched to the Chinese Volkswagen Scirocco Cup in 2010, finishing second in the championship standings that year. He also raced a couple of races in the GT Asia Series that season. He switched to the Macau AAMC Roadsport Series in 2011 and won the title that year. For 2012, he switched to the Lamborghini Super Trofeo Asia, finishing second in the championship that year. He also took part in the 2012 Dubai 24 Hour, finishing fifth in the A2 class, while also making a one-off appearance in the Audi R8 LMS Cup that year. He switched to the Porsche Carrera Cup Asia for 2013 finishing third in the B class at 2012 Macau Grand Prix. For 2014, he switched to the Asian Le Mans Series, winning the CN class that season. In 2015, he raced in the Clio Cup China Series and the CTM Macau Touring Car Cup finishing fourteenth and eleventh in the two championships respectively. He switched to the TCR Asia Series for 2016, joining the series with TeamWork Motorsport.

In September 2016, it was announced that Tse would race in the TCR International Series, driving a Volkswagen Golf GTI TCR for TeamWork Motorsport.

== Racing record ==
=== Complete British GT Championship results ===
(key) (Races in bold indicate pole position) (Races in italics indicate fastest lap)

Year	Team	Car	Class	1	2	3	4	5	6	7	8	9	DC	Points
2021	Ram Racing	Mercedes-AMG GT3 Evo	GT3	BRH; 1	SIL; 1	DON; 1	SPA; 1	SNE; 1	SNE; 2	OUL; 1; 1	OUL; 2; 21	DON; 1	NC†	0†
2022	Sky - Tempesta Racing	McLaren 720S GT3	GT3	OUL; 1; 12	OUL; 2; 5	SIL; 1; 10	DON; 1	SNE; 1	SNE; 2	SPA; 1	BRH; 1	DON; 1	NC†	0†
2023	Sky - Tempesta Racing	McLaren 720S GT3 Evo	GT3	OUL; 1; 13	OUL; 2; 15	SIL; 1; 12	DON; 1; 6	SNE; 1; 4	SNE; 2; 8	ALG; 1; 9	BRH; 1; 10	DON; 1; 12	13th	35.5
2024	2 Seas Motorsport	Mercedes-AMG GT3 Evo	GT3	OUL; 1; 13	OUL; 2; 10	**SIL**; **1**; 12	DON; 1; 7	**SPA**; **1**; 1	SNE; 1; 9	SNE; 2; 1	DON; 1; 12	BRH; 1 Ret	7th	75
2025	2 Seas Motorsport	Mercedes-AMG GT3 Evo	GT3	DON; 1; 3	SIL; 1; 13	OUL; 1; 2	**OUL**; **2**; 1	SPA; 1; 19	SNE; 1; 2	**SNE**; **2**; 1	**BRH**; **1**; 7	DON; 1; 3	3rd	141.5
2026	2 Seas Motorsport	Mercedes-AMG GT3 Evo	GT3	SIL; 1 Ret	OUL; 1; 6	OUL; 2; 3	SPA; 1; 5	SNE; 1; 8	SNE; 2; 7	DON; 1; 2	**BRH**; **1**; 6		7th	87

^{†} As Tse was a guest driver he was ineligible to score points.
^{*} Season still in progress.

=== Complete TCR International Series results ===
(key) (Races in bold indicate pole position) (Races in italics indicate fastest lap)

Year	Team	Car	1	2	3	4	5	6	7	8	9	10	11	12	13	14	15	16	17	18	19	20	21	22	DC	Points
2016	TeamWork Motorsport	Volkswagen Golf GTI TCR	BHR; 1	BHR; 2	POR; 1	POR; 2	BEL; 1	BEL; 2	ITA; 1	ITA; 2	AUT; 1	AUT; 2	GER; 1	GER; 2	RUS; 1	RUS; 2	THA; 1	THA; 2	SIN; 1	SIN; 2	MYS; 1; 12	MYS; 2; 11	MAC; 1; 17	MAC; 2 Ret	NC	0

=== Complete World Touring Car Cup results ===
(key) (Races in bold indicate pole position) (Races in italics indicate fastest lap)

Year	Team	Car	1	2	3	4	5	6	7	8	9	10	11	12	13	14	15	16	17	18	19	20	21	22	23	24	25	26	27	28	29	30	DC	Points
2018	Teamwork Motorsport	Audi RS 3 LMS TCR	MAR; 1	MAR; 2	MAR; 3	HUN; 1	HUN; 2	HUN; 3	GER; 1	GER; 2	GER; 3	NED; 1	NED; 2	NED; 3	POR; 1	POR; 2	POR; 3	SVK; 1	SVK; 2	SVK; 3	CHN; 1	CHN; 2	CHN; 3	WUH; 1	WUH; 2	WUH; 3	JPN; 1	JPN; 2	JPN; 3	MAC; 1 Ret	MAC; 2; 18	MAC; 3; 17	28th	10

=== TCR Spa 500 results ===
Year	Team	Co-Drivers	Car	Class	Laps	Pos.	Class Pos.
2019	(Netherlands) Bas Koeten Racing	(Hong Kong) Alex Au (Hong Kong) Eric Kwong (Hong Kong) Eric Lo	Audi RS 3 LMS TCR	**Am**	361	10th DNF/Crash	**3rd** DNF/Crash
