= Tatsuya Tanigawa =

Japanese racing driver

Tatsuya Tanigawa (谷川 達也 - Tanigawa Tatsuya; born September 2, 1971) is a Japanese professional racing driver.

== Racing record ==
=== Complete JGTC/Super GT results ===
Year	Team	Car	Class	1	2	3	4	5	6	7	8	9	DC	Pts
1996	FET RACING TEAM	Toyota Supra	GT500	SUZ; 10	FUJ; 13	SEN; 6	FUJ	SUG	MIN				18th	7
1997	TOYOTA TEAM SARD	Toyota Supra	GT500	SUZ	FUJ; 1	SEN; 5	FUJ; 1	MIN; 13	SUG; 7				5th	52
1998	TOYOTA TEAM SARD	Toyota Supra	GT500	SUZ; 3	FUJ; C	SEN; 4	FUJ; 9	MOT; Ret	MIN; 3	SUG; Ret			6th	36
1999	CUSCO Racing	Subaru Impreza	GT300	SUZ; Ret	FUJ; Ret	SUG; 4	MIN; 8	FUJ; 18	TAI; 3	MOT; 6			11th	31
2000	CUSCO Racing	Subaru Impreza	GT300	MOT	FUJ; 4	SUG; 3	FUJ; 5	TAI; Ret	MIN; 6	SUZ; Ret			9th	36
2001	CUSCO Racing	Subaru Impreza	GT300	TAI; 2	FUJ; Ret	SUG; 3	FUJ; 10	MOT; 6	SUZ; Ret	MIN; Ret			8th	34
2002	CUSCO Racing	Subaru Impreza	GT300	TAI; 7	FUJ; 6	SUG; 2	SEP; 16	FUJ; 5	MOT; 2	MIN; 7	SUZ; Ret		8th	53
2003	CUSCO Racing	Subaru Impreza	GT300	TAI; 10	FUJ; Ret	SUG; 6	FUJ; 24	FUJ; 19	MOT; Ret	AUT; 9	SUZ; Ret		21st	10
2004	CUSCO Racing	Subaru Impreza	GT300	TAI; 14	SUG; 12	SEP; 18	TOK; 6	MOT; 11	AUT; 3	SUZ; 11			11th	17
2005	CUSCO Racing	Subaru Impreza	GT300	OKA; 12	FUJ; 21	SEP; 10	SUG; 11	MOT; 13	FUJ; 9	AUT; Ret	SUZ; 13		18th	3
2006	CUSCO Racing	Subaru Impreza	GT300	SUZ	OKA	FUJ	SEP	SUG; Ret	SUZ	MOT	AUT	FUJ	NC	0

=== Complete Japanese Touring Car Championship (1994-) results ===
Year	Team	Car	1	2	3	4	5	6	7	8	9	10	11	12	13	14	DC	Pts
1996	FET Racing Team	Toyota Corolla	FUJ; 1; 16	FUJ; 2 Ret	SUG; 1 Ret	SUG; 2 Ret	SUZ; 1; 15	SUZ; 2 Ret	MIN; 1 Ret	MIN; 2; 13	SEN; 1	SEN; 2	TOK; 1	TOK; 2	FUJ; 1	FUJ; 2	NC	0
1998	Object T	Toyota Corona EXiV	FUJ; 1; 5	FUJ; 2; 7	MOT	SUG; 1	SUG; 2	SUZ; 1	SUZ; 2	MIN; 1	MIN; 2	AID	FUJ				10th	14
