= 2016 3 Hours of Thailand =

The Track map of the Buriram International Circuit

The 2016 3 Hours of Thailand was the third round of the 2015-16 Asian Le Mans Series season. It took place on January 10, 2016, at Buriram International Circuit in Buriram, Thailand.

== Race result ==
Class winners in bold.

Pos	Class	No	Team	Drivers	Chassis	Laps
Pos	Class	No	Team	Drivers	Engine	Laps
1	**LMP2**	**9**	**(Indonesia) Jagonya Ayam with Eurasia**	**(Indonesia) Sean Gelael** **(Italy) Antonio Giovinazzi**	**Oreca 03R**	**113**
1	**LMP2**	**9**	**(Indonesia) Jagonya Ayam with Eurasia**	**(Indonesia) Sean Gelael** **(Italy) Antonio Giovinazzi**	**Nissan VK45DE 4.5 L V8**	**113**
2	LMP2	25	(Portugal) Algarve Pro Racing	(Australia) Dean Koutsoumidis (United Kingdom) Michael Munemann (United Kingdom) James Winslow	Ligier JS P2	113
2	LMP2	25	(Portugal) Algarve Pro Racing	(Australia) Dean Koutsoumidis (United Kingdom) Michael Munemann (United Kingdom) James Winslow	Nissan VK45DE 4.5 L V8	113
3	LMP2	8	(Switzerland) Race Performance	(Switzerland) Nicolas Leutwiler (United Kingdom) Oliver Webb	Oreca 03R	113
3	LMP2	8	(Switzerland) Race Performance	(Switzerland) Nicolas Leutwiler (United Kingdom) Oliver Webb	Judd HK 3.6 L V8	113
4	LMP2	99	(Philippines) Eurasia Motorsport	(Hong Kong) William Lok (Netherlands) Nick de Bruijn (United Kingdom) Richard Bradley	Oreca 03R	111
4	LMP2	99	(Philippines) Eurasia Motorsport	(Hong Kong) William Lok (Netherlands) Nick de Bruijn (United Kingdom) Richard Bradley	Nissan VK45DE 4.5 L V8	111
5	**LMP3**	**1**	**(China) DC Racing**	**(China) David Cheng** **(China) Ho-Pin Tung** **(France) Thomas Laurent**	**Ligier JS P3**	**109**
5	**LMP3**	**1**	**(China) DC Racing**	**(China) David Cheng** **(China) Ho-Pin Tung** **(France) Thomas Laurent**	**Nissan VK50 5.0 L V8**	**109**
6	**GT**	**27**	**(Malaysia) Nexus Infinity**	**(Malaysia) Dominic Ang** **(Australia) Joshua Hunt**	**Ferrari 458 Italia GT3**	**108**
6	**GT**	**27**	**(Malaysia) Nexus Infinity**	**(Malaysia) Dominic Ang** **(Australia) Joshua Hunt**	**Ferrari 4.5 L V8**	**108**
7	GT	5	(China) Absolute Racing	(Chinese Taipei) Jeffrey Lee (Belgium) Alessio Picariello (China) Adderly Fong	Audi R8 LMS	108
7	GT	5	(China) Absolute Racing	(Chinese Taipei) Jeffrey Lee (Belgium) Alessio Picariello (China) Adderly Fong	Audi 5.2 L V10	108
8	GT	91	(Chinese Taipei) Team AAI	(Chinese Taipei) Jun-San Chen (United Kingdom) Ollie Millroy (Japan) Nobuteru Taniguchi	BMW Z4 GT3	108
8	GT	91	(Chinese Taipei) Team AAI	(Chinese Taipei) Jun-San Chen (United Kingdom) Ollie Millroy (Japan) Nobuteru Taniguchi	BMW 4.4 L V8	108
9	GT	92	(Chinese Taipei) Team AAI - Hubauto	(Chinese Taipei) Han-Chen Chen (Japan) Shinya Hosokawa (Japan) Hiroki Yoshimoto	Mercedes-Benz SLS AMG GT3	108
9	GT	92	(Chinese Taipei) Team AAI - Hubauto	(Chinese Taipei) Han-Chen Chen (Japan) Shinya Hosokawa (Japan) Hiroki Yoshimoto	Mercedes-Benz 6.2 L V8	108
10	GT	3	(Singapore) Clearwater Racing	(Singapore) Weng Sun Mok (Japan) Keita Sawa (United Kingdom) Rob Bell	McLaren 650S GT3	107
10	GT	3	(Singapore) Clearwater Racing	(Singapore) Weng Sun Mok (Japan) Keita Sawa (United Kingdom) Rob Bell	McLaren 3.8 L Turbo V8	107
11	LMP3	89	(Chinese Taipei) Team AAI	(Japan) Masataka Yanagida (Japan) Ryohei Sakaguchi (Thailand) Tanart Sathienthirakul	ADESS-03	105
11	LMP3	89	(Chinese Taipei) Team AAI	(Japan) Masataka Yanagida (Japan) Ryohei Sakaguchi (Thailand) Tanart Sathienthirakul	Nissan VK50 5.0 L V8	105
12	**GTAm**	**51**	**(Hong Kong) KCMG**	**(Hong Kong) Paul Ip** **(China) Yuan Bo** **(Estonia) Martin Rump**	**Porsche 997 GT3 Cup**	**101**
12	**GTAm**	**51**	**(Hong Kong) KCMG**	**(Hong Kong) Paul Ip** **(China) Yuan Bo** **(Estonia) Martin Rump**	**Porsche 4.0 L Flat-6**	**101**
13	GT	7	(Slovakia) ARC Bratislava	(Slovakia) Miroslav Konôpka (Malaysia) Fairuz Fauzy	Audi R8 LMS Ultra	95
13	GT	7	(Slovakia) ARC Bratislava	(Slovakia) Miroslav Konôpka (Malaysia) Fairuz Fauzy	Audi 5.2 L V10	95
14	GT	38	(Switzerland) Spirit of Race	(Singapore) Nasrat Muzayyin (United Kingdom) Aaron Scott	Ferrari 458 Italia GT3	93
14	GT	38	(Switzerland) Spirit of Race	(Singapore) Nasrat Muzayyin (United Kingdom) Aaron Scott	Ferrari 4.5 L V8	93
DNF	CN	21	(Italy) Avelon Formula	(Singapore) Denis Lian (Switzerland) Giorgio Maggi	Wolf GB08	59
DNF	CN	21	(Italy) Avelon Formula	(Singapore) Denis Lian (Switzerland) Giorgio Maggi	Honda 2.0 L I4	59
DNF	CN	69	(Canada) Atlantic Racing Team	(Malaysia) Zen Low (Japan) Shinyo Sano	Wolf GB08	45
DNF	CN	69	(Canada) Atlantic Racing Team	(Malaysia) Zen Low (Japan) Shinyo Sano	Honda 2.0 L I4	45
