= 2016 3 Hours of Sepang =

The layout of the Sepang International Circuit

The 2016 3 Hours of Sepang was the fourth round of the 2015-16 Asian Le Mans Series season. It took place on January 24, 2016, at Sepang International Circuit in Sepang, Selangor, Malaysia.

== Race result ==
Class winners in bold.

| Pos | Class | No | Team | Drivers | Chassis | Laps |
| Pos | Class | No | Team | Drivers | Engine | Laps |
|---|---|---|---|---|---|---|
| 1 | **LMP2** | **9** | **(Indonesia) Jagonya Ayam with Eurasia** | **(Indonesia) Sean Gelael** **(Italy) Antonio Giovinazzi** | **Oreca 03R** | **86** |
| 1 | **LMP2** | **9** | **(Indonesia) Jagonya Ayam with Eurasia** | **(Indonesia) Sean Gelael** **(Italy) Antonio Giovinazzi** | **Nissan VK45DE 4.5 L V8** | **86** |
| 2 | LMP2 | 8 | (Switzerland) Race Performance | (Switzerland) Nicolas Leutwiler (United Kingdom) Oliver Webb | Oreca 03R | 86 |
| 2 | LMP2 | 8 | (Switzerland) Race Performance | (Switzerland) Nicolas Leutwiler (United Kingdom) Oliver Webb | Judd HK 3.6 L V8 | 86 |
| 3 | LMP2 | 25 | (Portugal) Algarve Pro Racing | (Australia) Dean Koutsoumidis (United Kingdom) Michael Munemann (United Kingdom) James Winslow | Ligier JS P2 | 84 |
| 3 | LMP2 | 25 | (Portugal) Algarve Pro Racing | (Australia) Dean Koutsoumidis (United Kingdom) Michael Munemann (United Kingdom) James Winslow | Nissan VK45DE 4.5 L V8 | 84 |
| 4 | **LMP3** | **1** | **(China) DC Racing** | **(China) David Cheng** **(China) Ho-Pin Tung** **(France) Thomas Laurent** | **Ligier JS P3** | **84** |
| 4 | **LMP3** | **1** | **(China) DC Racing** | **(China) David Cheng** **(China) Ho-Pin Tung** **(France) Thomas Laurent** | **Nissan VK50 5.0 L V8** | **84** |
| 5 | **GT** | **5** | **(China) Absolute Racing** | **(Chinese Taipei) Jeffrey Lee** **(Belgium) Alessio Picariello** **(Germany) Christopher Mies** | **Audi R8 LMS** | **82** |
| 5 | **GT** | **5** | **(China) Absolute Racing** | **(Chinese Taipei) Jeffrey Lee** **(Belgium) Alessio Picariello** **(Germany) Christopher Mies** | **Audi 5.2 L V10** | **82** |
| 6 | GT | 91 | (Chinese Taipei) Team AAI | (Chinese Taipei) Jun-San Chen (United Kingdom) Ollie Millroy (Japan) Nobuteru Taniguchi | BMW Z4 GT3 | 81 |
| 6 | GT | 91 | (Chinese Taipei) Team AAI | (Chinese Taipei) Jun-San Chen (United Kingdom) Ollie Millroy (Japan) Nobuteru Taniguchi | BMW 4.4 L V8 | 81 |
| 7 | GT | 3 | (Singapore) Clearwater Racing | (Singapore) Weng Sun Mok (Japan) Keita Sawa (United Kingdom) Rob Bell | McLaren 650S GT3 | 81 |
| 7 | GT | 3 | (Singapore) Clearwater Racing | (Singapore) Weng Sun Mok (Japan) Keita Sawa (United Kingdom) Rob Bell | McLaren 3.8 L Turbo V8 | 81 |
| 8 | GT | 27 | (Malaysia) Nexus Infinity | (Malaysia) Dominic Ang (Australia) Joshua Hunt (Malaysia) Adrian D'Silva | Ferrari 458 Italia GT3 | 81 |
| 8 | GT | 27 | (Malaysia) Nexus Infinity | (Malaysia) Dominic Ang (Australia) Joshua Hunt (Malaysia) Adrian D'Silva | Ferrari 4.5 L V8 | 81 |
| 9 | GT | 38 | (Switzerland) Spirit of Race | (Singapore) Nasrat Muzayyin (United Kingdom) Aaron Scott (Italy) Marco Cioci | Ferrari 458 Italia GT3 | 81 |
| 9 | GT | 38 | (Switzerland) Spirit of Race | (Singapore) Nasrat Muzayyin (United Kingdom) Aaron Scott (Italy) Marco Cioci | Ferrari 4.5 L V8 | 81 |
| 10 | GT | 92 | (Chinese Taipei) Team AAI - Hubauto | (Chinese Taipei) Han-Chen Chen (Japan) Shinya Hosokawa (Japan) Hiroki Yoshimoto | Mercedes-Benz SLS AMG GT3 | 81 |
| 10 | GT | 92 | (Chinese Taipei) Team AAI - Hubauto | (Chinese Taipei) Han-Chen Chen (Japan) Shinya Hosokawa (Japan) Hiroki Yoshimoto | Mercedes-Benz 6.2 L V8 | 81 |
| 11 | GT | 66 | (China) Bentley Team Absolute | (South Korea) Andrew Kim (Thailand) Tanart Sathienthirakul (Australia) Jonathan Venter | Bentley Continental GT3 | 80 |
| 11 | GT | 66 | (China) Bentley Team Absolute | (South Korea) Andrew Kim (Thailand) Tanart Sathienthirakul (Australia) Jonathan Venter | Bentley 4.0 L V8 twin-turbo | 80 |
| 12 | GT | 7 | (Slovakia) ARC Bratislava | (Slovakia) Miroslav Konôpka (Malaysia) Fairuz Fauzy (Malaysia) Afiq Yazid | Audi R8 LMS Ultra | 80 |
| 12 | GT | 7 | (Slovakia) ARC Bratislava | (Slovakia) Miroslav Konôpka (Malaysia) Fairuz Fauzy (Malaysia) Afiq Yazid | Audi 5.2 L V10 | 80 |
| 13 | GT | 93 | (Chinese Taipei) Team AAI | (Japan) Shunsuke Kohno (Japan) Tatsuya Tanigawa | McLaren MP4-12C GT3 | 78 |
| 13 | GT | 93 | (Chinese Taipei) Team AAI | (Japan) Shunsuke Kohno (Japan) Tatsuya Tanigawa | McLaren 3.8 L twin-turbo V8 | 78 |
| 14 | **CN** | **21** | **(Italy) Avelon Formula** | **(Singapore) Denis Lian** **(Switzerland) Giorgio Maggi** | **Wolf GB08** | **77** |
| 14 | **CN** | **21** | **(Italy) Avelon Formula** | **(Singapore) Denis Lian** **(Switzerland) Giorgio Maggi** | **Honda 2.0 L I4** | **77** |
| 15 | GT | 6 | (China) Bentley Team Absolute | (United States) Andrew Palmer (China) Adderly Fong | Bentley Continental GT3 | 77 |
| 15 | GT | 6 | (China) Bentley Team Absolute | (United States) Andrew Palmer (China) Adderly Fong | Bentley 4.0 L V8 twin-turbo | 77 |
| 16 | **GTAm** | **51** | **(Hong Kong) KCMG** | **(Hong Kong) Paul Ip** **(China) Yuan Bo** **(Malaysia) Akash Nandy** | **Porsche 997 GT3 Cup** | **77** |
| 16 | **GTAm** | **51** | **(Hong Kong) KCMG** | **(Hong Kong) Paul Ip** **(China) Yuan Bo** **(Malaysia) Akash Nandy** | **Porsche 4.0 L Flat-6** | **77** |
| 17 | GTAm | 77 | (Hong Kong) Team Starspeed Racing | (Hong Kong) Chong Yau Wong (South Korea) Rick Yoon | Lamborghini Huracán Super Trofeo | 75 |
| 17 | GTAm | 77 | (Hong Kong) Team Starspeed Racing | (Hong Kong) Chong Yau Wong (South Korea) Rick Yoon | Lamborghini 5.2 L V10 | 75 |
| DNF | LMP3 | 89 | (Chinese Taipei) Team AAI | (Japan) Masataka Yanagida (China) Chen Siyu (China) Lam Yu | ADESS-03 | 54 |
| DNF | LMP3 | 89 | (Chinese Taipei) Team AAI | (Japan) Masataka Yanagida (China) Chen Siyu (China) Lam Yu | Nissan VK50 5.0 L V8 | 54 |
| DNF | LMP2 | 99 | (Philippines) Eurasia Motorsport | (Hong Kong) William Lok (South Korea) Tacksung Kim (United Kingdom) Richard Bradley | Oreca 03R | 35 |
| DNF | LMP2 | 99 | (Philippines) Eurasia Motorsport | (Hong Kong) William Lok (South Korea) Tacksung Kim (United Kingdom) Richard Bradley | Nissan VK45DE 4.5 L V8 | 35 |
