= 2015 3 Hours of Sepang =

The layout of the Sepang International Circuit

The 2015 3 Hours of Sepang was the second round of the 2015-16 Asian Le Mans Series season. It took place on November 8, 2015, at Sepang International Circuit in Sepang, Selangor, Malaysia.

== Race result ==
Class winners in bold.

Pos	Class	No	Team	Drivers	Chassis	Laps
Pos	Class	No	Team	Drivers	Engine	Laps
1	**LMP2**	**8**	**(Switzerland) Race Performance**	**(Switzerland) Nicolas Leutwiler** **(Japan) Shinji Nakano**	**Oreca 03R**	**85**
1	**LMP2**	**8**	**(Switzerland) Race Performance**	**(Switzerland) Nicolas Leutwiler** **(Japan) Shinji Nakano**	**Judd HK 3.6 L V8**	**85**
2	LMP2	25	(Portugal) Algarve Pro Racing	(Australia) Dean Koutsoumidis (United Kingdom) Michael Munemann (United Kingdom) James Winslow	Ligier JS P2	85
2	LMP2	25	(Portugal) Algarve Pro Racing	(Australia) Dean Koutsoumidis (United Kingdom) Michael Munemann (United Kingdom) James Winslow	Nissan VK45DE 4.5 L V8	85
3	LMP2	99	(Philippines) Eurasia Motorsport	(Hong Kong) William Lok (South Korea) Tacksung Kim (United Kingdom) Richard Bradley	Oreca 03R	84
3	LMP2	99	(Philippines) Eurasia Motorsport	(Hong Kong) William Lok (South Korea) Tacksung Kim (United Kingdom) Richard Bradley	Nissan VK45DE 4.5 L V8	84
4	**GT**	**3**	**(Singapore) Clearwater Racing**	**(Singapore) Weng Sun Mok** **(Japan) Keita Sawa** **(United Kingdom) Rob Bell**	**McLaren 650S GT3**	**82**
4	**GT**	**3**	**(Singapore) Clearwater Racing**	**(Singapore) Weng Sun Mok** **(Japan) Keita Sawa** **(United Kingdom) Rob Bell**	**McLaren 3.8 L Turbo V8**	**82**
5	GT	91	(Chinese Taipei) Team AAI	(Chinese Taipei) Jun-San Chen (United Kingdom) Ollie Millroy (Germany) Dirk Müller	BMW Z4 GT3	81
5	GT	91	(Chinese Taipei) Team AAI	(Chinese Taipei) Jun-San Chen (United Kingdom) Ollie Millroy (Germany) Dirk Müller	BMW 4.4 L V8	81
6	GT	90	(Chinese Taipei) Team AAI	(Japan) Tatsuya Tanigawa (China) Lam Yu	Mercedes-Benz SLS AMG GT3	81
6	GT	90	(Chinese Taipei) Team AAI	(Japan) Tatsuya Tanigawa (China) Lam Yu	Mercedes-Benz 6.2 L V8	81
7	GT	38	(Switzerland) Spirit of Race	(Singapore) Nasrat Muzayyin (Portugal) Rui Águas	Ferrari 458 Italia GT3	81
7	GT	38	(Switzerland) Spirit of Race	(Singapore) Nasrat Muzayyin (Portugal) Rui Águas	Ferrari 4.5 L V8	81
8	GT	27	(Malaysia) Nexus Infinity	(Malaysia) Dominic Ang (Australia) Joshua Hunt	Ferrari 458 Italia GT3	81
8	GT	27	(Malaysia) Nexus Infinity	(Malaysia) Dominic Ang (Australia) Joshua Hunt	Ferrari 4.5 L V8	81
9	GT	92	(Chinese Taipei) Team AAI - Hubauto	(Chinese Taipei) Han-Chen Chen (Japan) Shinya Hosokawa (Japan) Hiroki Yoshimoto	BMW Z4 GT3	80
9	GT	92	(Chinese Taipei) Team AAI - Hubauto	(Chinese Taipei) Han-Chen Chen (Japan) Shinya Hosokawa (Japan) Hiroki Yoshimoto	BMW 4.4 L V8	80
10	GT	5	(China) Absolute Racing	(Chinese Taipei) Jeffrey Lee (Belgium) Alessio Picariello (South Korea) Andrew Kim	Audi R8 LMS Ultra	79
10	GT	5	(China) Absolute Racing	(Chinese Taipei) Jeffrey Lee (Belgium) Alessio Picariello (South Korea) Andrew Kim	Audi 5.2 L V10	79
11	GT	7	(Slovakia) ARC Bratislava	(Slovakia) Miroslav Konôpka (Malaysia) Fairuz Fauzy	Audi R8 LMS Ultra	79
11	GT	7	(Slovakia) ARC Bratislava	(Slovakia) Miroslav Konôpka (Malaysia) Fairuz Fauzy	Audi 5.2 L V10	79
12	**CN**	**21**	**(Italy) Avelon Formula**	**(Singapore) Denis Lian** **(Switzerland) Giorgio Maggi**	**Wolf GB08**	**78**
12	**CN**	**21**	**(Italy) Avelon Formula**	**(Singapore) Denis Lian** **(Switzerland) Giorgio Maggi**	**Honda 2.0 L I4**	**78**
13	CN	69	(Canada) Atlantic Racing Team	(Malaysia) Zen Low (Sweden) John Bryant-Meisner (Japan) Toshiyuki Ochiai	Wolf GB08	78
13	CN	69	(Canada) Atlantic Racing Team	(Malaysia) Zen Low (Sweden) John Bryant-Meisner (Japan) Toshiyuki Ochiai	Honda 2.0 L I4	78
14	**GTAm**	**51**	**(Hong Kong) KCMG**	**(Hong Kong) Paul Ip** **(Germany) Christian Ried** **(United Kingdom) Dan Wells**	**Porsche 997 GT3 Cup**	**75**
14	**GTAm**	**51**	**(Hong Kong) KCMG**	**(Hong Kong) Paul Ip** **(Germany) Christian Ried** **(United Kingdom) Dan Wells**	**Porsche 4.0 L Flat-6**	**75**
15	LMP3	1	(China) DC Racing	(China) David Cheng (China) Ho-Pin Tung (France) Thomas Laurent	Ligier JS P3	68
15	LMP3	1	(China) DC Racing	(China) David Cheng (China) Ho-Pin Tung (France) Thomas Laurent	Nissan VK50 5.0 L V8	68
16	LMP3	89	(Chinese Taipei) Team AAI	(Japan) Masataka Yanagida (United Kingdom) Ollie Hancock (United Kingdom) Alex Kapadia	ADESS-03	63
16	LMP3	89	(Chinese Taipei) Team AAI	(Japan) Masataka Yanagida (United Kingdom) Ollie Hancock (United Kingdom) Alex Kapadia	Nissan VK50 5.0 L V8	63
