= 2015 2 Hours of Fuji =

The Track map of the Fuji Speedway

The 2015 2 Hours of Fuji was the first round of the 2015-16 Asian Le Mans Series season. It took place on October 10, 2015, at Fuji Speedway in Oyama, Shizuoka, Japan.

== Race result ==
Class winners in bold.

Pos	Class	No	Team	Drivers	Chassis	Laps
Pos	Class	No	Team	Drivers	Engine	Laps
1	**LMP2**	**8**	**(Switzerland) Race Performance**	**(Switzerland) Nicolas Leutwiler** **(Japan) Shinji Nakano**	**Oreca 03R**	**70**
1	**LMP2**	**8**	**(Switzerland) Race Performance**	**(Switzerland) Nicolas Leutwiler** **(Japan) Shinji Nakano**	**Judd HK 3.6 L V8**	**70**
2	**GT**	**3**	**(Singapore) Clearwater Racing**	**(Singapore) Weng Sun Mok** **(Japan) Keita Sawa** **(United Kingdom) Rob Bell**	**McLaren 650S GT3**	**69**
2	**GT**	**3**	**(Singapore) Clearwater Racing**	**(Singapore) Weng Sun Mok** **(Japan) Keita Sawa** **(United Kingdom) Rob Bell**	**McLaren 3.8 L Turbo V8**	**69**
3	**LMP3**	**1**	**(China) DC Racing**	**(China) David Cheng** **(China) Ho-Pin Tung**	**Ligier JS P3**	**69**
3	**LMP3**	**1**	**(China) DC Racing**	**(China) David Cheng** **(China) Ho-Pin Tung**	**Nissan VK50 5.0 L V8**	**69**
4	GT	38	(Switzerland) Spirit of Race	(Singapore) Nasrat Muzayyin (Portugal) Rui Águas	Ferrari 458 Italia GT3	68
4	GT	38	(Switzerland) Spirit of Race	(Singapore) Nasrat Muzayyin (Portugal) Rui Águas	Ferrari 4.5 L V8	68
5	GT	92	(Chinese Taipei) Team AAI - Hubauto	(Chinese Taipei) Han-Chen Chen (Japan) Shinya Hosokawa (Japan) Hiroki Yoshimoto	BMW Z4 GT3	68
5	GT	92	(Chinese Taipei) Team AAI - Hubauto	(Chinese Taipei) Han-Chen Chen (Japan) Shinya Hosokawa (Japan) Hiroki Yoshimoto	BMW 4.4 L V8	68
6	GT	7	(Slovakia) ARC Bratislava	(Slovakia) Miroslav Konôpka (Germany) Pierre Kaffer	Audi R8 LMS Ultra	68
6	GT	7	(Slovakia) ARC Bratislava	(Slovakia) Miroslav Konôpka (Germany) Pierre Kaffer	Audi 5.2 L V10	68
7	GT	5	(China) Absolute Racing	(Chinese Taipei) Jeffrey Lee (Hong Kong) Shaun Thong (Malaysia) Alex Yoong	Audi R8 LMS Ultra	66
7	GT	5	(China) Absolute Racing	(Chinese Taipei) Jeffrey Lee (Hong Kong) Shaun Thong (Malaysia) Alex Yoong	Audi 5.2 L V10	66
8	**GTAm**	**51**	**(Hong Kong) KCMG**	**(Hong Kong) Paul Ip** **(Germany) Christian Ried** **(New Zealand) James Munro**	**Porsche 997 GT3 Cup**	**65**
8	**GTAm**	**51**	**(Hong Kong) KCMG**	**(Hong Kong) Paul Ip** **(Germany) Christian Ried** **(New Zealand) James Munro**	**Porsche 4.0 L Flat-6**	**65**
9	GT	27	(Malaysia) Nexus Infinity	(Malaysia) Dominic Ang (Australia) Joshua Hunt	Ferrari 458 Italia GT3	64
9	GT	27	(Malaysia) Nexus Infinity	(Malaysia) Dominic Ang (Australia) Joshua Hunt	Ferrari 4.5 L V8	64
10	LMP2	99	(Philippines) Eurasia Motorsport	(Hong Kong) William Lok (South Korea) Tacksung Kim (France) Tristan Gommendy	Oreca 03R	62
10	LMP2	99	(Philippines) Eurasia Motorsport	(Hong Kong) William Lok (South Korea) Tacksung Kim (France) Tristan Gommendy	Nissan VK45DE 4.5 L V8	62
Ret	LMP3	89	(Chinese Taipei) Team AAI	(Japan) Masataka Yanagida (Chinese Taipei) Terry Fang (Japan) Takamitsu Matsui	ADESS-03	48
Ret	LMP3	89	(Chinese Taipei) Team AAI	(Japan) Masataka Yanagida (Chinese Taipei) Terry Fang (Japan) Takamitsu Matsui	Nissan VK50 5.0 L V8	48
Ret	LMP3	88	(Chinese Taipei) Team AAI	(Japan) Tatsuya Tanigawa (China) Zhi Cong Li (Japan) Ryohei Sakaguchi	ADESS-03	6
Ret	LMP3	88	(Chinese Taipei) Team AAI	(Japan) Tatsuya Tanigawa (China) Zhi Cong Li (Japan) Ryohei Sakaguchi	Nissan VK50 5.0 L V8	6
Ret	GT	91	(Chinese Taipei) Team AAI	(Chinese Taipei) Jun-San Chen (United Kingdom) Ollie Millroy (Japan) Nobuteru Taniguchi	BMW Z4 GT3	2
Ret	GT	91	(Chinese Taipei) Team AAI	(Chinese Taipei) Jun-San Chen (United Kingdom) Ollie Millroy (Japan) Nobuteru Taniguchi	BMW 4.4 L V8	2
