= 2018 IMSA Michelin Encore =

Race details

Date	11 November 2018
Official name	IMSA Michelin SportsCar Encore
Location	Sebring, Florida, United States
Course	Permanent circuit 6.02 km (3.74 mi)
Distance	Main Race; 4 Hours
- LMP3

Pole
Drivers	(United Kingdom) Matthew Bell (Netherlands) Kay van Berlo (United States) James McGuire Jr.	K2R Motorsports
Time	1:57.102

Podium
First	(Canada) Roman De Angelis (United States) Kyle Kirkwood	ANSA Motorsports
Second	(United Kingdom) Matthew Bell (Netherlands) Kay van Berlo (United States) James McGuire Jr.	K2R Motorsports
Third	(United States) David Grant (United States) Keith Grant (United Kingdom) Katherine Legge	Polestar Motor Racing Inc.
- GS

Pole
Drivers	(Canada) Kyle Marcelli (United States) Dean Martin (United States) Nate Stacy	KohR Motorsports
Time	2:11.352

Podium
First	(Canada) Kyle Marcelli (United States) Dean Martin (United States) Nate Stacy	KohR Motorsports
Second	(United States) Jason Bell (United States) Andy Lally (United States) James Sofronas	GMG Racing
Third	(United States) DJ Randall (United States) Rod Randall (Canada) Kenny Wilden	KohR Motorsports
- TCR

Pole
Drivers	(Canada) Marco Cirone (Canada) Remo Ruscitti	Mark Motors Racing
Time	2:14.426

Podium
First	(Canada) Marco Cirone (Canada) Remo Ruscitti	Mark Motors Racing
Second	(United States) Michael Johnson (South Africa) Stephen Simpson	JDC-Miller Motorsports
Third	(United States) Luke Rumburg (United States) Tanner Rumburg	Rumcastle, LLC

The 2018 IMSA Michelin SportsCar Encore was the inaugural edition of the non-championship sports car race held at Sebring International Raceway on 9 November 2018. The race was contested with LMP3 cars, GT4-spec cars and TCR-touring car. The event was organized by the International Motor Sports Association (IMSA).

The race was won by Roman De Angelis and Kyle Kirkwood, driving a Ligier JS P3 entered by ANSA Motorsports. Kirkwood and teammate Dakota Dickerson signed up at the last minute, given the opportunity by Onroak Automotive North America as a reward for respectively winning the F3 Americas Championship and Formula 4 United States Championship. The event marked Kirkwood's sports car debut.

== Report ==
The race was held as a standalone event, open to Pro-Am teams and drivers regardless of whether they had participated in any IMSA sanctioned events in 2018. Continental would not be providing tyres for the 2019 IMSA SportsCar Championship, leaving Michelin as the sole supplier going forward. For this event, Michelin tyres were mandated to give teams the opportunity to sample them.

Pole position went to the #26 K2R Ligier, qualified by Kay van Berlo in his first race in the United States, from the #13 ANSA Ligier of Roman De Angelis. Van Berlo pulled away from De Angelis in the early phase of the race. The first round of pit stops started on lap 24. Van Berlo extended his stint, but the caution came out on lap 28 when Dean Baker touched the kerb with the underbody of his #4 ANSA Ligier. The cars that had stayed out were forced to pit under yellow and lined up at the tail end of the field. To add insult to injury, the #26 car was caught speeding on pit road and its second driver James McGuire was forced to take a drive-through penalty.

The #2 ANSA Ligier retired with engine issues on lap 51, leading to the race's third caution period. The #13 car had only just pitted and De Angelis inherited the lead as the other cars pitted under yellow. Lance Willsey lost control of his #33 ESM Ligier while warming his tyres and stalled his car on the grass, which brought his race to an end.

The #19 Performance Tech Ligier stopped at the end of pit lane on lap 60. The #25 P1 Ligier suffered a heavy crash on lap 87 when Kenton Koch lost the rear on entry to Turn 3. Koch escaped unharmed. All cars had already made their final pit stop, so the ensuing caution served to compress the field ahead of a 26-minute sprint finish.

At the final restart, the #13 car of De Angelis led from the #26 of Matthew Bell. Bell kept within two seconds of De Angelis but was unable to make an overtake, and the victory went to De Angelis and Kyle Kirkwood. The #11 car of Nico Rondet and the #40 car of Katherine Legge battled hard for the final step on the podium until, with four minutes to go, Rondet hit the back of Legge's car at Turn 15 and span.

The only non-Ligier LMP3 car in the field was the ADESS-03, the car making its racing debut at the event in the hands of the Atlantic Racing Team. Mechanical issues forced it into the pits after roughly 30 minutes of racing. After an extended repair period, the team were able to get the car out on track again just before the halfway point of the race. They used the remainder of the event as a test session and reached the finish albeit 33 laps down.

The GT4 class was controlled by the #60 and #59 KohR Ford Mustangs, the two cars holding first and second from the #22 GMG Audi R8. The Audi managed to take second place by the end of the race, but victory went to the #60 Ford of Nate Stacy, Kyle Marcelli and Dean Martin.

The TCR class became a battle between the two Audi RS3s after the #31 Rumcastle Volkswagen Golf lost two laps in the pits with a rear wing replacement. The #82 Mark Motors Audi led the class for most of the race but the #54 JDC-Miller Audi was ahead at the final restart. The #82 retook the lead with a lap and a half remaining, but the #54 car ran out of fuel anyway on the final lap. In the end, the all-Canadian entry driven by Marco Cirone and Remo Ruscitti were able to cruise to victory.

The Encore proved popular, and was renewed for a second edition in 2019.

== Classes ==
- Le Mans Prototype 3 (LMP3)
- Grand Sport (GS) (run to GT4 regulations)
- Touring Car (TCR) (run to TCR regulations)

== Entry list ==
=== LMP3 ===
Team	Car	Engine	No.	Drivers
(United States) ANSA Motorsports	Ligier JS P3	Nissan VK50VE 5.0L V8	2	(United States) Jon Brownson
(United States) ANSA Motorsports	Ligier JS P3	Nissan VK50VE 5.0L V8	2	(United States) Dakota Dickerson
(United States) ANSA Motorsports	Ligier JS P3	Nissan VK50VE 5.0L V8	2	(United States) Neil Alberico
(United States) ANSA Motorsports	Ligier JS P3	Nissan VK50VE 5.0L V8	4	(Canada) Dean Baker
(United States) ANSA Motorsports	Ligier JS P3	Nissan VK50VE 5.0L V8	4	(Canada) Michal Chlumecky
(United States) ANSA Motorsports	Ligier JS P3	Nissan VK50VE 5.0L V8	4	(Canada) Zacharie Robichon
(United States) ANSA Motorsports	Ligier JS P3	Nissan VK50VE 5.0L V8	13	(Canada) Roman De Angelis
(United States) ANSA Motorsports	Ligier JS P3	Nissan VK50VE 5.0L V8	13	(United States) Kyle Kirkwood
(Canada) Atlantic Racing Team	ADESS-03	Nissan VK50VE 5.0L V8	6	(Switzerland) Jim Antunes
(Canada) Atlantic Racing Team	ADESS-03	Nissan VK50VE 5.0L V8	6	(United States) Tazio Ottis
(Canada) Atlantic Racing Team	ADESS-03	Nissan VK50VE 5.0L V8	6	(United Kingdom) Robin Shute
(United States) Simraceway Motorsports	Ligier JS P3	Nissan VK50VE 5.0L V8	11	(France) Nico Rondet
(United States) Simraceway Motorsports	Ligier JS P3	Nissan VK50VE 5.0L V8	11	(United States) Maurice Smith
(United States) Simraceway Motorsports	Ligier JS P3	Nissan VK50VE 5.0L V8	11	(United States) John Schauerman
(United States) Performance Tech Motorsports	Ligier JS P3	Nissan VK50VE 5.0L V8	19	(Canada) Bradley Baker
(United States) Performance Tech Motorsports	Ligier JS P3	Nissan VK50VE 5.0L V8	19	(Belgium) Jan Heylen
(United States) Performance Tech Motorsports	Ligier JS P3	Nissan VK50VE 5.0L V8	19	(Brazil) Bruno Junqueira
(United States) P1 Motorsports	Ligier JS P3	Nissan VK50VE 5.0L V8	25	(United States) Joel Janco
(United States) P1 Motorsports	Ligier JS P3	Nissan VK50VE 5.0L V8	25	(Brazil) Jonatan Jorge
(United States) P1 Motorsports	Ligier JS P3	Nissan VK50VE 5.0L V8	25	(United States) Kenton Koch
(United States) K2R Motorsports	Ligier JS P3	Nissan VK50VE 5.0L V8	26	(United Kingdom) Matthew Bell
(United States) K2R Motorsports	Ligier JS P3	Nissan VK50VE 5.0L V8	26	(United States) James McGuire Jr
(United States) K2R Motorsports	Ligier JS P3	Nissan VK50VE 5.0L V8	26	(Netherlands) Kay van Berlo
(United States) K2R Motorsports	Ligier JS P3	Nissan VK50VE 5.0L V8	64	(United States) Alex Barron
(United States) K2R Motorsports	Ligier JS P3	Nissan VK50VE 5.0L V8	64	(United States) Naveen Rao
(United States) Extreme Speed Motorsports	Ligier JS P3	Nissan VK50VE 5.0L V8	33	(United States) Max Hanratty
(United States) Extreme Speed Motorsports	Ligier JS P3	Nissan VK50VE 5.0L V8	33	(United States) Lance Willsey
(United States) Polestar Motor Racing Inc.	Ligier JS P3	Nissan VK50VE 5.0L V8	40	(United States) David Grant
(United States) Polestar Motor Racing Inc.	Ligier JS P3	Nissan VK50VE 5.0L V8	40	(United States) Keith Grant
(United States) Polestar Motor Racing Inc.	Ligier JS P3	Nissan VK50VE 5.0L V8	40	(United Kingdom) Katherine Legge
(United States) JDC-Miller Motorsports	Ligier JS P3	Nissan VK50VE 5.0L V8	84	(United States) Guy Cosmo
(United States) JDC-Miller Motorsports	Ligier JS P3	Nissan VK50VE 5.0L V8	84	(United States) Patrick Byrne

=== Grand Sport ===
Team	Car	Engine	No.	Drivers
(United States) GMG Racing	Audi R8 LMS GT4	Audi 5.2 L V10	22	(United States) Jason Bell
(United States) GMG Racing	Audi R8 LMS GT4	Audi 5.2 L V10	22	(United States) James Sofronas
(United States) GMG Racing	Audi R8 LMS GT4	Audi 5.2 L V10	22	(United States) Andy Lally
(United States) KohR Motorsports	Ford Mustang GT4	Ford 5.0 L Coyote V8	59	(United States) Rod Randall
(United States) KohR Motorsports	Ford Mustang GT4	Ford 5.0 L Coyote V8	59	(Canada) Kenny Wilden
(United States) KohR Motorsports	Ford Mustang GT4	Ford 5.0 L Coyote V8	59	(United States) DJ Randall
(United States) KohR Motorsports	Ford Mustang GT4	Ford 5.0 L Coyote V8	60	(Canada) Kyle Marcelli
(United States) KohR Motorsports	Ford Mustang GT4	Ford 5.0 L Coyote V8	60	(United States) Dean Martin
(United States) KohR Motorsports	Ford Mustang GT4	Ford 5.0 L Coyote V8	60	(United States) Nate Stacy
(United States) NOLAsport	Porsche Cayman GT4 Clubsport MR	Porsche 3.8 L Flat-6	72	(United States) Jason Hart
(United States) NOLAsport	Porsche Cayman GT4 Clubsport MR	Porsche 3.8 L Flat-6	72	(United States) Matt Travis
(United States) NOLAsport	Porsche Cayman GT4 Clubsport MR	Porsche 3.8 L Flat-6	72	(United States) Mike Vess
(United States) Carbahn Motorsports	Audi R8 LMS GT4	Audi 5.2 L V10	93	(United States) Sameer Gandhi
(United States) Carbahn Motorsports	Audi R8 LMS GT4	Audi 5.2 L V10	93	(United States) Mark Siegal
(United States) Carbahn Motorsports	Audi R8 LMS GT4	Audi 5.2 L V10	93	(United States) Jeff Westphal

=== Touring Car ===
Team	Car	Engine	No.	Drivers
(United States) Rumcastle, LLC	Volkswagen Golf GTI TCR	Volkswagen 2.0 L I4 T/C	31	(United States) Luke Rumburg
(United States) Rumcastle, LLC	Volkswagen Golf GTI TCR	Volkswagen 2.0 L I4 T/C	31	(United States) Tanner Rumburg
(United States) JDC-Miller Motorsports	Audi RS 3 LMS TCR	Audi 2.0 L TFSI	54	(United States) Michael Johnson
(United States) JDC-Miller Motorsports	Audi RS 3 LMS TCR	Audi 2.0 L TFSI	54	(South Africa) Stephen Simpson
(Canada) Mark Motors Racing	Audi RS 3 LMS TCR	Audi 2.0 L TFSI	82	(Canada) Marco Cirone
(Canada) Mark Motors Racing	Audi RS 3 LMS TCR	Audi 2.0 L TFSI	82	(Canada) Remo Ruscitti

== Race results ==
Class winners denoted in bold and with ‡

Pos	Class	No.	Team / Entrant	Drivers	Chassis	Laps	Time/Retired
Pos	Class	No.	Team / Entrant	Drivers	Engine	Laps	Time/Retired
1	**LMP3**	**13**	**(United States) ANSA Motorsports**	**(Canada) Roman De Angelis (United States) Kyle Kirkwood**	**Ligier JS P3**	**107**	**4:01:53.298‡**
1	**LMP3**	**13**	**(United States) ANSA Motorsports**	**(Canada) Roman De Angelis (United States) Kyle Kirkwood**	**Nissan VK50VE 5.0L V8**	**107**	**4:01:53.298‡**
2	LMP3	26	(United States) K2R Motorsports	(United States) James McGuire Jr (United Kingdom) Matthew Bell (Netherlands) Kay van Berlo	Ligier JS P3	107	+2.278
2	LMP3	26	(United States) K2R Motorsports	(United States) James McGuire Jr (United Kingdom) Matthew Bell (Netherlands) Kay van Berlo	Nissan VK50VE 5.0L V8	107	+2.278
3	LMP3	40	(United States) Polestar Motor Racing Inc.	(United States) Keith Grant (United States) David Grant (United Kingdom) Katherine Legge	Ligier JS P3	107	+22.356
3	LMP3	40	(United States) Polestar Motor Racing Inc.	(United States) Keith Grant (United States) David Grant (United Kingdom) Katherine Legge	Nissan VK50VE 5.0L V8	107	+22.356
4	LMP3	11	(United States) Simraceway Motorsports	(United States) Maurice Smith (United States) John Schauerman (France) Nico Rondet	Ligier JS P3	107	+46.180
4	LMP3	11	(United States) Simraceway Motorsports	(United States) Maurice Smith (United States) John Schauerman (France) Nico Rondet	Nissan VK50VE 5.0L V8	107	+46.180
5	LMP3	64	(United States) K2R Motorsports	(United States) Naveen Rao (United States) Alex Barron	Ligier JS P3	106	+1 Lap
5	LMP3	64	(United States) K2R Motorsports	(United States) Naveen Rao (United States) Alex Barron	Nissan VK50VE 5.0L V8	106	+1 Lap
6	LMP3	84	(United States) JDC-Miller Motorsports	(United States) Patrick Byrne (United States) Guy Cosmo	Ligier JS P3	106	+1 Lap
6	LMP3	84	(United States) JDC-Miller Motorsports	(United States) Patrick Byrne (United States) Guy Cosmo	Nissan VK50VE 5.0L V8	106	+1 Lap
7	**GT4**	**60**	**(United States) KohR Motorsports**	**(United States) Nate Stacy (Canada) Kyle Marcelli (United States) Dean Martin**	**Ford Mustang GT4**	**99**	**+8 Laps‡**
7	**GT4**	**60**	**(United States) KohR Motorsports**	**(United States) Nate Stacy (Canada) Kyle Marcelli (United States) Dean Martin**	**Ford 5.0 L Coyote V8**	**99**	**+8 Laps‡**
8	GT4	22	(United States) GMG Racing	(United States) Jason Bell (United States) James Sofronas (United States) Andy Lally	Audi R8 LMS GT4	99	+8 Laps
8	GT4	22	(United States) GMG Racing	(United States) Jason Bell (United States) James Sofronas (United States) Andy Lally	Audi 5.2 L V10	99	+8 Laps
9	**TCR**	**82**	**(Canada) Mark Motors Racing**	**(Canada) Marco Cirone (Canada) Remo Ruscitti**	**Audi RS 3 LMS TCR**	**99**	**+8 Laps‡**
9	**TCR**	**82**	**(Canada) Mark Motors Racing**	**(Canada) Marco Cirone (Canada) Remo Ruscitti**	**Audi 2.0 L TFSI**	**99**	**+8 Laps‡**
10 DNF	TCR	54	(United States) JDC-Miller Motorsports	(United States) Michael Johnson (South Africa) Stephen Simpson	Audi RS 3 LMS TCR	98	Out of fuel
10 DNF	TCR	54	(United States) JDC-Miller Motorsports	(United States) Michael Johnson (South Africa) Stephen Simpson	Audi 2.0 L TFSI	98	Out of fuel
11	GT4	59	(United States) KohR Motorsports	(Canada) Kenny Wilden (United States) Rod Randall (United States) DJ Randall	Ford Mustang GT4	98	+9 Laps
11	GT4	59	(United States) KohR Motorsports	(Canada) Kenny Wilden (United States) Rod Randall (United States) DJ Randall	Ford 5.0 L Coyote V8	98	+9 Laps
12	TCR	31	(United States) Rumcastle, LLC	(United States) Luke Rumburg (United States) Tanner Rumburg	Volkswagen Golf GTI TCR	97	+10 Laps
12	TCR	31	(United States) Rumcastle, LLC	(United States) Luke Rumburg (United States) Tanner Rumburg	Volkswagen 2.0 L I4 T/C	97	+10 Laps
13 DNF	LMP3	4	(United States) ANSA Motorsports	(Canada) Dean Baker (Canada) Zacharie Robichon (Canada) Michal Chlumecky	Ligier JS P3	94	
13 DNF	LMP3	4	(United States) ANSA Motorsports	(Canada) Dean Baker (Canada) Zacharie Robichon (Canada) Michal Chlumecky	Nissan VK50VE 5.0L V8	94	
14 DNF	LMP3	25	(United States) P1 Motorsports	(United States) Kenton Koch (United States) Joel Janco (Brazil) Jonatan Jorge	Ligier JS P3	87	Accident
14 DNF	LMP3	25	(United States) P1 Motorsports	(United States) Kenton Koch (United States) Joel Janco (Brazil) Jonatan Jorge	Nissan VK50VE 5.0L V8	87	Accident
15	LMP3	6	(Canada) Atlantic Racing Team	(United Kingdom) Robin Shute (Switzerland) Jim Antunes (United States) Tazio Ottis	ADESS-03	74	+33 Laps
15	LMP3	6	(Canada) Atlantic Racing Team	(United Kingdom) Robin Shute (Switzerland) Jim Antunes (United States) Tazio Ottis	Nissan VK50VE 5.0L V8	74	+33 Laps
16 DNF	LMP3	33	(United States) Extreme Speed Motorsports	(United States) Lance Willsey (United States) Max Hanratty	Ligier JS P3	67	Stalled
16 DNF	LMP3	33	(United States) Extreme Speed Motorsports	(United States) Lance Willsey (United States) Max Hanratty	Nissan VK50VE 5.0L V8	67	Stalled
17 DNF	LMP3	19	(United States) Performance Tech Motorsports	(Canada) Bradley Baker (Belgium) Jan Heylen (Brazil) Bruno Junqueira	Ligier JS P3	60	
17 DNF	LMP3	19	(United States) Performance Tech Motorsports	(Canada) Bradley Baker (Belgium) Jan Heylen (Brazil) Bruno Junqueira	Nissan VK50VE 5.0L V8	60	
18 DNF	LMP3	2	(United States) ANSA Motorsports	(United States) Jon Brownson (United States) Dakota Dickerson (United States) Neil Alberico	Ligier JS P3	51	Engine
18 DNF	LMP3	2	(United States) ANSA Motorsports	(United States) Jon Brownson (United States) Dakota Dickerson (United States) Neil Alberico	Nissan VK50VE 5.0L V8	51	Engine
19 DNF	GT4	72	(United States) NOLAsport	(United States) Mike Vess (United States) Matt Travis (United States) Jason Hart	Porsche Cayman GT4 Clubsport MR	30	
19 DNF	GT4	72	(United States) NOLAsport	(United States) Mike Vess (United States) Matt Travis (United States) Jason Hart	Porsche 3.8 L Flat-6	30	
20	GT4	93	(United States) Carbahn Motorsports	(United States) Sameer Gandhi (United States) Mark Siegal (United States) Jeff Westphal	Audi R8 LMS GT4	95	+12 Laps
20	GT4	93	(United States) Carbahn Motorsports	(United States) Sameer Gandhi (United States) Mark Siegal (United States) Jeff Westphal	Audi 5.2 L V10	95	+12 Laps
BOX SCORE

The #93 Carbhan Motorsports Audi R8 LMS GT4 was moved to the rear of its class for failing to meet the minimum required driving time.
