= 2015–16 Asian Le Mans Series =

Seasons
- ← 2014 2016–17 →

The 2015–16 Asian Le Mans Series was the fourth season of the Automobile Club de l'Ouest's Asian Le Mans Series. It is the fourth 24 Hours of Le Mans-based series created by the ACO, following the American Le Mans Series (since merged with the Rolex Sports Car Series to form the United SportsCar Championship), the European Le Mans Series and the FIA World Endurance Championship. The four event season began at the Fuji Speedway on 10 October 2015 and ended at Sepang International Circuit in Selangor on 24 January 2016.

This would mark the first season of the Asian Le Mans Series to be organized by the ACO after taking over from the Chinese S2M Group due from since relaunched in 2013 to overcome and bring up from struggling car grid counts in all of the classes.

== Calendar ==
The 2015 calendar was revealed on 12 February 2015. An updated race calendar was released on 20 April 2015, which added the round at Buriram and rescheduled the Sepang round, before a further revised calendar cancelled the planned event at Shanghai International Circuit and replaced it with a second race in Sepang. The Fuji round was held alongside the FIA World Endurance Championship.

Rnd	Race	Circuit	Date
1	2 Hours of Fuji	Fuji Speedway, Oyama, Japan	10 October 2015
2	3 Hours of Sepang I	Sepang International Circuit, Selangor, Malaysia	8 November 2015
3	3 Hours of Thailand	Chang International Circuit, Buriram, Thailand	10 January 2016
4	3 Hours of Sepang II	Sepang International Circuit, Selangor, Malaysia	24 January 2016

== Entry list ==
All entries use Michelin tyres.

=== LMP2 ===
Entrant/Team	Car	Engine	Class	No.	Drivers	Rounds
(Switzerland) Race Performance	Oreca 03R	Judd HK 3.6 L V8	P2	8	(Switzerland) Nicolas Leutwiler	All
(Switzerland) Race Performance	Oreca 03R	Judd HK 3.6 L V8	P2	8	(Japan) Shinji Nakano	1–2
(Switzerland) Race Performance	Oreca 03R	Judd HK 3.6 L V8	P2	8	(United Kingdom) Oliver Webb	3–4
(Indonesia) Jagonya Ayam with Eurasia	Oreca 03R	Nissan VK45DE 4.5 L V8	P2	9	(Indonesia) Sean Gelael	3–4
(Indonesia) Jagonya Ayam with Eurasia	Oreca 03R	Nissan VK45DE 4.5 L V8	P2	9	(Italy) Antonio Giovinazzi	3–4
(Portugal) Algarve Pro Racing	Ligier JS P2	Nissan VK45DE 4.5 L V8	P2	25	(Australia) Dean Koutsoumidis	2–4
(Portugal) Algarve Pro Racing	Ligier JS P2	Nissan VK45DE 4.5 L V8	P2	25	(United Kingdom) Michael Munemann	2–4
(Portugal) Algarve Pro Racing	Ligier JS P2	Nissan VK45DE 4.5 L V8	P2	25	(United Kingdom) James Winslow	2–4
(Philippines) Eurasia Motorsport	Oreca 03R	Nissan VK45DE 4.5 L V8	P2	99	(Hong Kong) William Lok	All
(Philippines) Eurasia Motorsport	Oreca 03R	Nissan VK45DE 4.5 L V8	P2	99	(South Korea) Tacksung Kim	1–2, 4
(Philippines) Eurasia Motorsport	Oreca 03R	Nissan VK45DE 4.5 L V8	P2	99	(France) Tristan Gommendy	1
(Philippines) Eurasia Motorsport	Oreca 03R	Nissan VK45DE 4.5 L V8	P2	99	(United Kingdom) Richard Bradley	2–4
(Philippines) Eurasia Motorsport	Oreca 03R	Nissan VK45DE 4.5 L V8	P2	99	(Netherlands) Nick de Bruijn	3

Icon	Class
P2	LMP2

=== LMP3 ===
Entrant/Team	Car	Engine	Class	No.	Drivers	Rounds
(China) DC Racing	Ligier JS P3	Nissan VK50VE 5.0 L V8	P3	1	(China) David Cheng	All
(China) DC Racing	Ligier JS P3	Nissan VK50VE 5.0 L V8	P3	1	(China) Ho-Pin Tung	All
(China) DC Racing	Ligier JS P3	Nissan VK50VE 5.0 L V8	P3	1	(France) Thomas Laurent	2–4
(Chinese Taipei) Team AAI	ADESS-03	Nissan VK50VE 5.0 L V8	P3	88	(Japan) Tatsuya Tanigawa	1, 3
(Chinese Taipei) Team AAI	ADESS-03	Nissan VK50VE 5.0 L V8	P3	88	(China) Peter Li	1
(Chinese Taipei) Team AAI	ADESS-03	Nissan VK50VE 5.0 L V8	P3	88	(Japan) Ryohei Sakaguchi	1
(Chinese Taipei) Team AAI	ADESS-03	Nissan VK50VE 5.0 L V8	P3	88	(China) Chen Junrong	3
(Chinese Taipei) Team AAI	ADESS-03	Nissan VK50VE 5.0 L V8	P3	88	(China) Chen Siyu	3
(Chinese Taipei) Team AAI	ADESS-03	Nissan VK50VE 5.0 L V8	P3	89	(Japan) Masataka Yanagida	All
(Chinese Taipei) Team AAI	ADESS-03	Nissan VK50VE 5.0 L V8	P3	89	(Chinese Taipei) Terry Fang	1
(Chinese Taipei) Team AAI	ADESS-03	Nissan VK50VE 5.0 L V8	P3	89	(Japan) Takamitsu Matsui	1
(Chinese Taipei) Team AAI	ADESS-03	Nissan VK50VE 5.0 L V8	P3	89	(United Kingdom) Ollie Hancock	2
(Chinese Taipei) Team AAI	ADESS-03	Nissan VK50VE 5.0 L V8	P3	89	(United Kingdom) Alex Kapadia	2
(Chinese Taipei) Team AAI	ADESS-03	Nissan VK50VE 5.0 L V8	P3	89	(Japan) Ryohei Sakaguchi	3
(Chinese Taipei) Team AAI	ADESS-03	Nissan VK50VE 5.0 L V8	P3	89	(Thailand) Tanart Sathienthirakul	3
(Chinese Taipei) Team AAI	ADESS-03	Nissan VK50VE 5.0 L V8	P3	89	(China) Chen Siyu	4
(Chinese Taipei) Team AAI	ADESS-03	Nissan VK50VE 5.0 L V8	P3	89	(China) Lam Yu	4

Icon	Class
P3	LMP3

=== CN ===
Entrant/Team	Car	Engine	Class	No.	Drivers	Rounds
(Italy) Avelon Formula	Wolf GB08	Honda K20A 2.0 L I4	CN	21	(Singapore) Denis Lian	2–4
(Italy) Avelon Formula	Wolf GB08	Honda K20A 2.0 L I4	CN	21	(Switzerland) Giorgio Maggi	2–4
(Canada) Atlantic Racing Team	Wolf GB08	Honda K20A 2.0 L I4	CN	69	(Malaysia) Zen Low	2–4
(Canada) Atlantic Racing Team	Wolf GB08	Honda K20A 2.0 L I4	CN	69	(Sweden) John Bryant-Meisner	2
(Canada) Atlantic Racing Team	Wolf GB08	Honda K20A 2.0 L I4	CN	69	(Japan) Toshiyuki Ochiai	2
(Canada) Atlantic Racing Team	Wolf GB08	Honda K20A 2.0 L I4	CN	69	(Japan) Shinyo Sano	3–4

Icon	Class
CN	CN

=== GT ===
Entrant/Team	Car	Engine	Class	No.	Drivers	Rounds
(Singapore) Clearwater Racing	McLaren 650S GT3	McLaren M838T 3.8 L Twin-turbo V8	GT	3	(United Kingdom) Rob Bell	All
(Singapore) Clearwater Racing	McLaren 650S GT3	McLaren M838T 3.8 L Twin-turbo V8	GT	3	(Japan) Keita Sawa	All
(Singapore) Clearwater Racing	McLaren 650S GT3	McLaren M838T 3.8 L Twin-turbo V8	GT	3	(Singapore) Weng Sun Mok	All
(China) / Absolute Racing (Note: 1. 5 entered as Absolute Racing and #6 and #66 entered as Bentley Team Absolute.); (China) / Bentley Team Absolute	Audi R8 LMS Ultra 1–2; Audi R8 LMS 3–4	Audi DAR 5.2 L V10	GT	5	(Chinese Taipei) Jeffrey Lee	All
(China) / Absolute Racing; (China) / Bentley Team Absolute	Audi R8 LMS Ultra 1–2; Audi R8 LMS 3–4	Audi DAR 5.2 L V10	GT	5	(Hong Kong) Shaun Thong	1
(China) / Absolute Racing; (China) / Bentley Team Absolute	Audi R8 LMS Ultra 1–2; Audi R8 LMS 3–4	Audi DAR 5.2 L V10	GT	5	(Malaysia) Alex Yoong	1
(China) / Absolute Racing; (China) / Bentley Team Absolute	Audi R8 LMS Ultra 1–2; Audi R8 LMS 3–4	Audi DAR 5.2 L V10	GT	5	(Belgium) Alessio Picariello	2–4
(China) / Absolute Racing; (China) / Bentley Team Absolute	Audi R8 LMS Ultra 1–2; Audi R8 LMS 3–4	Audi DAR 5.2 L V10	GT	5	(South Korea) Andrew Kim	2
(China) / Absolute Racing; (China) / Bentley Team Absolute	Audi R8 LMS Ultra 1–2; Audi R8 LMS 3–4	Audi DAR 5.2 L V10	GT	5	(Hong Kong) Adderly Fong	3
(China) / Absolute Racing; (China) / Bentley Team Absolute	Audi R8 LMS Ultra 1–2; Audi R8 LMS 3–4	Audi DAR 5.2 L V10	GT	5	(Germany) Christopher Mies	4
(China) / Absolute Racing; (China) / Bentley Team Absolute	Bentley Continental GT3	Bentley EA824 4.0 L Twin-turbo V8	GT	6	(Hong Kong) Adderly Fong	4
(China) / Absolute Racing; (China) / Bentley Team Absolute	Bentley Continental GT3	Bentley EA824 4.0 L Twin-turbo V8	GT	6	(United States) Andrew Palmer	4
(China) / Absolute Racing; (China) / Bentley Team Absolute	Bentley Continental GT3	Bentley EA824 4.0 L Twin-turbo V8	GT	66	(South Korea) Andrew Kim	4
(China) / Absolute Racing; (China) / Bentley Team Absolute	Bentley Continental GT3	Bentley EA824 4.0 L Twin-turbo V8	GT	66	(Thailand) Tanart Sathienthirakul	4
(China) / Absolute Racing; (China) / Bentley Team Absolute	Bentley Continental GT3	Bentley EA824 4.0 L Twin-turbo V8	GT	66	(Australia) Jonathan Venter	4
(Slovakia) ARC Bratislava	Audi R8 LMS Ultra	Audi DAR 5.2 L V10	GT	7	(Slovakia) Miroslav Konôpka	All
(Slovakia) ARC Bratislava	Audi R8 LMS Ultra	Audi DAR 5.2 L V10	GT	7	(Germany) Pierre Kaffer	1
(Slovakia) ARC Bratislava	Audi R8 LMS Ultra	Audi DAR 5.2 L V10	GT	7	(Malaysia) Fairuz Fauzy	2–4
(Slovakia) ARC Bratislava	Audi R8 LMS Ultra	Audi DAR 5.2 L V10	GT	7	(Malaysia) Afiq Yazid	4
(Malaysia) Nexus Infinity	Ferrari 458 Italia GT3	Ferrari F136 4.5 L V8	GT	27	(Malaysia) Dominic Ang	All
(Malaysia) Nexus Infinity	Ferrari 458 Italia GT3	Ferrari F136 4.5 L V8	GT	27	(Australia) Joshua Hunt	All
(Malaysia) Nexus Infinity	Ferrari 458 Italia GT3	Ferrari F136 4.5 L V8	GT	27	(Malaysia) Adrian D'Silva	4
(Switzerland) Spirit of Race	Ferrari 458 Italia GT3	Ferrari F136 4.5 L V8	GT	38	(Singapore) Nasrat Muzayyin	All
(Switzerland) Spirit of Race	Ferrari 458 Italia GT3	Ferrari F136 4.5 L V8	GT	38	(Portugal) Rui Águas	1–2
(Switzerland) Spirit of Race	Ferrari 458 Italia GT3	Ferrari F136 4.5 L V8	GT	38	(United Kingdom) Aaron Scott	3–4
(Switzerland) Spirit of Race	Ferrari 458 Italia GT3	Ferrari F136 4.5 L V8	GT	38	(Italy) Marco Cioci	4
(Hong Kong) KCMG	Porsche 997 GT3 Cup	Porsche 4.0 L Flat-6	GT Am	51	(Hong Kong) Paul Ip	All
(Hong Kong) KCMG	Porsche 997 GT3 Cup	Porsche 4.0 L Flat-6	GT Am	51	(Germany) Christian Ried	1–2
(Hong Kong) KCMG	Porsche 997 GT3 Cup	Porsche 4.0 L Flat-6	GT Am	51	(New Zealand) James Munro	1
(Hong Kong) KCMG	Porsche 997 GT3 Cup	Porsche 4.0 L Flat-6	GT Am	51	(United Kingdom) Dan Wells	2
(Hong Kong) KCMG	Porsche 997 GT3 Cup	Porsche 4.0 L Flat-6	GT Am	51	(China) Yuan Bo	3–4
(Hong Kong) KCMG	Porsche 997 GT3 Cup	Porsche 4.0 L Flat-6	GT Am	51	(Estonia) Martin Rump	3
(Hong Kong) KCMG	Porsche 997 GT3 Cup	Porsche 4.0 L Flat-6	GT Am	51	(Malaysia) Akash Nandy	4
(Hong Kong) Team Starspeed Racing	Lamborghini Huracán Super Trofeo	Lamborghini DGF 5.2 L V10	GT Am	77	(Hong Kong) Chong Yau Wong	4
(Hong Kong) Team Starspeed Racing	Lamborghini Huracán Super Trofeo	Lamborghini DGF 5.2 L V10	GT Am	77	(South Korea) Rick Yoon	4
(Chinese Taipei) / Team AAI (Note: 1. 90, #91, #93 entered as Team AAI and #92 entered as Team AAI - HubAuto.); (Chinese Taipei) / Team AAI - HubAuto	Mercedes-Benz SLS AMG GT3	Mercedes-AMG M159 6.2 L V8	GT	90	(Japan) Tatsuya Tanigawa	2
(Chinese Taipei) / Team AAI; (Chinese Taipei) / Team AAI - HubAuto	Mercedes-Benz SLS AMG GT3	Mercedes-AMG M159 6.2 L V8	GT	90	(China) Lam Yu	2
(Chinese Taipei) / Team AAI; (Chinese Taipei) / Team AAI - HubAuto	BMW Z4 GT3	BMW P65B44 4.4 L V8	GT	91	(Chinese Taipei) Jun-San Chen	All
(Chinese Taipei) / Team AAI; (Chinese Taipei) / Team AAI - HubAuto	BMW Z4 GT3	BMW P65B44 4.4 L V8	GT	91	(United Kingdom) Ollie Millroy	All
(Chinese Taipei) / Team AAI; (Chinese Taipei) / Team AAI - HubAuto	BMW Z4 GT3	BMW P65B44 4.4 L V8	GT	91	(Japan) Nobuteru Taniguchi	1, 3–4
(Chinese Taipei) / Team AAI; (Chinese Taipei) / Team AAI - HubAuto	BMW Z4 GT3	BMW P65B44 4.4 L V8	GT	91	(Germany) Dirk Müller	2
(Chinese Taipei) / Team AAI; (Chinese Taipei) / Team AAI - HubAuto	BMW Z4 GT3 1–2; Mercedes-Benz SLS AMG GT3 3–4	BMW P65B44 4.4 L V8 1–2; Mercedes-AMG M159 6.2 L V8 3–4	GT	92	(Chinese Taipei) Han-Chen Chen	All
(Chinese Taipei) / Team AAI; (Chinese Taipei) / Team AAI - HubAuto	BMW Z4 GT3 1–2; Mercedes-Benz SLS AMG GT3 3–4	BMW P65B44 4.4 L V8 1–2; Mercedes-AMG M159 6.2 L V8 3–4	GT	92	(Japan) Shinya Hosokawa	All
(Chinese Taipei) / Team AAI; (Chinese Taipei) / Team AAI - HubAuto	BMW Z4 GT3 1–2; Mercedes-Benz SLS AMG GT3 3–4	BMW P65B44 4.4 L V8 1–2; Mercedes-AMG M159 6.2 L V8 3–4	GT	92	(Japan) Hiroki Yoshimoto	All
(Chinese Taipei) / Team AAI; (Chinese Taipei) / Team AAI - HubAuto	McLaren MP4-12C GT3	McLaren M838T 3.8 L Twin-turbo V8	GT	93	(Japan) Shunsuke Kohno	4
(Chinese Taipei) / Team AAI; (Chinese Taipei) / Team AAI - HubAuto	McLaren MP4-12C GT3	McLaren M838T 3.8 L Twin-turbo V8	GT	93	(Japan) Tatsuya Tanigawa	4

Icon	Class
GT	GT3
GT Am	GT3 Am

== Results ==
Bold indicates overall winner.

Rnd.	Circuit	LMP2 Winning Team	LMP3 Winning Team	CN Winning Team	GT Winning Team	GT Am Winning Team	Results
Rnd.	Circuit	LMP2 Winning Drivers	LMP3 Winning Drivers	CN Winning Drivers	GT Winning Drivers	GT Am Winning Drivers	Results
1	Fuji	(Switzerland) **#8 Race Performance**	(China) #1 DC Racing	No entries	(Singapore) #3 Clearwater Racing	(Hong Kong) #51 KCMG	Report
1	Fuji	(Switzerland) **Nicolas Leutwiler** **(Japan) Shinji Nakano**	(China) David Cheng (China) Ho-Pin Tung	No entries	(United Kingdom) Rob Bell (Japan) Keita Sawa (Singapore) Weng Sun Mok	(Hong Kong) Paul Ip (New Zealand) James Munro (Germany) Christian Ried	Report
2	Sepang I	(Switzerland) **#8 Race Performance**	(China) #1 DC Racing	(Singapore) #21 Avelon Formula	(Singapore) #3 Clearwater Racing	(Hong Kong) #51 KCMG	Report
2	Sepang I	(Switzerland) **Nicolas Leutwiler** **(Japan) Shinji Nakano**	(China) David Cheng (France) Thomas Laurent (China) Ho-Pin Tung	(Singapore) Denis Lian (Switzerland) Giorgio Maggi	(United Kingdom) Rob Bell (Japan) Keita Sawa (Singapore) Weng Sun Mok	(Hong Kong) Paul Ip (Germany) Christian Ried (United Kingdom) Dan Wells	Report
3	Buriram	(Indonesia) **#9 Jagonya Ayam with Eurasia**	(China) #1 DC Racing	No finishers	(Malaysia) #27 Nexus Infinity	(Hong Kong) #51 KCMG	Report
3	Buriram	(Indonesia) **Sean Gelael** **(Italy) Antonio Giovinazzi**	(China) David Cheng (France) Thomas Laurent (China) Ho-Pin Tung	No finishers	(Malaysia) Dominic Ang (Australia) Joshua Hunt	(China) Yuan Bo (Hong Kong) Paul Ip (Estonia) Martin Rump	Report
4	Sepang II	(Indonesia) **#9 Jagonya Ayam with Eurasia**	(China) #1 DC Racing	(Singapore) #21 Avelon Formula	(China) #5 Absolute Racing	(Hong Kong) #51 KCMG	Report
4	Sepang II	(Indonesia) **Sean Gelael** **(Italy) Antonio Giovinazzi**	(China) David Cheng (France) Thomas Laurent (China) Ho-Pin Tung	(Singapore) Denis Lian (Switzerland) Giorgio Maggi	(Chinese Taipei) Jeffrey Lee (Germany) Christopher Mies (Belgium) Alessio Picariello	(China) Yuan Bo (Hong Kong) Paul Ip (Malaysia) Akash Nandy	Report

== Championship Standings ==
Championship Race points

Position	1st	2nd	3rd	4th	5th	6th	7th	8th	9th	10th	Other Classified
Points	25	18	15	12	10	8	6	4	2	1	0.5

== Teams Championships ==
=== LMP2 Teams Championship ===
Pos.	Team	Car	FUJ (Japan)	SEP I (Malaysia)	BUR (Thailand)	SEP II (Malaysia)	Total
1	(Switzerland) #8 Race Performance	Oreca 03R	**1**	1	3	2	84
2	(Portugal) #25 Algarve Pro Racing	Ligier JS P2		**2**	2	**3**	53
3	(Indonesia) #9 Jagonya Ayam with Eurasia	Oreca 03R			**1**	1	51
4	(Philippines) #99 Eurasia Motorsport	Oreca 03R	2	3	4	Ret	45

Key
Colour	Result
Gold	Race winner
Silver	2nd place
Bronze	3rd place
Green	Points finish
Blue	Non-points finish
Blue	Non-classified finish (NC)
Purple	Did not finish (Ret)
Black	Disqualified (DSQ)
Black	Excluded (EX)
White	Did not start (DNS)
White	Race cancelled (C)
White	Withdrew (WD)
Blank	Did not participate

**Bold** – Pole

=== LMP3 Teams Championship ===
Pos.	Team	Car	FUJ (Japan)	SEP I (Malaysia)	BUR (Thailand)	SEP II (Malaysia)	Total
1	(China) #1 DC Racing	Ligier JS P3	**1**	**1**	**1**	1	104
2	(Chinese Taipei) #89 Team AAI	ADESS-03	Ret	2	2	**Ret**	36
3	(Chinese Taipei) #88 Team AAI	ADESS-03	Ret		DNS		0

Key
Colour	Result
Gold	Race winner
Silver	2nd place
Bronze	3rd place
Green	Points finish
Blue	Non-points finish
Blue	Non-classified finish (NC)
Purple	Did not finish (Ret)
Black	Disqualified (DSQ)
Black	Excluded (EX)
White	Did not start (DNS)
White	Race cancelled (C)
White	Withdrew (WD)
Blank	Did not participate

**Bold** – Pole

=== CN Teams Championship ===
Pos.	Team	Car	FUJ (Japan)	SEP I (Malaysia)	BUR (Thailand)	SEP II (Malaysia)	Total
1	(Singapore) #21 Avelon Formula	Wolf GB08		1	Ret	**1**	51
2	(Canada) #69 Atlantic Racing Team	Wolf GB08		**2**	**Ret**	DNS	20

Key
Colour	Result
Gold	Race winner
Silver	2nd place
Bronze	3rd place
Green	Points finish
Blue	Non-points finish
Blue	Non-classified finish (NC)
Purple	Did not finish (Ret)
Black	Disqualified (DSQ)
Black	Excluded (EX)
White	Did not start (DNS)
White	Race cancelled (C)
White	Withdrew (WD)
Blank	Did not participate

**Bold** – Pole

=== GT Teams Championship ===
Pos.	Team	Car	FUJ (Japan)	SEP I (Malaysia)	BUR (Thailand)	SEP II (Malaysia)	Total
1	(Singapore) #3 Clearwater Racing	Mclaren 650S GT3	**1**	1	**5**	3	77
2	(China) #5 Absolute Racing	Audi R8 GT3; Audi R8 LMS	5	7	2	**1**	60
3	(Malaysia) #27 Nexus Infinity	Ferrari 458 Italia GT3	6	**5**	1	4	56
4	(Chinese Taipei) #91 Team AAI	BMW Z4 GT3	Ret	2	3	2	51
5	(Switzerland) #38 Spirit of Race	Ferrari 458 Italia GT3	2	4	7	5	46
6	(Chinese Taipei) #92 Team AAI - HubAuto	BMW Z4 GT3; Mercedes-Benz SLS AMG GT3	3	6	4	6	43
7	(Slovakia) #7 ARC Bratislava	Audi R8 LMS Ultra	4	8	6	8	28
8	(Chinese Taipei) #90 Team AAI	Mercedes-Benz SLS AMG GT3		3			15
9	(China) Bentley Team Absolute #66	Bentley Continental GT3				7	6
10	(Chinese Taipei) #93 Team AAI	Mclaren MP4-12C GT3				9	2
11	(China) #6 Bentley Team Absolute	Bentley Continental GT3				10	1

Key
Colour	Result
Gold	Race winner
Silver	2nd place
Bronze	3rd place
Green	Points finish
Blue	Non-points finish
Blue	Non-classified finish (NC)
Purple	Did not finish (Ret)
Black	Disqualified (DSQ)
Black	Excluded (EX)
White	Did not start (DNS)
White	Race cancelled (C)
White	Withdrew (WD)
Blank	Did not participate

**Bold** – Pole

=== GT Am Teams Championship ===
Pos.	Team	Car	FUJ (Japan)	SEP I (Malaysia)	BUR (Thailand)	SEP II (Malaysia)	Total
1	(Hong Kong) #51 KCMG	Porsche 997 GT3 Cup	**1**	**1**	**1**	**1**	104
2	(Hong Kong) #77 Team Starspeed Racing	Lamborghini Huracán LP 620-2 Super Trofeo				2	18

Key
Colour	Result
Gold	Race winner
Silver	2nd place
Bronze	3rd place
Green	Points finish
Blue	Non-points finish
Blue	Non-classified finish (NC)
Purple	Did not finish (Ret)
Black	Disqualified (DSQ)
Black	Excluded (EX)
White	Did not start (DNS)
White	Race cancelled (C)
White	Withdrew (WD)
Blank	Did not participate

**Bold** – Pole

== Drivers Championships ==
=== LMP2 Drivers Championship ===
Pos.	Driver	Team	FUJ (Japan)	SEP I (Malaysia)	BUR (Thailand)	SEP II (Malaysia)	Total points
1	(Switzerland) Nicolas Leutwiler	(Switzerland) Race Performance	**1**	**1**	3	2	84
2	Michael Munemann	Algarve Pro Racing		**2**	2	**3**	53
2	Dean Koutsoumidis	Algarve Pro Racing		**2**	2	**3**	53
2	James Winslow	Algarve Pro Racing		**2**	2	**3**	53
3	(Japan) Shinji Nakano	(Switzerland) Race Performance	**1**	**1**			52
4	(Indonesia) Sean Gelael	(Indonesia) Jagonya Ayam with Eurasia			**1**	1	51
4	(Italy) Antonio Giovinazzi	(Indonesia) Jagonya Ayam with Eurasia			**1**	1	51
5	(Hong Kong) William Lok	(Philippines) Eurasia Motorsport	2	3	4	Ret	45
6	(United Kingdom) Oliver Webb	(Switzerland) Race Performance			3	2	33
6	(South Korea) Tacksung Kim	(Philippines) Eurasia Motorsport	2	3		Ret	33
7	(United Kingdom) Richard Bradley	(Philippines) Eurasia Motorsport		3	4	Ret	27
8	(France) Tristan Gommendy	(Philippines) Eurasia Motorsport	2				18
9	(Netherlands) Nick de Bruijn	(Philippines) Eurasia Motorsport			4		12

Key
Colour	Result
Gold	Race winner
Silver	2nd place
Bronze	3rd place
Green	Points finish
Blue	Non-points finish
Blue	Non-classified finish (NC)
Purple	Did not finish (Ret)
Black	Disqualified (DSQ)
Black	Excluded (EX)
White	Did not start (DNS)
White	Race cancelled (C)
White	Withdrew (WD)
Blank	Did not participate

**Bold** – Pole

=== LMP3 Drivers Championship ===
Pos.	Driver	Team	FUJ (Japan)	SEP I (Malaysia)	BUR (Thailand)	SEP II (Malaysia)	Total points
1	(China) David Cheng	(China) DC Racing	**1**	**1**	**1**	1	103
1	(China) Ho-Pin Tung	(China) DC Racing	**1**	**1**	**1**	1	103
2	(France) Thomas Laurent	(China) DC Racing		**1**	**1**	1	77
3	(Japan) Masataka Yanagida	(Chinese Taipei) Team AAI	Ret	2	2	**Ret**	37
4	(United Kingdom) Alex Kapadia	(Chinese Taipei) Team AAI		2			18
4	(United Kingdom) Ollie Hancock	(Chinese Taipei) Team AAI		2			18
4	(Japan) Ryohei Sakaguchi	(Chinese Taipei) Team AAI	Ret		2		18
4	(Thailand) Tanart Sathienthirakul	(Chinese Taipei) Team AAI			2		18
5	(China) Chen Siyu	(Chinese Taipei) Team AAI			DNS	**Ret**	1
5	(China) Lam Yu	(Chinese Taipei) Team AAI				**Ret**	1
6	(Japan) Tatsuya Tanigawa	(Chinese Taipei) Team AAI	Ret		DNS		0
6	(China) Zhi Cong Li	(Chinese Taipei) Team AAI	Ret				0
6	(Chinese Taipei) Terry Fang	(Chinese Taipei) Team AAI	Ret				0
6	(Japan) Takamitsu Matsui	(Chinese Taipei) Team AAI	Ret				0
6	(China) Chen Junrong	(Chinese Taipei) Team AAI			DNS		0

Key
Colour	Result
Gold	Race winner
Silver	2nd place
Bronze	3rd place
Green	Points finish
Blue	Non-points finish
Blue	Non-classified finish (NC)
Purple	Did not finish (Ret)
Black	Disqualified (DSQ)
Black	Excluded (EX)
White	Did not start (DNS)
White	Race cancelled (C)
White	Withdrew (WD)
Blank	Did not participate

**Bold** – Pole

=== CN Drivers Championship ===
Pos.	Driver	Team	FUJ (Japan)	SEP I (Malaysia)	BUR (Thailand)	SEP II (Malaysia)	Total points
1	(Singapore) Denis Lian	(Singapore) Avelon Formula		1	Ret	**1**	51
1	(Switzerland) Giorgio Maggi	(Singapore) Avelon Formula		1	Ret	**1**	51
2	(Malaysia) Zen Low	(Canada) Atlantic Racing Team		**2**	**Ret**	DNS	20
3	(Sweden) John Bryant-Meisner	(Canada) Atlantic Racing Team		**2**			19
3	(Japan) Toshiyuki Ochiai	(Canada) Atlantic Racing Team		**2**			19
4	(Japan) Shinyo Sano	(Canada) Atlantic Racing Team			**Ret**	DNS	1

Key
Colour	Result
Gold	Race winner
Silver	2nd place
Bronze	3rd place
Green	Points finish
Blue	Non-points finish
Blue	Non-classified finish (NC)
Purple	Did not finish (Ret)
Black	Disqualified (DSQ)
Black	Excluded (EX)
White	Did not start (DNS)
White	Race cancelled (C)
White	Withdrew (WD)
Blank	Did not participate

**Bold** – Pole

=== GT Drivers Championship ===
Pos.	Driver	Team	FUJ (Japan)	SEP I (Malaysia)	BUR (Thailand)	SEP II (Malaysia)	Total points
1	(Singapore) Weng Sun Mok	(Singapore) Clearwater Racing	**1**	**1**	**5**	3	78
1	(Japan) Keita Sawa	(Singapore) Clearwater Racing	**1**	**1**	**5**	3	78
1	(United Kingdom) Rob Bell	(Singapore) Clearwater Racing	**1**	**1**	**5**	3	78
2	(Chinese Taipei) Jeffery Lee	(China) Absolute Racing	5	7	2	**1**	60
3	(Malaysia) Dominic Ang	(Malaysia) Nexus Infinity	6	5	1	4	55
3	(Australia) Joshua Hunt	(Malaysia) Nexus Infinity	6	5	1	4	55
4	(Chinese Taipei) Jun-San Chen	(Chinese Taipei) Team AAI	Ret	2	3	2	51
4	(Chinese Taipei) Ollie Millroy	(Chinese Taipei) Team AAI	Ret	2	3	2	51
5	(Belgium) Alessio Picariello	(China) Absolute Racing		7	2	**1**	50
6	(Singapore) Nasrat Muzayyin	(Switzerland) Spirit of Race	2	4	7	5	46
7	(Chinese Taipei) Han-Chen Chen	(Chinese Taipei) Team AAI - HubAuto	3	6	4	6	43
7	(Japan) Shinya Hosokawa	(Chinese Taipei) Team AAI - HubAuto	3	6	4	6	43
7	(Japan) Hiroki Yoshimoto	(Chinese Taipei) Team AAI - HubAuto	3	6	4	6	43
8	(Japan) Nobuteru Taniguchi	(Chinese Taipei) Team AAI	Ret		3	2	33
9	(Portugal) Rui Águas	(Switzerland) Spirit of Race	2	4			30
10	(Slovakia) Miroslav Konôpka	(Slovakia) ARC Bratislava	4	8	6	8	28
11	(Germany) Christopher Mies	(China) Absolute Racing				**1**	26
12	(Germany) Dirk Müller	(Chinese Taipei) Team AAI		2			18
12	(China) Adderly Fong	(China) Absolute Racing			2		18
13	(United Kingdom) Aaron Scott	(Switzerland) Spirit of Race			7	5	16
14	(China) Lam Yu	(Chinese Taipei) Team AAI		3			15
14	(Japan) Tatsuya Tanigawa	(Chinese Taipei) Team AAI		3			15
15	(Germany) Pierre Kaffer	(Slovakia) ARC Bratislava	4				12
15	(Malaysia) Fairuz Fauzy	(Slovakia) ARC Bratislava		8	6		12
16	(Malaysia) Alex Yoong	(China) Absolute Racing	5				10
16	(Hong Kong) Shaun Thong	(China) Absolute Racing	5				10
17	(South Korea) Andrew Kim	(China) Absolute Racing		7			6

Key
Colour	Result
Gold	Race winner
Silver	2nd place
Bronze	3rd place
Green	Points finish
Blue	Non-points finish
Blue	Non-classified finish (NC)
Purple	Did not finish (Ret)
Black	Disqualified (DSQ)
Black	Excluded (EX)
White	Did not start (DNS)
White	Race cancelled (C)
White	Withdrew (WD)
Blank	Did not participate

**Bold** – Pole

=== GT Am Drivers Championship ===
Pos.	Driver	Team	FUJ (Japan)	SEP I (Malaysia)	BUR (Thailand)	SEP II (Malaysia)	Total points
1	(Hong Kong) Paul Ip	(Hong Kong) KCMG	**1**	**1**	**1**	**1**	104
2	(Germany) Christian Ried	(Hong Kong) KCMG	**1**	**1**			52
2	(China) Yuan Bo	(Hong Kong) KCMG			**1**	**1**	52
3	(New Zealand) James Munro	(Hong Kong) KCMG	**1**				26
3	(United Kingdom) Dan Wells	(Hong Kong) KCMG		**1**			26
3	(Estonia) Martin Rump	(Hong Kong) KCMG			**1**		26
3	(Malaysia) Akash Nandy	(Hong Kong) KCMG				**1**	26
4	(South Korea) Rick Yoon	(Hong Kong) Team Starspeed Racing				2	18
4	(Hong Kong) Chong Yau Wong	(Hong Kong) Team Starspeed Racing				2	18

Key
Colour	Result
Gold	Race winner
Silver	2nd place
Bronze	3rd place
Green	Points finish
Blue	Non-points finish
Blue	Non-classified finish (NC)
Purple	Did not finish (Ret)
Black	Disqualified (DSQ)
Black	Excluded (EX)
White	Did not start (DNS)
White	Race cancelled (C)
White	Withdrew (WD)
Blank	Did not participate

**Bold** – Pole
