= Hiroki Yoshimoto =

Japanese race car driver (born 1980)

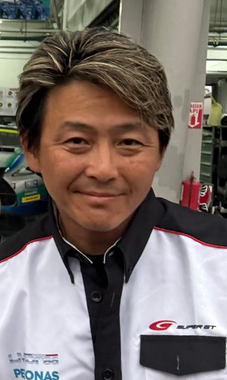
- Yoshimoto at the 2025 Super GT Malaysia Festival
- Nationality: (Japan) Japanese
- Born: 2 September 1980 (age 46) Osaka, Osaka Prefecture, Japan

World Touring Car Championship career
- Debut season: 2011
- Current team: NIKA Racing
- Categorisation: FIA Gold
- Car number: 67
- Former teams: Tuenti Racing Team
- Starts: 6
- Wins: 0
- Podiums: 0
- Poles: 0
- Fastest laps: 0
- Best finish: NC in 2011–2013

Previous series
- 2005–06 2008–09: GP2 Series; GP2 Asia Series

Daiki Yoshimoto
- Also known as: Hiroki Yoshimoto
- Born: 2 September 1980 (age 46)
- Origin: Osaka, Osaka Prefecture, Japan
- Genre: Rock
- Occupations: Vocalist, Race car driver
- Instrument: Vocalist
- Years active: 2004 - 2024
- Labels: Giza Studio, Floodlight company
- Member of: doa

Hiroki Yoshimoto (吉本 大樹, Yoshimoto Hiroki) (born 2 September 1980 in Osaka) is a Japanese race car driver. He raced in the 2005 GP2 Series for the BCN Competicion team, alongside the Venezuelan E. J. Viso. For 2006, he was initially teamed with the more experienced Timo Glock of Germany. In addition to his racing, he is also the vocalist for Japanese rock band doa under the name Daiki Yoshimoto (吉本 大樹, Yoshimoto Daiki; "Daiki" and "Hiroki" are written identically in Japanese). In 2023, Yoshimoto and doa's members have announced departure from the agency Giza Studio and from September and became freelancer under Floodlight company, the announcement was made on doa's official website.

== Racing career ==
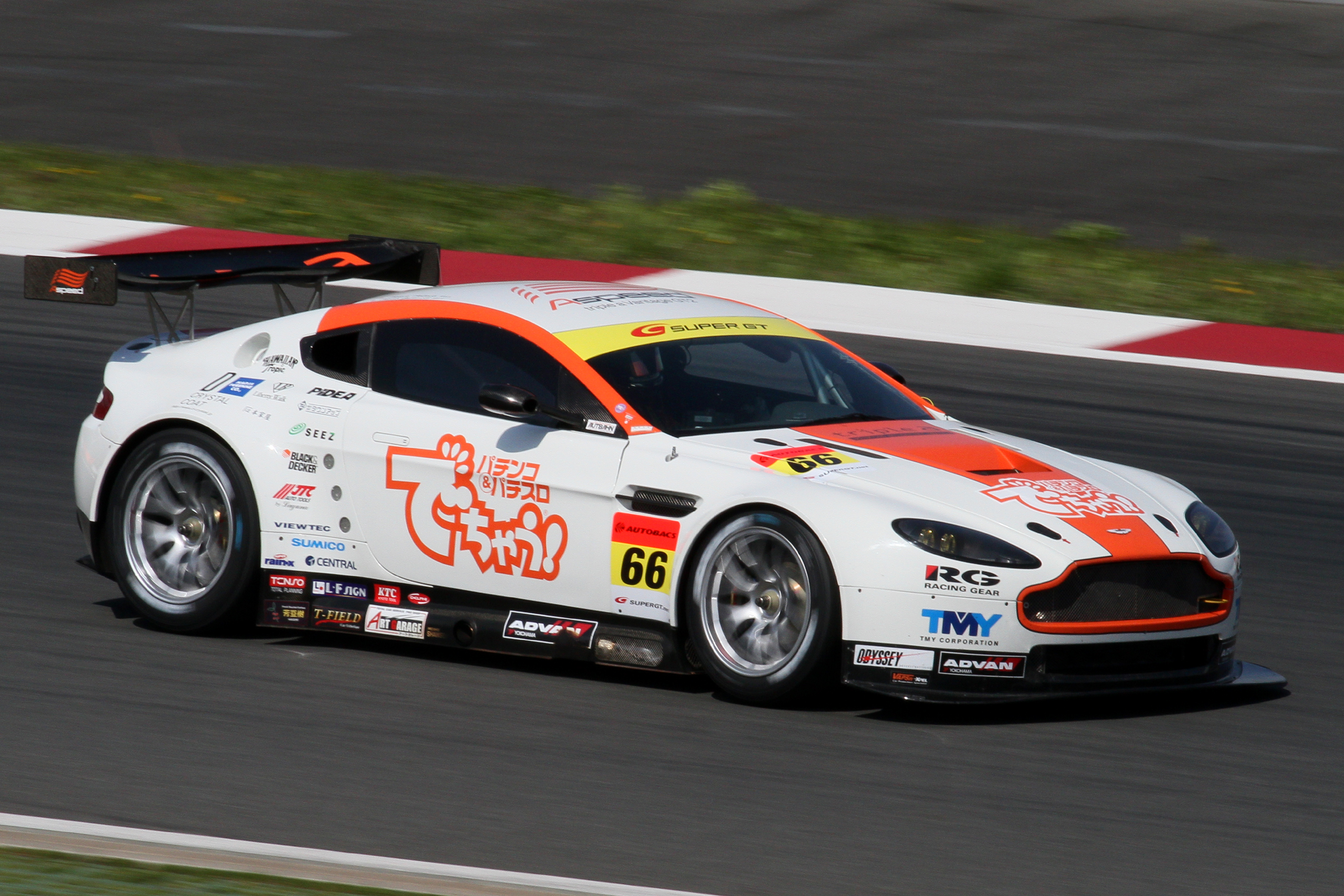
Hiroki Yoshimoto 2010 Super GT Fuji 400km qualify.jpg

Yoshimoto is the only driver in GP2 Series to have driven the bulk of his pre-GP2 career in Asia, the rest of the series mainly moving up the ranks in South America or Europe. Yoshimoto started out in 1999, competing in Japanese Formula Junior 1600. He moved for Japanese Formula Toyota in 2000, racing in Korean F1800 later in the year. A move to Japanese Formula Three for 2001 was his reward for hard work, although his stint with the Yellow Hat team resulted in only two races.

Yoshimoto got his first taste of a full Japanese F3 season in 2002, though, with the Now team. He achieved one win, one pole position and two other podium finishes, finishing eighth in the championship. He also finished respectively fifth in the prestigious Macau Grand Prix. He stayed with the team for 2003 finishing tenth in the championship before moving on in 2004 for the Japanese GT Series. He also drove two races of the World Series by Nissan of the same year, for the Gabord team.

On 3 and 4 November 2007, Yoshimoto took part in the Formula Asia V6 by Renault Championship at the Zhuhai International Circuit. He won round 11 ahead of James Winslow and Armaan Ebrahim but stalled on the grid for round 12 and eventually finished fifth.

Yoshimoto returned to GP2 for 2008, driving for the Qi-Meritus Mahara team in the GP2 Asia Series. He continued in the series for the 2008–09 season with the BCN Competición team. However, BCN was purchased and renamed as Ocean Racing Technology after the first round of the season, and Yoshimoto was replaced by Yelmer Buurman.

== Racing record ==
=== Complete Japanese Formula Three Championship results ===
(key) (Races in bold indicate pole position) (Races in italics indicate fastest lap)

Year	Entrant	Chassis	Engine	1	2	3	4	5	6	7	8	9	10	11	12	13	14	15	16	17	18	19	20	DC	Points
2001	Aim Sports	Dallara F300	Torii-Toyota 3S-GE	SUZ; 1	SUZ; 2	TSU; 1	TSU; 2	FUJ; 1	FUJ; 2	MIN; 1	MIN; 2	MOT; 1	MOT; 2	SUZ	SUG; 1	SUG; 2	SEN; 1	SEN; 2	OKA; 1 Ret	OKA; 2 Ret	MOT; 1	MOT; 2		NC	0
2002	Now Motor Sports	Dallara F302	Toyota-TOM'S 3S-GE	TSU; 1; 8	TSU; 2; 6	SUZ; 1; 7	SUZ; 2; 5	FUJ; 1 Ret	FUJ; 2; 6	MIN; 1 Ret	MIN; 2; 7	MOT; 1; 8	MOT; 2; 10	SUZ; 1; 8	SUZ; 2; 6	SUG; 1; 9	SUG; 2 Ret	SEN; 1; 3	SEN; 2; 6	**OKA**; **1**; 1	OKA; 2 Ret	MOT; 1; 11	MOT; 2; 11	8th	85
2003	Now Motor Sports	Lola-Dome F106	Toyota-TOM'S 3S-GE	SUZ; 1 Ret	SUZ; 2 DNS	FUJ; 1; 11	FUJ; 2 Ret	OKA; 1; 6	OKA; 2; 9	MOT; 1; 7	MOT; 2; 8	SUZ; 1; 8	SUZ; 2; 12	SUG; 1; 8	SUG; 2; 6	TSU; 1; 12	TSU; 2; 9	SUG; 1 Ret	SUG; 2; 8	MIN; 1; 5	MIN; 2; 7	MOT; 1; 7	MOT; 2; 7	10th	52

=== Complete World Series by Nissan results ===
(key) (Races in bold indicate pole position) (Races in italics indicate fastest lap)

Year	Entrant	1	2	3	4	5	6	7	8	9	10	11	12	13	14	15	16	17	18	DC	Points
2004	Gabord Reyco	JAR; 1	JAR; 2	ZOL; 1	ZOL; 2	MAG; 1	MAG; 2	VAL; 1	VAL; 2	LAU; 1	LAU; 2	EST; 1	EST; 2	CAT; 1	CAT; 2	VAL; 1 Ret	VAL; 2; 12	JER; 1 Ret	JER; 2; 10	24th	1

=== Complete GP2 Series results ===
(key) (Races in bold indicate pole position) (Races in italics indicate fastest lap)

Year	Entrant	1	2	3	4	5	6	7	8	9	10	11	12	13	14	15	16	17	18	19	20	21	22	23	DC	Points
2005	BCN Competición	IMO; FEA; Ret	IMO; SPR; 9	CAT; FEA; Ret	CAT; SPR; 17	MON; FEA; DNS	NÜR; FEA; 11	NÜR; SPR; Ret	MAG; FEA; 6	MAG; SPR; 2	SIL; FEA; 13	SIL; SPR; Ret	HOC; FEA; 12	HOC; SPR; Ret	HUN; FEA; 13	HUN; SPR; 17	IST; FEA; 8	IST; SPR; 10	MNZ; FEA; 10	MNZ; SPR; 16	SPA; FEA; Ret	SPA; SPR; 17	BHR; FEA; 7	BHR; SPR; 6	16th	14
2006	BCN Competición	VAL; FEA; Ret	VAL; SPR; 12	IMO; FEA; 8	IMO; SPR; 3	NÜR; FEA; 8	NÜR; SPR; 4	CAT; FEA; Ret	CAT; SPR; Ret	MON; FEA; Ret	SIL; FEA; Ret	SIL; SPR; 17†	MAG; FEA; 9	MAG; SPR; Ret	HOC; FEA; 23†	HOC; SPR; Ret	HUN; FEA; Ret	HUN; SPR; Ret	IST; FEA; Ret	IST; SPR; 19	MNZ; FEA; 8	MNZ; SPR; 5			15th	12

==== Complete GP2 Asia Series results ====
(key) (Races in bold indicate pole position) (Races in italics indicate fastest lap)

Year	Entrant	1	2	3	4	5	6	7	8	9	10	11	12	DC	Points
2008	Qi-Meritus Mahara	DUB; FEA; 6	DUB; SPR; 4	SEN; FEA; Ret	SEN; SPR; 20	SEP; FEA; Ret	SEP; SPR; 10	BHR; FEA; 12	BHR; SPR; 4	DUB; FEA; 5	DUB; SPR; 13			10th	13
2008–09	BCN Competición	SHI; FEA; Ret	SHI; SPR; 8	DUB; FEA	DUB; SPR	BHR; FEA	BHR; SPR	LSL; FEA	LSL; SPR	SEP; FEA	SEP; SPR	BHR; FEA	BHR; SPR	24th	0

=== Complete Super GT results ===
Year	Team	Car	Class	1	2	3	4	5	6	7	8	9	DC	Pts
2004	Team LeyJun	Vemac RD320R	GT300	TAI; 6	SUG; 6	SEP; 14	TOK; 22	MOT; 19	AUT	SUZ			12th	16
2005	Direxiv	Vemac RD320R	GT300	OKA	FUJ	SEP	SUG	MOT	FUJ	AUT; 10	SUZ; 14		22nd	1
2006	Cars Tokai Dream28	Mooncraft Shiden	GT300	SUZ	OKA	FUJ	SEP	SUG	SUZ; 5	MOT	AUT	FUJ	23rd	11
2007	Cars Tokai Dream28	Mooncraft Shiden	GT300	SUZ	OKA	FUJ	SEP	SUG	SUZ; 1	MOT	AUT	FUJ	14th	24
2008	Cars Tokai Dream28	Mooncraft Shiden	GT300	SUZ	OKA	FUJ	SEP	SUG	SUZ; Ret	MOT	AUT	FUJ	7th	111
2009	Cars Tokai Dream28	Mooncraft Shiden	GT300	OKA	SUZ; 7	FUJ; 9	SEP; 1	SUG; 2	SUZ; 3	FUJ; 5	AUT; 16	MOT; 16	8th	58
2010	A speed	Aston Martin V8 Vantage GT2	GT300	SUZ; DSQ	OKA; 15	FUJ; 3	SEP; 12	SUG; 11	SUZ; Ret	FUJ; C	MOT; 23		14th	11
2011	A speed	Aston Martin V8 Vantage GT2	GT300	OKA; 1	FUJ; Ret	SEP; Ret	SUG; 8	SUZ; 12	FUJ; 9	AUT; 11	MOT; 4		8th	33
2012	A speed	Aston Martin V12 Vantage GT3	GT300	OKA; 11	FUJ; 3	SEP; 3	SUG; Ret	SUZ; 1	FUJ; Ret	AUT; 1	MOT; 5		**2nd**	**73**
2013	JLOC	Lamborghini Gallardo GT3	GT300	OKA; 3	FUJ; 7	SEP; Ret	SUG; 5	SUZ; Ret	FUJ; 20	FUJ	AUT; 10	MOT; 8	11th	25
2014	LM corsa	BMW Z4 GT3	GT300	OKA; 22	FUJ; 21	AUT; 7	SUG; 10	FUJ; 5	SUZ; 1	BUR; 4	MOT; 15		6th	44
2015	LM corsa	Lexus RC F GT3	GT300	OKA; 10	FUJ; Ret	CHA; Ret	FUJ; 15	SUZ; 19	SUG; 22	AUT; 10	MOT; 17		27th	2
2016	LM corsa	Lexus RC F GT3	GT300	OKA; 25	FUJ; 21	SUG; Ret	FUJ; 17	SUZ; 18	CHA; 21	MOT; 20	MOT; Ret		NC	0
2017	LM corsa	Lexus RC F GT3	GT300	OKA; 22	FUJ; 8	AUT; 12	FUJ; 5	SUZ; 27	SUG; 4	CHA; 6	MOT; 18		12th	24
2018	LM corsa	Lexus RC F GT3	GT300	OKA; 17	FUJ; 7	SUZ; 5	CHA; 3	FUJ; Ret	SUG; 9	AUT; 12	MOT; 24		15th	23
2019	LM corsa	Lexus RC F GT3	GT300	OKA; 7‡	FUJ; 9	SUZ; 10	CHA; 15	FUJ; 22	AUT; 1	SUG; 19	MOT; 9		10th	27
2020	LM corsa	Lexus RC F GT3	GT300	FUJ; 13	FUJ; 16	SUZ; 17	MOT; 12	FUJ; 22	SUZ; 14	MOT; 12	FUJ; 9		27th	2
2021	LM corsa	Toyota GR Supra GT300	GT300	OKA; 8	FUJ; 1	SUZ; 12	MOT; 14	SUG; 5	AUT; 19	MOT; 11	FUJ; 1		3rd	49
2022	LM corsa	Toyota GR Supra GT300	GT300	OKA; 12	FUJ; 17	SUZ; 9	FUJ; 4	SUZ; 10	SUG; 15	AUT; 22	MOT; 11		23rd	11
2023	LM corsa	Toyota GR Supra GT300	GT300	OKA; 8	FUJ; 23†	SUZ; 7	FUJ; 10	SUZ; 12	SUG; 21	AUT; 20	MOT; 15		22nd	8
2024	LM corsa	Toyota GR Supra GT300	GT300	OKA; 12	FUJ; 20	SUZ; 10	FUJ; 14	SUG; 9	AUT; 10	MOT; 12	SUZ; 14		18th	4
2025	LM corsa	Lexus LC 500 GT	GT300	OKA; 14	FUJ; 15	SEP; 15	FS1 (18)	FS2; 16	SUZ; DSQ	SUG; 1	AUT; 20	MOT; 16	19th	29
2026	LM corsa	Lexus LC 500 GT	GT300	OKA; 10	FUJ; 16	FUJ; 11	SUZ; 13	**SUG**; 1	AUT; 24†	MOT; 15	MOT; 19		16th	41

^{‡} Half points awarded as less than 75% of race distance was completed.
^{(Number)} Driver did not take part in this sprint race, points are still awarded for the teammate's result.
^{*} Season still in progress.

=== Complete Formula Nippon results ===
Year	Team	Engine	1	2	3	4	5	6	7	8	9	10	11	DC	Pts
2007	SG team 5ZIGEN	Honda HF386E	FUJ; 13	SUZ; 19	MOT; 18	OKA; 17	SUZ; 15	FUJ; 17	SUG; Ret	MOT; Ret	SUZ; 15			21st	0
2008	SG team 5ZIGEN	Honda HF386E	FUJ	SUZ	MOT	OKA	SUZ; 18	SUZ; 15	MOT; 14	MOT; 10	FUJ	FUJ	SUG	20th	0

=== Complete Formula Renault V6 Asia Championship results ===
(key) (Races in bold indicate pole position) (Races in italics indicate fastest lap)

Year	Entrant	1	2	3	4	5	6	7	8	9	10	11	12	DC	Points
2007	Team Meritus	SEP1; 1	SEP1; 2	SEP2; 1	SEP2; 2	SEN; 1	SEN; 2	CHE; 1	CHE; 2	AUT; 1	AUT; 2	**ZHU**; **1**; 1	ZHU; 2; 5	14th	22

=== Complete World Touring Car Championship results ===
(key) (Races in bold indicate pole position) (Races in italics indicate fastest lap)

Year	Entrant	Car	1	2	3	4	5	6	7	8	9	10	11	12	13	14	15	16	17	18	19	20	21	22	23	24	DC	Points
2011	SUNRED Engineering	SUNRED SR León 1.6T	BRA; 1	BRA; 2	BEL; 1	BEL; 2	ITA; 1	ITA; 2	HUN; 1	HUN; 2	CZE; 1	CZE; 2	POR; 1	POR; 2	GBR; 1	GBR; 2	GER; 1	GER; 2	ESP; 1	ESP; 2	JPN; 1 Ret	JPN; 2; 17	CHN; 1	CHN; 2	MAC; 1	MAC; 2	34th	0
2012	Tuenti Racing Team	SUNRED SR León 1.6T	ITA; 1	ITA; 2	ESP; 1	ESP; 2	MAR; 1	MAR; 2	SVK; 1	SVK; 2	HUN; 1	HUN; 2	AUT; 1	AUT; 2	POR; 1	POR; 2	BRA; 1	BRA; 2	USA; 1	USA; 2	JPN; 1; 16	JPN; 2; 19	CHN; 1	CHN; 2	MAC; 1	MAC; 2	36th	0
2013	NIKA Racing	Chevrolet Cruze 1.6T	ITA; 1	ITA; 2	MAR; 1	MAR; 2	SVK; 1	SVK; 2	HUN; 1	HUN; 2	AUT; 1	AUT; 2	RUS; 1	RUS; 2	POR; 1	POR; 2	ARG; 1	ARG; 2	USA; 1	USA; 2	JPN; 1; 18	JPN; 2 Ret	CHN; 1	CHN; 2	MAC; 1	MAC; 2	40th	0

=== Complete Asian Le Mans Series results ===
(key) (Races in bold indicate pole position) (Races in italics indicate fastest lap)

Year	Entrant	Car	Engine	Class	1	2	3	4	DC	Points
2015–16	Team AAI - HubAuto	BMW Z4 GT3	BMW 4.4 L V8	GT	FUJ; 3	SEP; 6			7th	43
2015–16	Team AAI - HubAuto	Mercedes-Benz SLS AMG GT3	Mercedes-Benz 6.2 L V8	GT			BUR; 4	SEP; 6	7th	43
