= ADESS-03 =

German sports car prototype

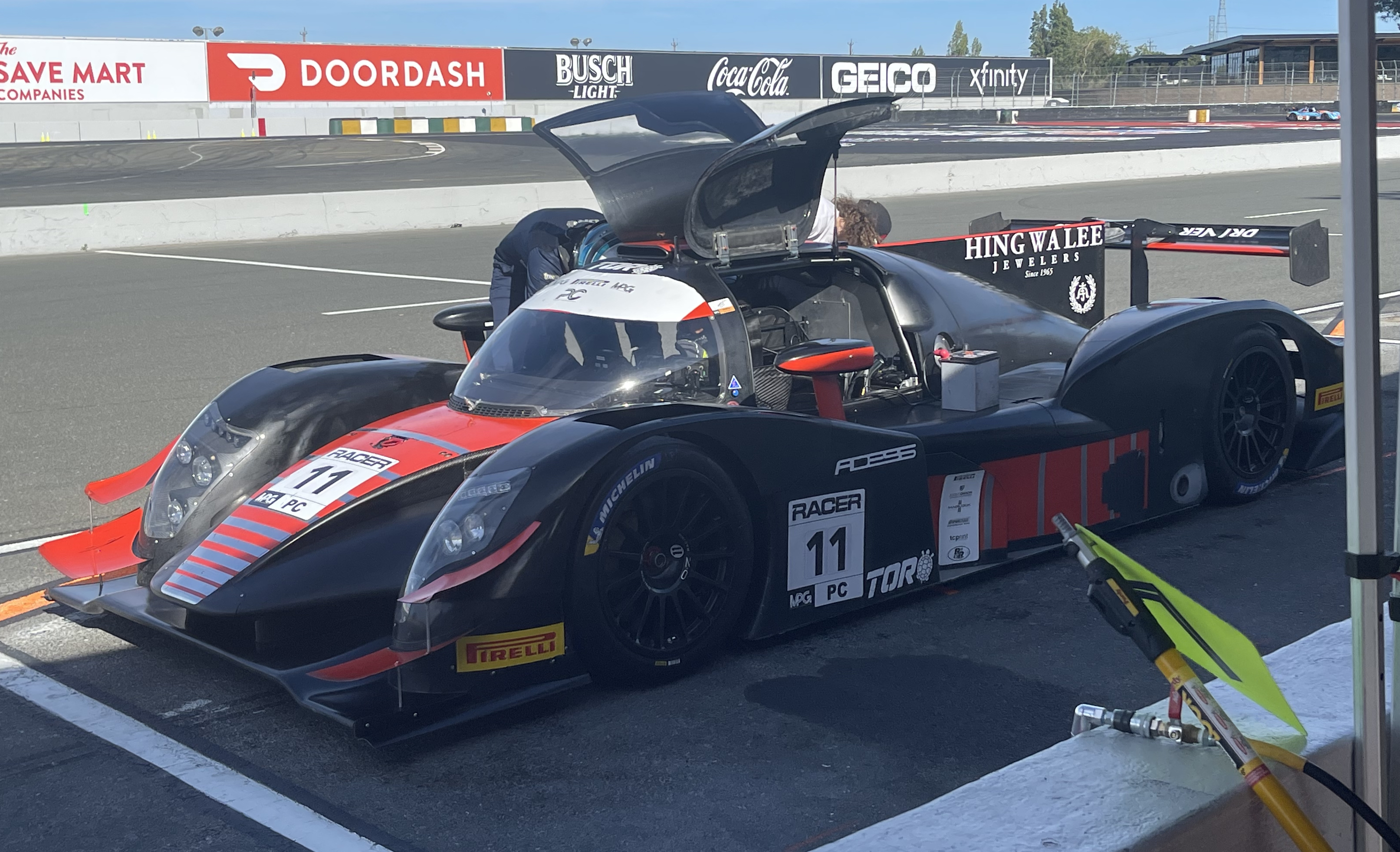
- The No. 11 ADESS-03 in 2023.
- Category: Le Mans Prototype (LMP3)
- Constructor: ADESS
- Designer: Stéphane Chosse
- Successor: ADESS AD25

Technical specifications
- Chassis: Carbon fibre composite monocoque
- Suspension (front): Independent double wishbones with adjustable dampers
- Suspension (rear): Independent double wishbones with adjustable dampers
- Length: 4643mm
- Width: 1890mm
- Height: 1050mm
- Wheelbase: 2968mm
- Engine: Nissan VK50DE 5.0L V8; Gibson GL458 4.5 L V8 naturally aspirated
- Transmission: X-Trac 6-speed sequential manual
- Weight: 930kg
- Fuel: Various
- Brakes: Brembo 6 Piston Ø 355 mm x 32 mm front and rear steel discs
- Tyres: Michelin

Competition history
- Notable entrants: (Canada) Atlantic Racing Team (United States) ANSA Motorsports (Taiwan) AAI Motorsports (Luxembourg) DKR Engineering (France) CMR / Sport Garage
- Debut: 2015 2 Hours of Fuji
- Last event: 2021 Road to Le Mans
Races	Wins	Poles	F/Laps
17	0	1	0
- Teams' Championships: 0
- Drivers' Championships: 0

The ADESS-03 is a Le Mans Prototype LMP3 built to ACO Le Mans Prototype LMP3 regulations. It was designed and built by ADESS. The car had its competition debut at the 2015 2 Hours of Fuji. The car also serves as a base for the GreenGT LMPH2G and H24 Hydrogen powered Le Mans Prototype.

== Development ==
In 2013, the ACO announced a new category of Le Mans Prototypes, known as LMP3, which would replace the previous Le Mans Prototype Challenge (LMPC) class in 2015. Initially, the car was meant to be made by LAS Motorsport, a joint venture between Sebastien Loeb Racing, ADESS, as well as SORA Racing. Under the initial agreement, Sebastien Loeb Racing would be in charge of development and assembly, while ADESS would be in charge of the design and homologation of the car, and SORA Racing handling production. However, when the car was launched on 9 June 2015, it was known instead as the ADESS-03, with no branding on the car from Sebastien Loeb Racing, SORA Racing, or LAS Motorsport. The car had its first shakedown test performed at the Hockenheimring, on 16 September 2015 with customer AAI Motorsports. The car has been known to have reliability issues stemming from its driveshaft angles, as well as issues with its gull-wing style doors.

=== GreenGT LMPH2G ===
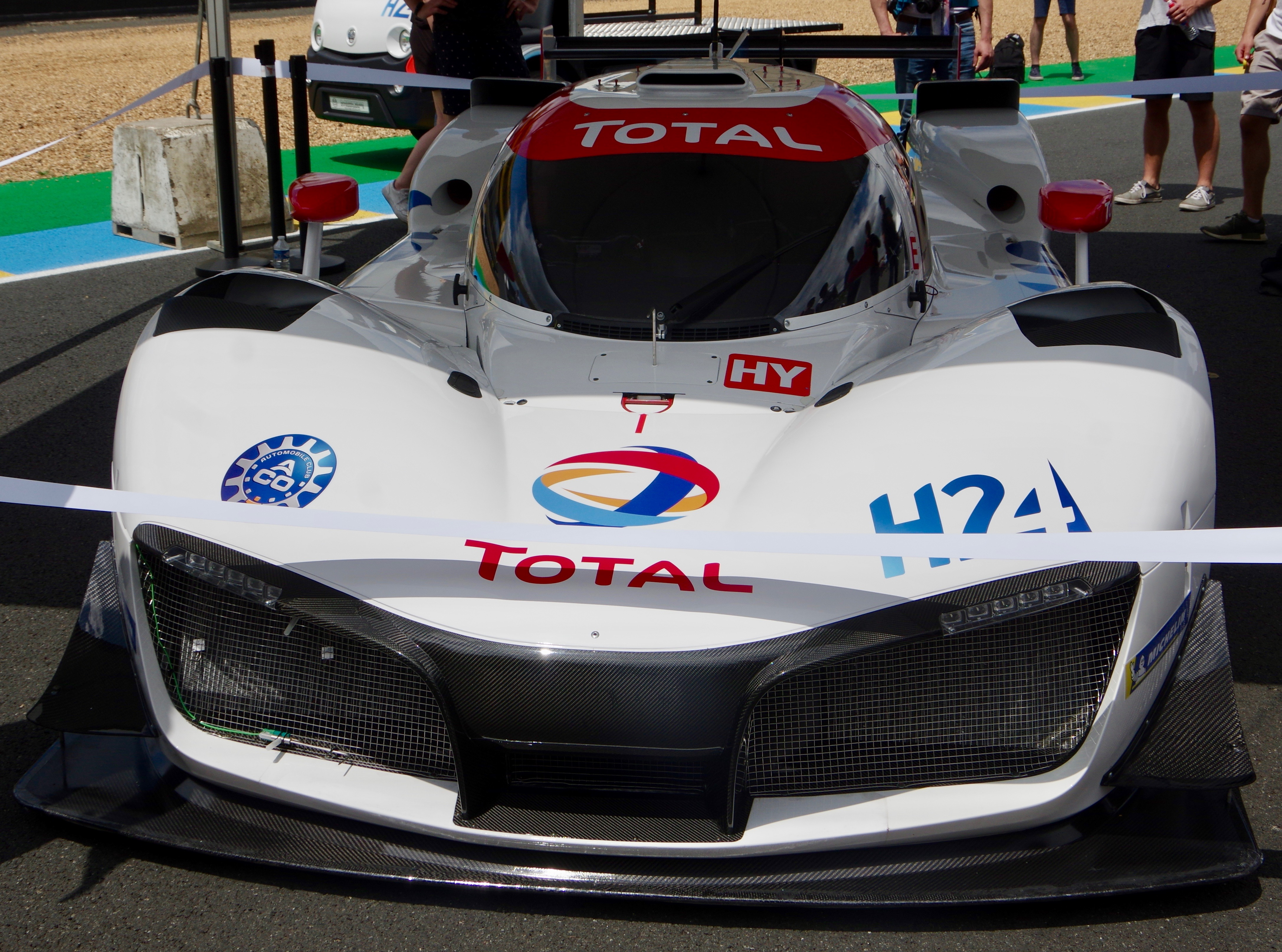
The GreenGT LMPH2G at the 2019 24 Hours of Le Mans

The ADESS-03 served as a base for the GreenGT LMPH2G, which was developed by GreenGT which in 2013 attempted to field a Garage 56 effort at Le Mans with a hydrogen-powered prototype, then known as the GreenGT H2, but did not ultimately participate in the race. The car is powered by a 650bhp hydrogen fuel-cell power plant, with power output capable of being increased by up to 335bhp through an energy-retrieval system.

During the weekend of the 2018 4 Hours of Spa Francorchamps, the car was demonstrated by former Le Mans winner Yannick Dalmas, while GreenGT also did demonstrations of refuelling in the pitlane. The car's hydrogen is contained in sealed tanks at 700-bar pressure. It was later announced that the car would participate in the pre-race proceedings at the 2019 24 Hours of Le Mans, with the car set to run a demonstration lap of the full Circuit de la Sarthe.

=== ADESS-03 Evo ===
In late 2019, the ADESS-03 Evo, an updated version of the original 03, was released for use in the second generation of LMP3 competition.

=== GreenGT H24 ===
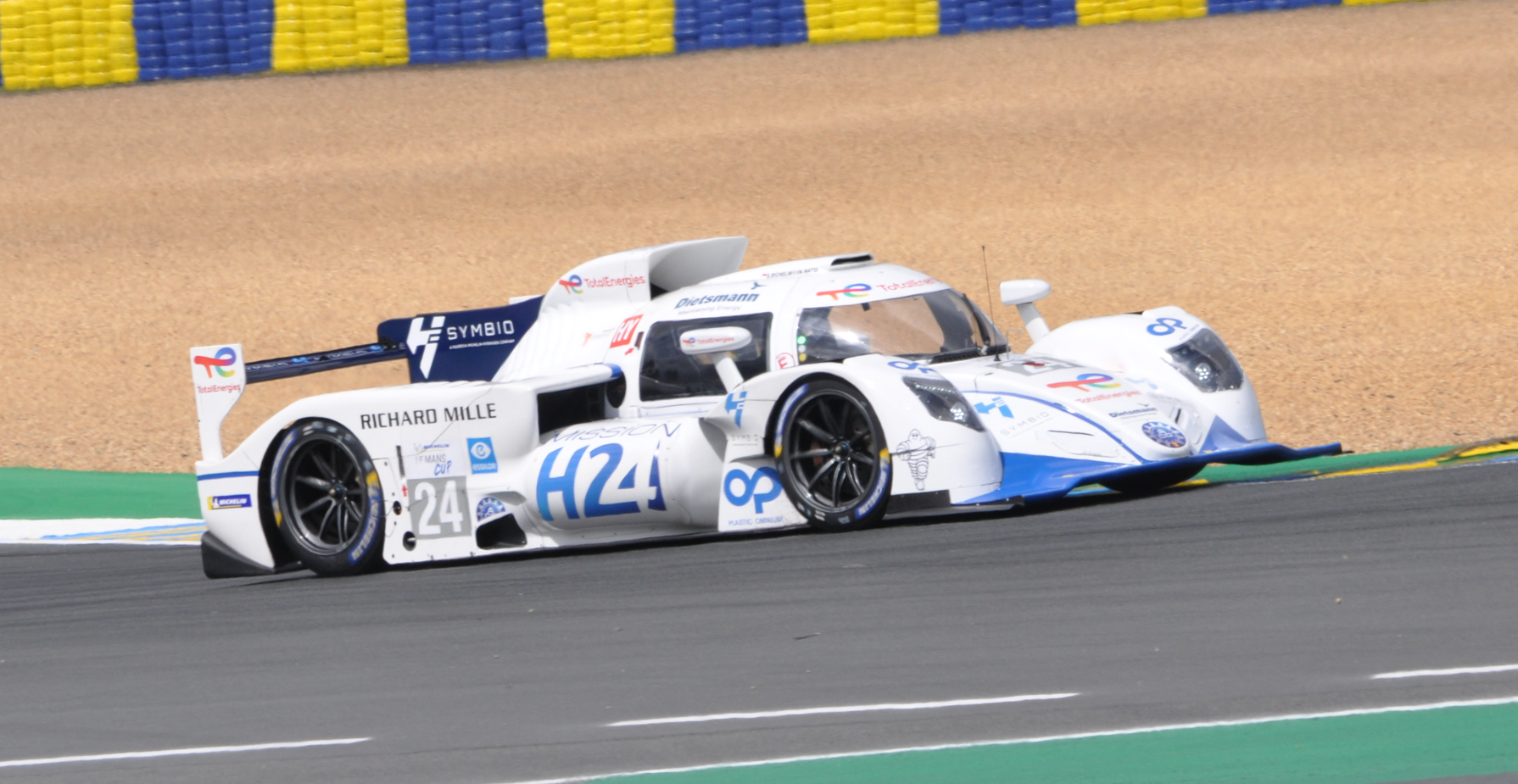
The GreenGT H24 competing in the 2022 Road to Le Mans.

The ADESS-03 Evo also serves as the base for the GreenGT H24 car.

== Competition history ==
=== 2015-2016 Asian Le Mans Series ===
The car had its debut in the 2015 2 Hours of Fuji, the inaugural round of the 2015-2016 Asian Le Mans Series, where the 2 cars campaigned by Team AAI retired. For the 2nd round of the series at Sepang, the #89 car finished 2nd in the LMP3 class, before the #88 ended the season for team AAI with a pole at the 4th Round at Sepang, but failed to finish the race.

=== 2016-2017 Asian Le Mans Series ===
For the 2016-2017 Asian Le Mans Series, Team AAI scaled down its involvement in the LMP3 class, with the team only participating in the last round of the series at Sepang, with a single car entry. The #93 car retired from the race.

=== 2018 IMSA Michelin Encore ===
Atlantic Racing Team ran one car in the end of season IMSA Michelin Encore. The single car finished 15th of the 20 cars on the grid.

=== 2021 Le Mans Cup ===
The car returned to competition with R-Breizh Competition in the opening round of the 2021 Le Mans Cup at Barcelona. The car finished 26th overall. It would race again that season with Revere Lifestyle at the 2021 Road to Le Mans however, they would retire from both races.
