= Denis Lian =

Singaporean race car driver (born 1972)

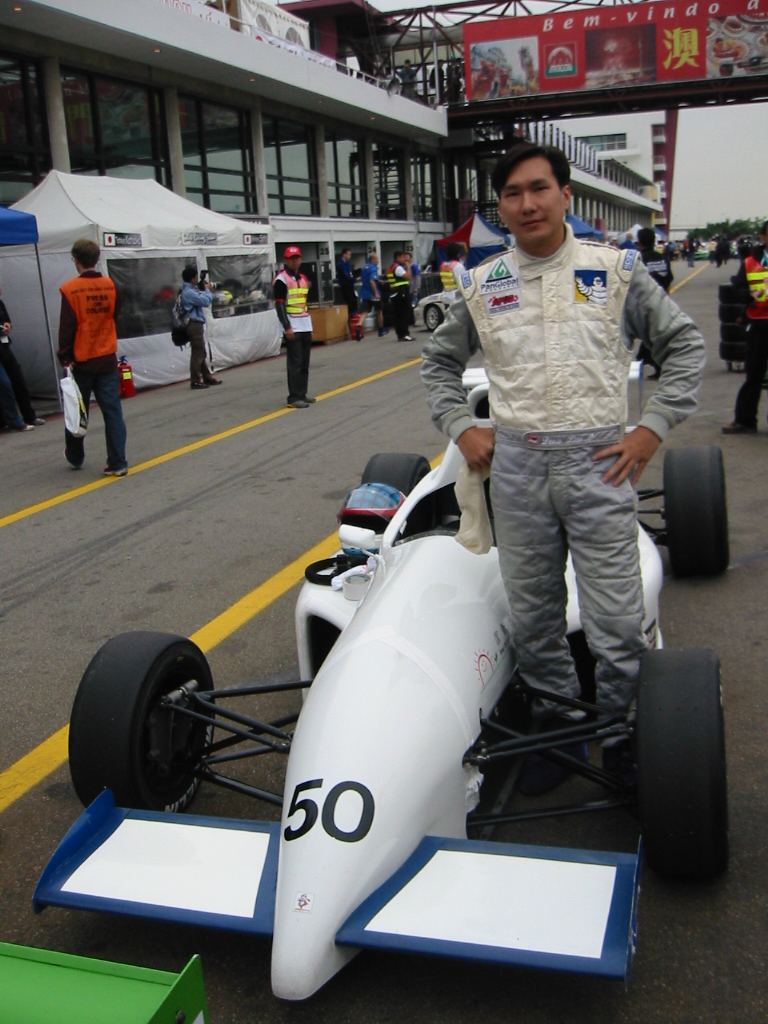
- Lian in 2002
- Nationality: Singaporean
- Born: Denis Lian Jian Sheng; 8 March 1972 (age 54) Singapore

A1 Grand Prix career
- Debut season: 2006–07
- Current team: A1 Team Singapore
- Starts: 2 (4 entries)
- Wins: 0
- Podiums: 0
- Poles: 0
- Best finish: 20th in 2006–07

Denis Lian Jian Sheng (Traditional Chinese: 練建勝; born 8 March 1972) is a racing driver from Singapore.

Denis Lian is Singapore's most successful professional racing driver. In 2002, he was crowned Asian Formula 2000 Champion, becoming the first Singaporean to win an international motorsports title. In 2005, he went onto become the first Singaporean to compete in Europe when he raced in the Formula Palmer Audi Euro Series. In 2006, he established his own Formula V6 Asia race team to compete in the regions then premier series, finishing 7th overall as the only driver and team owner. Later that year, he was selected to represent Singapore in A1GP, the World Cup of Motorsports. He raced for A1 Team Singapore in the 2006/2007 season with a best place finish of 18th overall. Outside of racing, Denis also had a successful career in the automotive industry, initially as Brand Manager for Lotus Cars Singapore from 2004 to 2005 then Brand Manager for McLaren Singapore from 2011 to 2013 and subsequently Regional Business Development Manager for BMW Alpina GmbH from 2017 to 2018. Over the course of his career, Denis competed in various international GT and endurance events, like Lamborghini Super Trofeo Asia, the Dubai 24hr, Gulf 12hr and Sepang 12hr enduro. In 2014, with the support of Wolf Racing Cars, he competed in the Asian Le Mans Series for the first time and finished runner up in the drivers championship (CN category). In 2015 and 2016, he went one better and won the Asian Le Mans Drivers Championship title (CN category) once again becoming the first Singaporean to do so. In 2018, Denis Lian finally hung up his helmet and retired from full time racing.

== Results ==
=== Summary ===
| Season | Series | Position | Car | Team |
|---|---|---|---|---|
| 1999 | Formula Asia | 5th | Argo–Ford AF2000 | N/A |
| 2000 | Formula Asia | 4th | Argo–Ford AF2000 | N/A |
| 2001 | Formula Asia | **3rd** | Argo–Ford AF2000 | N/A |
| 2002 | Formula Asia | **1st** | Argo–Ford AF2000 | N/A |
| 2005 | Formula Palmer Audi | 13th | Van Diemen–Audi FPA | MotorSport Vision |
| 2006 | Formula V6 Asia by Renault Series | 7th | Tatuus–Nissan | Racing for Singapore |
| 2006–07 | A1 Grand Prix | 20th | Lola–Zytek B05/52 | A1 Team Singapore |
| 2014 | Asian Le Mans Series – Class CN | **2nd** | Wolf–Honda GB08 | Team Avelon Formula |
| 2015–16 | Asian Le Mans Series – Class CN | **1st** | Wolf–Honda GB08 | Team Avelon Formula |

=== Complete A1 Grand Prix results ===
(key) (Races in bold indicate pole position) (Races in italics indicate fastest lap)

| Year | Entrant | 1 | 2 | 3 | 4 | 5 | 6 | 7 | 8 | 9 | 10 | 11 | 12 | 13 | 14 | 15 | 16 | 17 | 18 | 19 | 20 | 21 | 22 | DC | Points |
|---|---|---|---|---|---|---|---|---|---|---|---|---|---|---|---|---|---|---|---|---|---|---|---|---|---|
| 2006–07 | Singapore | NED; SPR; PO | NED; FEA; PO | CZE; SPR; 18 | CZE; FEA; 19 | CHN; SPR | CHN; FEA | MYS; SPR | MYS; FEA | IDN; SPR | IDN; FEA | NZL; SPR | NZL; FEA | AUS; SPR | AUS; FEA | RSA; SPR | RSA; FEA | MEX; SPR | MEX; FEA | CHN; SPR | CHN; FEA | GBR; SPR | GBR; SPR | 20th | 3 |
