= David Cheng =

American sports car racing driver

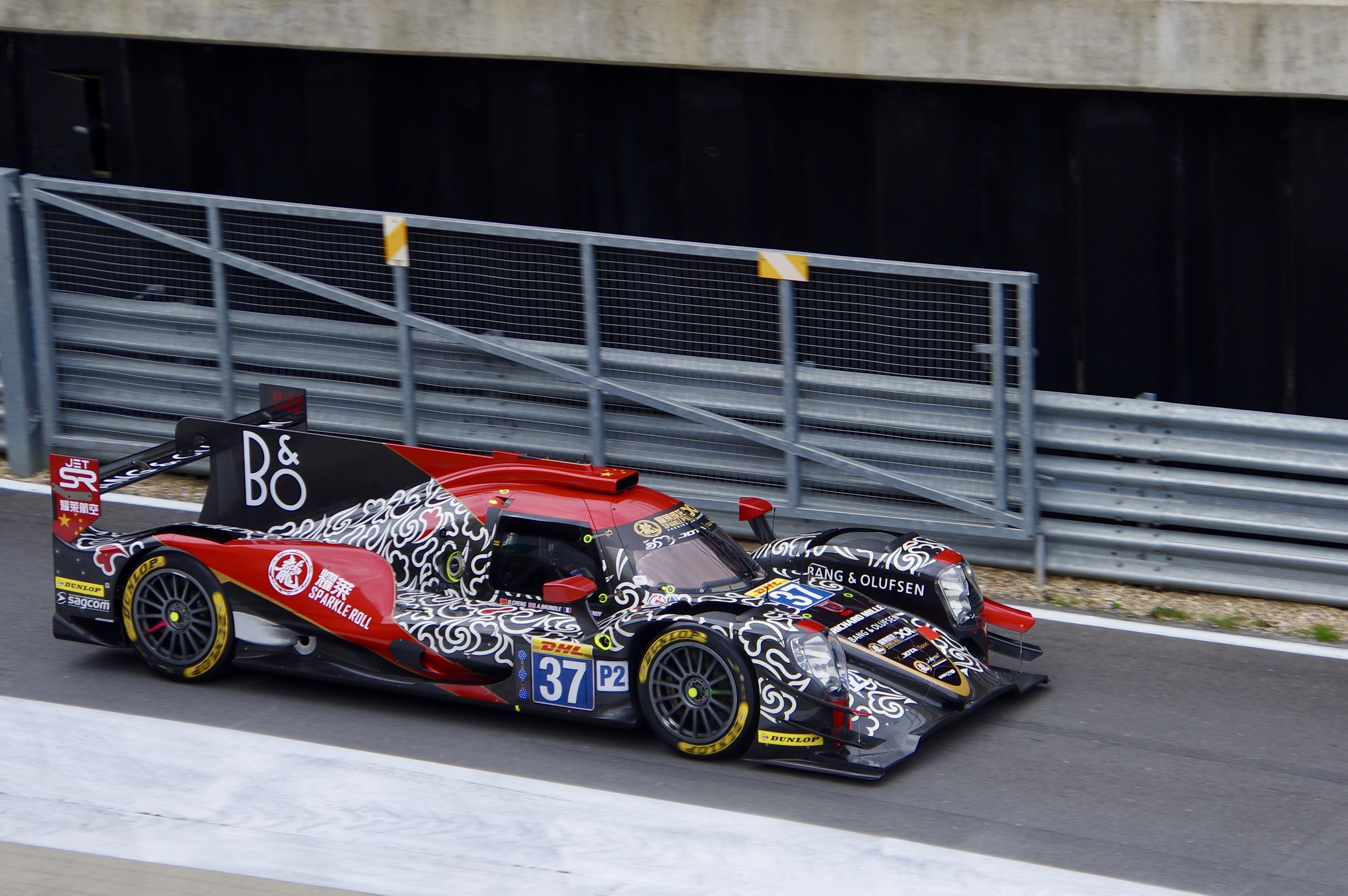
- Nationality: (China) Chinese (United States) American (Note: Cheng competed under an American racing license prior to 2013. He currently represents China.)
- Born: David Fei Cheng; July 21, 1989 (age 37) Haidian District, Beijing, China

FIA World Endurance Championship career
- Debut season: 2016
- Current team: Jackie Chan DC Racing
- Categorisation: FIA Silver
- Car number: 37
- Starts: 26
- Championships: 0
- Wins: 0
- Podiums: 1
- Poles: 0
- Fastest laps: 0
- Best finish: 9th in 2016
- Finished last season: 9th

Championship titles
- 2015–16 2013, 2014: Asian Le Mans Series - LMP3; Asian Le Mans Series - LMP2

24 Hours of Le Mans career
- Years: 2014–present
- Teams: OAK Racing, Pegasus Racing, Jackie Chan DC Racing
- Best finish: 3rd (2017)
- Class wins: 0

David Fei Cheng (Chinese: 程飞; pinyin: Chéng Fēi, born 21 July 1989) is a Chinese-American sports car racing driver who last competed in the Jaguar I-Pace eTrophy. He previously competed in the FIA World Endurance Championship for Jackie Chan DC Racing, and finished on the overall and class podium at the 2017 24 Hours of Le Mans, becoming the first Chinese driver to do so. He is a three-time champion of the Asian Le Mans Series, having won the championship twice in the LMP2 class in 2013 and 2014, and in the LMP3 class in 2016.

== Racing career ==
Born in Beijing, Cheng moved to Seattle in the United States at the age of six and was introduced to kart racing by a friend of his father; he had to do so in secret as his mother believed auto racing was too dangerous. In 2011, he moved up to sports cars, racing in the American Le Mans Series (ALMS) and the 24 Hours of Daytona. In the race, Cheng's team competed in the GT class, but the car suffered major damage before Cheng could drive; the team was able to overcome the damage to finish 21st. During the year, he also raced in China's Scirocco R Cup China, finishing seventh in points with a best finish of second at Sepang International Circuit's Merdeka Millennium Endurance Race. A year later, he split time between the Continental Tire SportsCar Challenge and Scirocco R Cup.

In 2013, Cheng joined OAK Racing in the Asian Le Mans Series, driving for an all-Chinese stable alongside Ho-Pin Tung. At Sepang, he won the Sepang 12 Hours and was named one of ten Outstanding Youth by the Ministry of Foreign Affairs of the People's Republic of China. He also ran the ALMS' 12 Hours of Sebring and Petit Le Mans races, winning the former and claiming the Drivers' Championship for his co-driver in the latter by one point. Cheng and OAK ended the year by winning the LMP2 Asian Le Mans Team and Driver Championships. Cheng repeated the feat a season later.

For the 2015–16 Asian Le Mans Series season, Cheng formed DC Racing, racing a Ligier JS P3 with former OAK teammate Tung and Thomas Laurent. The team ended the season with the Team Championship and a guaranteed spot in the 2016 24 Hours of Le Mans.

In March 2015, Cheng met actor and martial artist Jackie Chan, who discussed his enjoyment of Steve McQueen's movie Le Mans as well as his interest in racing. After Cheng finished ninth in the LMP2 class at Le Mans that year, Chan raised the possibility of owning a team together for 2016, to which Cheng agreed. Together, the two entered DC Racing into the FIA World Endurance Championship under the Baxi DC Racing Alpine banner, partnering with Signatech Alpine and fielding Alpine A460s in the LMP2 class. In October, the team was rebranded as Jackie Chan DC Racing.

In 2017, Jackie Chan DC Racing allied with Jota Sport. At Le Mans, the team's No. 38 LMP2 took advantage of problems striking the LMP1 field to lead overall laps, becoming the first lower-class team to do so at Le Mans. The car went on to finish second overall and win the LMP2 class, while DC's No. 37 car, driven by Cheng, finished fourth overall, but Rebellion Racing's No. 13 was disqualified after failing post-race inspection and Cheng's No. 37 was promoted onto the podium. The No. 38's effort marked the first time a Chinese team won its class at Le Mans.

== Racing record ==
=== Racing career summary ===
Season	Series	Team	Races	Wins	Poles	FLaps	Podiums	Points	Position
2009	Pacific F2000 Championship	PR1 Motorsports	5	0	0	0	0	72	11th
2010	Pacific F2000 Championship	PR1 Motorsports	12	2	3	4	7	242	**2nd**
2010	U.S. F2000 National Championship	ZSports Midwest	2	0	0	0	0	N/A	NC†
2011	Pacific F2000 Championship	PR1 Motorsports	12	4	2	1	9	279	**2nd**
2011	Volkswagen Scirocco R Cup China	Tianjin Konggang Zhonghui Automobile						64	7th
2011	American Le Mans Series - LMPC	PR1/Mathiasen Motorsports	1	0	0	0	1	13	18th
2011	Rolex Sports Car Series - GT	PR1 Motorsports	1	0	0	0	0	16	57th
2012	Volkswagen Scirocco R Cup China	Tianjin Konggang Zhonghui Automobile	11	4			4	95	5th
2012	Continental Sports Car Challenge - ST	APR Motorsport	9	1	0	0	1	80	42nd
2012	Formula Pilota China	Team UKYO with Super License	3	0	0	0	0	4	19th
2012	Pacific F2000 Championship	PR1 Motorsports	4	1	0	1	3	97	7th
2013	Asian Le Mans Series - LMP2	OAK Racing	4	2			4	89	**1st**
2013	FIA World Endurance Championship - LMP2	OAK Racing	2	0	0	0	0	18	20th
2013	American Le Mans Series - PC	PR1/Mathiasen Motorsports	5	1	0	0	2	6	23rd
2013	Pacific F1600 Championship Series	PR1 Motorsports	2	1	1	0	2	54	8th
2014	Asian Le Mans Series - LMP2	OAK Racing Team Total	4	4	4	3	4	103	**1st**
2014	FIA World Endurance Championship - LMP2	OAK Racing-Team Asia	2	0	0	0	1	N/A†	NC†
2014	24 Hours of Le Mans - LMP2	OAK Racing-Team Asia	1	0	0	0	0	N/A	7th
2014	United SportsCar Championship - PC	PR1/Mathiasen Motorsports	1	0	0	0	0	66	21st
2014	United SportsCar Championship - PC	Starworks Motorsport	1	0	0	0	1	66	21st
2014	United SportsCar Championship - PC	BAR1 Motorsports	2	0	0	0	0	66	21st
2014	Audi R8 LMS Cup China	CTVS Racing Team	2	0	0	0	0	1	20th
2015	European Le Mans Series - LMP2	Pegasus Racing Team Total by DC Racing	5	0	0	0	0	14	16th
2015	FIA World Endurance Championship - LMP2	Pegasus Racing Team Total by DC Racing	2	0	0	0	0	N/A†	NC†
2015	24 Hours of Le Mans - LMP2	Pegasus Racing Team Total by DC Racing	1	0	0	0	0	N/A	9th
2015	Audi R8 LMS Cup China	Michelin Racing Team	4	0	0	0	0	1	23rd
2015	United SportsCar Championship - Prototype	RG Racing	1	0	0	0	0	25	28th
2015	United SportsCar Championship - PC	BAR1 Motorsports	1	0	0	0	0	1	41st
2015–16	Asian Le Mans Series - LMP3	DC Racing	4	4	4	4	4	103	**1st**
2016	FIA World Endurance Championship - LMP2	Baxi DC Racing Alpine	9	0	0	0	0	40	13th
2016	24 Hours of Le Mans - LMP2	Baxi DC Racing Alpine	1	0	0	0	0	N/A	NC
2016–17	Asian Le Mans Series - LMP3	Jackie Chan DC Racing	4	1	0	1	3	63	**3rd**
2017	FIA World Endurance Championship - LMP2	Jackie Chan DC Racing	9	0	0	0	1	77	11th
2017	24 Hours of Le Mans - LMP2	Jackie Chan DC Racing	1	0	0	0	1	N/A	**2nd**
2017	Audi R8 LMS Cup	TianShi Racing Team	8	1	0	1	2	67	7th
2017	IMSA SportsCar Championship - PC	BAR1 Motorsports	1	0	0	0	1	32	15th
2017–18	Asian Le Mans Series - LMP2	Jackie Chan DC Racing × Jota	2	0	0	0	1	15	9th
2018	24 Hours of Le Mans - LMP2	Jackie Chan DC Racing	1	0	0	0	0	N/A	8th
2018–19	Jaguar I-Pace eTrophy	Jaguar VIP Car	1	0	0	0	0	N/A†	NC†
2019–20	Jaguar I-Pace eTrophy - Pro-Am	Jaguar China Racing	1	0	0	0	0	0	NC
2026	Legends of Le Mans Series - LMP2	Greaves Motorsport							

=== Complete 24 Hours of Le Mans results ===
Year	Team	Co-Drivers	Car	Class	Laps	Pos.	Class Pos.
2014	(France) OAK Racing	(China) Ho-Pin Tung (China) Adderly Fong	Ligier JS P2-Honda	LMP2	347	12th	7th
2015	(Germany) Pegasus Racing	(China) Ho-Pin Tung (France) Léo Roussel	Morgan LMP2-Nissan	LMP2	334	19th	9th
2016	(China) Baxi DC Racing Alpine	(China) Ho-Pin Tung (France) Nelson Panciatici	Alpine A460-Nissan	LMP2	234	DNF	DNF
2017	(China) Jackie Chan DC Racing	(France) Tristan Gommendy (United Kingdom) Alex Brundle	Oreca 07-Gibson	LMP2	363	**3rd**	**2nd**
2018	(China) Jackie Chan DC Racing	(United States) Nick Boulle (France) Pierre Nicolet	Ligier JS P217-Gibson	LMP2	355	12th	8th

=== Complete FIA World Endurance Championship results ===
(key) (Races in bold indicate pole position; races in italics indicate fastest lap)

Year	Entrant	Class	Chassis	Engine	1	2	3	4	5	6	7	8	9	Rank	Points
2013	OAK Racing	LMP2	Morgan LMP2	Nissan VK45DE 4.5 L V8	SIL	SPA	LMS	SÃO	COA	FUJ	SHA; 6	BHR; 5		20th	18
2014	OAK Racing	LMP2	Ligier JS P2	Honda HR28TT 2.8 L Turbo V6	SIL	SPA	LMS; 7	COA	FUJ					NC^{†}	0
2014	OAK Racing	LMP2	Morgan LMP2	Judd HK 3.6 L V8						SHA; 6	BHR; 3	SÃO		NC^{†}	0
2015	Pegasus Racing	LMP2	Morgan LMP2	Nissan VK45DE 4.5 L V8	SIL	SPA	LMS; 9	NÜR	COA	FUJ	SHA; 5	BHR		NC^{†}	0
2016	Baxi DC Racing Alpine	LMP2	Alpine A460	Nissan VK45DE 4.5 L V8	SIL; 7	SPA; Ret	LMS; Ret	NÜR; 7	MEX; 5	COA; 8	FUJ; 9	SHA; 8	BHR; 6	9th	42
2017	Jackie Chan DC Racing	LMP2	Oreca 07	Gibson GK428 4.2 L V8	SIL; 8	SPA; 10	LMS; 2	NÜR; 5	MEX; 6	COA; 5	FUJ; Ret	SHA; 8	BHR; 8	11th	77
2018–19	Jackie Chan DC Racing	LMP2	Ligier JS P217	Gibson GK428 4.2 L V8	SPA	LMS; 8	SIL	FUJ	SHA	SEB	SPA	LMS		NC^{†}	0

^{†} As Cheng was a guest driver, he was ineligible to score points.
^{*} Season still in progress.

=== Complete WeatherTech SportsCar Championship results ===
(key)(Races in bold indicate pole position, Results are overall/class)

Year	Team	Class	Make	Engine	1	2	3	4	5	6	7	8	9	10	Rank	Points
2015	RG Racing	P	Riley Mk XXVI DP	Dinan (BMW) 5.0 L V8	DAY; 6	SIR	LBH	LGA	DET	WGL	MSP	ELK	COA	PET	27th	26

Sporting positions
Preceded by Christophe Tinseau; Shinji Nakano	Asian Le Mans Series; LMP2 Champion; 2013	Succeeded by David Cheng; Ho-Pin Tung
Preceded by David Cheng	Asian Le Mans Series; LMP2 Champion; 2014; With: Ho-Pin Tung	Succeeded by Nicolas Leutwiler
