= Chris van der Drift =

New Zealander-Dutch racing driver

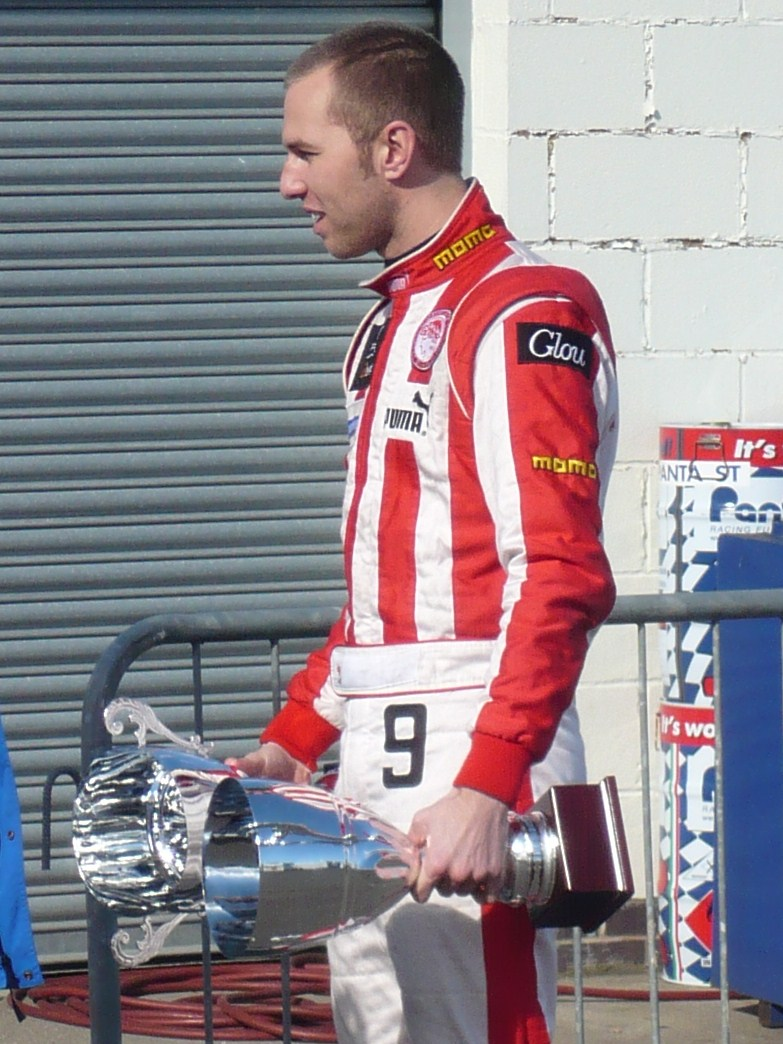
- Van der Drift as Olympiacos driver, holding his podium trophies at Silverstone's 2010 SF round.
- Nationality: (New Zealand) New Zealander
- Born: Christopher Jason van der Drift; 8 March 1986 (age 40) Hamilton, New Zealand

Porsche Carrera Cup Asia career
- Debut season: 2015
- Current team: TORO Racing
- Categorisation: FIA Gold
- Car number: 99
- Former teams: Team Formax, Kamlung Racing
- Starts: 43
- Wins: 15
- Poles: 12
- Fastest laps: 8
- Best finish: 1st in 2015, 2017 & 2018

Previous series
- 2013 2012 2009, 11 2010–11 2008–09 2007–08 2006 2006 2004–05: International GT Open; Auto GP World Series; Formula Renault 3.5 Series; Superleague Formula; GP2 Asia Series; International Formula Master; Formula Renault 2.0 Eurocup; Formula Renault 2.0 NEC; Formula BMW ADAC

Championship titles
- 2008 2015, 17–18 2021: International Formula Master; Porsche Carrera Cup Asia; TCR New Zealand

Christopher Jason van der Drift (born 8 March 1986) is a New Zealand racing driver of Dutch descent who currently competes in the Asian Le Mans Series for Absolute Motorsport.

== Career ==
Van der Drift started karting at the age of seven and in 1994 he raced his first year in cadets. From there he went on to win six New Zealand Championships and six North Island Championships until 2002.

After ten years of kart racing in New Zealand and also competing in Australia for two years in 2001 JICA and 2002 Ford Kart Stars (finishing both championships in sixth), van der Drift had to take the step into racing cars. At the time, he had no sponsors so it was difficult just to step into a car as his parents didn't have enough to fund that as well.

== Racing record ==
=== Karting career summary ===
Season	Series	Position
1996	NZ Top Half Series - Cadet class	**1st**
1999	NZ Top Half Series - JR 100cc Yamaha class	**1st**
2001	Kartsport NZ National Sprint Championship - 100cc Junior Yamaha class	**1st**
2001	Kartsport NZ Sprint Championship - Junior Intercontinental A	**1st**
2001	CIK Trophy of New Zealand - Junior ICA class	**1st**
2007	CIK Trophy of New Zealand - Formula 100 class	**2nd**
2019	CIK Trophy of New Zealand - Vortex Rok DVS Senior	8th
2019	Kartsport NZ National Sprint Championship - Rotax Max Light class	11th
2022	CIK Trophy of New Zealand - Vortex Rok DVS Senior	6th
2023	Kartsport Auckland City of Sails - Vortex Rok DVS Senior	**2nd**
2023	Kartstars New Zealand - Vortex Rok DVS	12th

=== Racing career summary ===
Season	Series	Team	Races	Wins	Poles	F/Laps	Podiums	Points	Position
2004	Formula BMW ADAC	Team Rosberg	20	0	0	0	8	168	4th
2005	Formula BMW ADAC	Team Rosberg	20	1	0	1	5	149	4th
2006	Formula Renault 2.0 Eurocup	JD Motorsport	14	2	2	1	6	91	**2nd**
2006	Formula Renault 2.0 NEC	JD Motorsport	14	4	7	4	7	267	**2nd**
2007	International Formula Master	JD Motorsport	16	2	1	2	7	65	**2nd**
2008	International Formula Master	JD Motorsport	16	6	6	8	10	101	**1st**
2008–09	GP2 Asia Series	Trident Racing	3	0	0	0	0	5	18th
2008–09	A1 Grand Prix	New Zealand	4	0	0	0	0	36†	7th†
2009	Formula Renault 3.5 Series	Epsilon Euskadi	17	0	0	0	1	41	11th
2010	Superleague Formula	Olympiacos CFP	18	4	2	3	10	653†	4th†
2010	Superleague Formula	Galatasaray	3	0	0	0	0	358†	13th†
2011	Superleague Formula	New Zealand	3	0	0	0	0	116†	7th†
2011	Formula Renault 3.5 Series	Mofaz Racing	7	0	0	0	1	43	12th
2012	Auto GP World Series	Manor MP Motorsport	12	1	0	0	4	127	4th
2012	Italian GT Championship - GT3	Bhaitech Racing	6	0	0	1	0	18	19th
2013	International GT Open	Bhai Tech Racing	15	1	3	0	3	37	8th
2014	Blancpain Sprint Series	Bhaitech	6	0	0	0	0	12	20th
2014	Blancpain Sprint Series	Boutsen Ginion	2	0	0	0	0	12	20th
2014	Blancpain Endurance Series - Pro-Am	Boutsen Ginion	3	0	0	0	0	0	NC
2015	Porsche Carrera Cup Asia	Kamlung Racing	14	7	4	4	10	234	**1st**
2016	ADAC GT Masters	KÜS Team75 Bernhard	2	0	0	0	0	0	NC
2016	International V8 Supercars Championship	Erebus Motorsport	3	0	0	0	0	234	49th
2016	Porsche Carrera Cup Asia	Team Porsche Holding	1	1	1	0	1	0	NC‡
2017	Porsche Carrera Cup Asia	Team Formax	13	3	4	3	10	235	**1st**
2017	Chinese GT3 Championship	JRM JiaRui-TengDa	12	2	1	1	8	175	**2nd**
2018	Porsche Carrera Cup Asia	Team Formax	13	4	4	1	9	230	**1st**
2019	Lamborghini Super Trofeo Asia - Pro	Gama Racing	12	8	4	4	11	129	**2nd**
2019	Blancpain GT World Challenge Asia Pro-Am Cup	JRM JiaRui-TengDa	10	0	0	1	4	115	6th
2019	Porsche Carrera Cup Asia	Kamlung Racing	8	1	0	1	5	105	7th
2021	Toyota Racing Series	Tasman Motorsports Group	3	0	1	0	2	71	9th
2021	TCR New Zealand Touring Car Championship	TrackTec Racing	3	2	0	?	0	199	**1st**
2023	Formula Regional Oceania Championship	Hamilton Motorsport	3	0	0	0	0	0	NC‡
2023	Porsche Carrera Cup Australia	Earl Bamber Motorsport	3	0	0	1	3	144	23rd
2023	Porsche Carrera Cup Asia	Team Shanghai Yongda	14	4	1	1	11	271	**2nd**
2023	Lamborghini Super Trofeo Asia - Pro	Absolute Racing	12	11	2	4	12	185	**1st**
2023	Lamborghini Super Trofeo World Final - Pro	Absolute Racing	2	0	0	0	0	1	13th
2024	Porsche Carrera Cup Asia	TORO Racing	2	1	1	0	2	0	NC‡
2024	Lamborghini Super Trofeo Asia - Pro	Absolute Racing	4	3	3	1	4	59	5th
2024–25	Asian Le Mans Series - GT	Absolute Racing							
2025	TSS The Super Series - GT3	Amerasian Fragrance by AF Racing							
2025	Lamborghini Super Trofeo Asia - Pro-Am	VSR	4	3	1	1	4	0	NC‡
2026	Porsche Carrera Cup Asia	Bergwerk	2	0	0	0	0	0	NC‡
2026	Lamborghini Super Trofeo Europe - Pro-Am	HZO Fortis Racing by Leipert Motorsport	4	0	0	0	0	24	7th
2026	Lamborghini Super Trofeo Europe - Pro-Am	Leipert Motorsport	1	0	0	0	1	24	7th
2026	Lamborghini Super Trofeo Asia - Pro-Am	VSR	12	12	9	10	12	189	**1st**
2026	Lamborghini Super Trofeo North America - Pro-Am	XONINE RACING	2	0	0	0	0	7	10th
2026	TSS The Super Series - GT3	Team NZ Motorsport							

^{†} Team standings.

‡ As van der Drift was a guest driver, he was ineligible to score points.

=== Complete New Zealand Grand Prix results ===
Year	Team	Car	Qualifying	Main race
2006	(New Zealand) International Motorsport	Tatuus TT104ZZ - Toyota	?	DNF
2021	(New Zealand) Tasman Motorsports	Tatuus FT-60 - Toyota	**3rd**	5th
2023	(New Zealand) Hamilton Motorsport	Tatuus FT-60 - Toyota	9th	4th

=== Complete Eurocup Formula Renault 2.0 results ===
(key) (Races in bold indicate pole position; races in italics indicate fastest lap)

Year	Entrant	1	2	3	4	5	6	7	8	9	10	11	12	13	14	DC	Points
2006	JD Motorsport	ZOL; 1; 2	ZOL; 2; 20	IST; 1; 8	IST; 2; 4	MIS; 1; 4	MIS; 2; 1	NÜR; 1; 3	NÜR; 2; 3	**DON**; **1**; 11	DON; 2; 1	LMS; 1 Ret	LMS; 2; 11	CAT; 1; 22	CAT; 2; 6	2nd	91

=== Complete Formula Renault 2.0 NEC results ===
(key) (Races in bold indicate pole position) (Races in italics indicate fastest lap)

Year	Entrant	1	2	3	4	5	6	7	8	9	10	11	12	13	14	15	16	DC	Points
2006	JD Motorsport	OSC; 1; 1	**OSC**; **2**; 10	SPA; 1; 3	**SPA**; **2**; 10	**NÜR**; **1**; 16	**NÜR**; **2**; 1	**ZAN**; **1**; 1	**ZAN**; **2**; 1	OSC; 1; 5	OSC; 2; 2	ASS; 1	ASS; 2	AND; 1; 3	AND; 2; 7	SAL; 1; 12	SAL; 2; 4	2nd	267

=== Complete GP2 Series results ===
==== Complete GP2 Asia Series results ====
(key) (Races in bold indicate pole position) (Races in italics indicate fastest lap)

Year	Entrant	1	2	3	4	5	6	7	8	9	10	11	12	DC	Points
2008–09	Trident Racing	CHN; FEA; 7	CHN; SPR; 4	UAE; FEA; Ret	UAE; SPR; C	BHR; FEA	BHR; SPR	QAT; FEA	QAT; SPR	MAL; FEA	MAL; SPR	BHR; FEA	BHR; SPR	18th	5

=== Complete A1 Grand Prix results ===
(key)

Year	Entrant	1	2	3	4	5	6	7	8	9	10	11	12	13	14	DC	Points
2008–09	New Zealand	NED; SPR	NED; FEA	CHN; SPR; 7	CHN; FEA; 11	MYS; SPR	MYS; FEA	NZL; SPR; 5	NZL; FEA; 13	RSA; SPR	RSA; FEA	POR; SPR	POR; FEA	GBR; SPR	GBR; FEA	7th	36

=== Complete Formula Renault 3.5 Series results ===
(key) (Races in bold indicate pole position) (Races in italics indicate fastest lap)

Year	Team	1	2	3	4	5	6	7	8	9	10	11	12	13	14	15	16	17	Pos	Points
2009	Epsilon Euskadi	CAT; 1; 7	CAT; 2; 3	SPA; 1; 9	SPA; 2 Ret	MON; 1; 7	HUN; 1; 13	HUN; 2; 4	SIL; 1 Ret	SIL; 2; 19	LEM; 1; 15	LEM; 2; 11	ALG; 1 Ret	ALG; 2; 7	NÜR; 1; 14	NÜR; 2; 10	ALC; 1; 9	ALC; 2; 8	11th	41
2011	Mofaz Racing	ALC; 1; 8	ALC; 2; 13	SPA; 1; 11	SPA; 2; 3	MNZ; 1; 4	MNZ; 2; 6	MON; 1; 8	NÜR; 1	NÜR; 2	HUN; 1	HUN; 2	SIL; 1	SIL; 2	LEC; 1	LEC; 2	CAT; 1	CAT; 2	12th	43

=== Superleague Formula ===
(key) (Races in bold indicate pole position) (Races in italics indicate fastest lap)

Year	Team	Operator	1			2			3			4			5			6			7			8	9	10	11	12			Position	Points
2010	Olympiacos CFP	GU-Racing International	SIL			ASS			MAG			JAR			NÜR			ZOL			BRH			ADR	POR	ORD	BEI †	NAV			4th	653
2010	Olympiacos CFP	GU-Racing International	13	2	3	15	1	X	3	12	X	3	12	1	3	11	1	**1**	8	**2**	7	6	DNS‡								4th	653
2010	Galatasaray	Barazi-Epsilon																										17	7	X	13th	358
2011	Team New Zealand	Atech Reid Grand Prix	HOL			BEL																									7th	116
2011	Team New Zealand	Atech Reid Grand Prix				5	7	6																							7th	116

‡ Chris van der Drift qualified for the Super Final at Brands Hatch but was unable to compete due to suffering injuries from a large crash in race two which led to him being taken to hospital with a broken ankle, two broken ribs, a cracked shoulder blade, a dislocated shoulder and two broken fingers. His Super Final place was taken up by the seventh highest points-scorer of the weekend, Yelmer Buurman.

† Non Championship round

=== Complete Auto GP World Series results ===
(key) (Races in bold indicate pole position) (Races in italics indicate fastest lap)

Year	Entrant	1	2	3	4	5	6	7	8	9	10	11	12	13	14	Pos	Points
2012	Manor MP Motorsport	MNZ; 1; 5	MNZ; 2; 2	VAL; 1; 6	VAL; 2; 7	MAR; 1; 4	MAR; 2; 1	HUN; 1; 7	HUN; 2; 5	ALG; 1; 8	ALG; 2; 2	CUR; 1; 5	CUR; 2; 2	SON; 1	SON; 2	4th	127

=== Complete Bathurst 12 Hour results ===
Year	Team	Co-Drivers	Car	Class	Laps	Pos.	Class Pos.
2015	(New Zealand) Motorsport Services	(United Kingdom) Frank Lyons (United Kingdom) Michael Lyons	Porsche 997 GT3 Cup	B	193	32nd	8th
2016	(New Zealand) Motorsport Services Limited	(New Zealand) Allan Dippie (New Zealand) Scott O'Donnell	Porsche 997 GT3 Cup	B	128	DNF	DNF
2018	(Australia) Team Carrera Cup Asia	(Singapore) Andrew Tang (Taiwan) Evan Chen (Australia) Paul Tresidder	Porsche 991 GT3 Cup	B	82	DNF	DNF
2019	(Singapore) Team Carrera Cup Asia	(Germany) Philip Hamprecht (China) Bao Jinlong (Australia) Paul Tresidder	Porsche 991 GT3 Cup	B	279	19th	**2nd**

=== Complete Stock Car Brasil results ===
Year	Team	Car	1	2	3	4	5	6	7	8	9	10	11	12	13	14	15	16	17	18	19	20	21	Rank	Points
2015	União Quimica Bassani	Peugeot 408	GOI; 1; 26	RBP; 1	RBP; 2	VEL; 1	VEL; 2	CUR; 1	CUR; 2	SCZ; 1	SCZ; 2	CUR; 1	CUR; 2	GOI; 1	CAS; 1	CAS; 2	BRA; 1	BRA; 2	CUR; 1	CUR; 2	TAR; 1	TAR; 2	INT; 1	NC	-
2018	Vogel Motorsport	Chevrolet Cruze	INT; 1 Ret	CUR; 1	CUR; 2	VEL; 1	VEL; 2	LON; 1	LON; 2	SCZ; 1	SCZ; 2	TBA; 1	TBA; 1	TBA; 2	CAS; 1	CAS; 2	VCA; 1	VCA; 2	TAR; 1	TAR; 2	TBA; 1	TBA; 2	INT; 1	NC	-

=== Supercars Championship results ===
Supercars results
Year	Team	Car	1	2	3	4	5	6	7	8	9	10	11	12	13	14	15	16	17	18	19	20	21	22	23	24	25	26	27	28	29	30	Position	Points
2016	Erebus Motorsport	Holden Commodore (VF)	ADE; R1	ADE; R2	ADE; R3	SYM; R4	SYM; R5	PHI; R6	PHI; R7	BAR; R8	BAR; R9	WIN; R10	WIN; R11	HID; R12	HID; R13	TOW; R14	TOW; R15	QLD; R16	QLD; R17	SMP; R18	SMP; R19	SAN; QR; Ret	SAN; R20; 22	BAT; R21; 17	SUR; R22; 19	SUR; R23; DNS	PUK; R24	PUK; R25	PUK; R26	PUK; R27	SYD; R28	SYD; R29	49th	234

=== Bathurst 1000 results ===
Year	Team	Car	Co-driver	Position	Lap
2016	Erebus Motorsport	Holden Commodore (VF)	(Australia) Shae Davies	17th	156

Sporting positions
Preceded by Jérôme d'Ambrosio	International Formula Master; Champion; 2008	Succeeded by Fabio Leimer
Preceded by Earl Bamber	Porsche Carrera Cup Asia; Champion; 2015	Succeeded by Nico Menzel
Preceded by Nico Menzel	Porsche Carrera Cup Asia; Champion; 2017 - 2018	Succeeded by Philip Hamprecht
Preceded by Inaugural	TCR New Zealand Touring Car; Champion; 2021	Succeeded by Incumbent
