= 2021 TCR New Zealand Touring Car Championship =

Motor racing competition

The 2021 TCR New Zealand Touring Car Championship (known for commercial reasons as the Allied Petroleum TCR New Zealand Championship) will be the inaugural season of the TCR New Zealand Touring Car Championship.

2021 New Zealand Touring Car Championship Logo

== Teams and drivers ==
All teams are based and registered in New Zealand.

| Team | Car | No | Drivers | Ref |
|---|---|---|---|---|
| (New Zealand) Racer Products | Hyundai i30 N TCR | 5 | (New Zealand) Gene Rollinson | |
| (New Zealand) Paddon Rallysport | Hyundai i30 N TCR | 20 | (New Zealand) Hayden Paddon | |
| (New Zealand) Jaden Ransley Racing | Hyundai i30 N TCR | 53 | (New Zealand) Jaden Ransley | |
| (New Zealand) TrackTec Racing | Audi RS 3 LMS TCR | 7 | (New Zealand) Chris van der Drift | |
| (New Zealand) TrackTec Racing | Audi RS 3 LMS TCR | 26 | (New Zealand) Lochlainn Fitzgerald-Symes | |
| (New Zealand) TrackTec Racing | Audi RS 3 LMS TCR | 51 | (New Zealand) Greg Murphy | |
| (New Zealand) Evolution Motorsport | Honda Civic Type R TCR (FK8) | 23 | (New Zealand) Jordan Michels | |
| (New Zealand) M-Developments | Volkswagen Golf GTI TCR | 79 | (New Zealand) Paul Radisich | |

== Race calendar ==
The 2020 calendar was announced on April 30, 2019. It was also announced that the summer scheduled (labelled the Sprint Championship) was scheduled to be followed by an endurance series later on in the year. The series was later rescheduled for the second half of 2020, then for March 2021 with three rounds.

| Round | Circuit | Date |
|---|---|---|
| 1 | (New Zealand) Highlands Motorsport Park | 23-24 April |

== Results ==
=== Summary ===
| Round | Race | Circuit | Pole position | Winning driver | Winning team |
|---|---|---|---|---|---|
| 1 | 1 | Highlands Motorsport Park | (New Zealand) Hayden Paddon | (New Zealand) Chris van der Drift | TrackTec Racing |
| 1 | 2 | Highlands Motorsport Park | | (New Zealand) Chris van der Drift | TrackTec Racing |
| 1 | 3 | Highlands Motorsport Park | | (New Zealand) Hayden Paddon | Paddon Rallysport |

=== Standings ===
| Pos. | Driver | No. | HIG (New Zealand) | | | Points |
| Pos. | Driver | No. | RD1 | RD2 | RD3 | Points |
|---|---|---|---|---|---|---|
| 1 | (New Zealand) Chris van der Drift | 7 | 1 | 1 | 5 | 199 |
| 2 | (New Zealand) Jordan Michels | 23 | 5 | 7 | 3 | 147 |
| 3 | (New Zealand) Lochlainn Fitzgerald-Symes | 26 | 4 | 8 | 4 | 147 |
| 4 | (New Zealand) Gene Rollinson | 5 | 2 | 2 | Ret | 134 |
| 5 | (New Zealand) Hayden Paddon | 20 | Ret | 4 | 1 | 129 |
| 6 | (New Zealand) Greg Murphy | 51 | 3 | 3 | Ret | 120 |
| 7 | (New Zealand) Jaden Ransley | 53 | Ret | 5 | 2 | 115 |
| 8 | (New Zealand) Paul Radisich | 79 | 6 | 6 | Ret | 94 |
| Pos. | Driver | No. | HIG (New Zealand) | | | Points |
