= 2018 Porsche Carrera Cup Asia =

Motorsport racing season

The 2018 Porsche Carrera Cup Asia was the sixteenth running of the Porsche Carrera Cup Asia series. It began on April 13 at the Shanghai International Circuit and finished on November 16 at the same circuit.

Chris van der Drift successfully defended his championship, winning the title by 24 points over nearest competitor, Philip Hamprecht.

== Calendar ==
The following venues hosted at least one round of the 2018 championship.

Round		Circuit	Date	Supporting
1	R1	Shanghai International Circuit, Shanghai, China	April 15	Formula One World Championship
2	R2	Fuji International Speedway, Oyama, Japan	June 16–17	One Make Series Festival
2	R3	Fuji International Speedway, Oyama, Japan	June 16–17	One Make Series Festival
3	R4	Bangsaen Street Circuit, Bang Saen Beach, Thailand	July 14–15	Bangsaen Grand Prix; TCR Asia Series; TCR Thailand Touring Car Championship
3	R5	Bangsaen Street Circuit, Bang Saen Beach, Thailand	July 14–15	Bangsaen Grand Prix; TCR Asia Series; TCR Thailand Touring Car Championship
4	R6	Sydney Motorsport Park, New South Wales, Australia	August 3–4	Supercars Championship; Australian GT Championship
4	R7	Sydney Motorsport Park, New South Wales, Australia	August 3–4	Supercars Championship; Australian GT Championship
5	R8	Marina Bay Street Circuit, Marina Bay, Singapore	September 16	Formula One World Championship
6	R9	Sepang International Circuit, Selangor, Malaysia	September 29–30	Malaysia Championship Series; Asian Formula Renault Series
6	R10	Sepang International Circuit, Selangor, Malaysia	September 29–30	Malaysia Championship Series; Asian Formula Renault Series
7	R11	Shanghai International Circuit, Shanghai, China	November 17–18	FIA World Endurance Championship
7	R12	Shanghai International Circuit, Shanghai, China	November 17–18	FIA World Endurance Championship

== Teams and drivers ==
Entrant	No	Driver	Class	Rounds
(China) Kamlung Racing	1	(New Zealand) Chris van der Drift	P	All
(China) Kamlung Racing	68	(South Africa) Jordan Pepper	P	1–5
(China) Kamlung Racing	68	(Hong Kong) Mak Hing Tak	PA	6–12
(Hong Kong) Prince Racing	2	(Macau) Liu Lic Ka	PA	1–3, 8
(Hong Kong) Prince Racing	2	(Hong Kong) Kenneth Lau	PA	4–7, 9–12
(Hong Kong) OpenRoad Racing	3	(Indonesia) Michael S.	PA	1, 4–5, 8
(Hong Kong) OpenRoad Racing	18	(Hong Kong) Marcel Tjia	PA	9–12
(Hong Kong) OpenRoad Racing	21	(Hong Kong) Francis Tjia	PA	All
(Hong Kong) OpenRoad Racing	69	(Canada) Christian Chia	PA	2, 6–7
(China) Novu Racing Team	5	(Singapore) Yuey Tan	P	1, 8
(Hong Kong) Absolute Racing	7	(China) Li Jiaqi	P	2–5, 8, 11–12
(Hong Kong) Absolute Racing	66	(France) Maxime Jousse	P	1–7
(Hong Kong) Absolute Racing	918	(Netherlands) Sandra van der Sloot	PA	11–12
Racing Spirit Thailand	8	(Thailand) Sontaya Kunplome	PA	2–3, 6–8, 11–12
Racing Spirit Thailand	8	(Thailand) Preeda Tantemsabya	PA	9–10
(China) Porsche Beijing Centre	9	(China) Li Chao	PA	All
(New Zealand) Earl Bamber Motorsport	10	(Hong Kong) Samson Chan	PA	1–3
(New Zealand) Earl Bamber Motorsport	10	(New Zealand) Graeme Dowsett	PA	6–8
(New Zealand) Earl Bamber Motorsport	10	(New Zealand) Reid Harker	P	9–10
(New Zealand) Earl Bamber Motorsport	11	(Chinese Taipei) Jeffrey Chiang	PA	All
(New Zealand) Earl Bamber Motorsport	12	(New Zealand) Will Bamber	P	All
(New Zealand) Earl Bamber Motorsport	27	(Malaysia) Adrian Henry D'Silva	PA	11–12
(Thailand) est cola PTT	15	(Thailand) Tanart Sathienthirakul	P	All
(Hong Kong) Modena Motorsports	16	(Hong Kong) Wayne Shen	PA	1–10
(Hong Kong) Modena Motorsports	16	(Denmark) Benny Simonsen	P	11–12
(Hong Kong) Modena Motorsports	28	(Hong Kong) John Shen	PA	All
(Hong Kong) Modena Motorsports	33	(Hong Kong) Antares Au	PA	All
(Malaysia) Arrows Racing	17	(Hong Kong) Fung Yui Sum	PA	All
(Hong Kong) LKM Racing	22	(Japan) Yuta Kamimura	PA	8
(Hong Kong) LKM Racing	22	(Hong Kong) Siu Yuk Lung	PA	1–7, 9–12
(Australia) Paul Tresidder Racing	23	(Australia) Paul Tresidder	PA	All
(China) Zheng Tong Auto	55	(China) Bao Jinlong	PA	All
Porsche China Junior Team	59	(China) Daniel Lu Wenlong	P	All
(Indonesia) Presido Jakarta Ban Racing	62	(Indonesia) Ahmad F. Alam	P	All
(China) Team Jebsen	77	(China) Cui Yue	P	All
True Visions Motorsports Thailand	78	(Thailand) Suttiluck Buncharoen	PA	All
(Germany) Team Porsche Holding	86	(Austria) Martin Ragginger	P	All
(China) Porsche Shanghai Waigaoqiao	88	(China) Bo Yuan	P	All
(Malaysia) KiddyWorld Racing	98	(Hong Kong) Eric Kwong	PA	All
(Singapore) Team StarChase	99	(Germany) Philip Hamprecht	P	All

== Calendar ==
The series contested of 12-rounds, which started at the Shanghai International Circuit on the 15th of April and concluded at the same circuit on the 18th of November.

Rnd	Circuit	Pole position	Fastest lap	Winning driver	Winning team	Pro-Am Winner
R1	(China) Shanghai	(Germany) Philip Hamprecht	(New Zealand) Chris van der Drift	(Germany) Philip Hamprecht	Team StarChase	(Hong Kong) Wayne Shen
R2	(Japan) Fuji	(New Zealand) Chris van der Drift	(New Zealand) Chris van der Drift	(New Zealand) Chris van der Drift	Kamlung Racing	(China) Li Chao
R3	(Japan) Fuji	(New Zealand) Chris van der Drift	(Germany) Philip Hamprecht	(Germany) Philip Hamprecht	Team StarChase	(China) Bao Jinlong
R4	(Thailand) Bangsaen	(New Zealand) Chris van der Drift	(Austria) Martin Ragginger	(New Zealand) Chris van der Drift	Kamlung Racing	(Hong Kong) Francis Tjia
R5	(Thailand) Bangsaen	(Germany) Philip Hamprecht	(South Africa) Jordan Pepper	(Germany) Philip Hamprecht	Team StarChase	(China) Bao Jinlong
R6	(Australia) Sydney	(Austria) Martin Ragginger	(Austria) Martin Ragginger	(Austria) Martin Ragginger	Team Porsche Holding	(China) Bao Jinlong
R7	(Australia) Sydney	(Austria) Martin Ragginger	(Germany) Philip Hamprecht	(Germany) Philip Hamprecht	Team StarChase	(China) Li Chao
R8	Singapore	(Germany) Philip Hamprecht	(New Zealand) Chris van der Drift	(New Zealand) Chris van der Drift	Kamlung Racing	(Singapore) Yuey Tan
R9	(Malaysia) Sepang	(New Zealand) Will Bamber	(New Zealand) Will Bamber	(New Zealand) Will Bamber	Earl Bamber Motorsport	(Hong Kong) Francis Tjia
R10	(Malaysia) Sepang	(Austria) Martin Ragginger	(Austria) Martin Ragginger	(Austria) Martin Ragginger	Team Porsche Holding	(Hong Kong) Francis Tjia
R11	(China) Shanghai	(New Zealand) Chris van der Drift	(New Zealand) Will Bamber	(New Zealand) Chris van der Drift	Kamlung Racing	(Netherlands) Sandra van der Sloot
R12	(China) Shanghai	(New Zealand) Chris van der Drift	(Austria) Martin Ragginger	(Austria) Martin Ragginger	Team Porsche Holding	(Netherlands) Sandra van der Sloot

== Championship standings ==
=== Overall ===
Pos.	Driver	SHA1 (China)	FUJ (Japan)		BAN (Thailand)		SYD (Australia)		SIN (Singapore)	SEP (Malaysia)		SHA2 (China)		Pts.
1	(New Zealand) Chris van der Drift	3	1	2	1	2	2	5	1	5	3	1	5	230
2	(Germany) Philip Hamprecht	1	3	1	Ret	1	3	1	5	4	4	5	2	206
3	(Austria) Martin Ragginger	5	2	Ret	2	21	1	3	2	3	1	4	1	197
4	(New Zealand) Will Bamber	6	5	3	Ret	3	Ret	4	3	1	2	2	Ret	163
5	(China) Cui Yue	7	4	5	5	20	6	6	8	7	7	3	7	139
6	(Thailand) Tanart Sathienthirakul	8	Ret	Ret	20	5	4	7	4	2	5	10	3	131
7	(China) Daniel Lu Wenlong	9	Ret	4	15	10	8	12	6	8	6	6	Ret	98
8	(France) Maxime Jousse	2	Ret	DSQ	3	4	7	2						95
9	(Hong Kong) Francis Tjia	14	8	8	6	8	10	Ret	20	10	11	11	6	94
10	(China) Bo Yuan	10	Ret	6	Ret	6	5	8	23	6	8	7	Ret	93
11	(China) Bao Jinlong	13	Ret	7	7	7	9	11	10	12	12	12	12	89
12	(China) Li Chao	16	6	12	10	23	21	9	11	13	15	13	9	71
13	(Hong Kong) Wayne Shen	11	10	9	8	9	11	10	Ret	14	13			71
14	(Indonesia) Ahmad L. Alam	Ret	Ret	11	14	Ret	12	15	13	11	10	15	11	57
15	(Thailand) Suttiluck Buncharoen	12	7	10	17	13	19	16	26	17	20	16	8	53
16	(Hong Kong) Antares Au	15	15	13	11	14	16	Ret	14	15	Ret	18	10	43
17	(South Africa) Jordan Pepper	4	20	DSQ	4	Ret								39
18	(Hong Kong) Eric Kwong	21	9	17	13	16	18	Ret	15	18	14	14	Ret	38
19	(Hong Kong) John Shen	19	14	Ret	Ret	12	14	14	12	16	16	17	Ret	37
20	(Canada) Christian Chia		12	16			13	13						30
21	(Australia) Paul Tresidder	Ret	Ret	14	12	15	15	17	17	21	19	21	Ret	28
22	(Chinese Taipei) Jeffrey Chiang	22	19	19	19	17	17	19	21	19	22	19	13	24
23	(Hong Kong) Siu Yuk Lung	23	17	20	Ret	DNS	22	21		22	Ret	25	18	21
24	(Hong Kong) Fung Yui Sum	25	21	21	18	18	26	23	25	26	24	28	20	20
25	(Thailand) Sontaya Kunplome		18	18			23	18	19			27	Ret	20
26	(Macau) Liu Lic Ka	4	11	22					18					15
27	(Hong Kong) Samson Chan	17	13	15										14
28	(Hong Kong) Kenneth Lau				21	19	24	22		20	18	24	16	13
29	(Hong Kong) Mak Hing Tak						25	24	16	25	23	22	17	12
30	(Indonesia) Michael S.	18			9	11			22					12
31	(China) Li Jiaqi		16	Ret	16	22			24			26	14	10
32	(New Zealand) Graeme Dowsett						20	20	Ret					10
33	(Japan) Yuta Kamimura								7					9
34	(Singapore) Yuey Tan	Ret							9					7
35	(Thailand) Preeda Tantemsabya									24	21			0
Guest drivers ineligible for points
-	(Netherlands) Sandra van der Sloot											8	4	0
-	(Denmark) Benny Simonsen											9	21	0
-	(Malaysia) Adrian Henry D'Silva											20	19	0
-	(Hong Kong) Marcel Tjia											23	15	0
Pos.	Driver	SHA1 (China)	FUJ (Japan)		BAN (Thailand)		SYD (Australia)		SIN (Singapore)	SEP (Malaysia)		SHA2 (China)		Pts.

=== Pro-Am ===
Pos.	Driver	SHA1 (China)	FUJ (Japan)		BAN (Thailand)		SYD (Australia)		SIN (Singapore)	SEP (Malaysia)		SHA2 (China)		Pts.
1	(China) Bao Jinlong	13	Ret	7	7	7	9	11	10	12	12			189
2	(Hong Kong) Francis Tjia	14	8	8	6	8	10	Ret	20	10	11			174
3	(Hong Kong) Wayne Shen	11	10	9	8	9	11	10	Ret	14	13			167
4	(China) Li Chao	16	6	12	10	23	21	9	11	13	15			143
5	(Thailand) Suttiluck Buncharoen	12	7	10	17	13	19	16	26	17	20			118
6	(Hong Kong) John Shen	19	14	Ret	Ret	12	14	14	12	16	16			104
7	(Hong Kong) Antares Au	15	15	13	11	14	16	Ret	14	15	Ret			100
8	(Hong Kong) Eric Kwong	21	9	17	13	16	18	Ret	15	18	14			99
9	(Australia) Paul Tresidder	Ret	Ret	14	12	15	15	17	17	21	19			86
10	(Chinese Taipei) Jeffrey Chiang	22	19	19	19	17	17	19	21	19	22			66
11	(Canada) Christian Chia		12	16			13	13						64
12	(Thailand) Sontaya Kunplome		18	18			23	18	19					44
13	(Hong Kong) Fung Yui Sum	25	21	21	18	18	26	23	25	26	24			43
14	(Hong Kong) Siu Yuk Lung	23	17	20	Ret	DNS	22	21		22	Ret			42
15	(Indonesia) Michael S.	18			9	11			22					39
16	(Hong Kong) Samson Chan	17	13	15										35
17	(Macau) Liu Lic Ka	20	11	22					18					34
17	(Hong Kong) Kenneth Lau				21	19	24	22		20	18			34
19	(Hong Kong) Mak Hing Tak						25	24	16	25	23			28
20	(China) Li Jiaqi		16	Ret	16	22			24					27
21	(Singapore) Yuey Tan	Ret							9					22
22	(New Zealand) Graeme Dowsett						20	20	Ret					21
23	(Thailand) Preeda Tantemsabya									24	21			11
Guest drivers ineligible for points
-	(Netherlands) Sandra van der Sloot											8	4	0
-	(Malaysia) Adrian Henry D'Silva											20	19	0
-	(Hong Kong) Marcel Tjia											23	15	0
Pos.	Driver	SHA1 (China)	FUJ (Japan)		BAN (Thailand)		SYD (Australia)		SIN (Singapore)	SEP (Malaysia)		SHA2 (China)		Pts.

=== Dealer Trophy ===
Pos.	Driver	SHA1 (China)	FUJ (Japan)		BAN (Thailand)		SYD (Australia)		SIN (Singapore)	SEP (Malaysia)		SHA2 (China)		Pts.
1	(Singapore) Team StarChase	1	2	1	Ret	1	2	1	2	2	2	3	2	204
2	(Germany) Team Porsche Holding	3	1	Ret	1	Ret	1	2	1	1	1	2	1	192
3	(China) Team Jebsen	4	3	2	3	Ret	4	3	3	4	3	1	3	176
4	(China) Zheng Tong Auto	6	Ret	4	4	3	5	6	4	5	5	5	5	138
5	(China) Porsche Beijing Central & Goldenport	7	4	5	5	Ret	6	5	5	6	6	6	4	125
6	(China) Porsche Shanghai Waigaoqiao Pudong	5	Ret	3	DNS	2	3	4	7	3	4	4	Ret	120
7	(China) Kamlung Racing	2	5	Ret	2	Ret	7	7	6	7	7	7	6	113
Pos.	Driver	SHA1 (China)	FUJ (Japan)		BAN (Thailand)		SYD (Australia)		SIN (Singapore)	SEP (Malaysia)		SHA2 (China)		Pts.
