= 2019 Porsche Carrera Cup Asia =

Motorsport racing season

The 2019 Porsche Carrera Cup Asia was the seventeenth season of the Porsche Carrera Cup Asia. The season commenced on April 12 at the Shanghai International Circuit and finished at the same circuit on November 10.

In a closely-fought championship, Philip Hamprecht held off rivals Martin Ragginger and Will Bamber to secure the championship by 18 points over the former. Bao Jinlong retained the Pro-Am championship while Team StarChase claimed the Dealer's Trophy.

== Calendar ==
The following venues hosted at least one round of the 2019 championship.

Round	Circuit	Date	Supporting
1	Shanghai International Circuit, Shanghai, China	12–14 April	Chinese Grand Prix; F4 Chinese Championship
2	Suzuka Circuit, Suzuka, Japan	24–26 May	F4 Japanese Championship; Porsche Carrera Cup Japan
3	Fuji Speedway, Oyama, Japan	14–16 June	Porsche Carrera Cup Japan
4	Sepang International Circuit, Selangor, Malaysia	12–14 July	Malaysia Championship Series
5	Bangsaen Street Circuit, Bang Saen, Thailand	30 August–1 September	Thailand Super Series; TCR Asia Series
6	Marina Bay Street Circuit, Marina Bay, Singapore	20–22 September	Singapore Grand Prix; Ferrari Challenge Asia-Pacific
7	Shanghai International Circuit, Shanghai, China	8–10 November	FIA World Endurance Championship

== Teams and drivers ==
Team	No.	Driver	Class	Rounds
(Hong Kong) Kamlung Racing	1	(New Zealand) Chris van der Drift	P	1–4
(Hong Kong) Kamlung Racing	68	(Hong Kong) Mak Hing Tak	PA	6
(Hong Kong) Kamlung Racing	68	(France) Maxime Jousse	P	7
(Hong Kong) OpenRoad Racing	3	(Indonesia) Michael Soeryadjaya	PA	2, 4, 6–7
(Hong Kong) OpenRoad Racing	18	(Hong Kong) Marcel Tjia	PA	1, 4–7
(Hong Kong) OpenRoad Racing	21	(Hong Kong) Francis Tjia	PA	All
(Hong Kong) OpenRoad Racing	69	(Canada) Christian Chia	PA	1, 3, 5–7
(New Zealand) EBM	4	(New Zealand) Reid Harker	P	7
(New Zealand) EBM	10	(Japan) Tsubasa Kondo	P	2
(New Zealand) EBM	10	(New Zealand) Graeme Dowsett	PA	4, 6
(New Zealand) EBM	10	(New Zealand) Reid Harker	P	5
(New Zealand) EBM	11	(Chinese Taipei) Peter Yang Liao	PA	1–4, 6
(New Zealand) EBM	17	(China) Hong Shijie	PA	1
(New Zealand) EBM	22	(Hong Kong) Siu Yuk Lung	PA	3
(New Zealand) EBM	33	(Hong Kong) Antares Au	PA	All
(New Zealand) EBM	53	(United States) Riley Dickinson	P	7
(New Zealand) EBM	61	(Malaysia) Adrian Henry D'Silva	PA	1–4, 7
(New Zealand) EBM	61	(Singapore) Keong Wee Lim	PA	5
(New Zealand) EBM	65	(Malaysia) Douglas Khoo	PA	6
(Singapore) Novu Racing Team	5	(Singapore) Yuey Tan	PA	All
(Hong Kong) Modena Motorsports	6	(Chinese Taipei) Jeffrey Chiang	PA	3
(Hong Kong) Modena Motorsports	16	(Denmark) Benny Simonsen	P	1–4
(Hong Kong) Modena Motorsports	28	(Hong Kong) John Shen	PA	All
(China) Porsche Beijing Central & Goldenport	9	(China) Li Chao	PA	1–3, 5–7
(China) Porsche Beijing Central & Goldenport	9	(Malaysia) Timothy Yeo	PA	4
Team Porsche New Zealand	12	(New Zealand) Will Bamber	P	All
(Thailand) Bunjong Motorsports	15	(Thailand) Tanart Sathienthirakul	P	All
(Australia) Paul Tresidder Racing	23	(Australia) Paul Tresidder	PA	All
(China) Zheng Tong Auto	55	(China) Bao Jinlong	PA	1–3, 5–7
(China) Zheng Tong Auto	55	(Indonesia) Andrew Haryanto	PA	4
Porsche China Junior Team	59	(China) Daniel Lu Wenlong	P	All
(Indonesia) Presido Jakarta Ban Racing	62	(Indonesia) Ahmad F. Alam	PA	All
(Hong Kong) Team Jebsen	77	(China) Cui Yue	P	All
True Visions Motorsports Thailand	78	(Thailand) Suttiluck Buncharoen	PA	All
(Germany) Team Porsche Holding	86	(Austria) Martin Ragginger	P	All
(Hong Kong) Absolute Racing	88	(China) Yuan Bo	P	1–2
(Hong Kong) Absolute Racing	88	(Thailand) Kantadhee Kusiri	P	3
(Hong Kong) Absolute Racing	88	(Indonesia) Anderson Tanoto	PA	4
(Hong Kong) KiddyWorld Racing	93	(Hong Kong) Eric Kwong	PA	All
(Singapore) Team StarChase	99	(Germany) Philip Hamprecht	P	All

Icon	Class
P	Pro Cup
PA	Pro-Am Cup
	Guest Starter

== Results ==
Round		Circuit	Pole Position	Fastest Lap	Winning Driver	Winning Team	B-Class Winner
1		(China) Shanghai 1	(Austria) Martin Ragginger	(Germany) Philip Hamprecht	(New Zealand) Will Bamber	Team Porsche New Zealand	(Hong Kong) Francis Tjia
2	R1	(Japan) Suzuka	(Germany) Philip Hamprecht	(New Zealand) Will Bamber	(Germany) Philip Hamprecht	(Singapore) Team StarChase	(China) Bao Jinlong
2	R2	(Japan) Suzuka	(Germany) Philip Hamprecht	(Germany) Philip Hamprecht	(New Zealand) Chris van der Drift	(Hong Kong) Kamlung Racing	(Singapore) Yuey Tan
3	R1	(Japan) Fuji	(New Zealand) Will Bamber	(Austria) Martin Ragginger	(Austria) Martin Ragginger	(Germany) Team Porsche Holding	(Hong Kong) Francis Tjia
3	R2	(Japan) Fuji	(New Zealand) Will Bamber	(Germany) Philip Hamprecht	(New Zealand) Will Bamber	Team Porsche New Zealand	(China) Bao Jinlong
4	R1	(Malaysia) Sepang	(New Zealand) Will Bamber	(Germany) Philip Hamprecht	(Austria) Martin Ragginger	(Germany) Team Porsche Holding	(Indonesia) Michael Soeryadjaya
4	R2	(Malaysia) Sepang	(New Zealand) Will Bamber	(Austria) Martin Ragginger	(Austria) Martin Ragginger	(Germany) Team Porsche Holding	(Indonesia) Ahmad F. Alam
4	R3	(Malaysia) Sepang	(Germany) Philip Hamprecht	(New Zealand) Chris van der Drift	(Austria) Martin Ragginger	(Germany) Team Porsche Holding	(Singapore) Yuey Tan
5	R1	(Thailand) Bangsaen	(Germany) Philip Hamprecht	(Germany) Philip Hamprecht	(Germany) Philip Hamprecht	(Singapore) Team StarChase	(China) Bao Jinlong
5	R2	(Thailand) Bangsaen	(New Zealand) Will Bamber	(Austria) Martin Ragginger	(New Zealand) Will Bamber	Team Porsche New Zealand	(Hong Kong) Francis Tjia
6	R1	Singapore	(New Zealand) Will Bamber	(China) Daniel Lu Wenlong	(China) Daniel Lu Wenlong	Porsche China Junior Team	(Indonesia) Ahmad F. Alam
6	R2	Singapore	(Germany) Philip Hamprecht	(New Zealand) Will Bamber	(Germany) Philip Hamprecht	(Singapore) Team StarChase	(China) Bao Jinlong
7	R1	(China) Shanghai 2	(New Zealand) Will Bamber	(New Zealand) Will Bamber	(New Zealand) Will Bamber	Team Porsche New Zealand	(China) Bao Jinlong
7	R2	(China) Shanghai 2	(New Zealand) Will Bamber	(Austria) Martin Ragginger	(Austria) Martin Ragginger	(Germany) Team Porsche Holding	(China) Bao Jinlong

== Championship standings ==
=== Scoring system ===
Points were awarded to the top fifteen classified drivers in every race, using the following system:

Position	1st	2nd	3rd	4th	5th	6th	7th	8th	9th	10th	11th	12th	13th	14th	15th	Pole	FL
Points	20	18	16	14	12	10	9	8	7	6	5	4	3	2	1	1	1

=== Overall ===
Pos.	Driver	SHA1 (China)	SUZ (Japan)		FUJ (Japan)		SEP (Malaysia)			BNG (Thailand)		SIN (Singapore)		SHA2 (China)		Points
Pos.	Driver	R1	R2	R3	R4	R5	R6	R7	R8	R9	R10	R11	R12	R13	R14	Points
1	(Germany) Philip Hamprecht	3	1	7	4	7	2	3	3	1	4	3	1	3	9	220
2	(Austria) Martin Ragginger	2	Ret	9	1	2	1	1	1	DSQ	3	2	Ret	2	1	202
3	(New Zealand) Will Bamber	1	6	11	3	1	Ret	2	6	3	1	DNS	5	1	2	193
4	(China) Daniel Lu Wenlong	6	5	5	7	4	4	Ret	5	5	7	1	2	8	8	166
5	(China) Cui Yue	5	11	10	8	9	3	4	4	7	6	4	4	4	3	166
6	(Thailand) Tanart Sathienthirakul	7	4	12	5	5	Ret	6	8	4	5	5	3	6	4	149
7	(New Zealand) Chris van der Drift	4	2	1	2	3	Ret	DSQ	2							105
8	(China) Bao Jinlong	10	9	3	10	10				8	9	7	6	9	5	99
9	(Indonesia) Ahmad F. Alam	11	12	21	12	12	7	7	Ret	13	13	6	9	12	6	77
10	(Hong Kong) Francis Tjia	8	10	16	9	Ret	14	15	17	10	8	17	7	10	10	65
11	(Singapore) Yuey Tan	9	13	2	15	11	9	10	9	16	18	14	Ret	Ret	22	58
12	(Hong Kong) Antares Au	14	14	22	Ret	14	8	12	10	12	11	11	Ret	11	7	57
13	(Denmark) Benny Simonsen	12	7	Ret	17	6	5	5	7							56
14	(China) Li Chao	17	15	6	11	13				11	10	12	8	Ret	18	45
15	(Thailand) Suttiluck Buncharoen	13	16	13	13	20	11	11	11	9	12	Ret	11	21	17	44
16	(Indonesia) Michael Soeryadjaya		20	15			6	8	12			9	10	17	15	41
17	(Hong Kong) Eric Kwong	15	18	14	16	15	15	13	Ret	14	14	8	12	14	11	37
18	(Japan) Tsubasa Kondo		3	8												24
19	(China) Yuan Bo	Ret	8	4												22
20	(Hong Kong) John Shen	19	19	17	Ret	17	13	Ret	14	17	16	10	15	16	12	21
21	(Thailand) Kantadhee Kusiri				6	8										19
22	(Canada) Christian Chia	18			14	16				15	15	Ret	14	15	16	15
23	(Chinese Taipei) Peter Yang Liao	22	17	18	Ret	DNS	10	14	13			18	18			14
24	(Indonesia) Andrew Haryanto						Ret	9	Ret							7
25	(Malaysia) Adrian Henry D'Silva	16	22	19	19	21	12	Ret	Ret					18	19	5
26	(Australia) Paul Tresidder	Ret	21	20	20	18	Ret	Ret	16	18	Ret	13	16	20	21	3
27	(New Zealand) Graeme Dowsett						17	Ret	15			15	Ret			2
-	(Hong Kong) Marcel Tjia	21					16	16	18	20	Ret	16	Ret	19	20	0
-	(Hong Kong) Siu Yuk Lung				18	19										0
-	(Indonesia) Anderson Tanoto						Ret	17	DNS							0
-	(China) Hong Shijie	20														0
-	(Malaysia) Timothy Yeo						Ret	Ret	Ret							0
-	(Chinese Taipei) Jeffrey Chiang				Ret	DNS										0
Guest drivers ineligible for points
-	(France) Maxime Jousse									2	2			13	Ret	0
-	(New Zealand) Reid Harker									6	Ret			5	14	0
-	(United States) Riley Dickinson													7	13	0
-	(Hong Kong) Mak Hing Tak											19	17			0
-	(Singapore) Keong Wee Lim									19	17					0
-	(Malaysia) Douglas Khoo											20	18			0
Pos.	Driver	R1	R2	R3	R4	R5	R6	R7	R8	R9	R10	R11	R12	R13	R14	Points
Pos.	Driver	SHA1 (China)	SUZ (Japan)		FUJ (Japan)		SEP (Malaysia)			BNG (Thailand)		SIN (Singapore)		SHA2 (China)		Points

== See also ==
- 2019 Porsche Supercup
- 2019 Porsche Carrera Cup Australia
- 2019 Porsche Carrera Cup Great Britain
