= Antares Au =

Hong Kong racing driver (born 1979)

Antares Au 區天駿
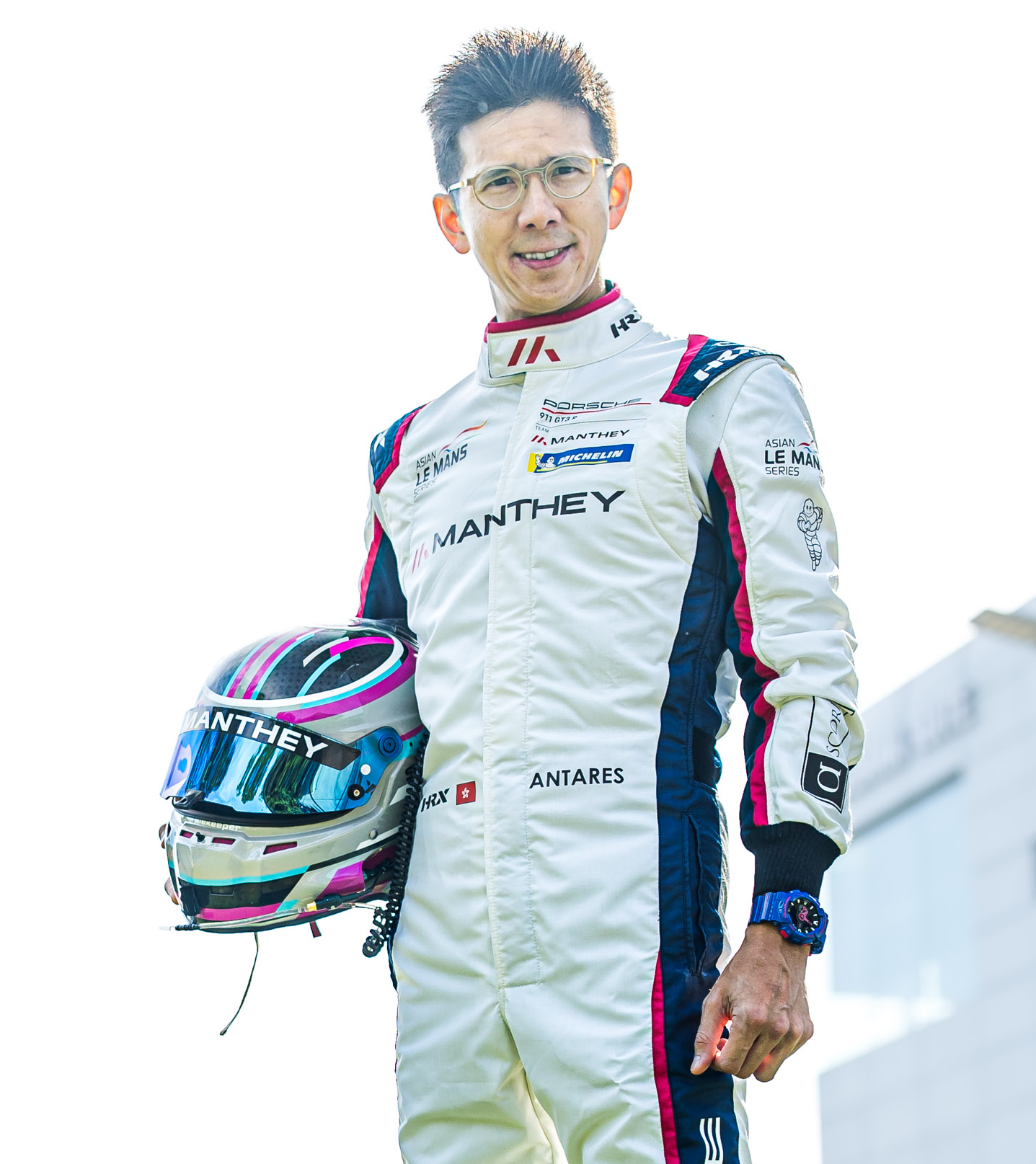
- Au in 2024
- Nationality: Hong Kong
- Born: 24 March 1979 (age 47) British Hong Kong

FIA World Endurance Championship career
- Debut season: 2026
- Current team: Garage 59
- Categorisation: FIA Bronze
- Car number: 10
- Starts: 8
- Wins: 1
- Podiums: 2
- Poles: 0
- Fastest laps: 0
- Best finish: 12th in 2026

Championship titles
- 2024–25 2024: Asian Le Mans Series – GT; Intercontinental GT Challenge – Independent Cup

Antares Au (Chinese: 區天駿; Jyutping: Au1 Tin1 Zeon3; born 24 March 1979) is a Hong Kong racing driver and business executive who last competed in the FIA World Endurance Championship for Garage 59. He is the 2024–25 Asian Le Mans Series GT champion and the 2024 Intercontinental GT Challenge Independent Cup champion.

== Business career ==
Au is a graduate of Columbia University and a financial investor by training. He is a founding member of Ares SSG Capital Management, a pan-Asian private credit investor and subsidiary of Los Angeles-based alternative asset manager Ares Management, and headed its investment activities in Greater China since its establishment in 2009. He retired from finance in 2023 to pursue endurance racing full-time.

== Racing career ==
=== Porsche Carrera Cup beginnings and early GT3 success (2017–2022) ===
Au began his racing career in Porsche Carrera Cup Asia in 2017. His debut in GT3 competition came in 2019, when he finished fourth in-class at the Dubai 24 Hours with Hong Kong drivers Frank Yu, Jonathan Hui and Kevin Tse.

Au's first successes in GT3 came in 2021, when he won the inaugural 6 Hours of Abu Dhabi with co-driver Chris Froggatt. Au also made his full-season debut in the GT class of Asian Le Mans, racing for Herberth Motorsport alongside Porsche factory driver Klaus Bachler. He then also raced for Herberth that same year at the 24 Hours of Spa with co-drivers Robert Renauer and Alfred Renauer.

In 2022, Au returned to Asian Le Mans and Herberth Motorsport, teaming up with Bachler for the second year running and with the addition of Ye Yifei. The trio finished second in the season finale at Yas Marina Circuit. Au also returned to the 24 Hours of Spa, joining Jaxon Evans, Dylan Pereira and Kevin Tse at Herberth Motorsport.

=== Notable wins in major endurance races and first major title (2023–2025) ===
Au began to achieve more prominent results in 2023, when he won the Spa round of the International GT Open championship co-driving with Matteo Cairoli in Pro-Am class. Au returned to the top step of the podium at the 2023 24 Hours of Spa, when he started from overall pole position and won the Bronze class with Cairoli, Tim Heinemann and Jannes Fittje, becoming the first driver from Hong Kong to win this historic race. Later the same year, Au debuted at the 2023 Indianapolis 8 Hours with Porsche factory driver Laurin Heinrich and Alfred Renauer from pole position and finished second in Pro-Am class. In the last race of 2023, he finished third in-class at the Gulf 12 Hours with Cairoli and Heinemann.

In 2024, Au debuted at the 24 Hours of Nürburgring with Lionspeed GP, winning the SP9 Pro-Am class with Patric Niederhauser, Indy Dontje and Patrick Kolb, becoming the first driver from Hong Kong to win the SP9 Pro-Am category at Nurburgring 24H. Later in the Intercontinental GT Challenge series, Au returned to the Indianapolis 8 Hour with Niederhauser and Loek Hartog, starting from overall pole position and winning the Pro-Am class, securing the IGTC Independent Cup Championship title for 2024. In December, Au returned to the Asian Le Mans Series, joining Manthey Racing alongside Joel Sturm and Klaus Bachler. In the first round at Sepang, the trio retired in race one but rebounded in race two to take their first podium by finishing second. In early 2025, the team ran into troubles in the Dubai double-header, but saw their fortunes turn around at Yas Marina, scoring second in race one and winning the final race, thus crowning Au and his co-drivers 2024–2025 season champions and earning them an invite to the 2025 24 Hours of Le Mans, where he finished sixth on debut.

=== Full-time campaign in Europe and WEC rookie season (2025–present) ===
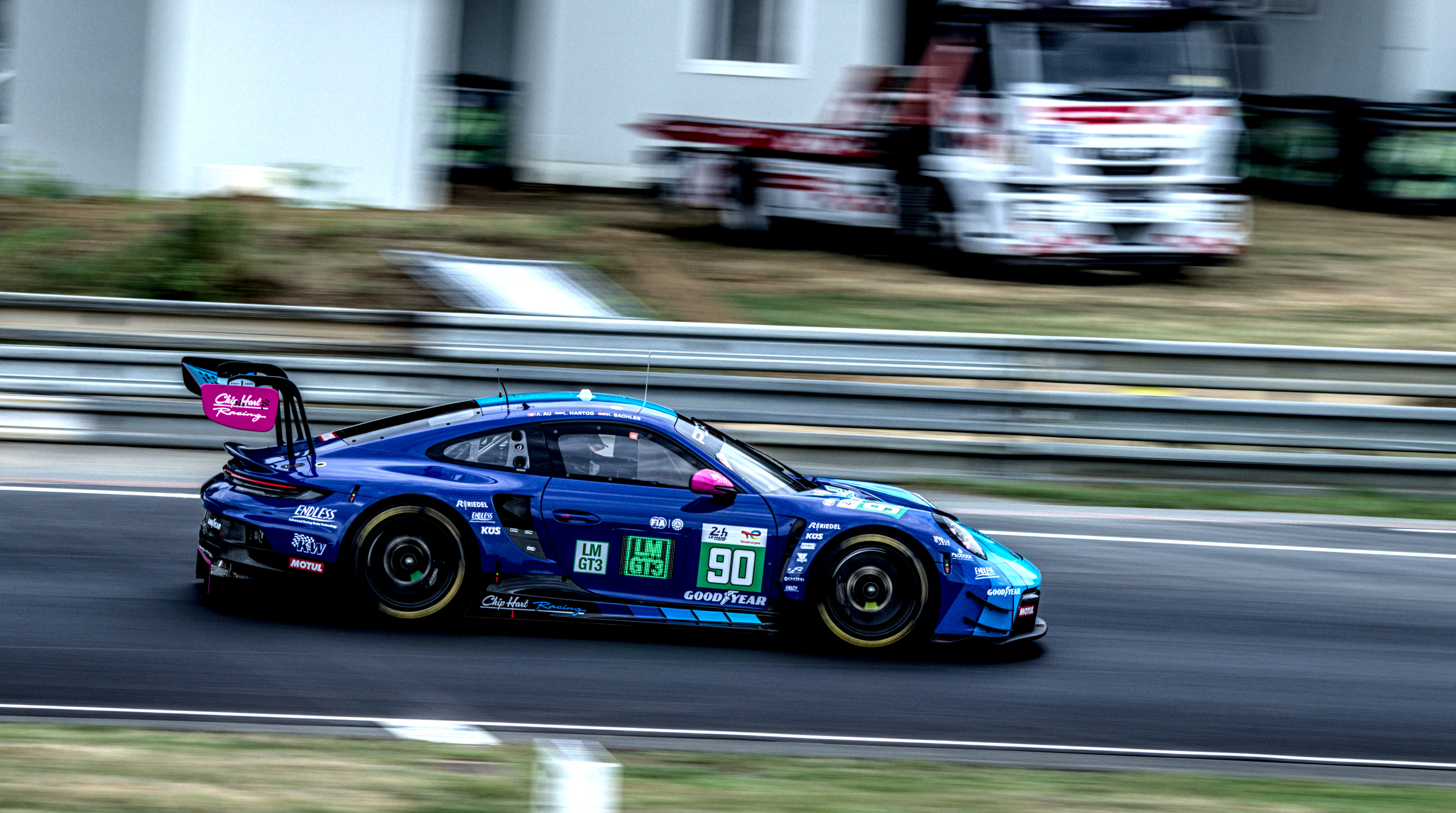
Au drove for Manthey Racing at the 2025 24 Hours of Le Mans alongside Klaus Bachler and Loek Hartog, finishing sixth in his maiden appearance at the event.

For the rest of 2025, Au joined Rutronik Racing to race in GT World Challenge Europe Endurance Cup, in which he scored Bronze class wins at Monza and Barcelona alongside Loek Hartog to secure runner-up honors in class. In Asia, Au won the Suzuka 1000km with Richard Lietz and Hartog in the Bronze class, finishing fourth overall, three tenths off the overall podium. Elsewhere, Au finished second in-class at the 24 Hours of Dubai and the Indianapolis 8 Hour. At the end of the year, Au returned to Manthey Racing to compete in the 2025–26 Asian Le Mans Series, taking all but two podiums and a best result of second twice to secure a third-place points finish. Au also raced in the 2025–26 24H Series Middle East during this, scoring an overall win at the 6 Hours of Abu Dhabi, as well as a GT3 Pro-Am win at the Dubai 24 Hour en route to runner-up honors in GT3.

For the rest of 2026, Au joined Garage 59 to make his debut in the LMGT3 class of the FIA World Endurance Championship alongside Marvin Kirchhöfer and Tom Fleming. In his first WEC season, Au won the 6 Hours of Spa-Francorchamps and finished second at the 6 Hours of Barcelona to end the year 12th in LMGT3 points. In parallel, Au returned to Rutronik Racing for his second full-time season in the GT World Challenge Europe Endurance Cup, in which he took a lone Bronze class win at Le Castellet.

== Racing record ==
=== Racing career summary ===
Season	Series	Team	Races	Wins	Poles	F/Laps	Podiums	Points	Position
2017	24H Series – SP3-GT4	GDL Racing Team Asia	1	0	0	0	1	26	**3rd**
2017	Porsche Carrera Cup Asia	Modena Motorsports	2	0	0	0	0	13	8th
2018	24H GT Series – GT4	BLACK FALCON Team TMD Friction	1	0	0	0	1	26	**3rd**
2018	Porsche Carrera Cup Asia	Modena Motorsports	16	0	0	0	0	43	16th
2019	Dubai 24 Hour – A6 Am	Team Porsche Centre Hong Kong	1	0	0	0	0	—N/a	4th
2019	Porsche Carrera Cup Asia	Earl Bamber Motorsport	14	0	0	0	0	57	12th
2019	Blancpain GT Series Endurance Cup – Am	OpenRoad Racing	1	0	0	0	0	8	26th
2020	24H GT Series – GT3 Am	Team Hong Kong Craft-Bamboo Racing	1	0	0	0	0	18	7th
2021	6 Hours of Abu Dhabi – GT	Car Collection Motorsport	1	1	0	0	1	—N/a	**1st**
2021	Asian Le Mans Series – GT	Precote Herberth Motorsport	4	0	1	0	0	4.5	15th
2021	GT World Challenge Europe Endurance Cup – Pro-Am	Precote Herberth Motorsport	1	0	0	0	0	6	35th
2021	Dubai 24 Hour – GT3 Am	Herberth Motorsport	1	0	0	0	0	—N/a	6th
2022	Asian Le Mans Series – GT	Herberth Motorsport	4	0	1	0	1	20	8th
2022	GT World Challenge Europe Endurance Cup – Pro-Am	Herberth Motorsport	1	0	0	0	0	1	15th
2022	British GT Championship – GT4	Allied Racing by Herberth	1	0	0	0	0	0	NC†
2023	Gulf 12 Hours – Pro-Am	Herberth Motorsport	1	0	0	0	1	—N/a	**3rd**
2023	Asian Le Mans Series – GT	Herberth Motorsport	4	0	0	0	0	4	16th
2023	Intercontinental GT Challenge	Herberth Motorsport; Huber Motorsport	2	0	1	0	0	18	19th
2023	GT World Challenge Europe Endurance Cup – Bronze	Huber Motorsport	1	1	1	1	1	36	9th
2023	International GT Open – Pro-Am	Huber Motorsport	1	1	0	0	1	20	10th
2023	GT World Challenge America – Pro-Am	Huber Motorsport	1	0	1	0	1	0	NC†
2023	GT World Challenge Asia – GT3 Am	Modena Motorsports	2	2	0	0	2	0	NC†
2023–24	Asian Le Mans Series – GT	Herberth Motorsport	5	0	0	0	0	19	15th
2023–24	Middle East Trophy – GT3	Herberth Motorsport	1	0	0	0	0	24	7th
2024	24 Hours of Nürburgring – SP9 Pro-Am	Lionspeed GP	1	1	0	0	1	—N/a	**1st**
2024	Intercontinental GT Challenge – Independent Cup	Huber Motorsport; Lionspeed GP; Lionspeed x Herberth	3	3	1	0	3	75	**1st**
2024	GT World Challenge Europe Endurance Cup – Bronze	Lionspeed x Herberth	1	0	0	0	0	10	29th
2024	International GT Open – Pro-Am	Lionspeed x Herberth	1	0	0	0	0	0	39th
2024	24H Series – GT3 Am	Car Collection Motorsport	1	0	0	0	1	32	16th
2024	GT World Challenge America – Pro-Am	Herberth Motorsport	1	1	1	0	1	0	NC†
2024	GT World Challenge Asia – Am	Audi Sport Asia Team Absolute	2	0	0	0	2	30	12th
2024–25	Asian Le Mans Series – GT	Manthey Racing	6	1	0	0	3	86	**1st**
2025	Middle East Trophy – GT3	Herberth Motorsport	2	0	0	0	1	30	**3rd**
2025	GT World Challenge Europe Endurance Cup – Bronze	Rutronik Racing	5	2	0	0	2	66	**2nd**
2025	Intercontinental GT Challenge – Independent Cup	Rutronik Racing; Absolute Racing; Wright Motorsports	3	1	0	0	3	61	**2nd**
2025	European Le Mans Series – LMGT3	Proton Competition	1	0	0	0	0	0	20th
2025	24 Hours of Le Mans – LMGT3	Manthey	1	0	0	0	0	—N/a	6th
2025–26	Asian Le Mans Series – GT	Manthey Racing	6	0	0	1	4	70	**3rd**
2025–26	24H Series Middle East – GT3	Absolute Racing	1	0	0	0	1	76	**2nd**
2025–26	24H Series Middle East – GT3	Herberth Motorsport	2	1	0	0	1	76	**2nd**
2026	FIA World Endurance Championship – LMGT3	Garage 59	8	1	0	0	2	57	12th
2026	GT World Challenge Europe Endurance Cup – Bronze	Rutronik Racing	4	1	0	2	2	50	6th
2026	Intercontinental GT Challenge	Rutronik Racing	1	0	0	0	0	0	NC

† As Au was a guest driver, he was ineligible to score points.

=== Complete Blancpain GT Series Endurance Cup / GT World Challenge Europe Endurance Cup results ===
(Races in bold indicate pole position) (Races in italics indicate fastest lap)

Year	Team	Car	Class	1	2	3	4	5	6	7	Pos.	Points
2019	OpenRoad Racing	Porsche 911 GT3 R	Am	MNZ	SIL	LEC	SPA; 6H; 59	SPA; 12H; 53	SPA; 24H; 45	CAT	26th	8
2021	Precote Herberth Motorsport	Porsche 911 GT3 R	Pro-Am	MNZ	LEC	SPA; 6H; 49	SPA; 12H; 36	SPA; 24H; 26	NÜR	CAT	35th	6
2022	Herberth Motorsport	Porsche 911 GT3 R	Pro-Am	IMO	LEC	SPA; 6H; 61	SPA; 12H; 61†	SPA; 24H; Ret	HOC	CAT	15th	6
2023	Huber Motorsport	Porsche 911 GT3 R (992)	Bronze	MNZ	LEC	SPA; 6H; 27	SPA; 12H; 27	**SPA**; **24H**; 13	NÜR	CAT	9th	36
2024	Lionspeed x Herberth	Porsche 911 GT3 R (992)	Bronze	LEC	SPA; 6H; 41	SPA; 12H; 28	SPA; 24H; 22	NÜR	MNZ	JED	29th	10
2025	Rutronik Racing	Porsche 911 GT3 R (992)	Bronze	LEC; 39	MNZ; 10	SPA; 6H; 66	SPA; 12H; 57	SPA; 24H; 45	NÜR; 35	CAT; 12	2nd	66
2026	Rutronik Racing	Porsche 911 GT3 R (992.2)	Bronze	LEC; 13	MNZ; 38†	SPA; 6H; 29	SPA; 12H; 25	SPA; 24H; 43	NÜR; Ret	ALG	6th	50

=== Complete Asian Le Mans Series results ===
(key) (Races in bold indicate pole position) (Races in italics indicate fastest lap)

Year	Team	Class	Car	Engine	1	2	3	4	5	6	Pos.	Points
2021	Precote Herberth Motorsport	GT	Porsche 911 GT3 R	Porsche 4.0 L Flat-6	DUB; 1; 15	**DUB**; **2**; 9	ABU; 1; 12	ABU; 2; 13			15th	4.5
2022	Herberth Motorsport	GT	Porsche 911 GT3 R	Porsche 4.0 L Flat-6	DUB; 1; 12	DUB; 2 Ret	ABU; 1; 17	**ABU**; **2**; 2			8th	20
2023	Herberth Motorsport	GT	Porsche 911 GT3 R	Porsche 4.0 L Flat-6	DUB; 1 Ret	DUB; 2; 11	ABU; 1; 8	ABU; 2; 12			16th	4
2023–24	Herberth Motorsport	GT	Porsche 911 GT3 R (992)	Porsche 4.2 L Flat-6	SEP; 1 Ret	SEP; 2; 7	DUB; 9	ABU; 1; 5	ABU; 2; 10		15th	19
2024–25	Manthey Racing	GT	Porsche 911 GT3 R (992)	Porsche 4.2 L Flat-6	SEP; 1 Ret	SEP; 2; 2	DUB; 1; 5	DUB; 2; 4	ABU; 1; 2	ABU; 2; 1	1st	86
2025–26	Manthey Racing	GT	Porsche 911 GT3 R (992)	Porsche 4.2 L Flat-6	SEP; 1; 2	SEP; 2 Ret	DUB; 1; 2	DUB; 2; 3	ABU; 1; 9	ABU; 2; 3	3rd	70

=== Complete International GT Open results ===
Year	Team	Car	Class	1	2	3	4	5	6	7	8	9	10	11	12	13	14	Pos.	Points
2023	Huber Motorsport	Porsche 911 GT3 R (992)	Pro-Am	ALG; 1	ALG; 2	SPA; 4	HUN; 1	HUN; 2	LEC; 1	LEC; 2	RBR; 1	RBR; 2	MNZ; 1	MNZ; 2	CAT; 1	CAT; 2		10th	25
2024	Lionspeed GP x Herberth	Porsche 911 GT3 R (992)	Pro-Am	ALG; 1	ALG; 2	HOC; 1	HOC; 2	SPA; Ret	HUN; 1	HUN; 2	LEC; 1	LEC; 2	RBR; 1	RBR; 2	CAT; 1	CAT; 2	MNZ	39th	0

=== Complete GT World Challenge Asia results ===
(key) (Races in bold indicate pole position) (Races in italics indicate fastest lap)

Year	Team	Car	Class	1	2	3	4	5	6	7	8	9	10	11	12	Pos.	Points
2023	Modena Motorsports	Porsche 911 GT3 R (992)	Am	BUR; 1	BUR; 2	FSW; 1	FSW; 2	SUZ; 1	SUZ; 2	MOT; 1	MOT; 2	OKA; 1	OKA; 2	SEP; 1; 1	SEP; 2; 1	NC†	0†
2024	FAW Audi Sport Asia Racing Team	Audi R8 LMS Evo II	Am	SEP; 1	SEP; 2	BUR; 1	BUR; 2	FSW; 1	FSW; 2	SUZ; 1	SUZ; 2	OKA; 1	OKA; 2	SIC; 1; 3	SIC; 2; 3	12th	30

^{†} As Au was a guest driver, he was ineligible to score points.

=== 24 Hours of Le Mans results ===
Year	Team	Co-Drivers	Car	Class	Laps	Pos.	Class Pos.
2025	(Germany) Manthey	(Austria) Klaus Bachler (Netherlands) Loek Hartog	Porsche 911 GT3 R (992)	LMGT3	340	38th	6th
2026	(United Kingdom) Garage 59	(United Kingdom) Tom Fleming (Germany) Marvin Kirchhöfer	McLaren 720S GT3 Evo	LMGT3	332	44th	12th

=== Complete FIA World Endurance Championship results ===
(key) (Races in bold indicate pole position; races in italics indicate fastest lap)

Year	Entrant	Class	Car	Engine	1	2	3	4	5	6	7	8	Rank	Points
2026	Garage 59	LMGT3	McLaren 720S GT3 Evo	McLaren M840T 4.0 L Turbo V8	**IMO**; 13	SPA; 1	LMS; 8	SÃO; 16	COA; 17	FUJ; 8	**CAT**; 2	MNZ; 13	12th	57

^{*} Season still in progress.
