= Will Bamber =

New Zealand racing driver (born 1993)

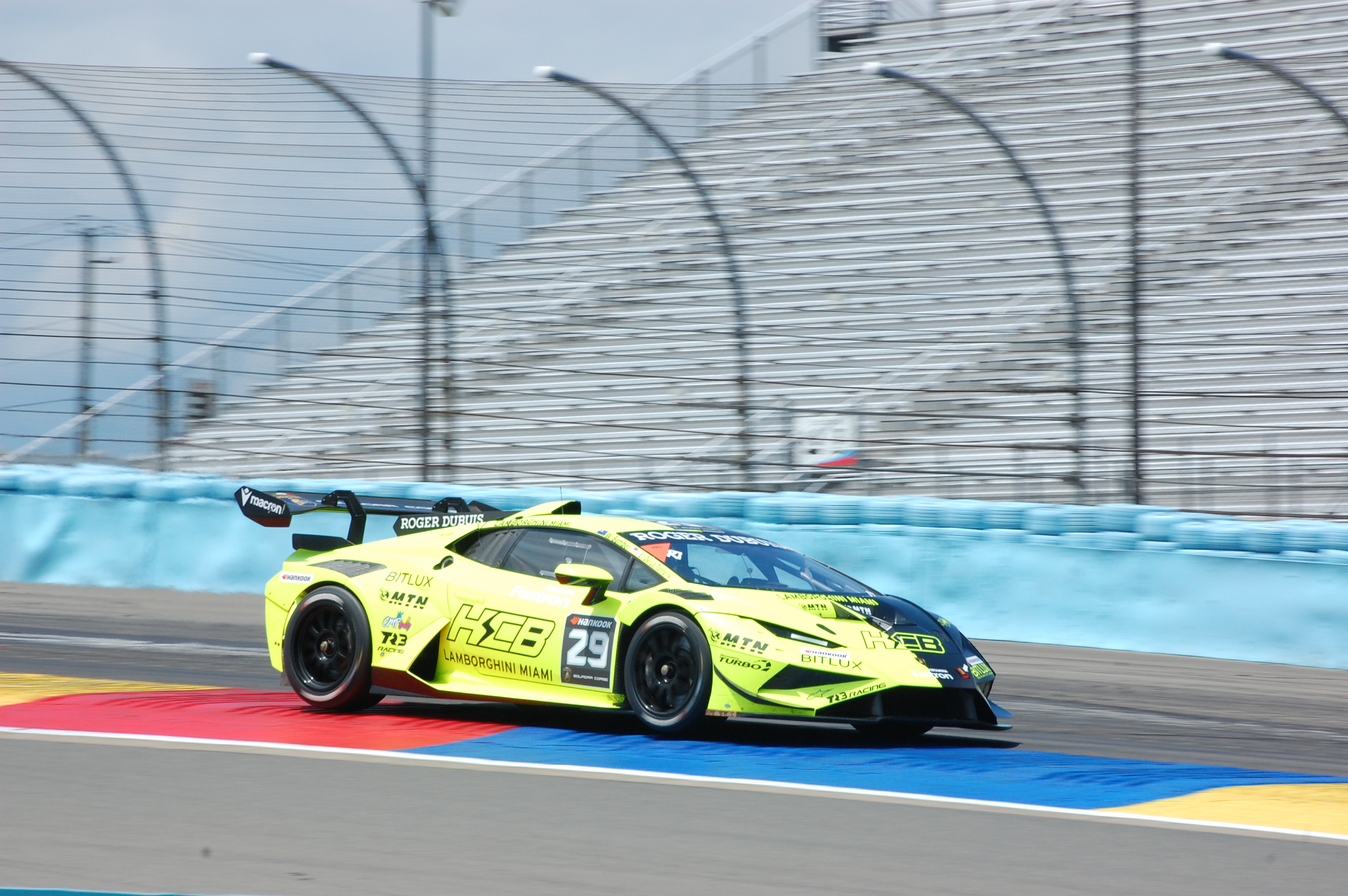
- Bamber in 2025
- Nationality: (New Zealand) New Zealander
- Born: 29 November 1993 (age 32) Whanganui, New Zealand
- Relatives: Earl Bamber (brother)
- Categorisation: FIA Silver

Championship titles
- 2017–18 2009–10: Asian Le Mans Series – GT Cup; Suzuki Swift Sport Cup Championship New Zealand

William Bamber (born 29 November 1993) is a New Zealand racing driver who last competed for XONINE Racing in Lamborghini Super Trofeo North America. He is the brother of Earl Bamber.

== Career ==
Bamber began his racing career in late 2008, competing in the Suzuki Swift Sport Cup Championship New Zealand and finishing runner-up in the 2008–09 standings to Cody McMaster. Returning to the series the following year, Bamber took nine wins and four other podiums to secure the series title 170 points ahead of Ben Dallas. Moving to BNT NZV8s for the 2010–11 season, Bamber raced for LG Motorsport until the final two rounds, as he was prematurely let go by the team for "unresolved contractual issues".

In 2012, Bamber only competed in the first two Endurance rounds of the V8 SuperTourer season for John McIntyre Racing and Eddie Bell Racing. Following that, Bamber sat out 2013 before racing on a part-time basis across the following three seasons, most notably finishing second in the GTC Pro-Am class of the 2015 Sepang 12 Hours. In 2017, Bamber made his return to full-time racing, competing for FAW T2 Motorsport in Porsche Carrera Cup Asia. After taking his first win at Shanghai, Bamber won both races at Bangsaen and race two at Sepang to take third in points. In parallel, Bamber also drove for JRM JiaRui - TengDa in the China GT Championship, finishing runner-up in the GTC standings.

In early 2018, Bamber competed in the last two rounds of the 2017–18 Asian Le Mans Series for Team NZ, securing the GT Cup title by default after winning both races as the class' sole entrant. In 2018, Bamber entered the Thailand Super Series for Porsche-fielding B-Quick Racing in the GTC class, securing the title with a win at the finale at Buriram. During 2018, Bamber joined newly created Earl Bamber Motorport for his second season in Porsche Carrera Cup Asia. In the seven-round season, Bamber took a lone win at Sepang and six other podiums to end the year fourth overall. Switching to Team Giltrap Group for his third season in Carrera Cup Asia, Bamber scored four wins and four other podiums to secure a third-place points finish. In parallel, Bamber also competed for D2 for the majority of the China GT Championship, finishing runner-up in the GT4 standings with two wins to his name. Towards the end of the year, Bamber made his FIA World Endurance Championship debut at the 2019 4 Hours of Shanghai for Dempsey-Proton Racing in LMGTE Am.

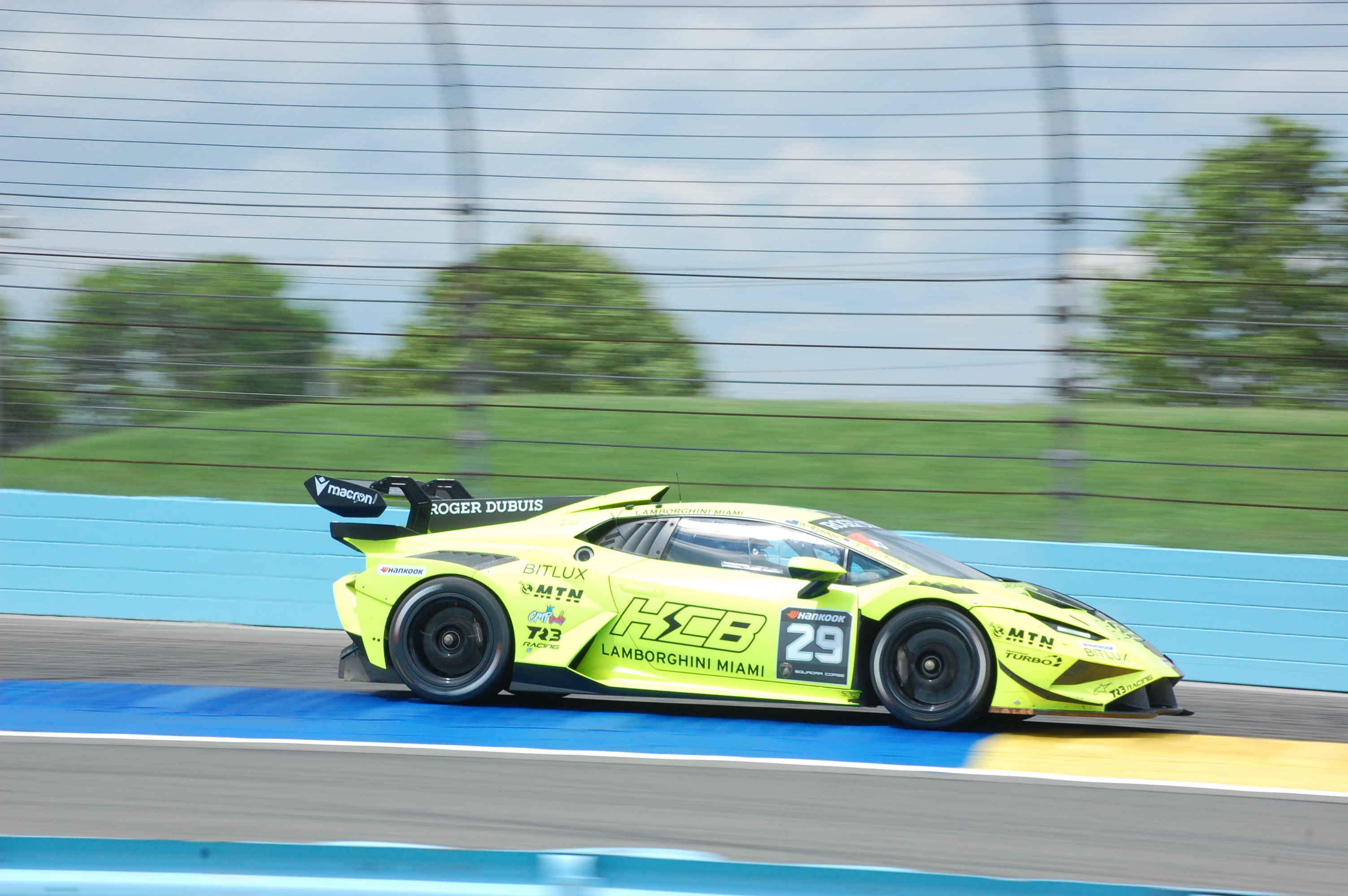
Bamber's TR3 Lamborghini Super Trofeo at Watkins Glen in 2025.

At the beginning of the following year, Bamber competed for his brother's team at the Dubai 24 Hour, finishing sixth in the GT3 Am class on his GT3 debut in endurance racing. Following that, Bamber was set to race for the team in GT World Challenge Asia, but the plans fell through when the season was cancelled due to COVID-19. In 2021, Bamber made a one-off return to racing, competing for EBM at the 24 Hours of Spa in the Pro-Am class.

Four years later, Bamber joined TR3 Racing for his full-time return to racing, competing in Lamborghini Super Trofeo North America alongside Elias De La Torre. Racing in the Pro class, Bamber won both Watkins Glen races to finish runner-up in points, before ending the year by finishing second at the World Finals with the same team. In 2026, Bamber remained with TR3 for a second season in Super Trofeo North America, and joined them in their return to GT World Challenge America aboard their Mercedes-AMG GT3 Evo. After winning both Sebring races in the former, Bamber parted ways with the team and switched to XONINE Racing to see out the rest of the Super Trofeo North America season. With XONINE, Bamber won three races and took four additional podiums en route to runner-up honours in the Pro standings.

== Personal life ==
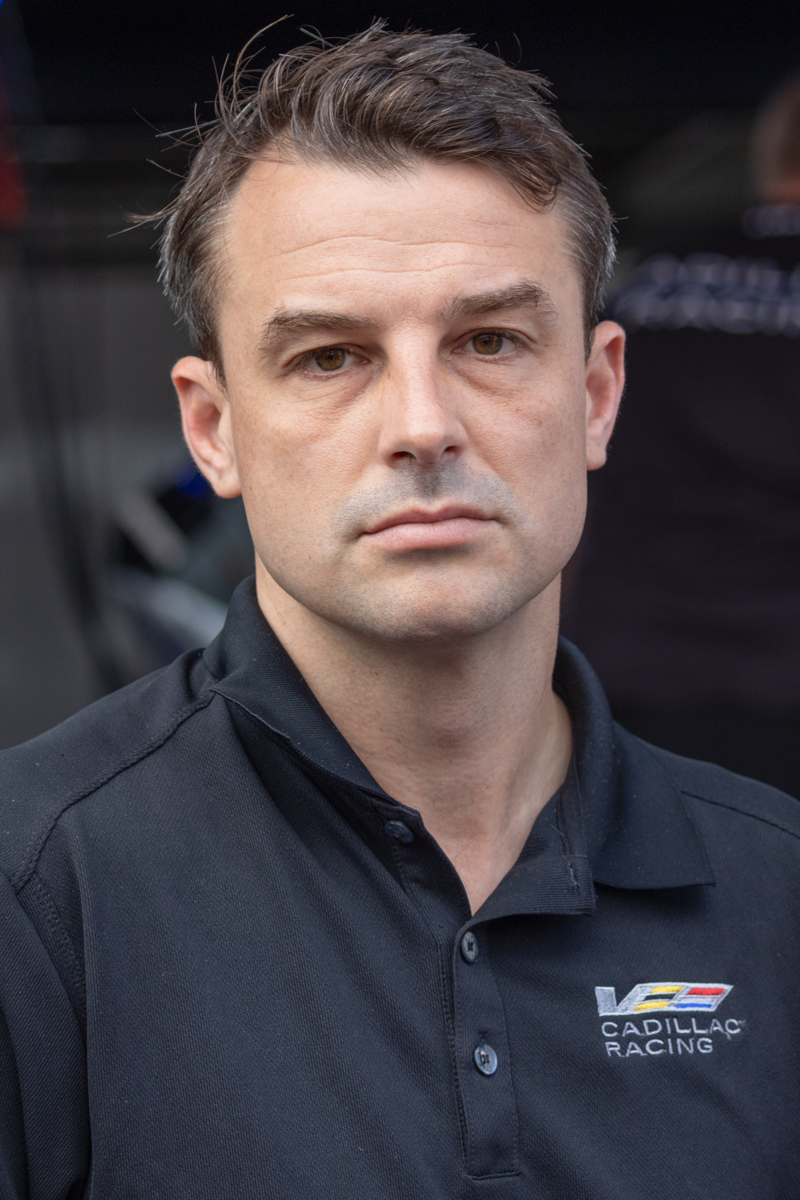
Bamber co-founded EBM with his brother, Earl Bamber (pictured), in 2018.

Bamber is the younger brother of 24 Hours of Le Mans winner Earl Bamber, with whom he co-founded Earl Bamber Motorsport (EBM) in 2018.

In August 2021, Bamber was arrested in Volusia County, Florida for domestic battery, prompting Hardpoint Motorsport to terminate its partnership with EBM. All charges were dropped in September, with the alleged victim – Bamber's girlfriend and ex-Hardpoint employee Sarah Serle – supporting Bamber, stating that "Will has never been an abuser". Bamber and Serle got married in Cabo San Lucas, Mexico in February 2023.

== Karting record ==
=== Karting career summary ===
| Season | Series | Team | Position |
|---|---|---|---|
| 2003 | Kartsport NZ National Sprint Championship — Cadet | | |
| 2003 | New Zealand National Schools Championship — Cadet | St Johns Hill School | |
| 2004 | Kartsport NZ National Sprint Championship — 100cc Junior Restricted | | 14th |
| 2006 | Blossom Sprint Meeting — Yamaha Junior | | 20th |
| 2007 | Trophy of New Zealand — Yamaha Junior | | 18th |
| 2007 | RMC New Zealand — Junior Max | | |
| 2007 | NZ Top Half Series — 100cc Yamaha Junior | | 15th |
| 2007 | NZ Top Half Series — Junior | | 13th |
| 2007 | RMC Grand Finals — Junior Max | | 31st |
| 2008 | Blossom Sprint Meeting — Yamaha Junior | | 4th |
| 2008 | RMC New Zealand — Junior Max | | |

== Racing record ==
=== Racing career summary ===
| Season | Series | Team | Races | Wins | Poles | F/Laps | Podiums | Points | Position |
|---|---|---|---|---|---|---|---|---|---|
| 2008–09 | Suzuki Swift Sport Cup Championship New Zealand | Suzuki Dealer Team | 21 | 4 | 2 | 5 | 13 | 1213 | **2nd** |
| 2009–10 | Suzuki Swift Sport Cup Championship New Zealand | LG | 18 | 9 | 3 | 3 | 13 | 1128 | **1st** |
| 2010 | Suzuki Swift Sport Cup Hamilton Street Challenge | | 3 | 1 | 0 | 1 | 3 | 209 | **2nd** |
| 2010–11 | NZV8s | International Motorsport | 15 | 0 | 0 | 0 | 0 | 317 | 18th |
| 2012 | V8SuperTourer – Endurance | John McIntyre Racing | 2 | 0 | 0 | 0 | 0 | 795‡ | 8th‡ |
| 2012 | V8SuperTourer – Endurance | Eddie Bell Racing | 0 | 0 | 0 | 0 | 0 | 336‡ | 19th‡ |
| 2014 | Malaysia Merdeka Endurance Race | Team NZ | 1 | 0 | 0 | 0 | 0 | —N/a | 8th |
| 2014 | Porsche Carrera Cup Asia | LKM Racing | 2 | 0 | 0 | 0 | 0 | 8 | 20th |
| 2015 | Sepang 12 Hours – GTC Pro-Am | Team NZ PTE LTD | 1 | 0 | 0 | 0 | 1 | —N/a | **2nd** |
| 2016 | Bathurst 12 Hour – B | Team NZ Motorsport | 0 | 0 | 0 | 0 | 0 | —N/a | WD |
| 2016 | Porsche Carrera Cup Asia | LKM Racing Team | 3 | 0 | 0 | 0 | 0 | 19 | 25th |
| 2016–17 | Asian Le Mans Series – GT Cup | Team NZ | 1 | 0 | 0 | 0 | 1 | 18 | 4th |
| 2017 | Porsche Carrera Cup Asia | FAW T2 Motorsport | 13 | 4 | 1 | 2 | 8 | 220 | **3rd** |
| 2017 | Porsche Carrera Cup Asia Invitational Race | FAW T2 Motorsport | 1 | 0 | 0 | 0 | 0 | —N/a | 5th |
| 2017 | China GT Championship – GTC | JRM JiaRui - TengDa | 10 | 4 | 0 | 4 | 6 | 162.5 | **2nd** |
| 2017–18 | Asian Le Mans Series – GT Cup | Team NZ | 2 | 2 | 2 | 0 | 2 | 52 | **1st** |
| 2018 | Porsche Carrera Cup Asia | Earl Bamber Motorsport | 13 | 1 | 0 | 3 | 7 | 163 | 4th |
| 2018 | GT Asia | B-Quik Racing Team | 2 | 0 | 0 | 0 | 1 | 0 | NC† |
| 2018–19 | Asian Le Mans Series – GT Cup | Earl Bamber Motorsport | 1 | 0 | 0 | 0 | 0 | 0 | 4th |
| 2019 | China GT Championship – GT4 | D2 | 8 | 2 | 0 | 0 | 7 | 176 | **2nd** |
| 2019 | Porsche Carrera Cup Asia | Team Giltrap Group | 13 | 4 | 6 | 1 | 8 | 193 | **3rd** |
| 2019 | China GT Championship – GT3 | D2 | 2 | 0 | 0 | 0 | 0 | 0 | 21st |
| 2019–20 | FIA World Endurance Championship – LMGTE Am | Dempsey-Proton Racing | 1 | 0 | 0 | 0 | 0 | 8 | 32nd |
| 2020 | 24H GT Series Continents – GT3-Am | Earl Bamber Motorsport | 1 | 0 | 0 | 0 | 0 | 15 | NC |
| 2021 | GT World Challenge Europe Endurance Cup – Pro-Am | EBM Giga Racing | 1 | 0 | 0 | 0 | 0 | 17 | 22nd |
| 2025 | Lamborghini Super Trofeo North America – Pro | TR3 Racing | 12 | 2 | 2 | 0 | 7 | 122 | **2nd** |
| 2025 | Lamborghini Super Trofeo World Finals – Pro | TR3 Racing | 2 | 1 | 0 | 1 | 1 | 19 | **2nd** |
| 2026 | Lamborghini Super Trofeo North America – Pro | TR3 Racing | 2 | 2 | 2 | 1 | 2 | 124 | **2nd** |
| 2026 | Lamborghini Super Trofeo North America – Pro | XONINE Racing | 10 | 3 | 2 | 1 | 7 | 124 | **2nd** |
| 2026 | Lamborghini Super Trofeo World Finals – Pro | XONINE Racing | 2 | 0 | 1 | 0 | 2 | 21 | **3rd** |
| 2026 | GT World Challenge America – Pro-Am | TR3 Racing | 1 | 0 | 0 | 0 | 0 | 0 | NC† |

* Season still in progress.

^{†} As Bamber was a guest driver, he was ineligible for points.

^{‡} Team standings.

=== Complete Asian Le Mans Series results ===
(key) (Races in bold indicate pole position) (Races in italics indicate fastest lap)

| Year | Team | Class | Car | Engine | 1 | 2 | 3 | 4 | Pos. | Points |
|---|---|---|---|---|---|---|---|---|---|---|
| 2016–17 | Team NZ | GTC | Porsche 991 GT3 Cup | Porsche 4.0 L Flat-6 | ZHU | FUJ | BUR | SEP; 2 | 4th | 18 |
| 2017–18 | Team NZ | GTC | Porsche 991 GT3 Cup | Porsche 4.0 L Flat-6 | ZHU | FUJ | **BUR**; 1 | **SEP**; 1 | 1st | 52 |
| 2018–19 | Earl Bamber Motorsport | GTC | Porsche 991 GT3 Cup | Porsche 4.0 L Flat-6 | SHA; Ret | FUJ | CHA | SEP | 4th | 0 |

=== Complete FIA World Endurance Championship results ===
(key) (Races in bold indicate pole position; races in italics indicate fastest lap)

| Year | Entrant | Class | Chassis | Engine | 1 | 2 | 3 | 4 | 5 | 6 | 7 | 8 | Rank | Points |
|---|---|---|---|---|---|---|---|---|---|---|---|---|---|---|
| 2019–20 | Dempsey-Proton Racing | LMGTE Am | Porsche 911 RSR | Porsche 4.0 L Flat-6 | SIL | FUJ | SHA; 6 | BHR | COA | SPA | LMS | BHR | 32nd | 8 |

=== Complete GT World Challenge Europe results ===
==== GT World Challenge Europe Endurance Cup ====
(Races in bold indicate pole position) (Races in italics indicate fastest lap)

| Year | Team | Car | Class | 1 | 2 | 3 | 4 | 5 | 6 | 7 | Pos. | Points |
|---|---|---|---|---|---|---|---|---|---|---|---|---|
| 2021 | EBM Giga Racing | Porsche 911 GT3 R | Pro-Am | MNZ | LEC | SPA; 6H; 32 | SPA; 12H; 31 | SPA; 24H; 20 | NÜR | CAT | 22nd | 17 |
