= Tanart Sathienthirakul =

Thai racing driver

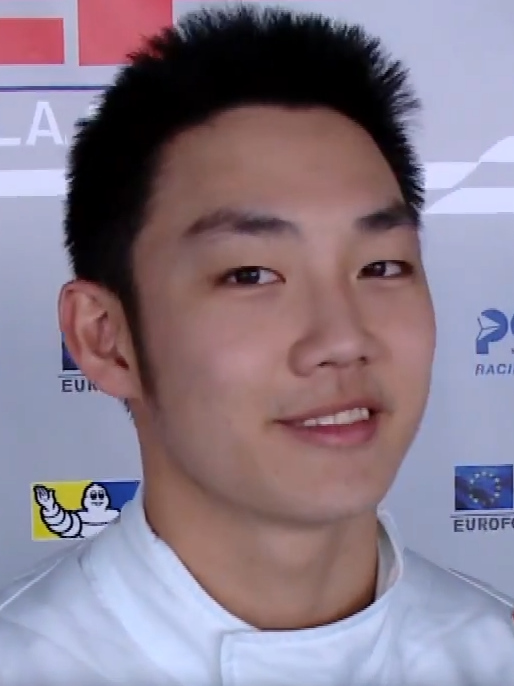
- Tanart in 2015
- Nationality: Thai
- Born: 29 November 1992 (age 33) Bangkok, Thailand
- Relatives: Munkong Sathienthirakul (brother)

Blancpain GT World Challenge Asia
- Categorisation: FIA Silver
- Years active: 2019
- Teams: Absolute Racing
- Starts: 4
- Wins: 1
- Poles: 0
- Fastest laps: 0

Previous series
- 2012–13 2012–13 2014–16 2015 2017–19 2019–23 2021–22 2022–23 2022: Toyota Racing Series; Formula Renault 2.0 NEC; Euroformula Open; FIA Formula 3 European Championship; Porsche Carrera Cup Asia; Blancpain GT World Challenge Asia; 24H TCE Series; GT World Challenge Europe Endurance Cup; Intercontinental GT Challenge

Tanart "Top" Sathienthirakul (Thai: ธนาตย์ เสถียรถิระกุล; born 29 November 1992) is a Thai racing driver who currently competes in the Asian Le Mans Series for Earl Bamber Motorsport. He previously raced in the GT World Challenge Europe Endurance Cup for Dinamic GT, and competed in the Euroformula Open Championship and Toyota Racing Series during his junior career.

== Racing record ==
=== Career summary ===
Season	Series	Team	Races	Wins	Poles	F/Laps	Podiums	Points	Position
2012	Toyota Racing Series	M2 Competition	15	0	0	0	0	383	14th
2012	Formula Renault 2.0 NEC	Manor MP Motorsport	20	0	0	0	0	60	27th
2012	Eurocup Formula Renault 2.0	Manor MP Motorsport	4	0	0	0	0	0	42nd
2013	Toyota Racing Series	ETEC Motorsport	15	0	0	0	0	462	11th
2013	Formula Renault 2.0 NEC	ART Junior Team	16	0	0	0	0	123	11th
2013	Formula Renault 2.0 Alps Series	ARTA Engineering	2	0	0	0	0	0	NC†
2013	Formula Masters China	Eurasia Motorsport	12	1	3	0	6	115	7th
2014	Euroformula Open Championship	Team West-Tec F3	16	0	0	0	0	67	7th
2014	GT Asia Series - GT3		2	0	0	0	0	18	31st
2015	Euroformula Open Championship	Motul Team West-Tec F3	16	0	0	0	3	133	4th
2015	FIA Formula 3 European Championship	Motopark	3	0	0	0	0	0	40th
2015-16	Asian Le Mans Series - LMP3	Team AAI	1	0	0	0	1	18	4th
2015-16	Asian Le Mans Series - GT	Bentley Team Absolute	1	0	0	0	0	4	23rd
2016	Euroformula Open Championship	RP Motorsport	16	0	0	0	0	80	7th
2016	Asian Le Mans Sprint Cup - LMP3	WinEurasia Motorsport	2	0	0	0	1	18	11th
2016	Renault Sport Trophy - Pro	Team Marc VDS EG 0,0	9	0	0	0	1	52	5th
2016	Renault Sport Trophy - Endurance	Team Marc VDS EG 0,0	6	1	1	0	3	63	5th
2017	Porsche Carrera Cup Asia	Absolute Racing	13	0	0	0	0	135	7th
2018	Porsche Carrera Cup Asia	Est Cola PTT	13	0	0	0	2	131	6th
2019	Porsche Carrera Cup Asia	Bunjong Motorsports	14	0	0	0	1	149	6th
2019	Blancpain GT World Challenge Asia	Absolute Racing	12	2	1	0	6	140	**3rd**
2021	24H TCE Series - TCR	BBR - Billionaire Boys Racing	1	1	0	0	1	0	NC†
2022	24H TCE Series - TCR	BBR - Billionaire Boys Racing							
2022	GT World Challenge Europe Endurance Cup	Singha Racing Team TP 12	2	0	0	0	0	0	NC
2022	Intercontinental GT Challenge	Singha Racing Team TP 12	1	0	0	0	0	N/A	NC
2022	GT World Challenge Asia - GT3	AAS Motorsport	8	0	1	0	1	68	7th
2022	24H GT Series - GT3	Earl Bamber Motorsport							
2023	GT World Challenge Europe Endurance Cup	Dinamic GT Huber Racing	3	0	0	0	0	0	NC
2023	GT World Challenge Europe Endurance Cup	Dinamic GT with Car Collection	2	0	0	0	0	0	NC
2023	GT World Challenge Asia - GT3	EBM Giga Racing	2	0	0	0	0	0	NC†
2023-24	Asian Le Mans Series - GT	Earl Bamber Motorsport	5	0	0	0	0	0	29th
2024	GT World Challenge Europe Endurance Cup	Winward Racing	4	0	0	0	0	2	30th
2024	GT World Challenge Asia	Absolute Racing	12	0	0	?	0	30	22nd
2024	Gulf 12 Hours	Kessel Racing	1	0	0	0	0	N/A	14th
2025	Middle East Trophy - GT3	Earl Bamber Motorsport							
2025	GT World Challenge Europe Endurance Cup	GetSpeed	5	0	0	0	0	0	NC
2025	Italian GT Championship Endurance Cup - GT3	Antonelli Motorsport	4	0	0	0	0	20	12th
2025-26	24H Series Middle East - GT3	Climax Racing	1	0	0	0	0	24	16th
2025-26	24H Series Middle East - GT3	EBM	1	0	0	0	0	24	16th
2026	GT World Challenge Europe Endurance Cup	Dinamic GT	5	0	0	0	0	1	32nd
2026	GT World Challenge Europe Sprint Cup	Dinamic GT	10	0	0	0	0	0	NC

*Season in progress

=== Complete Eurocup Formula Renault 2.0 results ===
(key) (Races in bold indicate pole position; races in italics indicate fastest lap)

Year	Entrant	1	2	3	4	5	6	7	8	9	10	11	12	13	14	DC	Points
2012	Manor MP Motorsport	ALC; 1	ALC; 2	SPA; 1	SPA; 2	NÜR; 1; 28	NÜR; 2; 19	MSC; 1	MSC; 2	HUN; 1; 26	HUN; 2; 28	LEC; 1	LEC; 2	CAT; 1	CAT; 2	42nd	0

=== Complete Formula Renault 2.0 NEC results ===
(key) (Races in bold indicate pole position) (Races in italics indicate fastest lap)

Year	Entrant	1	2	3	4	5	6	7	8	9	10	11	12	13	14	15	16	17	18	19	20	DC	Points
2012	Manor MP Motorsport	HOC; 1; 21	HOC; 2; 20	HOC; 3; 12	NÜR; 1; 24	NÜR; 2; 17	OSC; 1; 21	OSC; 2; 14	OSC; 3; 14	ASS; 1; 14	ASS; 2; 21	RBR; 1 Ret	RBR; 2; 24	MST; 1; 20	MST; 2; 12	MST; 3; 14	ZAN; 1; 14	ZAN; 2 Ret	ZAN; 3; 15	SPA; 1; 20	SPA; 2; 32	27th	60
2013	ART Junior Team	HOC; 1; 21	HOC; 2; 13	HOC; 3; 16	NÜR; 1; 15	NÜR; 2; 18	SIL; 1; 7	SIL; 2; 19	SPA; 1; 9	SPA; 2; 5	ASS; 1; 9	ASS; 2; 12	MST; 1 Ret	MST; 2; 10	MST; 3; 19	ZAN; 1; 11	ZAN; 2; 8	ZAN; 3 C				11th	123

=== Complete Euroformula Open Championship results ===
(key) (Races in bold indicate pole position) (Races in italics indicate fastest lap)

Year	Entrant	1	2	3	4	5	6	7	8	9	10	11	12	13	14	15	16	Pos	Points
2014	Team West-Tec F3	NÜR; 1; 5	NÜR; 2; 4	ALG; 1; 6	ALG; 2; 9	JER; 1; 9	JER; 2 Ret	HUN; 1; 11	HUN; 2; 14	SIL; 1; 10	SIL; 2; 7	SPA; 1; 5	SPA; 2 Ret	MNZ; 1; 10	MNZ; 2; 8	CAT; 1; 8	CAT; 2; 9	7th	69
2015	Motul Team West-Tec F3	JER; 1; 3	JER; 2; 8	LEC; 1; 5	LEC; 2; 8	EST; 1; 5	EST; 2; 3	SIL; 1; 8	SIL; 2; 6	RBR; 1; 3	RBR; 2; 6	SPA; 1; 5	SPA; 2; 4	MNZ; 1 Ret	MNZ; 2; 4	CAT; 1; 8	CAT; 2; 10	4th	133
2016	RP Motorsport	EST; 1; 5	EST; 2; 15	SPA; 1; 4	SPA; 2; 6	LEC; 1; 8	LEC; 2; 5	SIL; 1 Ret	SIL; 2; 12	RBR; 1; 5	RBR; 2; 6	MNZ; 1; 7	MNZ; 2; 9	JER; 1; 12	JER; 2; 10	CAT; 1; 13	CAT; 2; 9	7th	80

=== Complete FIA Formula 3 European Championship results ===
(key) (Races in bold indicate pole position; races in italics indicate fastest lap)

Year	Entrant	Engine	1	2	3	4	5	6	7	8	9	10	11	12	13	14	15	16	17	18	19	20	21	22	23	24	25	26	27	28	29	30	31	32	33	DC	Points
2015	Motopark	Volkswagen	SIL; 1	SIL; 2	SIL; 3	HOC; 1	HOC; 2	HOC; 3	PAU; 1	PAU; 2	PAU; 3	MNZ; 1	MNZ; 2	MNZ; 3	SPA; 1	SPA; 2	SPA; 3	NOR; 1	NOR; 2	NOR; 3	ZAN; 1	ZAN; 2	ZAN; 3	RBR; 1	RBR; 2	RBR; 3	ALG; 1	ALG; 2	ALG; 3	NÜR; 1	NÜR; 2	NÜR; 3	HOC; 1; 25	HOC; 2; 23	HOC; 3 Ret	40th	0

=== Complete GT World Challenge Europe results ===
==== GT World Challenge Europe Endurance Cup ====
(key) (Races in bold indicate pole position; results in italics indicate fastest lap)

Year	Team	Car	Class	1	2	3	4	5	6	7	Pos.	Points
2022	Singha Racing Team TP 12	Porsche 911 GT3 R	Gold	IMO	LEC; 33	SPA; 6H; 45	SPA; 12H; 37	SPA; 24H; 30	HOC	CAT	28th	2
2023	Dinamic GT Huber Racing	Porsche 911 GT3 R (992)	Silver	MNZ; 39	LEC; Ret	SPA; 6H; 51	SPA; 12H; 41	SPA; 24H; 31			10th	37
2023	Dinamic GT with Car Collection	Porsche 911 GT3 R (992)	Silver						NÜR; 40	CAT; 47†	10th	37
2024	Winward Racing	Mercedes-AMG GT3 Evo	Silver	LEC; 19	SPA; 6H; 14	SPA; 12H; 19	**SPA**; **24H**; 28	NÜR; 25	MNZ; 9	JED	1st	102
2025	GetSpeed	Mercedes-AMG GT3 Evo	Silver	LEC; 29	MNZ; 47†	SPA; 6H; 68†	SPA; 12H; 68†	SPA; 24H; Ret	NÜR; 30	CAT; 17	14th	26
2026	Dinamic GT	Porsche 911 GT3 R (992.2)	Silver	LEC; 37	MNZ; 10	SPA; 6H; 48	SPA; 12H; 35	SPA; 24H; 25	NÜR; 43	ALG; Ret	22nd	20

==== GT World Challenge Europe Sprint Cup ====
(key) (Races in bold indicate pole position; results in italics indicate fastest lap)

Year	Team	Car	Class	1	2	3	4	5	6	7	8	9	10	Pos.	Points
2026	Dinamic GT	Porsche 911 GT3 R (992.2)	Silver	BRH; 1; 31	BRH; 2; 30	MIS; 1; 33	MIS; 2; 29	MAG; 1; 37	MAG; 2; 22	ZAN; 1; 33	ZAN; 2; 32	CAT; 1; 27	CAT; 2; 27	10th	18.5
