= 2016 Porsche Carrera Cup Asia =

Motorsport racing season

The 2016 Porsche Carrera Cup Asia was the fourteenth season of the Porsche Carrera Cup Asia. The season commenced on April 17 at the Shanghai International Circuit and finished at the same circuit on November 6.

Despite not scoring any overall wins throughout the season, Nico Menzel became the youngest champion in the series' history at 19 years old. Yuan Bo won the B-Class championship by 10 points over nearest competitor, Vutthikorn Inthraphuvasak.

== Calendar ==
The following venues hosted at least one round of the 2016 championship. The schedule includes two rounds (Fuji and Sydney) which ran concurrently with the Japanese and Australian Carrera Cup Championships. Drivers who compete in the invitational races in these rounds automatically amass ten championship points.

Round	Circuit	Date	Supporting
1	Shanghai International Circuit, Shanghai, China	15–17 April	Chinese Grand Prix; TCR International Series
2	Fuji Speedway, Oyama, Japan	3–5 June	One Make Series Festival; Porsche Carrera Cup Japan
3	Buriram International Circuit, Buriram Province, Thailand	8–10 July	Thailand Super Series; TCR Thailand Touring Car Championship
4	Sydney Motorsport Park, New South Wales, Australia	26–28 August	International V8 Supercars Championship; Porsche Carrera Cup Australia; Australian GT Championship; Toyota Gazoo Racing Australia 86 Series
5	Marina Bay Street Circuit, Marina Bay, Singapore	16–18 September	Singapore Grand Prix; TCR International Series; Ferrari Challenge Asia-Pacific
6	Sepang International Circuit, Selangor, Malaysia	30 September–2 October	Malaysian Grand Prix; GP2 Series; GP3 Series; TCR International Series
7	Shanghai International Circuit, Shanghai, China	4–6 November	FIA World Endurance Championship; Audi R8 LMS Cup

== Teams and drivers ==
Team	No.	Driver	Class	Rounds
(Malaysia) Arrows Racing	2	(Hong Kong) Samson Chan	B	1
(Malaysia) Arrows Racing	2	(Hong Kong) Kenneth Lau	B	2–3, 5–6
(Malaysia) Arrows Racing	17	(Hong Kong) Fung Yui Sum	B	All
(Hong Kong) Kamlung Racing	2	(Hong Kong) Mak Hing Tak	B	4
(Hong Kong) Kamlung Racing	68	(France) Maxime Jousse		All
(Hong Kong) Chong Yau Runme Wong	2	(Hong Kong) Chong Yau Runme Wong	B	7
(Hong Kong) OpenRoad Racing	3	(Indonesia) Michael Soeryadjaya	B	1–2, 4–7
(Hong Kong) OpenRoad Racing	3	(New Zealand) Shaun Varney		3
(Hong Kong) OpenRoad Racing	21	(Hong Kong) Francis Tjia	B	1–2, 4–5, 7
(Hong Kong) OpenRoad Racing	21	(Canada) Scott Hargrove		3
(Hong Kong) Team Jebsen	5	(Singapore) Yuey Tan	B	All
(Hong Kong) Team Jebsen	77	(China) Cui Yue		All
(Hong Kong) Absolute Racing	6	(China) Yuan Bo	B	All
(Hong Kong) Absolute Racing	88	(Australia) Mitchell Gilbert		All
(Malaysia) Team Formax	7	(China) Wang Xi	B	1, 4–5
(Malaysia) Team Formax	7	(Malaysia) Yeo Tee Eong	B	2–3, 7
Racing Spirit Thailand	8	(Thailand) Sontaya Kunplome	B	1–5, 7
Racing Spirit Thailand	8	(Thailand) Preeda Tantemsapya	B	6
(China) Team BetterLife	9	(China) Li Chao	B	All
Porsche China Junior Team	10	(Singapore) Andrew Tang		All
(Chinese Taipei) RC Racing	11	(Chinese Taipei) Jeffery Chiang	B	1, 3
(Chinese Taipei) RC Racing	11	(Chinese Taipei) Tiger Wu	B	2, 4, 7
(Chinese Taipei) RC Racing	11	(Singapore) Ringo Chong	B	6
(Hong Kong) Modena Motorsports	16	(Hong Kong) Wayne Shen	B	All
(Hong Kong) Modena Motorsports	28	(Hong Kong) John Shen	B	All
(Thailand) Chang Racing Team	18	(Thailand) Vutthikorn Inthraphuvasak	B	All
(China) Fun88 Team Sunfonda	19	(China) Zhang Dasheng		All
(Hong Kong) LKM Racing Team	22	(Hong Kong) Siu Yuk Lung		1–2, 4–6
(Hong Kong) LKM Racing Team	22	(New Zealand) Will Bamber		3
(Australia) Paul Tresidder Racing	23	(Australia) Paul Tresidder	B	1–2, 4–7
(China) Zhengtong Auto	55	(China) Bao Jin Long		All
True Visions Motorsports Thailand	78	(Thailand) Suttiluck Buncharoen	B	All
(Germany) Team Porsche Holding	86	(China) Zhang Zhendong		1–2
(Germany) Team Porsche Holding	86	(Austria) Martin Ragginger		3–5, 7
(Germany) Team Porsche Holding	86	(New Zealand) Chris van der Drift		6
(Singapore) PICC Team StarChase	99	(Germany) Nico Menzel		All
(China) Team Carrera Cup Asia	911	(New Zealand) Earl Bamber		7

Icon	Class
B	B Class
	Guest Starter

== Results ==
Round		Circuit	Pole Position	Fastest Lap	Winning Driver	Winning Team	B-Class Winner
1	R1	(China) Shanghai 1	(France) Maxime Jousse	(France) Maxime Jousse	(France) Maxime Jousse	(Hong Kong) Kamlung Racing	(China) Yuan Bo
1	R2	(China) Shanghai 1		(France) Maxime Jousse	(France) Maxime Jousse	(Hong Kong) Kamlung Racing	(Thailand) Vutthikorn Inthraphuvasak
2	R1	(Japan) Fuji	(France) Maxime Jousse	(Singapore) Andrew Tang	(Singapore) Andrew Tang	Porsche China Junior Team	(China) Yuan Bo
2	R2	(Japan) Fuji		(France) Maxime Jousse	(France) Maxime Jousse	(Hong Kong) Kamlung Racing	(China) Yuan Bo
3	R1	(Thailand) Buriram	(France) Maxime Jousse	(Singapore) Andrew Tang	(Singapore) Andrew Tang	Porsche China Junior Team	(China) Yuan Bo
3	R2	(Thailand) Buriram		(Singapore) Andrew Tang	(Canada) Scott Hargrove	(Hong Kong) OpenRoad Racing	(China) Yuan Bo
4	R1	(Australia) Sydney	(France) Maxime Jousse	(Australia) Mitchell Gilbert	(Australia) Mitchell Gilbert	(Hong Kong) Absolute Racing	(China) Yuan Bo
4	R2	(Australia) Sydney		(France) Maxime Jousse	(Australia) Mitchell Gilbert	(Hong Kong) Absolute Racing	(Thailand) Vutthikorn Inthraphuvasak
5		Singapore	(Austria) Martin Ragginger	(France) Maxime Jousse	(Austria) Martin Ragginger	(Germany) Team Porsche Holding	(Thailand) Vutthikorn Inthraphuvasak
6		(Malaysia) Sepang	(New Zealand) Chris van der Drift	(France) Maxime Jousse	(New Zealand) Chris van der Drift	(Germany) Team Porsche Holding	(Singapore) Yuey Tan
7	R1	(China) Shanghai 2	(New Zealand) Earl Bamber	(New Zealand) Earl Bamber	(New Zealand) Earl Bamber	(China) Team Carrera Cup Asia	(Thailand) Vutthikorn Inthraphuvasak
7	R2	(China) Shanghai 2	(Germany) Nico Menzel	(Austria) Martin Ragginger	(Austria) Martin Ragginger	(Germany) Team Porsche Holding	(China) Yuan Bo

== Championship standings ==
=== Scoring system ===
Points were awarded to the top fifteen classified drivers in every race, using the following system:

Position	1st	2nd	3rd	4th	5th	6th	7th	8th	9th	10th	11th	12th	13th	14th	15th	Pole	FL
Points	20	18	16	14	12	10	9	8	7	6	5	4	3	2	1	1	1

=== Overall ===
Pos.	Driver	SHA1 (China)		FUJ (Japan)		BUR (Thailand)		SYD (Australia)		SIN (Singapore)	SEP (Malaysia)	SHA2 (China)		Points
Pos.	Driver	R1	R2	R3	R4	R5	R6	R7	R8	R9	R10	R11	R12	Points
1	(Germany) Nico Menzel	2	2	2	3	5	4	Ret	4	2	2	3	3	203
2	(France) Maxime Jousse	1	1	3	1		3	2	Ret	3		2	2	195
3	(Australia) Mitchell Gilbert	8	5	5	4	4	5	1	1	4	DSQ	4	6	173
4	(Singapore) Andrew Tang	15	4	1	2	1	9	4	3	5	9	7	7	172
5	(China) Zhang Dasheng	7	3	4	5	6	3	7	10	6	3	5	9	161
6	(China) Cui Yue		7	6	12	8	9	6	6	11	4	8	4	122
7	(Thailand) Vutthikorn Inthraphuvasak	4	8	8	10	9	11	10	2	7	8	9	Ret	118
8	(China) Yuan Bo	3	9	7	8	7	8	5	Ret	9	11	20	5	114
9	(Austria) Martin Ragginger					Ret	2	3	5	1		6	1	110
10	(China) Bao Jin Long	6	11	9	7	10		9	11	Ret	6	10	Ret	88
11	(Singapore) Yuey Tan	14		10	14		14	8	7	8	5	Ret	8	79
12	(Hong Kong) Wayne Shen	9	14	12	15	12	12	15	9	12	7	11	10	76
13	(Hong Kong) Francis Tjia		12	11	9			11	8	10		15	Ret	57
14	(Thailand) Suttiluck Buncharoen	10		14		14	Ret	14	12	13	12	13	14	50
15	(China) Li Chao	Ret	10	13	13	11	13	17	15	15		16	12	47
16	(Hong Kong) John Shen	11	13			13	15	13	14	Ret	14	14	13	46
17	(Indonesia) Michael Soeryadjaya	13	Ret		11			12	13			12	11	45
18	(China) Zhang Zhendong	5	6	15	6									43
19	(Canada) Scott Hargrove					2	1							38
20	(Australia) Paul Tresidder	12	15					16	17	14	13	17	16	32
21	(Hong Kong) Siu Yuk Lung				Ret			20	18		15			22
22	(Hong Kong) Fung Yui Sum							19	20			18	Ret	20
23	(Thailand) Sontaya Kunplome							21	19			19	17	20
24	(Chinese Taipei) Tiger Wu				Ret			18	16					20
25	(New Zealand) Will Bamber					6	7							19
26	(Hong Kong) Kenneth Lau					15				Ret	16			12
27	(Hong Kong) Wang Xi							22	21	Ret		23	19	10
28	(Malaysia) Yeo Tee Eong					Ret								10
29	(Hong Kong) Mak Hing Tak							DNS	DNS					10
30	(Singapore) Ringo Chong										10			7
-	(Chinese Taipei) Jeffery Chiang					Ret	DNS					Ret	DNS	0
-	(Hong Kong) Samson Chan													0
-	(New Zealand) Shaun Varney					Ret	Ret							0
-	(Hong Kong) Daniel Andrew Bilski					Ret	Ret							0
Guest drivers ineligible for points
-	(New Zealand) Chris van der Drift										1			0
-	(New Zealand) Earl Bamber											1	DNS	0
-	(Hong Kong) Chong Yau Runme Wong											22	15	0
-	(Hong Kong) Siu Tit Lung											21	18	0
Pos.	Driver	R1	R2	R3	R4	R5	R6	R7	R8	R9	R10	R11	R12	Points
Pos.	Driver	SHA1 (China)		FUJ (Japan)		BUR (Thailand)		SYD (Australia)		SIN (Singapore)	SEP (Malaysia)	SHA2 (China)		Points

== See also ==
- 2016 Porsche Supercup
- 2016 Porsche Carrera Cup Australia
- 2016 Porsche Carrera Cup Germany
- 2016 Porsche Carrera Cup Great Britain
- 2016 Porsche Carrera Cup Italia
