= 2017 Porsche Carrera Cup Asia =

Motorsport racing season

The 2017 Porsche Carrera Cup Asia was the fifteenth season of the Porsche Carrera Cup Asia. The season commenced on April 7 at the Shanghai International Circuit and finished at the same circuit on November 5.

Chris van der Drift won his second Porsche Carrera Cup Asia title on his full-time return to the category. Evan Chen won the Pro-Am championship while Team Porsche Holding won the newly-established Dealer Trophy.

== Calendar ==
The following venues hosted at least one round of the 2017 championship.

Round	Circuit	Date	Supporting
1	Shanghai International Circuit, Shanghai, China	7–9 April	Chinese Grand Prix
2	Fuji Speedway, Oyama, Japan	2–4 June	One Make Series Festival; Porsche Carrera Cup Japan
3	Bangsaen Street Circuit, Bang Saen, Thailand	30 June–2 July	Thailand Super Series; TCR Asia Series
4	Sepang International Circuit, Selangor, Malaysia	21–23 July	Asian Le Mans Sprint Cup; Porsche Carrera Cup Australia
5	Marina Bay Street Circuit, Marina Bay, Singapore	15–17 September	Singapore Grand Prix; Ferrari Challenge Asia-Pacific
6	Sepang International Circuit, Selangor, Malaysia	29 September–1 October	Malaysian Grand Prix; Formula 4 South East Asia Championship
7	Shanghai International Circuit, Shanghai, China	3–5 November	FIA World Endurance Championship

== Teams and drivers ==
Team	No.	Driver	Class	Rounds
(Malaysia) Arrows Racing	2	(Macau) Liu Lic Ka	PA	1–2
(Malaysia) Arrows Racing	2	(Hong Kong) Yu Kam Cheong	PA	3
(Malaysia) Arrows Racing	2	(Hong Kong) Kelvin Kwan	PA	7
(Malaysia) Arrows Racing	4	(Hong Kong) Kenneth Lau	PA	1–4, 6
(Malaysia) Arrows Racing	17	(Hong Kong) Fung Yui Sum	PA	All
(Hong Kong) OpenRoad Racing	3	(Indonesia) Michael Soeryadjaya	PA	2, 4
(Hong Kong) OpenRoad Racing	21	(Hong Kong) Francis Tjia	PA	1–5, 7
(Hong Kong) OpenRoad Racing	69	(Canada) Christian Chia	PA	1, 3–5, 7
(New Zealand) Team NZ	3	(New Zealand) Graeme Dowsett	PA	6
(Hong Kong) Team Jebsen	5	(Singapore) Yuey Tan	PA	All
(Hong Kong) Team Jebsen	77	(China) Cui Yue	P	All
(Malaysia) Team Formax	7	(New Zealand) Chris van der Drift	P	All
Racing Spirit Thailand	5	(Thailand) Sontaya Kunplome	PA	2–3, 5, 7
Racing Spirit Thailand	5	(Thailand) Preeda Tantemsapya	PA	1, 4
(China) Team BetterLife	9	(China) Li Chao	PA	All
Porsche China Junior Team	10	(Singapore) Andrew Tang	P	All
Porsche China Junior Team	19	(China) Zhang Dasheng	P	All
(Chinese Taipei) RC Racing	11	(Australia) Stephen Grove	PA	1–2
(Chinese Taipei) RC Racing	11	(South Korea) Rick Yoon	PA	5
(China) FAW T2 Motorsport	12	(New Zealand) Will Bamber	P	All
(Hong Kong) Absolute Racing	15	(Thailand) Tanart Sathienthirakul	P	All
(Hong Kong) Modena Motorsports	16	(Hong Kong) Wayne Shen	PA	All
(Hong Kong) Modena Motorsports	28	(Hong Kong) John Shen	PA	All
(Hong Kong) Modena Motorsports	33	(Hong Kong) Antares Au	PA	1
(Hong Kong) LKM Racing	22	(Hong Kong) Siu Yuk Lung	PA	1–2, 4–6
(Hong Kong) LKM Racing	22	(Malaysia) Timothy Yeo	PA	3
(Hong Kong) LKM Racing	22	(Hong Kong) Siu Tit Lung	PA	7
(Australia) Paul Tresidder Racing	23	(Australia) Paul Tresidder	PA	All
(Malaysia) Force Asia Racing	29	(Malaysia) Akash Nandy	P	All
(China) Zheng Tong Auto	55	(China) Bao Jin Long	P	All
(Hong Kong) Kamlung Racing	68	(Chinese Taipei) Evan Chen	PA	All
True Visions Motorsports Thailand	78	(Thailand) Suttiluck Buncharoen	PA	All
(Germany) Team Porsche Holding	86	(Austria) Martin Ragginger	P	All
(China) Team C&D Auto	88	(China) Yuan Bo	P	All
(Singapore) Team StarChase	99	(Germany) Philip Hamprecht	P	All

Icon	Class
P	Pro Cup
PA	Pro-Am Cup
	Guest Starter

== Results ==
Round		Circuit	Pole Position	Fastest Lap	Winning Driver	Winning Team	B-Class Winner
1	R1	(China) Shanghai 1	(Singapore) Andrew Tang	(Singapore) Andrew Tang	(Austria) Martin Ragginger	(Germany) Team Porsche Holding	(China) Li Chao
1	R2	(China) Shanghai 1	(Singapore) Andrew Tang	(Malaysia) Akash Nandy	(New Zealand) Will Bamber	(China) FAW T2 Motorsport	(Chinese Taipei) Evan Chen
2	R1	(Japan) Fuji	(Austria) Martin Ragginger	(Austria) Martin Ragginger	(Austria) Martin Ragginger	(Germany) Team Porsche Holding	(Chinese Taipei) Evan Chen
2	R2	(Japan) Fuji	(Germany) Philip Hamprecht	(Austria) Martin Ragginger	(New Zealand) Chris van der Drift	(Malaysia) Team Formax	(Chinese Taipei) Evan Chen
3	R1	(Thailand) Bangsaen	(New Zealand) Will Bamber	(New Zealand) Chris van der Drift	(New Zealand) Will Bamber	(China) FAW T2 Motorsport	(Singapore) Yuey Tan
3	R2	(Thailand) Bangsaen	(New Zealand) Will Bamber		(New Zealand) Will Bamber	(China) FAW T2 Motorsport	(Hong Kong) Francis Tjia
4	R1	(Malaysia) Sepang 1	(New Zealand) Chris van der Drift	(Germany) Philip Hamprecht	(New Zealand) Chris van der Drift	(Malaysia) Team Formax	(Singapore) Yuey Tan
4	R2	(Malaysia) Sepang 1	(New Zealand) Chris van der Drift	(New Zealand) Will Bamber	(New Zealand) Will Bamber	(China) FAW T2 Motorsport	(Hong Kong) Francis Tjia
5	R1	Singapore	(Austria) Martin Ragginger	(Austria) Martin Ragginger	(Germany) Philip Hamprecht	(Singapore) Team StarChase	(Chinese Taipei) Evan Chen
5	R2	Singapore	(Austria) Martin Ragginger		(Austria) Martin Ragginger	(Germany) Team Porsche Holding	(Chinese Taipei) Evan Chen
6		(Malaysia) Sepang 2	(Austria) Martin Ragginger	(Germany) Philip Hamprecht	(Austria) Martin Ragginger	(Germany) Team Porsche Holding	(Chinese Taipei) Evan Chen
7	R1	(China) Shanghai 2	(New Zealand) Chris van der Drift	(New Zealand) Chris van der Drift	(New Zealand) Chris van der Drift	(Malaysia) Team Formax	(Singapore) Yuey Tan
7	R2	(China) Shanghai 2	(New Zealand) Chris van der Drift	(Germany) Philip Hamprecht	(Germany) Philip Hamprecht	(Singapore) Team StarChase	(Chinese Taipei) Evan Chen

== Championship standings ==
=== Scoring system ===
Points were awarded to the top fifteen classified drivers in every race, using the following system:

Position	1st	2nd	3rd	4th	5th	6th	7th	8th	9th	10th	11th	12th	13th	14th	15th	Pole	FL
Points	20	18	16	14	12	10	9	8	7	6	5	4	3	2	1	1	1

=== Overall ===
Pos.	Driver	SHA1 (China)		FUJ (Japan)		BNG (Thailand)		SEP1 (Malaysia)		SIN (Singapore)		SEP2 (Malaysia)	SHA2 (China)		Points
Pos.	Driver	R1	R2	R3	R4	R5	R6	R7	R8	R9	R10	R11	R12	R13	Points
1	(New Zealand) Chris van der Drift	4	3	3	1	2	2	1	3	8	2	3	1	6	235
2	(Austria) Martin Ragginger	1	2	1	2	4	4	6	2	6	1	1	7	5	228
3	(New Zealand) Will Bamber	3	1	4	4	1	1	Ret	1	9	3	2	2	4	220
4	(Singapore) Andrew Tang	1	5	2	Ret	6	9	3	4	3	7	6	3	2	186
5	(Germany) Philip Hamprecht	9	4	6	Ret	3	3	2	DSQ	1	5	4	5	1	182
6	(China) Zhang Dasheng	5	8	7	3	8	8	4	5	2	4	8	4	3	177
7	(Thailand) Tanart Sathienthirakul	8	6	5	5	5	5	Ret	22	4	6	7	9	7	135
8	(Malaysia) Akash Nandy		22	9	6	7	7	5	6	5	9	5	10	Ret	115
9	(China) Yuan Bo	6	7	8		Ret	10	Ret	8	10	8	10	6	10	97
10	(China) Cui Yue	7	9	Ret	11	Ret	6	Ret	7	6	12	9	8	Ret	89
11	(Singapore) Yuey Tan	12	15	11	8	9	13	7	Ret	12	11	13	11	9	81
12	(Chinese Taipei) Evan Chen		11	10	7	10	12	DSQ	16	11	10	11	12	8	78
13	(China) Bao Jin Long	10	10	14	15	13	Ret	8	9	Ret	DNS	12	15	22	58
14	(Hong Kong) Francis Tjia		Ret	Ret	9	11	11	11	10	13	15		14	12	58
15	(Hong Kong) Wayne Shen	15	12	Ret	12			9	11			14	13	11	51
16	(China) Li Chao	11	17	12	Ret	12		10	12	14	14	15	Ret	15	49
17	(Thailand) Suttiluck Buncharoen	13	23		14	14	14	15	Ret	15			16	13	34
18	(Indonesia) Michael Soeryadjaya			15	10			12	18						31
19	(Hong Kong) John Shen	14	Ret			15	15	20	20		13		22	17	27
20	(Australia) Paul Tresidder		16			Ret		13	14				18	16	25
21	(Hong Kong) Fung Yui Sum		19					19	21				19	20	20
22	(Hong Kong) Siu Yuk Lung		20					17	19						20
23	(Canada) Christian Chia		14					14	13				17	14	19
24	(Australia) Stephen Grove				13										16
25	(Thailand) Preeda Tantemsapya		13					16	15						14
26	(Thailand) Sontaya Kunplome			DNS							Ret		20	18	10
27	(Macau) Liu Lic Ka		18	Ret											10
28	(Hong Kong) Kenneth Lau							18	17						10
-	(Hong Kong) Antares Au		21												0
-	(Hong Kong) Yu Kam Cheong						Ret								0
-	(Malaysia) Timothy Yeo					Ret	Ret								0
Guest drivers ineligible for points
-	(Hong Kong) Kelvin Kwan												23	19	0
-	(Hong Kong) Siu Tit Lung												21	21	0
Pos.	Driver	R1	R2	R3	R4	R5	R6	R7	R8	R9	R10	R11	R12	R13	Points
Pos.	Driver	SHA1 (China)		FUJ (Japan)		BNG (Thailand)		SEP1 (Malaysia)		SIN (Singapore)		SEP2 (Malaysia)	SHA2 (China)		Points

== See also ==
- 2017 Porsche Supercup
- 2017 Porsche Carrera Cup Australia
- 2017 Porsche GT3 Cup Brasil
- 2017 Porsche Carrera Cup Germany
- 2017 Porsche Carrera Cup Great Britain
