= Andrew Tang (racing driver) =

Singaporean racing driver

- Nationality: (Singapore) Singaporean
- Born: 13 November 1994 (age 32)
- Wins: 5
- Poles: 2
- Fastest laps: 6

Previous series
- 2013 2013 2013-2014 2016: Formula Renault 2.0 Alps; Formula Renault 2.0 NEC; Toyota Racing Series; Porsche Carrera Cup Asia

Championship titles
- 2014: Toyota Racing Series

Andrew Tang (simplified Chinese: 邓立恒; traditional Chinese: 鄧立恆; pinyin: Dèng Lìhéng, born 13 November 1994) is a Singaporean former racing driver who is best known for winning the 2014 Toyota Racing Series.

== Education ==
Tang studied in an IB Diploma Programme with SJI International School.

== Career ==
Tang was offered to join the Dutch PDB Racing Team – run by 1980 world champion Peter de Bruijn – but refused the offer as it was too far away and he felt the pressure from racing. He also gave up racing then at the age of 11.

Tang joined the McLaren Young Driver Programme in July 2012 and moved to Guildford, England. Driving for Neale Motorsport, he became the champion of the 2014 Toyota Racing Series held in New Zealand.

In 2014, Tang attempted to defer his National Service (NS) in Singapore in order to keep on racing but was denied and he served his NS.

After finishing his NS, Tang joined the Porsche China Junior team after becoming the top racer in the Porsche China Junior Programme in December 2015. He also won a sponsorship to race in Class A of the Porsche Carrera Cup Asia. Tang won his first Porsche Carrera Cup Asia race in the fifth round at the Fuji Speedway.

In 2016, Tang's contract with Porsche China Junior team was extended for another year and would represent PCCA in the Porsche Motorsport Junior Programme shootout.

== Racing record ==
=== Career summary ===
Season	Series	Team	Races	Wins	Poles	F/Laps	Podiums	Points	Position
2013	Toyota Racing Series	ETEC Motorsport	15	0	0	0	0	345	15th
2013	Formula Renault 2.0 Alps Series	Jenzer Motorsport	14	0	0	0	0	18	20th
2013	Formula Renault 2.0 Northern European Cup	Jenzer Motorsport	2	0	0	0	0	16	38th
2014	Toyota Racing Series	Neale Motorsport	15	3	1	5	9	794	**1st**
2014	Formula Renault 2.0 Alps Series	Prema Powerteam	2	0	0	0	0	24	17th
2016	Porsche Carrera Cup Asia	Porsche China Junior Team	12	2	1	3	4	172	4th
2016	Porsche Supercup	Porsche China Junior Team	1	0	0	0	0	0	NC†
2017	Porsche Carrera Cup Asia	Porsche China Junior Team	13	0	2	1	6	186	4th
2017	China GT Championship - GTC	JRM JiaRui-TengDa	10	0	3	0	4	123	**3rd**

† As Tang was a guest driver, he was ineligible to score points.

=== Complete Formula Renault 2.0 NEC results ===
(key) (Races in bold indicate pole position) (Races in italics indicate fastest lap)

Year	Entrant	1	2	3	4	5	6	7	8	9	10	11	12	13	14	15	16	17	DC	Points
2013	Jenzer Motorsport	HOC; 1	HOC; 2	HOC; 3	NÜR; 1	NÜR; 2	SIL; 1	SIL; 2	SPA; 1	SPA; 2	ASS; 1	ASS; 2	MST; 1	MST; 2	MST; 3	ZAN; 1; 14	ZAN; 2; 12	ZAN; 3 C	38th	16

=== Complete Formula Renault 2.0 Alps Series results ===
(key) (Races in bold indicate pole position; races in italics indicate fastest lap)

Year	Team	1	2	3	4	5	6	7	8	9	10	11	12	13	14	Pos	Points
2013	Jenzer Motorsport	VLL; 1; 12	VLL; 2; 15	IMO1; 1; 15	IMO1; 2; 14	SPA; 1; 6	SPA; 2; 8	MNZ; 1 Ret	MNZ; 2; 9	MIS; 1; 13	MIS; 2; 21	MUG; 1; 23	MUG; 2; 22	IMO2; 1; 9	IMO2; 2 Ret	20th	18
2014	Prema Powerteam	IMO; 1; 8	IMO; 2; 7	PAU; 1	PAU; 2	RBR; 1	RBR; 2	SPA; 1	SPA; 2	MNZ; 1	MNZ; 2	MUG; 1	MUG; 2	JER; 1	JER; 2	17th	24

Sporting positions
Preceded by Nick Cassidy	Toyota Racing Series; Champion; 2014	Succeeded by Lance Stroll
