= Superrace Championship =

Motorsports competition in South Korea

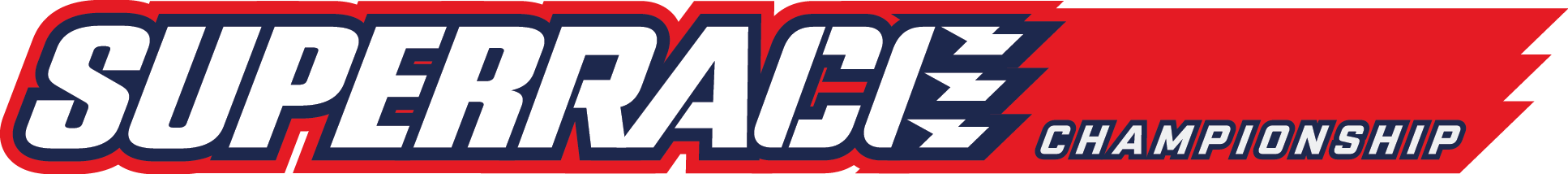
- Category: Grand touring Touring car
- Country: South Korea
- Inaugural season: 2006
- Drivers' champion: (South Korea) Kim Jong-kyum (2022)
- Teams' champion: (South Korea) Hankook ATLASBX Motorsports (2022)
- Official website: www.super-race.com

Superrace Championship is an auto racing series in South Korea. It is organized by the Superrace Co., Ltd., and recognized by the Korea Automobile Racing Association (KARA).

The Super 6000 class, the Superrace Championship's top-tier series, is Asia's only stock car race that has been recognized by the International Automobile Federation (FIA). As of 2021, CJ Logistics is the title sponsor, and its official name is CJ Logistics Superrace Championship.

== History ==
The Superrace Championship first took place in 2007. The predecessor was the Korea GT Championship (KGTC), which began in 2006 and has continued to the present in 2021 after the changing the name to the Superrace Championship in 2007. The competition's official name has been changing depending on the title sponsor, and so far, CJ O Shopping, TVing, and CJ Hello Vision have all joined as sponsors. From 2016 to the present, CJ Logistics has always been a title sponsor and the event is known as the 'CJ Logistics Superrace Championship.' It had the 100th Superrace Championship in the first round of the 2020 season which recorded a total of 107 matches by 2020.

The race for the top class, the Super 6000, started from the third round with the introduction of the stock car in 2008. At the beginning, 5 teams and 8 drivers participated but the race has constantly expanded to a competition with more than 20 drivers. Unlike mass-produced regular automobiles, stock cars are designed specifically for races. Depending on the cowl, the vehicle's design can look similar but its mechanical characteristics are totally different. It is known as the top-level race in Korea as only the racers with International C or higher license can participate. The cowl of Super 6000 has been using Toyota GR Supra since 2020 after going through Spira (2008), Cadillac CTS (2009), Hyundai Genesis (2012), Cadillac ATS-V (2016). There have been 96 races by the 2020 season, and the 100th race will be held in the 4th round of the 2021 season.

The Superrace Championship was the first to hold a night race in 2012. Aside from the various night races, it was the first to adopt the idea of ‘Motortainment,' which mixes motorsport and entertainment. It is credited with helping to popularize motorsport by trying to relay broadcasting via terrestrial TV.

From 2013, Asian tours have been conducted in Korea as well as in Japan and China. They began to have successful interactions by promoting Korean races to neighboring countries. The effort led to Korea-China Motor Sports Festival (2014), the Korea-China-Japan Motor Sports Festival (2015), the Korea-China-Japan Motor Sports Carnival (2016), the Asian Motor Sports Carnival launched in 2017, and the Gangwon World Motor Festival started in 2018. It has been developed and is still being continued to this day.

The Superrace Championship reopened in 2016, when Everland Speedway reconstruction was completed after an eight-year hiatus, and it has significantly increased the popularity of domestic motor sports. The International Automobile Federation (FIA) accepted the Super 6000 class as an international series in 2016, and modifications were made, such as changing the cowl to the Cadillac ATS-V. As CJ Logistics participated as the competition's title sponsor, and CJ Racing, a prestigious team, were divided into CJ Logistics, CheilJedang, and E&M. The overall race was enhanced for both quantity and quality.

As the reopening of circuits in the Seoul metropolitan area combined with various changes, the number of visitors steadily increased. More than 20,000 audiences gathered at Everland Speedway for the 2018 season opening which showed a different atmosphere than before. More than 40,000 people visited the same location at the final show in 2019, breaking the record for the most visits ever. In 2019, the average number of on-site visitors to the Superrace Championship was 22,000, for a total of about 180,000 visitors. Despite the fact that there is a gap in the overall number of games played in the season, the Superrace Championship has the largest number of games played among professional sports in Korea that year.

In 2020 due to COVID-19, which pushed the world into chaos, the race couldn’t open as planned. The first game, which was supposed to take place in April, was postponed twice and finally took place in June. The season was cut from 8 games (9 rounds) to 5 games (8 rounds), with the final game played in late November, one month later than in the previous years. It was recorded as the latest race in history. Although all 2020 season matches were played behind closed doors, there were no COVID-19 cases on the tournament field.

== Circuits ==
The Superrace hosts six to eight races throughout the year at the major circuits in South Korea. In 2026 the three circuits are Korea International Circuit in South Jeolla, Everland Speedway in Gyeonggi, and Inje Speedium in Gangwon. The series competed at Taebaek Racing Park in Gangwon until 2014. From 2010 to 2016 it also visited racetracks in Japan and China:

- (Japan) Autopolis (2010) 2014
- (Japan) Suzuka Circuit (2013)
- (Japan) Fuji Speedway (2015-2016)
- (China) Guangdong International Circuit (2015)
- (China) Shanghai International Circuit (2014-2016)
- (China) Shanghai Tianma Circuit (2013-2014)
- (China) Zhuhai International Circuit (2016)

The Superrace Championship uses a different theme for each round. These changes are intended to provide variety for the viewers.

The Night Race was held annually at Taebaek Racing Park until 2014, and at Inje Speedium since 2015. The first winner was Eui-soo Kim. The Night Race takes place in a club-like atmosphere, with DJ music and lighting. The event did not take place in 2020 due to COVID-19.

The Asian Motorsports Carnival is held at the Korean International Circuit (KIC) since 2017. It is an event that has attracted a lot of attention every year by inviting various overseas race series based in Asia, as a support race to the Superrace Championship to showcase new races which are difficult to see in Korea. So far, various races including the Audi R8 LMS Cup, Touring Car Series Asia (TCSA), Super Formula Junior, Asia Drifting Cup, GT World Challenge Asia, Lamborghini Super Trofeo Asia have been held through the Asian Motorsports Carnival. Due to travel restrictions between nations arising from COVID-19, the races were unable to be held in 2020.

The Gangwon International Motor Festa is held in Inje Speedium since 2018. it features not only races but also a variety of motorsports genres spanning drifts, gymkhanas, echo rallies, etc. On top of the motorsports competition, a concert festival hosting famous singers have also been held to house an event that the audience, crew and even the locals could enjoy together. In 2019, this concert was broadcast on the general programming channel Channel A, which normally broadcasts the Superrace Championship in real time.

== Racing classes ==
The 2021 CJ Logistics Superrace Championship hosts a total of 5 classes – Super 6000, KUMHO GT, M Class, Cadillac CT4 and the Radical Cup Korea.

Super 6000 is the top tier class of the Superrace Championship, with the very best drivers both domestic and international, participating ever since it began in 2008. Stock cars are designed solely for racing, with only the necessary devices and driver safety equipment inside and nothing else. Every stock car participating in the race is equipped with the identical 6,200cc V8 engine from General Motors with 460 horsepower. The appearance of stock cars differs depending on the body sponsor company. Since 2020, a design based on the Toyota GR Supra has been adopted. The minimum weight of the car is 1,270 kg and although it is possible for the car to get heavier due to the handicap regulations, it is prohibited from becoming any lighter. Every participant car is able to choose a tire manufacturer of their liking. However, a very prudent strategy is warranted because only a limited number of tires are to be used all the way from the warm up, practice run, qualifying matches to the finals. In each round, Championship Points are granted according to the finishing ranks. The driver or team with the highest sum of Championship points becomes the season’s champion.

Kumho GT features production-cased cars, tuned within the set regulations for racing purposes. Based on the 2021 revision of the race regulations, only vehicles which have gone through a comprehensive approval process involving engine type, capacity and other factors approved by the standing organization committee may participate. According to these criteria, the race is further divided into the GT1 and GT2 classes. The GT racing class is particularly interesting due to the numerous variables which are present; the change in vehicle performance from the tuning, the individual capability of the drivers, and especially the simultaneous track usage of the GT1 and GT2 races make it a something you can’t take your eyes off.

The M Class was newly established as one of the official classes of the Superrace Championship in 2018. It is a one-make racing series featuring the M4(F82) Coupe model, BMW’s high-performance sports car lineup. BMW’s M4 Coupe can reach up to 450 horsepower with its straight 6, 3.0L twin power turbo engines. A M4 Coupe one-make racing series was held for the first time in the world at the Superrace Championship, and to this date is the only one of its kind. As there is minimal tuning done to the vehicle other than for driver safety measures, the racing class showcases the true performance and potential of the M4 Coupe model for the audience. The race is a semi-pro class, in which drivers with the Korean Automobile Racing Association (KARA) Level B license are allowed to participate.

The Cadillac CT4 Class is a one-make racing series introduced racing class in the 2021 season that features the Cadillac CT4 sports sedan. Participation is allowed with minimum R-tuning, and the race is to be carried out in a time-trial manner. KARA Level C License ownership is required for participation. The Cadillac CT4 has a 2,000 cc straight 4 engine with approximately 240 horsepower.

The Radical Cup is a one-make sports prototype class, with open cockipts and covered wheels. The Radical Cup Korea in the Superrace Championship is further divided into the SR1 and SR3 classes depending on the vehicle models. The SR1 has a 1,340 cc four-cylinder engine with up to 182 horsepower. Because the vehicle weighs only 490 kilograms, it does 0-60 mph in 3.5 seconds with a maximum velocity of 222 kilometers per hour. The SR3 may choose either a 1,340 cc or 1,500 cc engine. The maximum horsepower for the two models is 195 and 226, respectively. The vehicle weighs 615 kilograms. Performance-wise the vehicles are as competent as a supercar, and with a powerful downforce and aerodynamic design increasing grip and reducing drag, they boast a robust and rapid movement.

== Rules ==
The races consist largely of practice runs, qualifiers and finals.

=== Weekend format ===
Qualifying

Every racing class of the Superrace Championship plays qualifiers and finals to determine the ranking of each round. The grid position in the finals is decided by the lap record of the official qualifying match. The official qualifying match of the Super 6000 Class will be played in a time-trial knock out method consisting of Q1 and Q2 rounds. The top 10 racers of Q1(15 minutes) will make it to Q2. Q2 will be held for 10 minutes. The final grid position will be assigned in the order of the best Q2 and Q1 lap records. The 1st, 2nd and 3rd place winners of the qualifying matches will each receive 3, 2 and 1 qualifier points.

The KUMHO GT Class, M Class and Radical Cup Korea Class will hold qualifiers in a time-trial method. In the M Class, the 1st, 2nd and 3rd place winners of the prior finals will receive a handicap in their lap records of the following official qualifying match. The former 1st place winner will have 104% of their lap time in the qualifiers as the official record. The 2nd and 3rd place winners will have 102% and 101%, respectively.

The 107% rule was newly introduced since 2020, limiting the participation in the finals. If a participant holds a lap record longer than 107% of the best lap record in the qualifying match (Q1 in the Super 6000 Class), he/she cannot participate in the finals. The 2021 revision allows the 107% rule to be applied by each tire manufacturer in the Super 6000 Class.

Racing Class	Race Method	Note
Super 6000	Q1(15 min), Q2(10 min) Knock Out	Final Grid Position assigned according to best Q2 à Q1 lap records
KUMHO GT1	Time-trial (20 min)	Final Grid Position assigned according to best lap record
KUMHO GT2	Time-trial (15 min)	Final Grid Position assigned according to best lap record
M Class	Time-trial (30 min)	Final Grid Position assigned according to best lap record
Radical Cup Korea	Time-trial (20 min)	Final Grid Position assigned according to best lap record

Final race

Excluding the Cadillac CT4 Class which is proceeded in a Time Trial race format, all classes of the Superrace Championship is proceeded in a sprint format where the positions are determined in the order of fastest completion for a set number of laps. Race starting methods for each class can either be a standing start or a rolling start, which may differ per race depending on the decision of the competition’s organizing committee.

All participating vehicles of the race must complete a formation lap in the grid formation while following a safety car (SC) at the lead. During this lap, the distance between vehicles may not exceed more than 5 vehicle lengths and overtaking is not allowed. In the instance of a standing start, after the arrangement of the grid is complete, the tires may not move after the red light has been lit and if the front bumper protrudes over the grid line, a penalty may be given. In the instance of a rolling start, once the ‘GRID’ board has been presented, vehicles must be in 2 rows, the distance between vehicles may not exceed 1 vehicle length and vehicles must not go over the front bumper of the vehicles in front of them. If this is violated, a penalty may be given on the basis of a false start.

If 75% or more of the total set laps are raced by a driver, 1 additional completion point is added.

=== Championship points ===
The overall positions for all classes of the Superrace Championship are determined by the total earned points in each round. The Super 6000 Class has the 2 titles - the Driver Championship and the Team Championship. All other classes only award the Driver Championship title.

Driver Championship

In the Super 6000 Class, 3~1 points are given respectively to the Best Lap 1st~3rd Place, and in the KUMHO GT1, GT2 Classes, 3~1 preliminary points are given respectively to the 1st~3rd Place of the qualifiers. If 75% or more of the total set laps are raced by a driver, 1 completion point is added. Resultantly, the maximum number of points that can be earned in one fixture is 29 points. (3 points for 1st Place in the qualifiers, 25 points for 1st Place in the finals, and 1 completion point.)

If the total series points are tied, preference is given to the driver with higher position results.

Position	1st Place	2nd Place	3rd Place	4th Place	5th Place	6th Place	7th Place	8th Place	9th Place	10th Place	≥11th Place
Race Points	25	18	15	12	10	8	6	4	2	1	-
Completion Points	1 Point given upon completion of race										
Preliminary Points	Super 6000: Best Lap 1st~3rd Place, KUMHO GT1-2 Class : Preliminary 1st ~ 3rd Place / 3~1 points given respectively										

Teams Championship

Team championship points are applied by adding the points earned by 2 drivers in each team, and teams with 3 or more drivers must select 2 drivers whose points will be added for the team championship points 15 days before the date of each round’s race.

=== Handicap Weight ===
The Super 6000 Class and the KUMHO GT1, GT2 Class race participants are given a handicap weight depending on their race position results. Handicap weight applies to the driver, not the vehicle, meaning that even if a driver changes teams during the series, the same weight will continue to apply to that specific driver. The application of the handicap weight is only allowed for a separate ballast regardless of the weight of the vehicle, and deduction is done on the applied handicap weight. Handicap weight is applied to any driver who races for the first time after the opening race. (Super 6000 : 80KG, KUMHO GT1&2 : 60KG) If a driver does not participate in a race or is disqualified, handicap weight won’t be deducted.

In the instance of M Class, additional lap time is applied on the qualifiers record of the next competition to the official 1st, 2nd and 3rd place drivers of the previous competition. (1st Place: 104%, 2nd Place: 102%, 3rd Place: 101%)

Super 6000 CLASS

1st Place	2nd Place	3rd Place	4th Place	5th Place	6th Place	7th Place	8th Place	9th Place	10th Place	≥11th Place (retire)
+80kg	+40kg	+20kg	0 kg	-10kg	-20kg	-30kg	-40kg	-50kg	-60kg	-70kg

KUMHO GT1, KUMHO GT2 CLASS

1st Place	2nd Place	3rd Place	4th Place	5th Place	6th Place	7th Place	8th Place	9th Place	10th Place	≥11th Place (retire)
+60kg	+40kg	+20kg	+10kg	0 kg	-10kg	-20kg	-30kg	-40kg	-50kg	-60kg

※Maximum Handicap Weight

Super 6000 Class : 150 kg / KUMHO GT1, GT2 Class: 120 kg

=== 4. Tires ===
For the official vehicle inspection of each event, tire markings take place, which are separate from the maximum tire marking amounts for each class. Even if the number of markings given during the official vehicle inspection is less than the maximum allowed number, additional markings are not allowed afterwards. However, if tires are damaged during the qualifiers and the participation in races are improbable, additional marking may be received after the preliminary rounds under the permission of the technical chairman. In this instance, the Super 6000 Class may choose from the event’s practice tires and the KUMHO GT Class may choose from second-hand tires for additional marking. With the additional marking of tires, a grid place demotion penalty is given.

CLASS	COMPETITION		DRY	WET
Super 6000	R1	Practice, Warm-up	new product, 8ea	new product, 12ea
Super 6000	R1	Qualifying, Final	new product, 4ea	new product, 12ea
Super 6000	R2~R6	Warm-up, Practice	new product, 4ea Marking tires for the last tournament, 6ea	new product, 8ea Marking tires for the last tournament, 6ea
Super 6000	R2~R6	Qualifying, Final	new product, 4ea	new product, 8ea Marking tires for the last tournament, 6ea
Super 6000	R7-8 (FINAL ROUND)	Warm-up, Practice	new product, 4ea Marking tires for the last tournament, 8ea	new product, 8ea Marking tires for the last tournament, 6ea
Super 6000	R7-8 (FINAL ROUND)	Qualifying, Final	new product, 4ea (for each round)	new product, 8ea Marking tires for the last tournament, 6ea
KUMHO GT 1 / 2	R1~FINAL ROUND	Qualifying, Final	new product, 6ea	Free if it's an official tire.
M	R1~FINAL ROUND	Warm-up, Qualifying, Final	전륜 3본, 후륜 3본	Combined with DRY and WET
CT4	R1~FINAL ROUND	Qualifying, Final	4본	Combined with DRY and WET
Radical Cup Korea	R1~FINAL ROUND	Warm-up, Qualifying, Final	new product, 8ea	new product, 8ea

=== Match Operation Flag ===
International flag signals inform spectators and racers of what is happening on at the racetrack. From the start of the race to the end of the final, flag signals convey a range of details. Flag signals are provided at each post, including the main post, and in domestic auto races, the International Automobile Federation's international standard flag signals are used.

In the 2020 Superrace season, the Full Course Yellow (FCY) regulation was introduced. FCY can be applied for practices, qualifiers, or finals, and can be declared at the race director's decision if necessary for safety reasons. When FCY is announced, all posts will issue the yellow flag, and the FCY board is posted. All the cars must travel slowly at speeds no faster than 80 km/h, and overtaking is strictly forbidden. In the FCY situation, the SC has the authority to act if necessary. When the green flag is shown and the FCY board is removed, the FCY situation is resolved and the game continues as well as overtaking is allowed. The lap driven during FCY is counted in the total driving lap.

== Broadcasting ==
The Superrace Championship Super 6000 Class Final match will be broadcast live on Channel A, Channel A Plus and XtvN, while the KUMHO GT1 and 2 Finals will be broadcast live on Channel A Plus. All 5 classes can be viewed on Superrace's official website, YouTube, Facebook, Kakao TV and Naver TV.

Class	TV Broadcast	DIGITAL Broadcast
Super 6000	Channel A, Channel A Plus, XtvN	Superrace Official Website, YouTube, Facebook, Kakao TV, Naver TV
KUMHO GT1,2	Channel A Plus	Superrace Official Website, YouTube, Facebook, Kakao TV, Naver TV
M Class, CT4 Class, Radical Cup Korea	-	Superrace Official Website, YouTube, Facebook, Kakao TV, Naver TV

== Special Point Program - CJ Logistics Fastest Lap Point ==
A new point system will be introduced in 2021 to recognize drivers who achieve fast lap times. CJ Logistics, the Superrace’s title sponsor from 2016 to 2021, owns the right to award. Points are awarded to the driver who placed first to third in the Super 6000 Class Finals record from each round, and the scores of all eight rounds are accumulated and awarded once a year (at the Final Round).

1st	2nd	3rd
+30 point	+20 point	+10 point

== Champions ==
Season	Moniker	Class	Drivers' Champion	Teams' Champion
2006	Korea GT Championship	GT-1	Hwang Jin-woo	
2006	Korea GT Championship	GT-2	Kwon Oh-soo	
2006	Korea GT Championship	Touring A	Ryu Si-won	
2006	Korea GT Championship	Touring B	Yoon Jae-young	
2006	Korea GT Championship	Formula 1800	Kim Joon-tae	
2007	CJ Superrace Championship	GT	Steven Cho	
2007	CJ Superrace Championship	Touring A	Oh Il-ki	
2007	CJ Superrace Championship	Touring B	Han Chi-woo	
2007	CJ Superrace Championship	Formula 1800	Kim Jong-kyum	
2008	CJ Superrace Championship	Super 6000	Steven Cho	
2008	CJ Superrace Championship	GT	Park Sang-moo	
2008	CJ Superrace Championship	Super 2000	Lee Jae-woo	
2008	CJ Superrace Championship	Super 1600	Kim Jin-pyo	
2009	CJ O Superrace Championship	Super 6000	Kim Eui-soo	
2009	CJ O Superrace Championship	Super 3800	Steven Cho	
2009	CJ O Superrace Championship	Super 2000	Lee Jae-woo	
2009	CJ O Superrace Championship	Super 1600	Park Si-hyun	
2010	CJ Tving.com Superrace Championship	Hello TV 6000 (Super 6000)	Taku Bamba	
2010	CJ Tving.com Superrace Championship	Genesis Coupe	Jang Soon-ho	
2010	CJ Tving.com Superrace Championship	Super 2000	Lee Jae-woo	
2010	CJ Tving.com Superrace Championship	NEXEN N9000	Jeong Hoe-won	
2011	CJ Tving.com Superrace Championship	Hello TV 6000 (Super 6000)	Kim Eui-soo	
2011	CJ Tving.com Superrace Championship	Genesis Coupe	Yoo Kyung-ouk	
2011	CJ Tving.com Superrace Championship	Super 2000	Lee Jae-woo	
2011	CJ Tving.com Superrace Championship	NEXEN N9000	Joo Jin-wan	
2012	CJ HELLO MOBILE Superrace Championship	Super 6000	Kim Eui-soo	
2012	CJ HELLO MOBILE Superrace Championship	ECSTA GT	Yoo Kyung-ouk	
2012	CJ HELLO MOBILE Superrace Championship	VENTUS	Kim Tea-ho	
2012	CJ HELLO MOBILE Superrace Championship	NEXEN N9000	Yoon Kwang-soo	
2013	CJ HELLO VISION Superrace Championship	Super 6000	Hwang Jin-woo	
2013	CJ HELLO VISION Superrace Championship	GT	Choi Hea-min	
2013	CJ HELLO VISION Superrace Championship	VENTUS	Kim Tea-ho	
2013	CJ HELLO VISION Superrace Championship	NEXEN N9000	Kim Hyo-kyum	
2014	CJ HELLO MOBILE Superrace Championship	Super 6000	Steven Cho	CJ Racing
2014	CJ HELLO MOBILE Superrace Championship	GT	Lee Jae-woo	
2014	CJ HELLO MOBILE Superrace Championship	Super 1600	Yang Yong-hyeok	
2014	CJ HELLO MOBILE Superrace Championship	ECSTA V720 Cruze	Kim Tea-ho	
2014	CJ HELLO MOBILE Superrace Championship	ECSTA V720 Accent	Choi Kwang-sung	
2015	CJ HELLO MOBILE Superrace Championship	Super 6000	Tim Bergmeister	ECSTA Racing
2015	CJ HELLO MOBILE Superrace Championship	GT	An Jae-mo	
2015	CJ HELLO MOBILE Superrace Championship	Super 1600	Kim Hyo-kyum	
2015	CJ HELLO MOBILE Superrace Championship	ECSTA V720 Cruze	Jeong Ju-seop	
2015	CJ HELLO MOBILE Superrace Championship	ECSTA V720 Accent	Won Sang-yeon	
2016	CJ Logistics Superrace Championship	SK ZIC 6000 (Super 6000)	Jung Eui-chul	ECSTA Racing
2016	CJ Logistics Superrace Championship	GT-1	Roelof Bruins	Seohan Purple Motorsport
2016	CJ Logistics Superrace Championship	GT-2	Han Min-kwan	
2016	CJ Logistics Superrace Championship	GT-3	Kim Dae-hyeok	
2016	CJ Logistics Superrace Championship	GT-4	Jung Seoung-chul	
2016	CJ Logistics Superrace Championship	Shell HELIX ULTRA 1600	Lee Jun-eun	
2016	CJ Logistics Superrace Championship	ECSTA V720 Cruze	Jeong Ji-won	
2016	CJ Logistics Superrace Championship	ECSTA V720 Accent	Lee Joong-hoon	
2017	CJ Logistics Superrace Championship	Cadillac 6000 (Super 6000)	Steven Cho	ATLASBX Motorsports
2017	CJ Logistics Superrace Championship	GT-1	Kim Jong-kyum	Seohan Purple-BLUE
2017	CJ Logistics Superrace Championship	GT-2	Lee Dong-ho	
2017	CJ Logistics Superrace Championship	GT-3	Kim Yang-ho	
2017	CJ Logistics Superrace Championship	GT-4	Yu Jun-seon	
2017	CJ Logistics Superrace Championship	Avante Cup Masters	Park Dong-sup	
2018	CJ Logistics Superrace Championship	Cadillac 6000 (Super 6000)	Kim Jong-kyum	ATLASBX Motorsports
2018	CJ Logistics Superrace Championship	ASA GT	Jung Kyung-hoon	BEAT R&D
2018	CJ Logistics Superrace Championship	BMW M	Hyeon Jae-bok	
2019	CJ Logistics Superrace Championship	ASA 6000 (Super 6000)	Kim Jong-kyum	ATLASBX Motorsports
2019	CJ Logistics Superrace Championship	GT-1	Jung Kyung-hoon	
2019	CJ Logistics Superrace Championship	GT-2	Bak Hee-chan	
2019	CJ Logistics Superrace Championship	BMW M	John Kwon	
2019	CJ Logistics Superrace Championship	Radical Cup Asia	Sohn In-yohn	
2019	CJ Logistics Superrace Championship	Mini Challenge Korea		
2019	CJ Logistics Superrace Championship	┗ Cooper JCW	Jo Han-cheol	
2019	CJ Logistics Superrace Championship	┗ Cooper S	Kim Hyeon-yi	
2019	CJ Logistics Superrace Championship	┗ Lady	Lee Ha-yoon	
2020	CJ Logistics Superrace Championship	Super 6000	Jung Eui-chul	ECSTA Racing
2020	CJ Logistics Superrace Championship	Kumho GT-1	Jung Kyung-hoon	
2020	CJ Logistics Superrace Championship	Kumho GT-2	Park Dong-sup	
2020	CJ Logistics Superrace Championship	BMW M	Kim Hyo-gyum	
2020	CJ Logistics Superrace Championship	Radical Cup Korea	Kim Hyun-jun	
2021	CJ Logistics Superrace Championship	Samsung Fire & Marine Insurance 6000 (Super 6000)	Kim Jong-kyum	ATLASBX Motorsports
2021	CJ Logistics Superrace Championship	Kumho GT-1	Jung Kyung-hoon	
2021	CJ Logistics Superrace Championship	Kumho GT-2	Kim Seong-hoon	
2021	CJ Logistics Superrace Championship	Cadillac CT4	Byun Jeong-ho	
2021	CJ Logistics Superrace Championship	Kolon Motors BMW M	John Kwon	
2021	CJ Logistics Superrace Championship	Radical Cup Korea	Kim Hyun-jun	
2022	CJ Logistics Superrace Championship	Samsung Fire & Marine Insurance 6000 (Super 6000)	Kim Jong-kyum	Hankook ATLASBX Motorsports
2022	CJ Logistics Superrace Championship	Kumho GT-1	Jung Kyung-hun	
2022	CJ Logistics Superrace Championship	Kumho GT-2	Park Jae-hong	
2022	CJ Logistics Superrace Championship	Cadillac CT4	Kim Moon-su	
2022	CJ Logistics Superrace Championship	BMW M Class	Han Sang-gyoo	
2022	CJ Logistics Superrace Championship	Sports Prototype (Radical) Cup Korea	Sabina Park	

== Online Racing Series (eSports) ==
=== 2020 CJ Logistics eSuperrace Series ===
The eSuperrace Series, an e-sports series focused on motor sports, is held by Superrace Co., Ltd., which hosts and supervises the Superrace Championship. The Superrace e-sports which began in 2020 under the name "2020 CJ Logistics e- Superrace" were conducted in a way that divided the rankings with a PC-based simulation racing game using racing gear.

30 regular league drivers were chosen in August 2020 by three online selections. They competed in a total of ten rounds of racing, with each round providing championship points depending on the standings to decide the regular league winner. In 2020, the first season of its launch, Kim Young-Chan, who ranked first in a total of six rounds, won the first place in the regular league. Following the regular league, the top 18 drivers were given the chance to compete in the Grand Final to determine the season's champion.

In addition to the regular league, 5 additional drivers were chosen to compete in the Grand Final through three wildcard play-offs. Throughout the season, "The Fastest" was held online to compete for the fastest lap time, and the winner also qualified for the Grand Final.

On 12 December 2020, three races were held in the Grand Finals. The final season champion is determined by adding the points awarded differently based on the race's ranking. Kim Gyu-min, who finished second in the regular league, was declared the 2020 season champion.

=== 2021 CJ Logistics eSuperrace Series ===
In contrast to the 2020 season, which was played as a single Division, the 2021 season will be separated into two normal seasons, the summer season, and the winter season. Also the 2020 season will be contested by individual competitions, but the 2021 season will be conducted by team competition. A total of 10 teams are expected to participate.

=== 2021 CJ Logistics eSuperrace Series Calendar (It is not yet officially announced) ===
- Summer League

Round	1	2	3	4	5	6	7	8
Date	18 July	25 July	1 August	8 August	15 August	29 August	12 September	26 September

- Winter League

Round	1	2	3	4	5	6	7	8
Date	5 December	12 December	19 December	26 December	2 January	9 January	16 January	23 January
