= 2022 Superrace Championship =

South Korean motor race series

The 2022 Superrace Championship (also known as the 2022 CJ Logistics Superrace Championship) is a South Korean motor racing series for stock cars, production cars and prototypes. It is the 17th season running for the championship and the 16th season both partnered by CJ Group and raced under the moniker Superrace Championship. The championship is contested individually between 5 classes; Super 6000, Kumho GT (GT1 & GT2), Cadillac CT4 Class, BMW M Class and Sports Prototype (Radical) Cup Korea.

== Calendar ==
2022 Superrace Championship Official Calendar
Round	Circuit	Dates
1	(South Korea) Everland Speedway	23–24 April
2	(South Korea) Korea International Circuit	21–22 May
3	(South Korea) Inje Speedium	11 June
4	(South Korea) Korea International Circuit	16–17 July
5	(South Korea) Inje Speedium	20–21 August
6	(South Korea) Korea International Circuit	1–2 October
7	(South Korea) Everland Speedway	22 October
8	(South Korea) Everland Speedway	23 October

== Teams and drivers ==
=== Super 6000 ===
Since 2020, all teams are currently using the Toyota GR Supra powered with a General Motors 6.2L LS3 V8 engine capable of producing 460 horsepower.

Key
Regular driver
Wildcard driver
Replacement driver

Team	No.	Driver(s)	Tyre	Rounds
ATLASBX Motorsports	01	(South Korea) Kim Jong-kyum	HK	All
ATLASBX Motorsports	08	(Netherlands) Roelof Bruins	HK	All
ATLASBX Motorsports	10	(Canada) Steven Cho	HK	All
Brand New Racing	87	(South Korea) Lee Hyo-jun	Y	2–8
CJ Logistics Racing	03	(South Korea) Jeong Yeon-il	KU	All
CJ Logistics Racing	88	(South Korea) Tom Mun Sung-hak	KU	All
ECSTA Racing	18	(South Korea) Lee Chan-joon	KU	All
ECSTA Racing	24	(South Korea) Lee Chang-uk	KU	All
ECSTA Racing	55	(South Korea) Lee Jung-woo	KU	All
JUN-FITTED Racing	50	(South Korea) Oh Han-sol	HK	1-6, 8
JUN-FITTED Racing	77	(South Korea) Park Jung-jun	HK	1-6
L&K Motors	22	(South Korea) Lee Eun-jung	KU	All
L&K Motors	94	(South Korea) Seo Ju-won	KU	All
N'Fera Racing	12	(South Korea) Hwang Jin-woo	NEX	All
N'Fera Racing	15	(South Korea) Hwang Do-yun	NEX	All
Seohan GP	05	(South Korea) Kim Joong-kun	NEX	All
Seohan GP	06	(South Korea) Jang Hyun-jin	NEX	All
Seohan GP	07	(South Korea) Jeong Hoe-won	NEX	All
SONIC Motorsports - ATLASBX	25	(South Korea) Yang Tae-keun	HK	All
VOLLGAS Motorsports	04	(South Korea) Jung Eui-chul	HK	All
VOLLGAS Motorsports	44	(South Korea) Kim Jae-hyun	HK	All

=== Kumho GT ===
Key
Regular driver
Wildcard driver
Replacement driver

Team	No.	Driver(s)	Tyre	Rounds
GT1
2K Body Racing Team	20	(South Korea) Yeon Sang-beom	KU	1–5
2K Body Racing Team	24	(South Korea) Lee Jung-jae	KU	1–5
2K Body Racing Team	55	(South Korea) Yoon Jeong-ho	KU	1–5
2K Body Racing Team	62	(South Korea) Jeong Byung-min	KU	1–5
2K Body Racing Team	87	(South Korea) Park Jae-hyun	KU	1–5
Beat R&D Racing	03	(South Korea) Jo Ik-seong	KU	1–5
Beat R&D Racing	06	(South Korea) Jung Won-hyung	KU	1–5
Beat R&D Racing	79	(South Korea) Nam Ki-moon	KU	1–5
BMP Performance	07	(South Korea) Kim Seong-hoon	KU	1–5
BMP Performance	95	(South Korea) Moon Se-eun	KU	1–5
Brand New Racing	22	(South Korea) Lee Hyo-jun	KU	1–5
Brand New Racing	36	(South Korea) Park Jun-seo	KU	1–5
Brand New Racing	38	(South Korea) Park Gyu-seung	KU	1–5
Brand New Racing	58	(South Korea) Na Yeon-woo	KU	1–5
Brand New Racing	61	(South Korea) Go Se-jun	KU	1–5
Brand New Racing	91	(South Korea) Lee Jae-jin	KU	1–5
E-rain Motorsport (Team Quadro E-rain Racing)	17	(South Korea) Park Jong-geun	KU	1–5
E-rain Motorsport (Team Quadro E-rain Racing)	18	(South Korea) Kim Hyo-gyeom	KU	1–5
E-rain Motorsport (Team Quadro E-rain Racing)	19	(South Korea) Kim Seong-hyun	KU	1–5
E-rain Motorsport (Team Quadro E-rain Racing)	69	(South Korea) Han Min-gwan	KU	1–5
GRIT Motorsport	51	(South Korea) Kang Min-jae	KU	1–5
GRIT Motorsport	66	(South Korea) Lee Chang-woo	KU	1–5
GRIT Motorsport	67	(South Korea) Cho Hoon-hyun	KU	1–5
Jun Motors Racing Team	27	(South Korea) Kim Young-chan	KU	1–5
JUN-FITTED Racing	21	(South Korea) Kim Hak-gyeom	KU	1–5
JUN-FITTED Racing	77	(South Korea) Jeon Jong-yeop	KU	1–5
JUN-FITTED Racing	88	(South Korea) Shin Soo-kyung	KU	1–5
L&K Motors	80	(South Korea) Lee Yong-tae	KU	1–5
MMX Motorsports	05	(South Korea) Park Seok-chan	KU	1–5
MMX Motorsports	27	(South Korea) Park Seo-in	KU	1–5
MMX Motorsports	90	(South Korea) Lee Dong-hwan	KU	1–5
ONE Racing	08	(South Korea) Lim Min-jin	KU	1–5
ONE Racing	09	(South Korea) Jang Dae-sung	KU	
ONE Racing	10	(South Korea) Song Young-kwang	KU	1–5
ProDL Racing	75	(South Korea) Seo Hyung-woon	KU	1–5
Seohan GP	01	(South Korea) Jung Kyung-hoon	KU	1–5
Seohan GP	98	(South Korea) Kang Jin-seong	KU	1–5
with Racing Motorsports Team	50	(South Korea) Je Seong-wook	KU	1–5
with Racing Motorsports Team	81	(South Korea) Park Dong-seop	KU	1–5
GT2
BMP Performance	46	(South Korea) Min Chung-sik	KU	1–5
BMP Performance	86	(South Korea) Kim Seong-hoon	KU	1–5
with Racing Motorsports Team	11	(South Korea) Park Jae-hong	KU	1–5
with Racing Motorsports Team	78	(South Korea) Kim Hyun-tae	KU	1–5

=== Cadillac CT4 ===
Key
Regular driver
Wildcard driver
Replacement driver

No.	Driver(s)	Tyre	Rounds
01	(South Korea) Byun Jeong-ho	NEX	1-5
07	(South Korea) Lee Young-min	NEX	1-5
10	(South Korea) Ham Seung-wan	NEX	1-3, 5
32	(South Korea) Yoo Jae-hyung	NEX	1-4
40	(South Korea) Park Hyun-jun	NEX	1-5
42	(South Korea) Lee Chang-hak	NEX	1-5
66	(South Korea) Lee Seok-woo	NEX	1-5
70	(South Korea) Kim Moon-su	NEX	1-5
76	(South Korea) Yoo Jae-hyung	NEX	1-4
81	(South Korea) Ra Deok-yeon	NEX	3
83	(South Korea) Kim Jae-ik	NEX	2-3
86	(South Korea) Jung In-seung	NEX	1, 3-5
91	(South Korea) Kim Dong-yun	NEX	3, 5

=== BMW M Class ===
Key
Regular driver
Wildcard driver
Replacement driver

No.	Driver(s)	Tyre	Rounds
02	(South Korea) Kim Hyun-soo	NEX	1-5
03	(Indonesia) Budiyanto Imam Suyanto	NEX	3-4
04	(South Korea) Won Jong-hyun	NEX	3-5
05	(South Korea) Song Ki-young	NEX	1-5
07	Phil Kim	NEX	1-5
08	(South Korea) Han Sang-kyu	NEX	1-5
09	Henri	NEX	5
10	Charles Teo	NEX	5
11	David Choi	NEX	3-5
17	(South Korea) Shin Dong-min	NEX	2
22	(South Korea) Park Chan-young	NEX	1-5
47	(South Korea) An Seung-hyeon	NEX	3
55	(South Korea) Han Chi-woo	NEX	1-5
66	(South Korea) Seo Hyun-min	NEX	3-5
69	(South Korea) Seon Hyung-jo	NEX	4-5
77	(South Korea) Kim Yeon-hwan	NEX	1, 3, 5
87	(South Korea) Kim Min-hyun	NEX	1-5
88	(South Korea) Choi Dong-min	NEX	1-5

=== Sports Prototype Cup Korea ===
Key
Regular driver
Wildcard driver
Replacement driver

No.	Driver(s)	Tyre	Rounds
03	(South Korea) Noh Seung-min	HK	1-3
07	(Indonesia) Alwin Cipto Ciputra	HK	5
09	Henri	HK	1, 4-5
10	(South Korea) Kim Don-young	HK	1-5
12	(South Korea) Sabina Park	HK	1-5
18	(South Korea) Kim Hwa-rang	HK	4
20	(South Korea) Shim Jae-eon	HK	4-5
21	(Singapore) Ni Weilang	HK	5
23	(United States) Adam Lazur	HK	4-5
24	(South Korea) Kim Ji-hun	HK	5
25	(South Korea) Seo Seung-wan	HK	1-5
31	(South Korea) Kim Taek-seong	HK	5
40	(South Korea) Choi Jung-taek	HK	1, 5
42	(South Korea) Lee Sang-jin	HK	2
44	(South Korea) Mike Eom Jae-woong	HK	1, 4-5
45	(South Korea) Choi Jang-han	HK	2-3
46	(South Korea) John Kwon	HK	4-5
49	(South Korea) Yoon Sang-hwi	HK	5
71	(South Korea) Kim Sang-ho	HK	1, 4-5
77	Jake Yoo	HK	1-5
84	(South Korea) Yu Chang-wook	HK	1-2
87	(South Korea) Kim Hyun-jun	HK	1-4
88	(South Korea) Choi Tae-yang	HK	5
90	(South Korea) Seo Joo-hyung	HK	3
93	(South Korea) Lee Young-jin	HK	1-3
99	(Singapore) Gerald Goh Eng Peng	HK	5

== Season summary ==
Round	Circuit	Pole position	Fastest lap	Winning driver	Winning team	Report
1	(South Korea) Everland Speedway 1	(South Korea) Kim Jong-kyum	(South Korea) Kim Jong-kyum	(South Korea) Kim Jong-kyum	ATLASBX Motorsports	Report
2	(South Korea) Korea International Circuit 1	(South Korea) Kim Jae-hyun	(South Korea) Kim Jae-hyun	(South Korea) Kim Jae-hyun	VOLLGAS Motorsports	Report
3	(South Korea) Inje Speedium 1	(Netherlands) Roelof Bruins	(South Korea) Lee Chang-uk	(Netherlands) Roelof Bruins	ATLASBX Motorsports	Report
4	(South Korea) Korea International Circuit 2	(South Korea) Jung Eui-chul	(South Korea) Jung Eui-chul	(South Korea) Jung Eui-chul	VOLLGAS Motorsports	Report
5	(South Korea) Inje Speedium 2	(Canada) Steven Cho	(Canada) Steven Cho	(Canada) Steven Cho	ATLASBX Motorsports	Report
6	(South Korea) Korea International Circuit 3	(South Korea) Lee Chang-uk	(South Korea) Jang Hyun-jin	(South Korea) Jang Hyun-jin	Seohan GP	Report
7	(South Korea) Everland Speedway 2&3	(South Korea) Jung Eui-chul	(South Korea) Jung Eui-chul	(South Korea) Lee Chan-joon	ECSTA Racing	Report
8	(South Korea) Everland Speedway 2&3	(South Korea) Kim Jae-hyun	(South Korea) Kim Jae-hyun	(South Korea) Kim Jae-hyun	VOLLGAS Motorsports	Report

== Championship standings ==
=== Drivers championships ===
==== Scoring system ====
Position	1st	2nd	3rd	4th	5th	6th	7th	8th	9th	10th	Race completion
Race	25	18	15	12	10	8	6	4	2	1	1
Qualifying	3	2	1								

==== Super 6000 ====
2022 Super 6000 Driver Standings
Rank	Driver	EVE1 (South Korea)	KOR1 (South Korea)	INJ1 (South Korea)	KOR2 (South Korea)	INJ2 (South Korea)	KOR3 (South Korea)	EVE2&3 (South Korea)		Points
1	(South Korea) Kim Jong-kyum	**1**^{1}	4	6	3	18	3	5	4	106
2	(South Korea) Kim Jae-hyun	Ret	**1**^{1}	10	2^{2}	2^{2}	Ret	15^{2}	**1**^{1}	105
3	(South Korea) Jang Hyun-jin	11	2	7	7	4	1^{2}	Ret	2	94
4	(South Korea) Lee Chan-joon	3	Ret	3	5	9	4	1^{3}	7	92
5	(Canada) Steven Cho	2^{3}	12	2^{2}	14	**1**^{1}	13	6	14	81
6	(South Korea) Jung Eui-chul	4	11	Ret^{3}	**1**^{1}	8	DSQ^{3}	4^{1}	Ret^{2}	73
7	(Netherlands) Roelof Bruins	18	14^{3}	**1**^{1}	4	5	Ret	7	5	72
8	(South Korea) Lee Chang-uk	6^{2}	16^{2}	4	19^{3}	13	**2**^{1}	3	9	70
9	(South Korea) Lee Jung-woo	13	9	5	8	3	5	2	Ret	66
10	(South Korea) Jeong Hoe-won	16	5	12	10	6	7	11	3	49
11	(South Korea) Kim Joong-kun	15	3	8	6	12	10	Ret	8	39
12	(South Korea) Hwang Jin-woo	10	8	16	11	11	6	8	6	35
13	(South Korea) Seo Ju-won	7	6	11	Ret	7	8	10	11	35
14	(South Korea) Oh Han-sol	5	Ret	Ret	9	Ret	Ret		Ret	14
15	(South Korea) Hwang Do-yun	12	7	Ret	12	10	Ret	9	Ret	14
16	(South Korea) Park Jung-jun	8	17	13	13	14	9			12
17	(South Korea) Tom Mun Sung-hak	9	10	9	20	Ret	Ret	12	10	11
18	(South Korea) Yang Tae-keun	14	13	15	16	17	11	13	12	8
19	(South Korea) Lee Eun-jung	17	18	17	18	19	12	14	15	8
20	(South Korea) Lee Hyo-jun		15	14	17	16	Ret	Ret	13	5
21	(South Korea) Jeong Yeon-il	Ret	Ret	Ret	15	15	Ret	Ret	Ret	2
Rank	Driver	EVE1 (South Korea)	KOR1 (South Korea)	INJ1 (South Korea)	KOR2 (South Korea)	INJ2 (South Korea)	KOR3 (South Korea)	EVE2&3 (South Korea)		Points

Key
Colour	Result
Gold	Winner
Silver	2nd place
Bronze	3rd place
Green	Other points position
Blue	Other classified position
Blue	Not classified, finished (NC)
Purple	Not classified, retired (Ret)
Red	Did not qualify (DNQ)
Red	Did not pre-qualify (DNPQ)
Black	Disqualified (DSQ)
White	Did not start (DNS)
White	Race cancelled (C)
Blank	Did not practice (DNP)
Blank	Excluded (EX)
Blank	Did not arrive (DNA)
Blank	Withdrawn (WD)
Annotation	Meaning
Superscript number^{123}	Points-scoring position in qualifying
**Bold**	Pole position
Italics	Fastest lap

=== Teams championships ===
==== Super 6000 ====
The teams championship is decided upon points scored by two drivers per team after each race. Teams with 3 or more drivers have 15 days before each race to select two drivers to add their points towards their final tally.

2022 Super 6000 Team Standings
Rank	Team	EVE1 (South Korea)	KOR1 (South Korea)	INJ1 (South Korea)	KOR2 (South Korea)	INJ2 (South Korea)	KOR3 (South Korea)	EVE2&3 (South Korea)		Points
1	ATLASBX Motorsports	**1**^{1}	12	**1**^{1}	3	**1**^{1}	3	5	4	185
1	ATLASBX Motorsports	18	14^{3}	2^{2}	14	18	Ret	6	5	185
2	VOLLGAS Motorsports	4	**1**^{1}	10	**1**^{1}	2^{2}	DSQ^{3}	4^{1}	**1**^{1}	178
2	VOLLGAS Motorsports	Ret	11	Ret^{3}	2^{2}	8	Ret	15^{2}	Ret^{2}	178
3	ECSTA Racing	3	9	3	8	3	**2**^{1}	1^{3}	9	158
3	ECSTA Racing	13	16^{2}	4	19^{3}	13	4	2	Ret	158
4	Seohan GP	11	2	8	6	4	1^{2}	11	2	133
4	Seohan GP	15	3	12	7	12	7	Ret	8	133
5	N'Fera Racing	10	7	16	11	10	6	8	6	49
5	N'Fera Racing	12	8	Ret	12	11	Ret	9	Ret	49
6	L&K Motors	7	6	11	18	7	8	10	11	43
6	L&K Motors	17	18	17	Ret	19	12	14	15	43
7	JUN-FITTED Racing	5	17	13	9	14	9		Ret	26
7	JUN-FITTED Racing	8	Ret	Ret	13	Ret	Ret			26
8	CJ Logistics Racing	9	10	9	15	15	Ret	12	10	13
8	CJ Logistics Racing	Ret	Ret	Ret	20	Ret	Ret	Ret	Ret	13
9	SONIC Motorsports-AtlasBX	14	13	15	16	17	11	13	12	8
10	Brand New Racing		15	14	17	16	Ret	Ret	13	5
Rank	Team	EVE1 (South Korea)	KOR1 (South Korea)	INJ1 (South Korea)	KOR2 (South Korea)	INJ2 (South Korea)	KOR3 (South Korea)	EVE2&3 (South Korea)		Points

Key
Colour	Result
Gold	Winner
Silver	2nd place
Bronze	3rd place
Green	Other points position
Blue	Other classified position
Blue	Not classified, finished (NC)
Purple	Not classified, retired (Ret)
Red	Did not qualify (DNQ)
Red	Did not pre-qualify (DNPQ)
Black	Disqualified (DSQ)
White	Did not start (DNS)
White	Race cancelled (C)
Blank	Did not practice (DNP)
Blank	Excluded (EX)
Blank	Did not arrive (DNA)
Blank	Withdrawn (WD)
Annotation	Meaning
Superscript number^{123}	Points-scoring position in qualifying
**Bold**	Pole position
Italics	Fastest lap

=== Tyre manufacturers championships ===
In 2022, Superrace announced a new championship for the tyre manufacturers for the Super 6000 class. Hankook, Kumho Tire and Nexen Tire will participate, along with 9 teams who currently use their tyres. Like the teams championship, the tyre manufacturers must select 5 drivers per tyre user 15 days before each round to add their points towards their final tally.

2022 Super 6000 Tyre Manufacturer Standings
Rank	Team	EVE1 (South Korea)	KOR1 (South Korea)	INJ1 (South Korea)	KOR2 (South Korea)	INJ2 (South Korea)	KOR3 (South Korea)	EVE2&3 (South Korea)		Points
1	(South Korea) Hankook	**1**^{1}	**1**^{1}	**1**^{1}	**1**^{1}	**1**^{1}	3	4^{1}	**1**^{1}	437
1	(South Korea) Hankook	2^{3}	4	2^{2}	2^{2}	2^{2}	DSQ^{3}	5	4	437
1	(South Korea) Hankook	4	11	6	3	5	13	6	5	437
1	(South Korea) Hankook	18	12	Ret^{3}	4	8	Ret	7	Ret^{2}	437
1	(South Korea) Hankook	Ret	14^{3}	10	14	18	Ret	15^{2}	14	437
2	(South Korea) Kumho	3	6	3	5	3	**2**^{1}	1^{3}	7	265
2	(South Korea) Kumho	6^{2}	9	4	8	7	4	2	9	265
2	(South Korea) Kumho	7	16^{2}	5	19^{3}	9	5	3	11	265
2	(South Korea) Kumho	13	Ret	11	15	13	8	10	Ret	265
2	(South Korea) Kumho	Ret	Ret	Ret	Ret	15	Ret	Ret	Ret	265
3	(South Korea) Nexen	10	2	7	6	4	1^{2}	6	2	231
3	(South Korea) Nexen	11	3	8	7	6	6	9	3	231
3	(South Korea) Nexen	12	5	12	10	10	7	11	6	231
3	(South Korea) Nexen	15	7	16	11	11	10	Ret	8	231
3	(South Korea) Nexen	16	8	Ret	12	12	Ret	Ret	Ret	231
Rank	Team	EVE1 (South Korea)	KOR1 (South Korea)	INJ1 (South Korea)	KOR2 (South Korea)	INJ2 (South Korea)	KOR3 (South Korea)	EVE2&3 (South Korea)		Points

Key
Colour	Result
Gold	Winner
Silver	2nd place
Bronze	3rd place
Green	Other points position
Blue	Other classified position
Blue	Not classified, finished (NC)
Purple	Not classified, retired (Ret)
Red	Did not qualify (DNQ)
Red	Did not pre-qualify (DNPQ)
Black	Disqualified (DSQ)
White	Did not start (DNS)
White	Race cancelled (C)
Blank	Did not practice (DNP)
Blank	Excluded (EX)
Blank	Did not arrive (DNA)
Blank	Withdrawn (WD)
Annotation	Meaning
Superscript number^{123}	Points-scoring position in qualifying
**Bold**	Pole position
Italics	Fastest lap
