= 2021 Superrace Championship =

South Korean motor race series

The 2021 Superrace Championship (commercially known as the 2021 CJ Logistics Superrace Championship) was a South Korean motor racing series for stock cars, production cars and prototypes. It was the 16th season running for the championship and the 15th season both partnered by CJ Group and raced under the moniker Superrace Championship. The championship was contested individually between 5 classes; Super 6000, Kumho GT, Cadillac CT4 Class, Kolon Motors (BMW) M Class & Radical Cup Korea.

== Calendar ==
2021 Superrace Championship Official Calendar
Round	Circuit	Dates
1	(South Korea) Everland Speedway	16 May
2	(South Korea) Inje Speedium	10 July
3	(South Korea) Inje Speedium	5 September
4	(South Korea) Korea International Circuit	24 October
5	(South Korea) Everland Speedway	6 November
6	(South Korea) Everland Speedway	7 November
7	(South Korea) Korea International Circuit	20 November
8	(South Korea) Korea International Circuit	21 November

=== Mid-season calendar changes ===
The 3rd round of the championship held at Korea International Circuit was postponed due to the Korean government announcing measures to prevent COVID-19 from spreading across the country. As a result, the revised calendar included a double-header hosted at Korea International Circuit at the end of the season taking place on the 20th and 21st of November. The 3rd round took place at Inje Speedium, which also held the annual Gangwon International Motor Festa. The event was also held without spectators and with on-site quarantine in accordance with the government's plans to strengthen social distancing.

== Teams and drivers ==
=== Samsung Fire & Marine Insurance 6000 ===
Since 2020, all teams are currently using the Toyota GR Supra powered with a General Motors 6.2L LS3 V8 engine capable of producing 460 horsepower.

Key
Regular driver
Wildcard driver
Replacement driver

Team	No.	Driver(s)	Tyre	Rounds
ASA & JUN-FITTED Racing Team	12	(South Korea) Hwang Jin-woo	N	All
ASA & JUN-FITTED Racing Team	77	(South Korea) Park Jung-jun	N	All
ATLASBX Motorsports	08	(Netherlands) Roelof Bruins	H	All
ATLASBX Motorsports	09	(South Korea) Kim Jong-kyum	H	All
ATLASBX Motorsports	10	(Canada) Steven Cho	H	All
CJ Logistics Racing	63	(South Korea) Choi Gwang-bin	K	2-8
CJ Logistics Racing	88	(South Korea) Tom Mun Sung-hak	K	All
ECSTA Racing	01	(South Korea) Jung Eui-chul	K	All
ECSTA Racing	02	(South Korea) Noh Dong-gi	K	All
ECSTA Racing	03	(South Korea) Lee Jung-woo	K	All
L&K Motors	04	(South Korea) Kim Dong-eun	N	2-8
L&K Motors	22	(South Korea) Lee Eun-jung	N	All
LOAR Racing	66	(South Korea) Lee Chan-joon	K	All
LOAR Racing	94	(South Korea) Seo Ju-won	K	1-2
MIDAS Racing - ATLASBX	99	(South Korea) Seo Seok-hyun	H	All
N'Fera Racing	16	(South Korea) Hwang Do-yun	N	3-8
ONE Racing	13	(South Korea) Lim Min-jin	K	6
ONE Racing	32	(South Korea) Jang Hyun-wook	K	5
ONE Racing	91	(South Korea) Kwon Jae-in	K	1, 3-4, 7-8
Purple Motorsport	11	(South Korea) Oh Il-ki	K	All
Seohan GP	06	(South Korea) Jang Hyun-jin	H	All
Seohan GP	07	(South Korea) Jeong Hoe-won	H	2-8
Seohan GP	83	(South Korea) Kim Joong-kun	H	All
ULSAN x DR Motorsport	80	(South Korea) Ha Tae-young	N	2-8
VOLLGAS Motorsports	95	(South Korea) Kim Jae-hyun	H	All

=== Mid-season changes ===
On August 26, series tire supplier Nexen Tire announced the arrival of a new racing team. Named 'N'Fera Racing', the team held a launch ceremony in Seoul and confirmed that they will debut at the 3rd round of the championship held at Inje Speedium, selecting Hwang Do-yun as their driver.

On November 5, ONE Racing announced that its main driver, Kwon Jae-in, will not contest the 5th and 6th rounds held at Everland Speedway for personal reasons. As a result, Kumho GT1 drivers Jang Hyun-wook and Lim Min-jin replaced him for the weekend and raced the car on the 5th and 6th rounds respectively.

=== Kumho GT ===
Key
Regular driver
Wildcard driver
Replacement driver

Team	No.	Driver(s)	Tyre	Rounds
GT1
2K Body Racing Team	09	(South Korea) Lee Jung-jae	K	5-7
2K Body Racing Team	12	(South Korea) Kim Young-seok	K	
2K Body Racing Team	20	(South Korea) Yeon Sang-beom	K	All
2K Body Racing Team	53	(South Korea) Jeong Byung-min	K	1, 3-7
2K Body Racing Team	87	(South Korea) Park Byung-hwan	K	1, 3-4
2K Body Racing Team	94	(South Korea) Choi Dong-seop	K	1
ASA & JUN-FITTED Racing Team	25	(South Korea) Park Jun-seo	K	All
ASA & JUN-FITTED Racing Team	77	(South Korea) Shin Chan	K	1, 3-7
ASA & JUN-FITTED Racing Team	95	(South Korea) Park Seong-hyun	K	1, 3-6
Beat R&D	02	(South Korea) Baek Cheol-yong	K	1
Beat R&D	03	(South Korea) Jo Ik-seong	K	All
Beat R&D	04	(South Korea) Kim Ji-won	K	All
Beat R&D	05	(South Korea) Lee Jae-jin	K	1, 3-7
Beat R&D	06	(South Korea) Jeong Won-hyeong	K	All
Beat R&D	66	(South Korea) Yoon Jeong-ho	K	3-6
Beat R&D	96	(South Korea) Park Jun-seong	K	2-7
Brand New Racing	22	(South Korea) Lee Hyo-jun	K	1-6
Brand New Racing	38	(South Korea) Park Gyu-seung	K	All
Brand New Racing	79	(South Korea) Park Jun-eun	K	All
GRIT Motorsport	50	(South Korea) Lee Chang-woo	K	1-4, 7
GRIT Motorsport	51	(South Korea) Park Won-jae	K	1-2, 7
Huibas Motorsport	27	(South Korea) Jeon Jong-ki	K	1
Huibas Motorsport	97	(South Korea) Charlie Lee	K	
kmsa Motorsport	34	(South Korea) Choi Jeong-won	K	3-6
L&K Motors	80	(South Korea) Lee Yong-tae	K	1-4
LUXON	44	(South Korea) Kang Min-jae	K	1, 3, 5-6
MIDAS Racing	07	(South Korea) Kim Moo-jin	K	All
MIDAS Racing	18	(South Korea) Lee Won-il	K	All
MIDAS Racing	21	(South Korea) Kim Hak-gyeom	K	All
MIDAS Racing	48	(South Korea) Yang Sang-guk	K	1-5, 7
MIDAS Racing	73	(South Korea) Kim Min-sang	K	All
MIDAS Racing DCT	23	(South Korea) Kim Gyu-min	K	All
MIDAS Racing DCT	88	(South Korea) Kim Young-chan	K	All
ONE Racing	10	(South Korea) Song Young-kwang	K	All
ONE Racing	13	(South Korea) Lim Min-jin	K	All
ONE Racing	27	(South Korea) Jeon Jong-ki	K	2
Purple Motorsport	12	(South Korea) Lim Ji-wan	K	1
Purple Motorsport	24	(South Korea) Lee Chang-wook	K	All
Quadro E-Rain Racing Team	19	(South Korea) Kim Seong-hyun	K	All
Quadro E-Rain Racing Team	69	(South Korea) Han Min-gwan	K	1, 3-7
Seohan GP	01	(South Korea) Jung Kyung-hoon	K	All
Seohan GP	98	(South Korea) Kang Jin-seong	K	All
TEAM106	72	(South Korea) Ryu Si-won	K	All
VOLLGAS Motorsports	99	(South Korea) Jung Soo-hyuk	K	1-4
with Racing Motorsports Team	11	(South Korea) Park Dong-seop	K	2-7
with Racing Motorsports Team	49	(South Korea) Je Seong-wook	K	2-7
GT2
2K Body	86	(South Korea) Kim Seong-hoon	K	All
Busan Institute of Science and Technology Racing Team	55	(South Korea) Jung Yong-pyo	K	2-3
GRIT Motorsport	52	(South Korea) Do Young-joo	K	All
Stormer Racing	84	(South Korea) So Soon-ik	K	2-6
ULSAN x DR Motorsport	74	(South Korea) Hong Seong-jae	K	1, 3-7
Ulsan Toba	37	(South Korea) Park Kyu-byeong	K	3-4, 7
with Racing Motorsports Team	75	(South Korea) Park Jae-hong	K	All
with Racing Motorsports Team	78	(South Korea) Kim Hyun-tae	K	All

=== Cadillac CT4 ===
Key
Regular driver
Wildcard driver
Replacement driver

Team	No.	Driver(s)	Tyre	Rounds
Cadillac CT4	22	(South Korea) Lee Jun-woo	N	1
Cadillac CT4	40	(South Korea) Park Hyun-jun	N	All
Cadillac CT4	66	(South Korea) Lee Seok-woo	N	All
Dream Racer	07	(South Korea) Lee Young-min	N	All
Dream Racer	32	(South Korea) Yoo Jae-hyung	N	All
Dream Racer	70	(South Korea) Kim Moon-soo	N	All
Dream Racer	76	(South Korea) Shin Il-kyung	N	All
Dream Racer	91	(South Korea) Jung Kyung-hoon	N	All
RAON Racing	01	(South Korea) Ham Seung-wan	N	All
RAON Racing	86	(South Korea) Jeong In-seung	N	2-5
Team E.S Racing	11	(South Korea) Lee Sol-yong	N	1
The A Motors	77	(South Korea) Byun Jeong-ho	N	All
VOLLGAS Motorsports	83	(South Korea) Kim Jae-ik	N	All

=== Kolon Motors BMW M ===
Key
Regular driver
Wildcard driver
Replacement driver

Team	No.	Driver(s)	Tyre	Rounds
Dorrautomotive	02	(South Korea) Phil Kim	N	All
Giant Factory	04	(South Korea) Kim Hyo-gyeom	N	3-5
Giant Factory	07	(South Korea) Song Deok-sam	N	All
Giant Factory	37	(South Korea) Lee Sang-cheol	N	All
Giant Factory	44	(South Korea) Hong Chan-ho	N	1, 3-5
Giant Factory	66	(South Korea) Park Chan-yeong	N	1, 3, 5
Giant Factory	86	(South Korea) Song Hyeong-jin	N	2-4
Giant Factory	99	(South Korea) Kim Ji-hoon	N	
MIDAS Racing	11	(South Korea) Ryu Seong-yeol	N	1-2, 4-5
M.I.M. Racing	03	(South Korea) Charles	N	
M.I.M. Racing	22	(South Korea) Park Chan-young	N	All
Team M.C.K. (M Club Korea)	88	(South Korea) Choi Min	N	All
TOM n TOMs Racing	01	(South Korea) Kwon Hyung-jin	N	All
TOM n TOMs Racing	09	(South Korea) Henry	N	All
TOM n TOMs Racing	10	(South Korea) Kim Jae-woo	N	
ULSAN x DR Motorsport	50	(South Korea) Park Hee-chan	N	3-5
ULSAN x DR Motorsport	55	(South Korea) Ken Kim	N	1-2
V8 Racing	08	(South Korea) Han Sang-gyu	N	All
V8 Racing	87	(South Korea) Kim Min-hyun	N	3-5

== Season summary ==
Round	Circuit	Pole position	Fastest lap	Winning driver	Winning team	Report
1	(South Korea) Everland Speedway 1	(South Korea) Noh Dong-gi	(South Korea) Hwang Jin-woo	(South Korea) Hwang Jin-woo	ASA & JUN-FITTED Racing Team	Report
2	(South Korea) Inje Speedium 1&2	(South Korea) Kim Jong-kyum	(South Korea) Kim Jong-kyum	(South Korea) Kim Jong-kyum	ATLASBX Motorsports	Report
3	(South Korea) Inje Speedium 1&2	(Canada) Steven Cho	(South Korea) Kim Joong-kun	(Canada) Steven Cho	ATLASBX Motorsports	Report
4	(South Korea) Korea International Circuit 1	(South Korea) Jang Hyun-jin	(South Korea) Jang Hyun-jin	(South Korea) Jang Hyun-jin	Seohan GP	Report
5	(South Korea) Everland Speedway 2&3	(South Korea) Noh Dong-gi	(South Korea) Noh Dong-gi	(South Korea) Noh Dong-gi	ECSTA Racing	Report
6	(South Korea) Everland Speedway 2&3	(South Korea) Jang Hyun-jin	(South Korea) Kim Joong-kun	(South Korea) Jung Eui-chul	ECSTA Racing	Report
7	(South Korea) Korea International Circuit 2&3	(South Korea) Choi Gwang-bin	(South Korea) Noh Dong-gi	(South Korea) Choi Gwang-bin	CJ Logistics Racing	Report
8	(South Korea) Korea International Circuit 2&3	(South Korea) Noh Dong-gi	(South Korea) Lee Chan-joon	(Canada) Steven Cho	ATLASBX Motorsports	Report

== Championship standings ==
=== Drivers championships ===
==== Scoring system ====
Position	1st	2nd	3rd	4th	5th	6th	7th	8th	9th	10th	Race completion
Race	25	18	15	12	10	8	6	4	2	1	1
Qualifying	3	2	1								

==== Super 6000 ====
Kim Jong-kyum won the Super 6000 title for the third time in his career, after winning back-to-back titles in 2018 and 2019.

2021 Super 6000 Driver Standings
Rank	Driver	EVE1 (South Korea)	INJ1&2 (South Korea)		KIC1 (South Korea)	EVE2&3 (South Korea)		KIC2&3 (South Korea)		Points
1	(South Korea) Kim Jong-kyum	9	**1**^{1}	2^{3}	13	8	3	7	2	103
2	(Netherlands) Roelof Bruins	7	6	4	3	7	4	2	7	91
3	(South Korea) Noh Dong-gi	**5**^{1}	3	7	8	**1**^{1}	9	5	**13**^{1}	88
4	(Canada) Steven Cho	15	Ret^{2}	**1**^{1}	Ret	5^{2}	14	6	1	82
5	(South Korea) Lee Chan-joon	3	Ret	6	14	4	2	11	6^{2}	77
6	(South Korea) Kim Jae-hyun	10	Ret^{3}	9	2	2	7	3	9	70
7	(South Korea) Kim Joong-kun	13	7	3	5^{2}	6	6^{3}	Ret	4	68
8	(South Korea) Jang Hyun-jin	12	15	16^{2}	**1**^{1}	13	**Ret**^{1}	4	3	66
9	(South Korea) Lee Jung-woo	4	5	11	17	3	5	**14**^{1}	11	59
10	(South Korea) Jeong Hoe-won		2	5	4	Ret	12	16	5	57
11	(South Korea) Jung Eui-chul	2^{2}	Ret	17	19^{3}	9^{3}	1^{2}	19	Ret	50
12	(South Korea) Hwang Jin-woo	1^{3}	8	14	7	11	10	13	8	49
13	(South Korea) Choi Gwang-bin		12	12	6	Ret	17	1^{2}	Ret	41
14	(South Korea) Oh Il-ki	6	4	Ret	10	14	8	10	Ret†	33
15	(South Korea) Tom Mun Sung-hak	9	Ret	10	15	12	11	9	12	17
16	(South Korea) Hwang Do-yun			Ret	11	10	13	8	10	11
17	(South Korea) Kim Dong-eun		13	8	12	15	15	21	Ret	11
18	(South Korea) Park Jung-jun	11	10	13	9	16	16	15	14	11
19	(South Korea) Seo Seok-hyun	14	14	15	18	18	19	17	16	8
20	(South Korea) Lee Eun-jung	16	17	19	21	19	21	20	17	8
21	(South Korea) Ha Tae-young		16	18	20	20	18	18	15	7
22	(South Korea) Kwon Jae-in	Ret		Ret	16			12	Ret	3
23	(South Korea) Seo Ju-won	Ret	11							1
24	(South Korea) Jang Hyun-wook					17				1
25	(South Korea) Lim Min-jin						20			1
Rank	Driver	EVE1 (South Korea)	INJ1&2 (South Korea)		KIC1 (South Korea)	EVE2&3 (South Korea)		KIC2&3 (South Korea)		Points

Key
Colour	Result
Gold	Winner
Silver	2nd place
Bronze	3rd place
Green	Other points position
Blue	Other classified position
Blue	Not classified, finished (NC)
Purple	Not classified, retired (Ret)
Red	Did not qualify (DNQ)
Red	Did not pre-qualify (DNPQ)
Black	Disqualified (DSQ)
White	Did not start (DNS)
White	Race cancelled (C)
Blank	Did not practice (DNP)
Blank	Excluded (EX)
Blank	Did not arrive (DNA)
Blank	Withdrawn (WD)
Annotation	Meaning
Superscript number^{123}	Points-scoring position in qualifying
**Bold**	Pole position
Italics	Fastest lap

Notes:

- † – Driver did not finish the round, but was classified as they completed more than 75% of the race distance.

=== Teams championships ===
==== Super 6000 ====
The teams championship is decided upon points scored by two drivers per team after each race. Teams with 3 or more drivers have 15 days before each race to select two drivers to add their points towards their final tally.

AtlasBX Motorsports won the teams' championship to add to the three titles they won in 2017, 2018 and 2019.

2021 Super 6000 Team Standings
Rank	Team	EVE1 (South Korea)	INJ1&2 (South Korea)		KIC1 (South Korea)	EVE2&3 (South Korea)		KIC2&3 (South Korea)		Points
1	ATLASBX Motorsports	7	**1**^{1}	**1**^{1}	3	5^{2}	3	2	2	199
1	ATLASBX Motorsports	9	6	4	Ret	7	14	7	7	199
2	ECSTA Racing	2^{2}	5	11	8	**1**^{1}	1^{2}	5	11	136
2	ECSTA Racing	**5**^{1}	Ret	17	19^{3}	9^{3}	5	19	**13**^{1}	136
3	Seohan GP	12	7	3	**1**^{1}	6	6	4	3	134
3	Seohan GP	13	15	16^{2}	4	Ret	**Ret**^{1}	16	4	134
4	LOAR Racing	3	11	6	14	4	2	11	6^{2}	78
4	LOAR Racing	Ret	Ret							78
5	VOLLGAS Motorsports	10	Ret^{3}	9	2	2	7	3	9	70
6	ASA & JUN-FITTED Racing Team	1^{3}	8	13	7	11	10	13	8	60
6	ASA & JUN-FITTED Racing Team	11	10	14	9	16	16	15	14	60
7	CJ Logistics Racing	9	12	10	6	12	11	1^{2}	12	58
7	CJ Logistics Racing		Ret	12	15	Ret	17	9	Ret	58
8	Purple Motorsport	6	4	Ret	10	14	8	10	Ret†	33
9	L&K Motors	16	13	8	12	15	15	20	17	19
9	L&K Motors		17	19	21	19	21	21	Ret	19
10	N'Fera Racing			Ret	11	10	13	8	10	11
11	MIDAS Racing - ATLASBX	14	14	15	18	18	19	17	16	8
12	ULSAN x DR Motorsport		16	18	20	20	18	18	15	7
13	ONE Racing	Ret		Ret	16	17	20	12	Ret	5
Rank	Team	EVE1 (South Korea)	INJ1&2 (South Korea)		KIC1 (South Korea)	EVE2&3 (South Korea)		KIC2&3 (South Korea)		Points

Key
Colour	Result
Gold	Winner
Silver	2nd place
Bronze	3rd place
Green	Other points position
Blue	Other classified position
Blue	Not classified, finished (NC)
Purple	Not classified, retired (Ret)
Red	Did not qualify (DNQ)
Red	Did not pre-qualify (DNPQ)
Black	Disqualified (DSQ)
White	Did not start (DNS)
White	Race cancelled (C)
Blank	Did not practice (DNP)
Blank	Excluded (EX)
Blank	Did not arrive (DNA)
Blank	Withdrawn (WD)
Annotation	Meaning
Superscript number^{123}	Points-scoring position in qualifying
**Bold**	Pole position
Italics	Fastest lap

Notes:

- † – Driver did not finish the round, but was classified as they completed more than 75% of the race distance.
