= Mun Sung-hak =

South Korean racing driver (born 1990)

Sung-Hak Mun
- Nationality: South Korean
- Born: July 28, 1990 (age 36) South Korea

FIA Formula Two Championship career
- Debut season: 2011
- Current team: MotorSport Vision
- Car number: 30
- Starts: 6
- Wins: 0
- Poles: 0
- Fastest laps: 0

Previous series
- 2007 2007-08 2008 2010: Formula Renault 2.0 UK BARC; Formula Renault 2.0 UK Winter Series; Formula Renault 2.0 UK; Formula BMW Pacific

"Tom" Mun Sung-hak (Korean: 문성학; born 28 July 1990) is a South Korean racing driver who most recently competed in the Korean Superrace Championship for CJ Logistics Racing. He was the first and only South Korean driver to compete in the FIA Formula Two Championship.

== Racing record ==
=== Career summary ===
Season	Series	Team	Races	Wins	Poles	F/Laps	Podiums	Points	Position
2007	Formula Renault 2.0 UK BARC	Eurotek Motorsport	11	0	0	0	1	34	9th
2007	Formula Renault 2.0 UK Winter Series	Eurotek Motorsport	4	0	0	0	0	26	18th
2008	Formula Renault 2.0 UK	Apotex Scorpio Motorsport	16	0	0	0	0	68	21st
2008	Formula Renault 2.0 UK Winter Series	Manor Competition	4	0	0	0	0	16	20th
2010	Formula BMW Pacific	E-Rain Racing	15	0	0	0	1	49	10th
2011	FIA Formula Two Championship	MotorSport Vision	15	0	0	0	0	0	26th
2020	Superrace Championship - Super 6000	CJ Logistics Racing	8	0	0	0	0	9	18th
2021	Superrace Championship - Super 6000	CJ Logistics Racing	8	0	0	0	0	17	15th
2022	Superrace Championship - Super 6000	CJ Logistics Racing	8	0	0	0	0	11	17th

* Season still in progress

=== Complete FIA Formula Two Championship results ===
(key) (Races in bold indicate pole position) (Races in italics indicate fastest lap)

Year	1	2	3	4	5	6	7	8	9	10	11	12	13	14	15	16	Pos	Points
2011	SIL; 1; 20	SIL; 2; 19	MAG; 1; 19	MAG; 2; 19	SPA; 1 Ret	SPA; 2; 17	NÜR; 1; 19	NÜR; 2 Ret	BRH; 1; 14	BRH; 2; 16	SPL; 1; 13	SPL; 2; 19	MNZ; 1 Ret	MNZ; 2; 12	CAT; 1 Ret	CAT; 2 DNS	26th	0
