= CABI =

CABI (in various spellings) is an abbreviation that may refer to:

- Centre for Agriculture and Bioscience International (CABI, sometimes also referred to as CAB International), a UK-based nonprofit inter-governmental organisation for scientific research and publishing on agriculture and the environment
- CaBI, the California Birth Index database
- CaBi, a common nickname for Capital Bikeshare

Cabi may also refer to:

- Câbi, an official in the Ottoman Empire
- "Cabi Song", a promotional single by Girls' Generation & 2PM
