= Caribbean Bay =

Water park in Yongin, South Korea

Coordinates: 37°17′49.00″N 127°12′02.00″E

Caribbean Bay 캐리비안 베이
- Interactive map of Caribbean Bay 캐리비안 베이
- Location: Indoor/outdoor, Everland Resort, Yongin, South Korea
- Opened: 1996
- Area: 152,058.74 m^{2}

Caribbean Bay is an indoor/outdoor water park located in Yongin, South Korea, on the outskirts of Seoul. Opened in 1996, Caribbean Bay is part of the Everland Resort, but it requires a separate admission fee.

With the opening in 2008 of its newest attraction, the "Wild River Zone", Caribbean Bay expanded its capacity by 30%. The park includes a wave pool, the world's Longest Lazy river Ride, a Sandy Pool, a Wading Pool for young children, Various Water Slides, and a Salt Sauna.

Caribbean Bay has received "Must-see Waterpark Awards" from International Association of Amusement Park Attractions.

== Facilities ==
=== Aquatic Center ===
The Aquatic Center is an Indoor Waterpark zone in Caribbean Bay. It has several pools including a Wave Pool and Diving Pool. It also has 3 watertube Slides. Its indoor location means it is open all year. It also operates a beauty zone, sauna, hot springs like jjimjilbangs in South Korea. The main facilities are: Spa & Sauna, Indoor Wave Pool, Quick Rider (indoor tube & water slide).

=== Sea Wave ===
The Sea Wave is famous for its large outside wave pool. It generates 2.4m artificial waves. It is the highest wave pool (tied with Ocean World V) in South Korea. The main facilities are: Wave Pool, Diving Pool, Wave Village, Sandy rest zone.

=== Wave Pool ===
The Wave Pool generates gigantic waves that reach up to 2.5 meters. That is why every person has to wear life jackets inside the yellow line. The wave comes regularly in 90 seconds. Also, a tube is unavailable in the Sea Wave. It is because when the tide retreats, a tube can be swept away in the torrent wave or be turned over.

=== Bay Slide ===
Bay slide zone is for water slides. It has 6 tube slides and 3 water bobsleighs. The main facilities are: Tube Ride, Water Bobsleigh, Bobsleigh Village.

=== Mega Storm ===
The Mega Storm is an extra-large water slide in the Caribbean Bay, that opened in 2015. Only those who are 120cm tall or more can ride. It is because the attraction can be used in a round tube and the tube spins down the slide from 37m in the air to the ground. Also, in the last part, the tube plummets into the funnel-looking tornado that is 18 diameters. Furthermore, everyone who rides it can enjoy it for 55~60 seconds.

=== Fortress ===
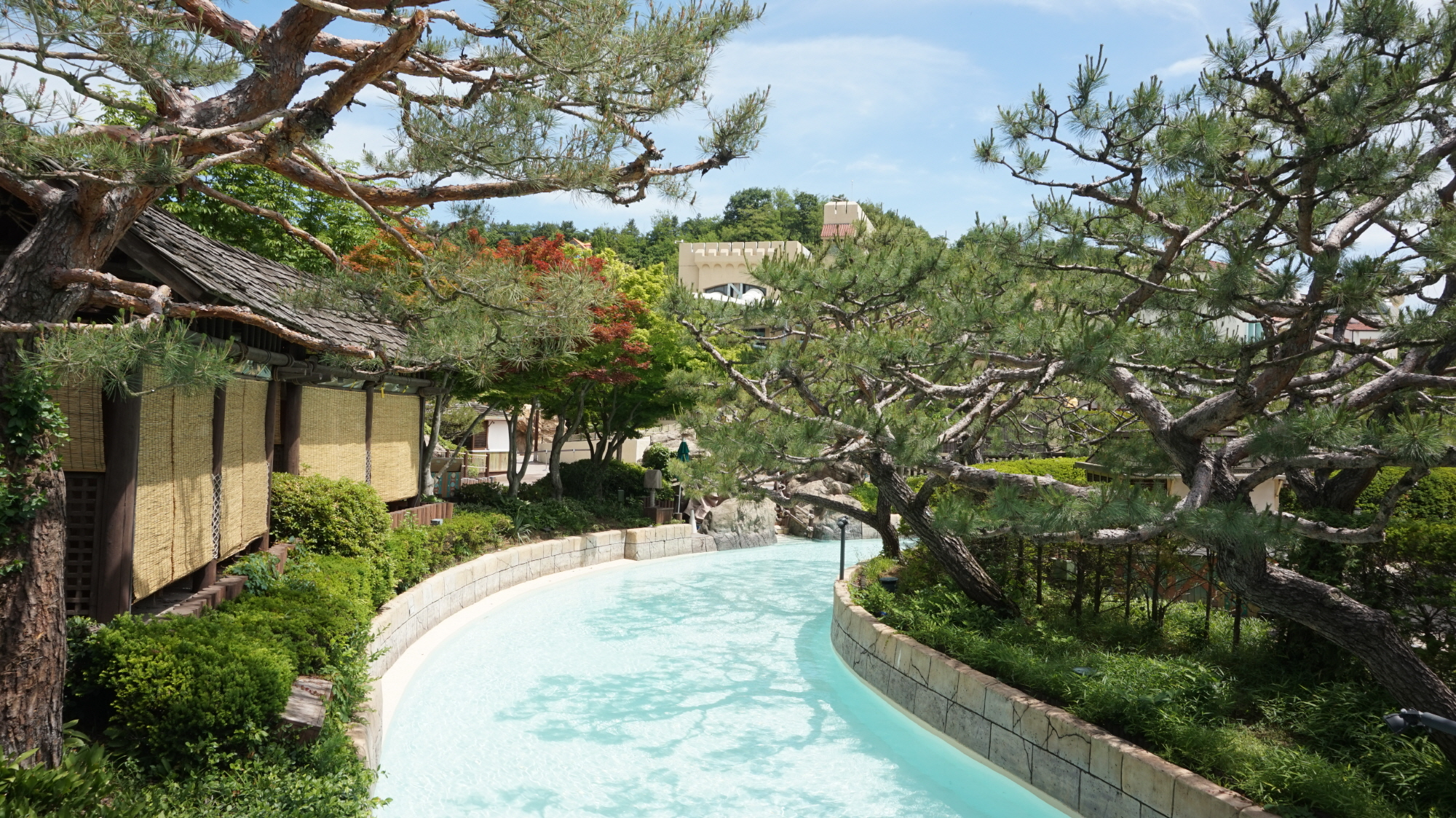
Lazy Pool

Fortress is for fun water play it has world's longest streaming pool (at the construction time) called "Lazy Pool". Adventure pool splashes 2.4 ton of water at once. The main facilities are: Flowing Water Pool, Surfing Ride, Adventure Pool.

=== Wild River ===
The Wild River (opened in 2008) is an extreme water play zone. It has 5 tube slides, 1 Boomerango. Wild Blaster is flume ride-like tube slide but more extreme and wet. Tower Raft is large tube slide track that 4 people can ride at once. Tower Boomerango is one of the most extreme water attraction in South Korea waterparks. Tubes slide down a 90-degree slope. The main facilities are: Tower Boomerango, Tower Raft, Wild Blaster, San Juan Restaurant.

== See also ==
- Everland, a theme park and the other main entertainment sector of Everland Resort
- "Cabi Song", a 2010 promotional single by Girls' Generation and 2PM for Caribbean Bay
- List of water parks
