= Cabi Song =

2010 single by Girls' Generation and 2PM

Single by Girls' Generation and 2PM
- Released: May 20, 2010
- Recorded: 2010
- Genre: K-pop; Dance-pop
- Length: 3:12
- Label: Cheil Worldwide
- Songwriters: Shinsadong Tiger; Choi Kyu-sung
- Producers: Shinsadong Tiger; Choi Kyu-sung

Music video
- "Cabi Song" on YouTube "Cabi Song (censored version)" on YouTube

"Cabi Song" (Korean: 캐비송) is a Korean song by South Korean girl group Girls' Generation and boy band 2PM, released under Cheil Worldwide and distributed by Loen Entertainment on May 20, 2010. Created to promote Everland Resort's water park Caribbean Bay, it is a notable early example of two K-pop groups from different record labels collaborating on a music release. It also contributed to shipping between members of the two idol groups.

== Background ==
"Cabi Song" is a dance-pop song composed and written by Lee Ho-yang, better known as Shinsadong Tiger, and Choi Kyu-sung. The lyrics of the song focus on a passionate summer romance. Although the song is credited under Girls' Generation and 2PM, it is only performed by Girls' Generation members Taeyeon, Jessica, Tiffany, and Seohyun and 2PM members Jun. K, Nichkhun, Taecyeon, and Chansung.

Prior to the release of the song, South Korean groups 2PM and Girls' Generation had appeared on variety shows together and collaborated on dance performances for end-of-the-year music show broadcasts such as the MBC Gayo Daejejeon. However, this project marked their first time collaborating on an CF and a music release.

"Cabi Song" was created as part of a 2010 "advertising war" between three of South Korea's major water parks: Everland Resort's Caribbean Bay, Daemyung Resort's Ocean World, and Huracle Resort's newly opened Tedin Water Park. After Ocean World's advertising campaign with K-pop idol Lee Hyori in 2008 coincided with a 30% increase in visitors, quickly threatening pioneer Caribbean Bay, each water park selected new idols as advertising models. Ocean World chose After School members Kahi and Uee, while Tedin Water Park chose girl group T-ara. On April 30, 2010, Everland Resort announced Girls' Generation and 2PM as their advertising models due to their domestic popularity and history, with Girls' Generation recently transitioning into a "sexy" image for their single "Run Devil Run", and 2PM being well known for their muscular and taller statures compared to other K-pop boy groups of the time.

== Release and music video ==
A teaser for Girls' Generation and 2PM's CFs was released on May 7, 2010 with the tagline "Who is the hottest cabi?", quickly drawing attention for the idols' revealing swimsuits showcasing their physiques. Prior to the broadcasting of shorter television advertisements, "Cabi Song" and its full music video were released online on May 20, 2010.

Described as a Korean version of Baywatch, the music video was directed by Cha Eun-taek and stars Girls' Generation members Yoona, Yuri, and Seohyun and 2PM members Taecyeon, Nichkhun, and Chansung as lifeguards at Caribbean Bay. The storyline of the music video focuses on each lifeguard training to become the best and "hottest", while three romantic couples and love triangles gradually begin to form. The music video also showcases each member enjoying the water park rides present at Caribbean Bay, such as a water slide, and dancing at nighttime by the pool to showcase the park's "club party atmosphere". The final scenes of dancing by the pool features cameo appearances by the other Girls' Generation and 2PM members.

== Reception ==
The song and music video were generally positively received, although most feedback was focused on the visuals of the video. For example, many complimented the Girls' Generation and 2PM members' "sexy charisma" and showcasing of romantic tension. More risqué and revealing scenes, such as ones of the members changing into their lifeguard uniforms, received particular attention. Some of these scenes, including one in which Nichkhun applies oil to Yuri's body, were criticized for "obscenity". As a result, a censored version of the music video with these criticized scenes being replaced by less provocative ones was released on May 26.

Some viewed the song as an exploitative attempt by Caribbean Bay to capitalize on both groups' popularity and fandoms, with a negative reception of the song's "musicality". Even so, the song still charted for five weeks on the Gaon Digital Chart, peaking at number 35.

== Aftermath ==
Caribbean Bay won the advertising war, holding onto its position as the most visited Korean water park and being ranked the fourth best water park globally by the Themed Entertainment Association in 2010. Girls' Generation and 2PM continued their roles as advertising models for Caribbean Bay that summer, as 2PM performed in the park's concerts and Girls' Generation held a fan-signing event in the park in July. 2PM would re-sign as advertising models for Everland and Caribbean Bay in the following years, with f(x) member Victoria Song in 2011 following her popular coupling with Nichkhun on the variety show We Got Married, and with labelmate and Miss A member Bae Suzy in 2012. However, Caribbean Bay was ultimately outperformed by Ocean World in 2011 and 2012.

"Cabi Song" also contributed to netizens shipping Girls' Generation and 2PM members, particularly the music video's leads, Yoona and Taecyeon. The two previously had dating rumors due to prior collaborations between Girls' Generation and 2PM, which continued when both were cast for the variety show Family Outing 2. This trend would continue to pop up throughout both groups' careers, especially when news of Girls' Generation member Tiffany and 2PM member Nichkhun dating went public in 2014. Dating rumors continued even as both groups' members began focusing on individual careers, particularly when members from each group began co-starring in Korean dramas.

== Charts ==
Chart (2010)	Peak position
South Korea (Gaon)	35

== See also ==
- "Lollipop", a 2009 promotional single by BigBang and 2NE1 for LG Cyon
- Trouble Maker, a South Korean co-ed duo composed of Beast's Jang Hyun-seung and 4minute's Hyuna, known for their sexually provocative discography
- SM Station, a music project in which SM Entertainment releases digital singles weekly, including collaborations with artists outside of SM Entertainment
