= Récardo Bruins Choi =

Dutch racing driver (born 1985)

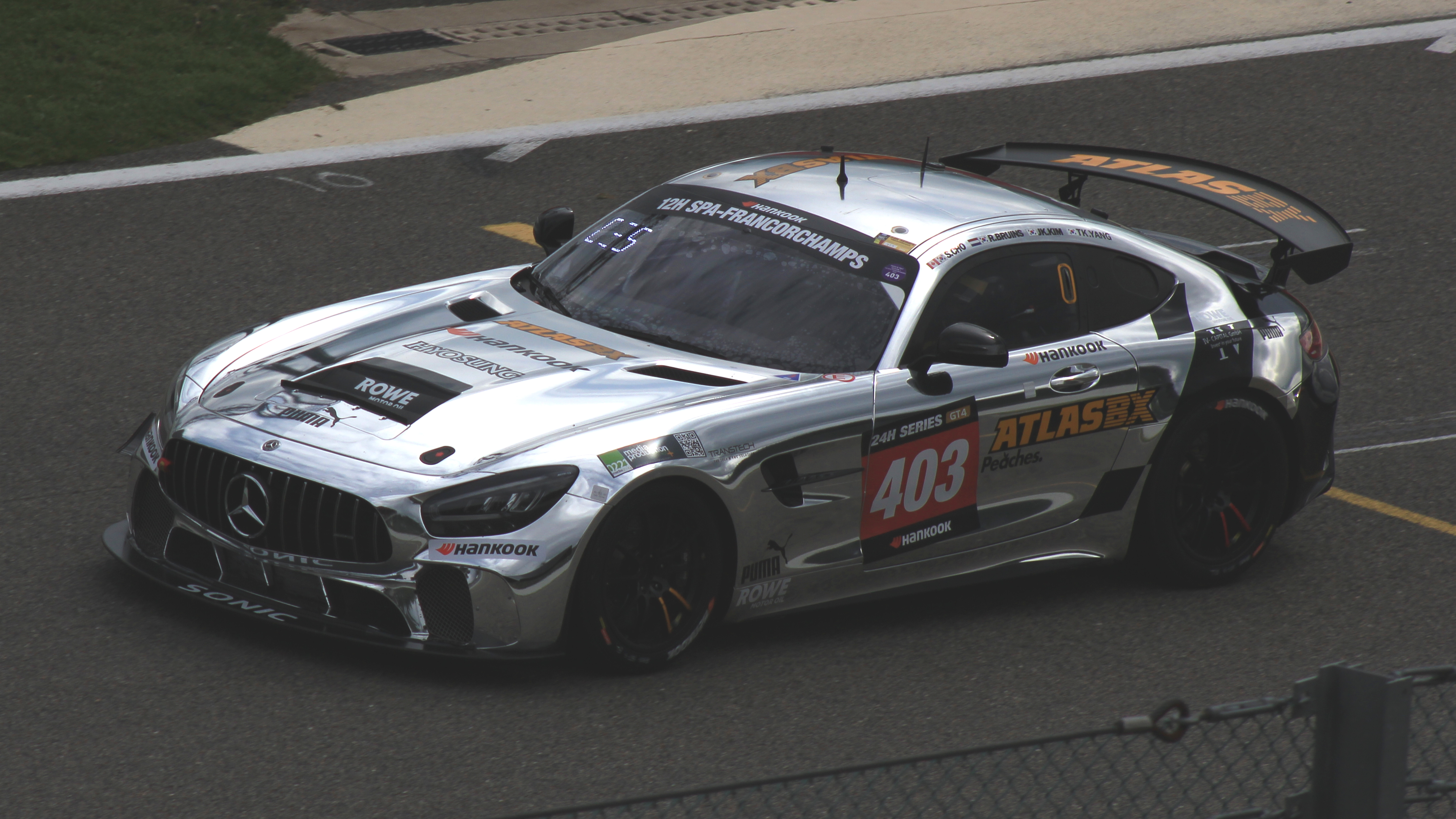
- Nationality: (Netherlands) Dutch (South Korea) South Korean
- Born: Choi Myung-gil; 3 December 1985 (age 40) Seoul, South Korea

24H GT Series career
- Categorisation: FIA Silver

- Korean name
- Hangul: 최명길
- Hanja: 崔明吉
- RR: Choe Myeonggil
- MR: Ch'oe Myŏnggil

Récardo Bruins Choi (born Choi Myung-gil; 3 December 1985, in Seoul, South Korea), later known as Roelof Bruins, is a South Korean-born Dutch professional racecar driver who currently competes in the Nürburgring Langstrecken-Serie for Hankook Competition.

== Youth ==
Born in Seoul, Choi was adopted by a Dutch family and arrived in the Netherlands at four months of age. He grew up as Récardo Bruins in the village of Zwartemeer near Emmen, where he started to drive mini go-karts at the age of five. After his first learning years, practicing the basics of racing, he made the step to the karting competition races and drove his first races in the mini class for children from 8 to 12 years of age. This ended very well and in his first seasons of racing Bruins earned numerous of titles and prizes.

== Career ==
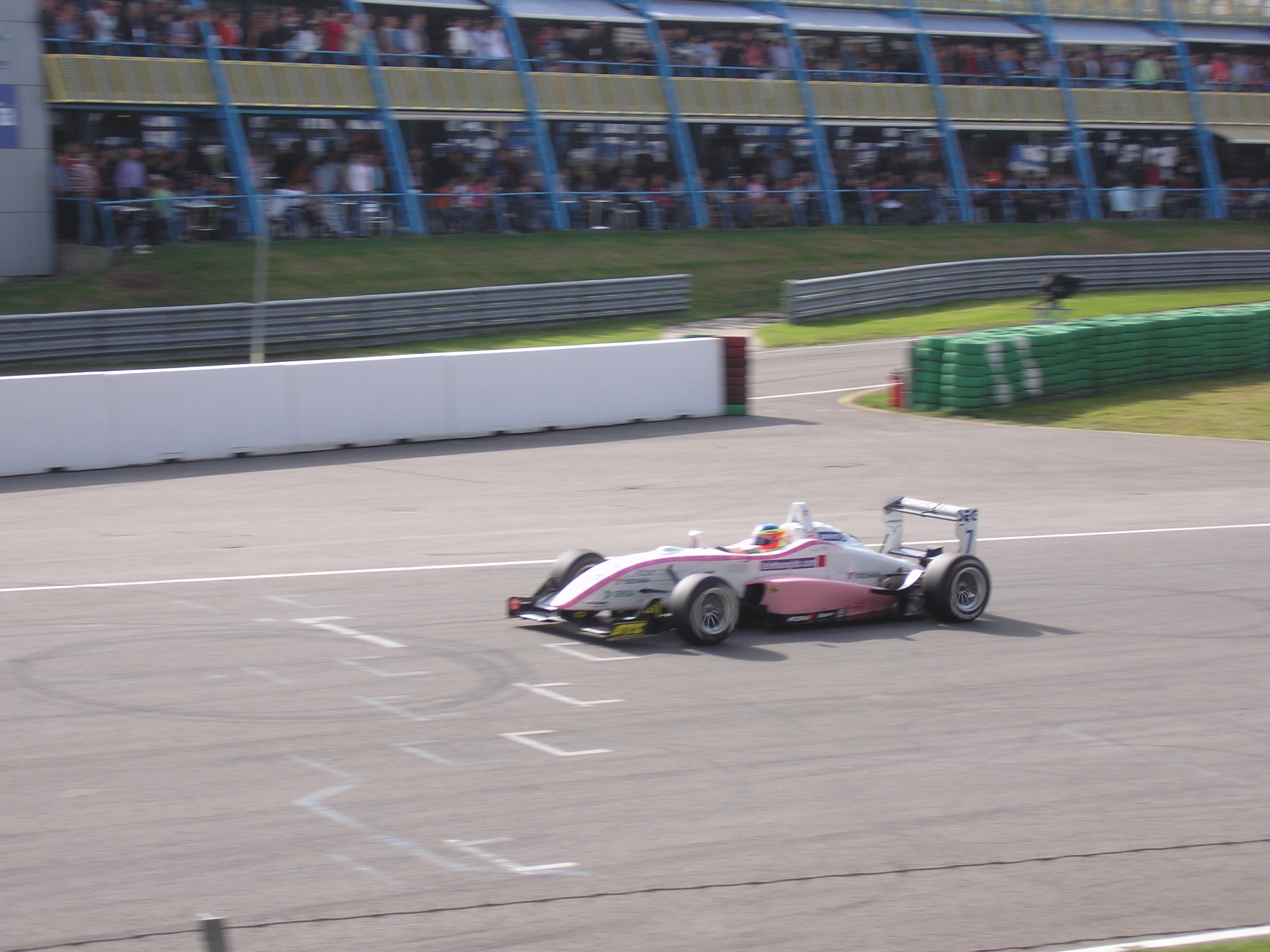
Bruins racing at TT Circuit Assen in the German Formula Three Championship.

After this, Choi made the step to the junior class in which he also raced on international circuits. In his second year he received the title of national champion and later that year he stepped up to Intercontinental A class, the highest karting class in the Netherlands at the time. Proving to be quick, Bruins in his first year was already a competitor for the national title but due to a mechanic failure he eventually finished second in the championship and had to wait a year to win the title of national champion. After his major successes in his karting career, Bruins made the switch to formula racing in 2004. At the most important race of the season, the Marlboro masters, Bruins proved his worth by scoring a pole position, the official track record and a podium finish. After this success more podium finishes followed and at the end of the season Bruins managed a third place in the overall ranking of the Dutch Formula Renault 2.0 series. In 2006, he stepped up to Formula Three racing, in the much faster and highly competitive German Formula Three Championship. Proving to be a quick learner, the Korean driver showed his speed by achieving podium finishes and promising results in his Formula Three debut season. In 2007, Choi continued his career in another season of German Formula Three Championship, getting two pole positions, two wins and several podium finishes. He finished fourth in the overall standings.

In 2008, Choi was going to focus on getting a seat in the GP2 Series, although nothing came to fruition.

== Racing record ==
=== Career summary ===
| Season | Series | Team | Races | Wins | Poles | F/Laps | Podiums | Points | Position |
|---|---|---|---|---|---|---|---|---|---|
| 2004 | Formula Renault 2000 Netherlands | Orange Motorsports | ? | 0 | 0 | 0 | 0 | 63 | 10th |
| 2005 | Formula Renault 2.0 Netherlands | Van Amersfoort Racing | 12 | 0 | 1 | 0 | 5 | 133 | 3rd |
| 2005 | Formula Renault 2.0 Germany | Van Amersfoort Racing | 10 | 1 | 1 | 3 | 2 | 146 | 11th |
| 2005 | Formula Renault 2.0 Nordic | Van Amersfoort Racing | 2 | 0 | 0 | 0 | 1 | 20 | 10th |
| 2006 | German Formula 3 Championship | Van Amersfoort Racing | 17 | 0 | 0 | 1 | 2 | 38 | 7th |
| 2006 | Formula 3 Euro Series | Van Amersfoort Racing | 2 | 0 | 0 | 0 | 0 | 0 | 27th |
| 2006 | Masters of Formula 3 | Van Amersfoort Racing | 1 | 0 | 0 | 0 | 0 | N/A | 31st |
| 2007 | German Formula 3 Championship | Van Amersfoort Racing | 18 | 2 | 2 | 2 | 6 | 95 | 4th |
| 2008 | Formula V6 Asia Championship | Team E-Rain | 4 | 0 | 0 | 0 | 0 | 14 | 10th |
| 2013 | Porsche Carrera Cup Asia | Team Carrera Cup Asia | 2 | 0 | 0 | 0 | 0 | 0 | NC† |
| 2015 | Porsche Carrera Cup Asia | Team Porsche Korea | 2 | 0 | 0 | 1 | 2 | 32 | 15th |
| 2016 | TCR Asia Series | Viper Niza Racing | 2 | 1 | 0 | 0 | 2 | 41 | 6th |
| 2017 | China GT Championship - GT4 | | ? | ? | ? | ? | ? | ? | 1st |
| 2018 | Blancpain GT Series Asia - GT3 | Indigo Racing | 12 | 0 | 0 | 0 | 2 | 30 | 20th |
| 2019 | Blancpain GT World Challenge Asia - GT3 | Solite Indigo Racing | 12 | 3 | 1 | 0 | 4 | 159 | 1st |
| 2019 | FIA GT World Cup | Solite Indigo Racing | 1 | 0 | 0 | 0 | 0 | N/A | 11th |
| 2021 | Superrace Championship - Super 6000 | AtlasBX Motorsports | 8 | 0 | 0 | 0 | 2 | 91 | 2nd |
| 2022 | 24H GT Series - GT4 | AtlasBX Motorsports | 1 | 0 | 0 | 0 | 0 | ? | ? |
| 2022 | Superrace Championship - Super 6000 | AtlasBX Motorsports | 8 | 1 | 1 | 0 | 1 | 72 | 7th |
| 2023 | 24H GT Series - GT4 | AtlasBX Motorsports | 5 | 4 | | | 4 | 200 | 1st |
| 2024 | 24H Series - 992 | Hankook Competition | | | | | | | |
| 2024 | Nürburgring Langstrecken-Serie - SP-X | Hankook Competition | | | | | | | |
| 2024 | 24 Hours of Nürburgring - SPX | Hankook Competition | | | | | | | |
| 2025 | Nürburgring Langstrecken-Serie - SP9 | Hankook Competition | | | | | | | |
| 2025 | 24 Hours of Nürburgring - SP9 Pro-Am | Hankook Competition | 1 | 0 | 0 | 0 | 0 | N/A | 4th |
| 2026 | Nürburgring Langstrecken-Serie - SP9 | Hankook Competition | | | | | | | |
| 2026 | 24 Hours of Nürburgring - SP9 Pro-Am | Hankook Competition | 1 | 0 | 0 | 0 | 0 | N/A | 4th |
