= Ocean World (water park) =

Water park in Hongcheon, South Korea

Vivaldi Ocean World / 비발디 파크 오션월드
- Location: Hongcheon, South Korea
- Coordinates: 37.6485°N 127.6857°E

Ocean World is a water park in Hongcheon County, Gangwon Province, South Korea. Opened in 2009, it forms a part of the larger Vivaldi Resort.

The park has an Ancient Egyptian theme. It claims to be the most popular water park in South Korea, and the 2nd in Asia overall.
