= Kang Min-jae =

South Korean racing driver

- Born: August 6, 1985 (age 41) Seoul, South Korea

- Kang Min-jae
- Hangul: 강민재
- Hanja: 姜旼材
- RR: Gang Minjae
- MR: Kang Minjae

Kang Min-jae (Korean: 강민재, born 6 August 1985 in Seoul) is a South Korean racing driver. He tested a Formula 3 car with the German team Mücke Motorsport in 2011 at the Hockenheimring.

== Racing career ==
He started his racing career in 2001. He won the kartvil kart challenge championship in 2004. He certificated Suzuka Circuit Racing School - Formula Basic Course in 2004 and Formula Toyota Racing School (FTRS) in 2006, Japan. From 2007 to 2009, he fulfilled his military duty. In 2011, he won the Johnnie Walker Keep Walking Fund 2011 in Korea and prepared for his F3 test drive in October.

On 12 December 2011, his documentary about the F3 test drive was aired by Korean broadcast station, MBC.
