= Everland Resort =

Theme park and resort in Yongin, South Korea

Coordinates: 37°17′45″N 127°12′10″E

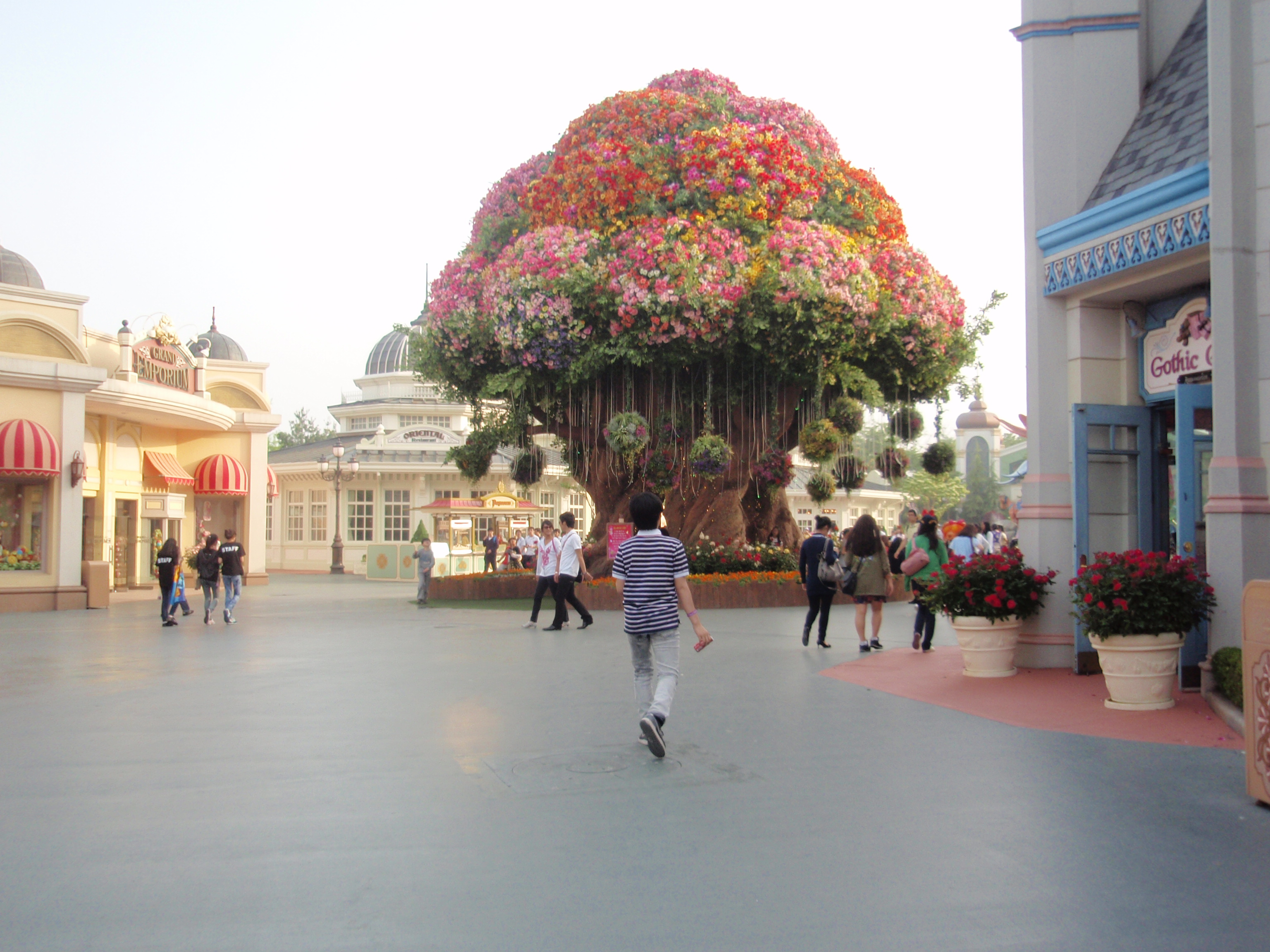
- Resort entrance, 2024
- Interactive map of Everland Resort
- Location: Yongin, Gyeonggi-do, South Korea
- Opened: April 1976
- Owner: Samsung Everland
- Website: www.everland.com

Everland Resort (Korean: 에버랜드 리조트) is a theme park and vacation resort located in Yongin, Gyeonggi-do, South Korea. It is owned and operated by Samsung Everland. The resort opened in April 1976 as a single theme park (Everland), and has developed into a resort with a water park (Caribbean Bay), hostels, museums, a golf course and a motorsport track.

== Areas ==
=== Everland ===
Everland is the main area of the park, which includes a zoo, amusement rides, a fantasy land and recreations of all continents.

=== Caribbean Bay ===
Caribbean Bay is South Korea's largest (2010) water park. The outdoor zone is not open all year due to weather conditions (Winter and Rainy Seasons). The aquatic center(inside) opens all year. It is divided into 5 distinct zones.

==== Wild River ====
Wild River (opened in summer 2008) is a zone for more advanced water play. It has 6 water tube slides including the Tower Bumerango.

==== Sea Wave ====
Main attraction in the Sea Wave zone is the Wave Pool. It generates 2.4 metres (7 ft 10 in) artificial waves. It also has a sandy rest zone.

==== Aquatic Center ====
Aquatic Center is an indoor zone in Caribbean Bay. It has several regular pools, 3 water slides, indoor wave pool, spas, and saunas. It is open all year.

==== Fortress ====
Fortress is a water-themed ride. It has streaming pool (called "Lazy Pool"), a Surfing Ride, an Adventure pool and spas.

==== Bay Slide ====
Bay Slide is a water ride located within the park. It has 6 tube rides and 3 water bobsleighs.

=== Everland Speedway ===
Everland Speedway is South Korea's first racing track. The speedway has held racing events of various scales. It also gives opportunities to experience and enjoy race car driving for ordinary people with no previous racing experience. //edit// 2361/wireshark/

=== Home Bridge ===
Home Bridge is a hostel at Everland Resort.

=== Glen Rose ===
Glen Rose is a golf course at Everland Resort.

== Event ==
Everland will host the tulip festival from April 16 to April 29, marking the beginning of the nation's flower festival with warm spring. The tulip festival period is also extended until 9 p.m. every night.

== See also ==
- "Cabi Song", a 2010 promotional single by Girls' Generation and 2PM for Everland Resort's Caribbean Bay
