= CJ Logistics =

South Korean logistics company

CJ Logistics Corporation
- Native name: 씨제이대한통운 주식회사
- Formerly: Korea Express; CJ Korea Express
- Type: Subsidiary
- Traded as: KRX: 000120
- Industry: Courier
- Founded: 1930; 96 years ago
- Headquarters: Seoul, South Korea
- Key people: Kang Sin-ho (CEO)
- Parent: CJ Group
- Website: www.cjlogistics.com

CJ Logistics Corporation (Korean: 씨제이대한통운 주식회사; Hanja: CJ大韓通運 株式會社; RR: CJ Daehan Tongun Jusik Hoesa) is a logistics company headquartered in Seoul, South Korea. It is the oldest and largest parcel delivery firm in South Korea.

== History ==
=== Korea Express ===
Korea Express was established as Chosun Rice Warehousing in 1930. It became a subsidiary of Dong-ah Group in 1968, but the creditors sold Korea Express when Dong-ah entered a government-sponsored debt workout program in 2003.

In 2008, a consortium led by Kumho Asiana Group was selected as the preferred bidder to buy Korea Express. Kumho Asiana, a South Korean conglomerate that operated Asiana Airlines, acquired Korea Express for 4.1 trillion won (US$ 4.34 billion) to expand its cargo business into the inland transportation business.

=== CJ Logistics ===
However, Kumho Asiana had to sell Korea Express as it faced a severe cash shortage during the 2008 financial crisis. After competing with the Samsung SDS-POSCO consortium, CJ Group acquired a 40 percent stake in Korea Express for 1.91 trillion won. CJ changed the company name to CJ Korea Express and merged with its existing logistics affiliate CJ GLS. In 2017, the company was rebranded as CJ Logistics from CJ Korea Express.
