= Kokoro Sato =

Japanese racing driver (born 2004)

- Nationality: (Japan) Japanese
- Born: 3 April 2008 (age 18) Hyōgo Prefecture, Japan

Kokoro Sato (佐藤 こころ, Satō Kokoro; born 4 March 2008) is a Japanese racing driver who last competed in Kyojo Cup for Team Optimus Cerumo・Inging.

== Career ==
=== Karting (2013–2023) ===
Sato began karting in 2013. Starting out in micro karts, Sato won the 2015 SL Takarazuka Series in the Kids class, before clinching the SL Kobe Series title in Micro Max the following year. Sato then moved to cadet karts, most notably winning the SL Ikoma title in 2018, as well as finishing runner-up in the JAF-sanctioned Junior Kart West Region Championship in 2019. Moving to junior karts in 2020, Sato became the first female to win a race in the All-Japan Junior Karting Championship as she finished third in the West Region standings, before securing runner-up honours the following year. In her final two years in karting, Sato raced in the FP-3 category in 2022, before most notably taking fifth in the FS-125 JAF standings of the All-Japan Karting Championship the following year.

=== Kyojo Cup and endurance debut (2024–present) ===
In 2024, Sato made her Kyojo Cup debut as a Privateer at the age of 16, taking a best result of 17th twice. With the series moving on from the Vita-01 to field the KC-MG01 F4 car for 2025, Sato continued in the series, joining series newcomers Cerumo・INGING alongside Riona Tomishita. Starting off the season with her maiden series podium in the round one's feature race, Sato then finished no lower than sixth in the remaining four rounds, as she took her only other podium of the season in round four, en route to a fourth-place points finish.

At the start of 2026, Sato made her endurance racing debut at the Dubai 24 Hour for Rookie Racing in the TCX class alongside Miki Onaga, Rio Shimono, Aimi Saito and Rami Sasaki. For the rest of the year, Sato returned to Cerumo・INGING for her third campaign in Kyojo Cup. Sato began the season with three podiums in the first four rounds, before scoring her first career win in round for and taking three additional podiums to secure runner-up honours overall. In September, Sato took part in F1 Academy's rookie test at Navarra.

== Karting record ==
=== Karting career summary ===
Season	Series	Team	Position
2013	SL Takarazuka Series – Kids Freshman		
2014	SL Kobe Series – Kids		2nd
2014	SL Takarazuka Series – Kids		4th
2015	Kids & Junior Kart Race National Championship	Team Nagao	2nd
2015	SL Kobe Series – Kids	RTK Orange Juice with Nagao	2nd
2015	SL Ikoma Series – Kids		4th
2015	SL Takarazuka Series – Kids		1st
2016	SL Kobe Series – Micro Max	Team Nagao	1st
2016	RMC Japan Final – Micro Max	Team Nagao	4th
2017	SL Kobe Series – Cadet Open	Team Nagao	6th
2018	SL Kobe Series – Cadet Open		3rd
2018	SL Ikoma Series – Cadet Open		1st
2018	All-Japan Junior Karting Championship – FP-Jr Cadets	Team Nagao	21st
2018	Junior Kart West Region Championship – FP-Jr Cadets	Team Nagao	10th
2019	All-Japan Junior Karting Championship – FP-Jr Cadets	Energy Japan	5th
2019	Junior Kart West Region Championship – FP-Jr Cadets	Energy Japan	2nd
2019	SL Kobe Series – Cadet Open		2nd
2019	SL Biwako Series – Cadet Open	Team Nagao	9th
2019	Toyopet SL Kart Meeting – Cadet Open	Team Nagao	DNS
2020	All-Japan Junior Karting Championship – FP-Jr	Team Nagao	9th
2020	Junior Kart West Region Championship – FP-Jr	Team Nagao	3rd
2020	SL Kobe Series – SS	Team Nagao	3rd
2021	All-Japan Karting Championship – FP-Jr	Team Nagao	6th
2021	All-Japan Karting West Region Championship – FP-Jr	Team Nagao	2nd
2021	Kart Race in Suzuka – Yamaha SS	Team Nagao	21st
2022	All-Japan Karting Championship – FP-3	Team Nagao	14th
2022	All-Japan Karting West Region Championship – FP-3	Team Nagao	5th
2023	All-Japan Karting Championship – FS-125 JAF	Team Nagao	5th

== Racing record ==
=== Racing career summary ===
Season	Series	Team	Races	Wins	Poles	F/Laps	Podiums	Points	Position
2024	Kyojo Cup	Kokoro Sato	6	0	0	0	0	0	NC
2025	Kyojo Cup	Optimus Cerumo・INGING	10	0	0	0	2	57	4th
2025–26	24H Series Middle East – TCX	Toyota Gazoo Rookie Racing	1	0	0	0	1	54	NC
2026	Kyojo Cup	Team Optimus Cerumo・INGING	10	1	0	0	7	89	**2nd**

=== Complete Kyojo Cup results ===
(key) (Races in bold indicate pole position) (Races in italics indicate fastest lap)

Year	Entrant	1	2	3	4	5	6	7	8	9	10	Pos	Points
2024	Privateer	FUJ1; 17	FUJ2; 1; 23	FUJ2; 2 Ret	FUJ3; 20	FUJ4; 17	NC; 1; 8	NC; 2; 9	FUJ5; 22			NC	0
2025	Optimus Cerumo・INGING	FUJ1; SPR; 4	FUJ1; FIN; 3	FUJ2; SPR; 4	FUJ2; FIN; 6	FUJ3; SPR; 6	FUJ3; FIN; 5	FUJ4; SPR; 3	FUJ4; FIN; 5	FUJ5; SPR; 5	FUJ5; FIN; 5	4th	57
2026	Team Optimus Cerumo・INGING	FUJ1; SPR; 3	FUJ1; FIN; 6	FUJ2; SPR; 3	FUJ2; FIN; 3	FUJ3; SPR; 6	FUJ3; FIN; 7	FUJ4; SPR; 2^{3}	FUJ4; FIN; 1	FUJ5; SPR; 2^{2}	FUJ5; FIN; 2	2nd	89
