= Rami Sasaki =

Japanese racing driver (born 2004)

- Nationality: (Japan) Japanese
- Born: 10 May 2004 (age 22) Tokyo, Japan

Rami Sasaki (佐々木 藍咲, Sasaki Rami; born 10 May 2004) is a Japanese racing driver who last competed in Kyojo Cup for Nat Team KCMG.

== Career ==
Sasaki began playing volleyball competitively in her early years as a team captain, and began karting in 2019, during test periods in which volleyball club activities were suspended. After racing sporadically in the CA Kart Race until 2022, Sasaki began competing in the RMC APG Series in 2023, most notably racing in the Max Lights Kyojo category, where she finished runner-up in 2025 to Momoka Ishizaki.

In 2023, Sasaki made her car racing debut for ALBA in Kyojo Cup, in which she took a best result of tenth in the third Fuji race. Returning to ALBA for the following season, Sasaki began the season with a fifth-place finish, and finished no lower than eighth in the remaining five races to end the year eighth in the overall standings. During 2024, Sasaki also began venturing to classic car races alongside her Kyojo Cup schedule, most notably finishing fifth overall and second in the S class at the JCCA Tsukuba Meeting the following year.

With the series moving on from the Vita-01 to field the KC-MG01 F4 car for 2025, Sasaki remained in the series, joining series newcomers KCMG's four-car lineup. After taking a best result of sixth in the first two rounds, Sasaki took her season-best result of second in the third feature race of the season. Following that, Sasaki took her best qualifying result of second in the fourth round and capped off the year by finishing fourth in the final two races to secure fifth in overall points.

At the start of 2026, Sasaki raced at the Dubai 24 Hour for Rookie Racing in the TCX class alongside Miki Onaga, Rio Shimono, Kokoro Sato and Aimi Saito. For the rest of the year, Sasaki returned to KCMG for her fourth campaign in Kyojo Cup, in which she took a best result of fifth in round three en route to tenth in overall points.

== Karting record ==
=== Karting career summary ===
Season	Series	Team	Position
2019	CA Kart Race – KT Challenge	SPS Kawaguchi	
2020	CA Kart Race – KT Challenge	SPS Kawaguchi	
2020	CA Kart Race – Akigase SS	SPS Kawaguchi	
2021	CA Kart Race – Akigase SS	SPS Kawaguchi	
2022	CA Kart Race – Akigase SS	SPS Kawaguchi	
2023	RMC APG Series – Max Lights Senior	Garage Chabatake	5th
2025	RMC APG Series – Max Lights Kyojo	Garage Chabatake	2nd
2026	RMC APG Series – Max Lights Kyojo	Garage Chabatake	7th

== Racing record ==
=== Racing career summary ===
Season	Series	Team	Races	Wins	Poles	F/Laps	Podiums	Points	Position
2023	Kyojo Cup	ALBA	4	0	0	0	0	0	NC
2024	Kyojo Cup	ALBA	6	0	0	0	0	23	8th
2025	Kyojo Cup	Kids com Team KCMG	10	0	0	0	1	43	5th
2025–26	24H Series Middle East – TCX	Toyota Gazoo Rookie Racing	1	0	0	0	1	54	NC
2026	Kyojo Cup	Nat Team KCMG	10	0	0	0	0	14	10th

=== Complete Kyojo Cup results ===
(key) (Races in bold indicate pole position) (Races in italics indicate fastest lap)

Year	Entrant	1	2	3	4	5	6	7	8	9	10	Pos	Points
2023	ALBA	FUJ1; 15	FUJ2; 13	FUJ3; 10	FUJ4; 11							NC	0
2024	ALBA	FUJ1; 5	FUJ2; 1; 8	FUJ2; 2; 8	FUJ3; 7	FUJ4; 7	NC; 1	NC; 2	FUJ5; 8			8th	23
2025	Kids com Team KCMG	FUJ1; SPR; 7	FUJ1; FIN; 6	FUJ2; SPR; 9	FUJ2; FIN; 19	FUJ3; SPR; 5	FUJ3; FIN; 2	FUJ4; SPR; 11^{2}	FUJ4; FIN; 9	FUJ5; SPR; 4	FUJ5; FIN; 4	5th	43
2026	Nat Team KCMG	FUJ1; SPR; 8	FUJ1; FIN; 10	FUJ2; SPR; 8	FUJ2; FIN; Ret	FUJ3; SPR; 5	FUJ3; FIN; 8	FUJ4; SPR; 8^{2}	FUJ4; FIN; 10	FUJ5; SPR; 11	FUJ5; FIN; 17	10th	14
