= Aimi Saito =

Japanese racing driver (born 1994)

- Nationality: (Japan) Japanese
- Born: 18 August 1994 (age 32) Kanagawa Prefecture, Japan

Championship titles
- 2024, 2026: Kyojo Cup

Aimi Saito (斎藤 愛未, Saito Aimi; born 18 August 1994) is a Japanese racing driver who last competed in Kyojo Cup for SCS Team TOM'S.

== Personal life ==
Saito is the wife of 2024 Super Formula champion Sho Tsuboi.

== Career ==
Saito began karting in 1999, competing until 2021. During her karting career, Saito most notably won the 2017 Toyopet SL Kart Meeting in the Ladies class, as well as finishing runner-up in the 2019 APG Winter Cup and third in the 2018 RMC APG Series, both in Senior Max. In 2020, Saito made her car racing debut, competing for the majority of the Kyojo Cup calendar as a privateer, taking a best result of fourth on debut and ended the season tenth in points.

Joining RaiseUPmotorsport for the 2021 season, Saito scored her maiden podiums at Suzuka and the second Fuji race en route to a fifth-place points finish. Saito then returned as a privateer in 2022, began the year with a third-place finish at the second Fuji race, before ending the year with a second-place finish at the finale to clinch third in overall points. Joining Ai Miura's Team M for her fourth season in the series, Saito finished no lower than fourth across the four-race season to take third in points, with a best result of third in the season finale.

Remaining with Team M for 2024, Saito finished second to Miki Onaga in the season-opener, before taking her maiden series wins in the Super Formula-supported round two to take the points lead. Following that, Saito took two wins in the final three races to secure her first Kyojo Cup title. In 2025, Saito joined series newcomers TOM'S for the series' first season of the Kyojo Formula era. After finishing no higher than seventh in the season-opening round, Saito took her only win of the season in round two's sprint race, and four other podiums to end the year third overall. During 2025, Saito also competed for Rn-sports in the F110 Cup, as well as winning the Fuji 24 Hours in ST-Q for TOYOTA GAZOO ROOKIE Racing.

At the start of 2026, Saito raced at the Dubai 24 Hour for Rookie Racing in the TC class alongside Onaga, Rio Shimono, Kokoro Sato and Rami Sasaki. For the rest of the year, Saito returned to TOM'S for her seventh campaign in Kyojo Cup. In her seventh season in the series, Saito took her first win of the season in round two, before winning the final two races of the season and taking four additional podiums to clinch her second series title by 13 points over Kokoro Sato.

== Karting record ==
=== Karting career summary ===
| Season | Series | Team | Position |
|---|---|---|---|
| 2001 | Nakai Inter Circuit Kids Kart Festa – Normal 30 | | |
| 2002 | APG Challenge Cup – TRY | | |
| 2002 | Oi Matsuda Kart Series – TRY | | |
| 2003 | APG Challenge Cup – TRY | | |
| 2003 | Oi Matsuda Kart Series – TRY | | |
| 2004 | East Japan Junior Championship – JII | | |
| 2004 | Oi Matsuda Kart Series – JII | | |
| 2004 | SL National Championship – Cadet | | 5th |
| 2005 | Oi Matsuda Kart Series – TIA-Jr | | |
| 2005 | SL National Championship – TIA-Jr | | |
| 2006 | All-Japan Karting Championship – Junior | | |
| 2006 | Oi Matsuda Kart Series – Yamaha-Jr | | |
| 2006 | Shin Tokyo Circuit NTCCUP – S | | |
| 2006 | SL National Championship – Yamaha-Jr | | |
| 2007 | New Tokyo Circuit NTCCUP – FA-B | | |
| 2010 | New Tokyo Circuit NTCCUP – SS | | |
| 2010 | APG Challenge Cup – SS | | |
| 2011 | New Tokyo Circuit NTCCUP – SS | | |
| 2012 | New Tokyo Circuit NTCCUP – SS | | |
| 2013 | New Tokyo Circuit NTCCUP – SS | | |
| 2014 | New Tokyo Circuit NTCCUP – SS | | |
| 2016 | New Tokyo Circuit NTCCUP – SS | | |
| 2016 | Motegi Kart Race – SS | | |
| 2017 | APG Winter Cup – Senior Max | | 4th |
| 2017 | Toyopet SL Kart Meeting – Ladies | Super License | 1st |
| 2018 | RMC APG Series – Senior Max | | 3rd |
| 2018 | JAF Regional Kart Championship – FS-125 | | |
| 2018 | RMC Japan Festival – Senior Max | Zi-ViVre RT | 7th |
| 2019 | APG Winter Cup – Senior Max | Zi-ViVre RT | 2nd |
| 2019 | RMC APG Series – Senior Max | | |
| 2019 | RMC Mizunami Series – Senior Max | Zi-ViVre RT | 12th |
| 2020 | All-Japan Junior Karting Championship – FS-125 | Zi-ViVre RT | 34th |
| 2020 | Junior Kart West Region Championship – FS-125 | Zi-ViVre RT | 16th |
| 2021 | All-Japan Karting Championship – OK | Rosa Drago Corse | 30th |

== Racing record ==
=== Racing career summary ===
| Season | Series | Team | Races | Wins | Poles | F/Laps | Podiums | Points | Position |
|---|---|---|---|---|---|---|---|---|---|
| 2020 | Kyojo Cup | Aimi Saito | 3 | 0 | 0 | 0 | 0 | 10 | 10th |
| 2021 | Kyojo Cup | RaiseUPmotorsport | 4 | 0 | 0 | 0 | 2 | 27 | 5th |
| 2022 | Kyojo Cup | Aimi Saito | 4 | 0 | 0 | 0 | 2 | 56 | **3rd** |
| 2023 | Kyojo Cup | Team M | 4 | 0 | 0 | 0 | 1 | 46 | **3rd** |
| 2024 | Kyojo Cup | Team M | 6 | 4 | 3 | 2 | 5 | 115.5 | **1st** |
| 2025 | F110 Cup | Rn-sports | 6 | 0 | 0 | 0 | 0 | 9 | 16th |
| 2025 | Kyojo Cup | BigBoss W Team TOM'S | 10 | 1 | 2 | 2 | 5 | 74 | **3rd** |
| 2025 | Super Taikyu – ST-Q | TOYOTA GAZOO ROOKIE Racing | 1 | 1 | 0 | 0 | 1 | 0‡ | NC‡ |
| 2025–26 | 24H Series Middle East – TC | Toyota Gazoo Rookie Racing | 1 | 0 | 0 | 0 | 1 | 54 | NC |
| 2026 | Kyojo Cup | SCS Team TOM'S | 10 | 3 | 2 | 4 | 7 | 102 | **1st** |

=== Complete Kyojo Cup results ===
(key) (Races in bold indicate pole position) (Races in italics indicate fastest lap)

| Year | Entrant | 1 | 2 | 3 | 4 | 5 | 6 | 7 | 8 | 9 | 10 | Pos | Points |
|---|---|---|---|---|---|---|---|---|---|---|---|---|---|
| 2020 | Privateer | FUJ1; 4 | SUZ | FUJ2; 8 | FUJ3; Ret | | | | | | | 10th | 10 |
| 2021 | RaiseUPmotorsport | FUJ1; 9 | SUZ; 3 | FUJ2; 3 | FUJ3; 8 | | | | | | | 5th | 27 |
| 2022 | Privateer | FUJ1; 4 | FUJ2; 3 | FUJ3; 4 | FUJ4; 2 | | | | | | | 3rd | 56 |
| 2023 | Team M | FUJ1; 4 | FUJ2; 4 | FUJ3; 5 | FUJ4; 3 | | | | | | | 3rd | 46 |
| 2024 | Team M | **FUJ1**; 2 | FUJ2; 1; 1 | FUJ2; 2; 1 | **FUJ3**; 1 | FUJ4; 12 | NC; 1 | NC; 2 | **FUJ5**; 1 | | | 1st | 115.5 |
| 2025 | BigBoss W Team TOM'S | FUJ1; SPR; 14 | FUJ1; FIN; 7 | **FUJ2**; **SPR**; 1^{1} | FUJ2; FIN; 2 | **FUJ3**; **SPR**; 19^{1} | FUJ3; FIN; 10 | FUJ4; SPR; 5 | FUJ4; FIN; 2 | FUJ5; SPR; 3^{2} | FUJ5; FIN; 3 | 3rd | 74 |
| 2026 | SCS Team TOM'S | FUJ1; SPR; 5^{3} | FUJ1; FIN; 3 | FUJ2; SPR; 2 | FUJ2; FIN; 1 | FUJ3; SPR; 3 | FUJ3; FIN; 3 | FUJ4; SPR; 5 | FUJ4; FIN; 18 | **FUJ5**; **SPR**; 1^{1} | FUJ5; FIN; 1 | 1st | 102 |
