= 2026 Toyota Gazoo Racing GR86/BRZ Cup =

Japanese motor racing season

The 2026 TOYOTA GAZOO Racing GR86/BRZ Cup was the fourteenth running of the TGR GR86/BRZ Cup, a one-make motor racing championship for Toyota 86 and Subaru BRZ sports cars operated by Toyota Gazoo Racing. The championship features a mix of Toyota factory drivers, independent professional drivers, and gentleman drivers, and commenced on 5 April at Autopolis; it concludes on 22 November at Mobility Resort Motegi.

== Teams and drivers ==
=== Professional Series ===
Manufacturer	Team	No.	Driver	Rounds
Toyota	T by Two CABANA Racing	1	(Japan) Yuui Tsutsumi	1–6
Toyota	K-one Racing Team	2	(Japan) Eijirō Shimizu	1–6
Toyota	K-one Racing Team	17	(Japan) Yūsuke Tomibayashi	1–6
Toyota	K-one Racing Team	24	(Japan) Ryōto Satō	1–6
Toyota	Mansaku Jidousya	5	(Japan) Takashi Inoue	1–6
Toyota	GR Garage Urawamisono with GB	8	(Japan) Keiichi Watanabe	2, 5–6
Toyota	GR Garage Urawamisono with GB	160	(Japan) Hiroki Yoshida	1–6
Toyota	OTG Motor Sports	10	(Japan) Tōgo Suganami	1–6
Toyota	OTG Motor Sports	34	(Japan) Masahiro Sasaki	1, 3–6
Toyota	OTG Motor Sports	60	(Japan) Ryō Ogawa	1–2, 4–6
Toyota	OTG Motor Sports	60	(Japan) Naoki Hattori	3
Toyota	OTG Motor Sports	70	(Japan) Naoki Hattori	1–2, 4–6
Toyota	OTG Motor Sports	80	(Japan) Ryō Ogawa	3
Toyota	OTG Motor Sports	90	(Japan) Miki Onaga	1–6
Toyota	Ibaraki Toyopet Racing Team	11	(Japan) Yūichi Nakayama	5–6
Toyota	Ibaraki Toyopet Racing Team	18	(Japan) Tatsuya Minowa	1–6
Toyota	Okamoto Masakazu	13	(Japan) Masakazu Okamoto	6
Toyota	KMS Racing	31	(Japan) Takayuki Aoki	2–5
Toyota	Delta Motorsports	708	(Japan) Yōhei Maruyama	1–6
Toyota	Delta Motorsports	32	(Japan) Tomoaki Ichimori	1–4
Toyota	KSM	32	(Japan) Tomoaki Ichimori	6
Toyota	KSM	291	(Japan) Tomoaki Ichimori	5
Toyota	KSM	291	(Japan) Hikaru Sasaki	6
Toyota	KSM	293	(Japan) Daichi Okamoto	1–6
Toyota	Takashima Noboru	50	(Japan) Noboru Takashima	3
Toyota	Tochigi Toyota T2 FACTORY	56	(Japan) Yoshiyuki Tsuruga	1–2, 5–6
Toyota	Morikawa Motoo	76	(Japan) Motoo Morikawa	1–3, 5–6
Toyota	DTEC Team MASTER ONE	97	(Japan) Tomoki Takahashi	1–6
Toyota	DTEC Team MASTER ONE	98	(Japan) Yūgo Iwasawa	1–6
Toyota	Netz Hyōgo Racing Team	121	(Japan) Naoya Gamou	1, 3–6
Toyota	NETZ TOYAMA Racing	123	(Japan) Takamitsu Matsui	1–6
Toyota	Netz Chiba Sport Racing	141	(Japan) Kazuhito Ishii	2
Toyota	Netz Chiba Sport Racing	142	(Japan) Kazuhito Ishii	5
Toyota	AVANTECH racing team	186	(Japan) Ryō Yamada	5
Toyota	AVANTECH racing team	186	(Japan) Tokiya Suzuki	6
Toyota	Nine WITH ARN RACING	199	(Japan) Rikuto Kobayashi	2–3, 5–6
Toyota	KTMS	225	(Japan) Riona Tomishita	1, 3–6
Toyota	KTMS	225	(Japan) Rio Shimono	2
Toyota	Okinawa Dream Racing	330	(Japan) Hibiki Taira	1–6
Toyota	TMR	337	(Japan) Kōhei Tokumasu	3, 6
Toyota	Hiroshima Toyopet Racing Team	360	(Japan) Yūga Furutani	1–3, 5–6
Toyota	Team MEISHIN	550	(Japan) Shoutarou Munetou	1–6
Toyota	MT58Racing	580	(Japan) Yasunori Fuchigami	1
Toyota	Recaro Racing Team	906	(Japan) Tsubasa Kondō	2–6
Toyota	M Planning	910	(Japan) Hiroyuki Saka	2–6
Toyota	GLW Racing Team	990	(Japan) Kansei Takemura	1–3, 5–6
Subaru	Team Takuty	87	(Japan) Rintarō Kubo	1, 3–6
Subaru	Team Takuty	87	(Japan) Susumu Itō	2
Subaru	Team Takuty	88	(Japan) Takuto Iguchi	1, 3–6
Subaru	Team Takuty	88	(Japan) Kazuhiro Itō	2
Subaru	Team Takuty	89	(Japan) Shunji Okumoto	1, 3–6
Subaru	Team Takuty	89	(Japan) Masafumi Hanazawa	2
	Source:			

== Race calendar and results ==
All races will be held in Japan. The provisional calendar was announced on. All rounds were held alongside other national-level and local racing events; Rounds 1–4 were held alongside the TOYOTA GAZOO Racing Yaris Cup sister series. Round 2 at Sugo was also run in support of the SRO Japan Cup, with Rounds 3 and 6 being run alongside the Porsche Sprint Challenge Japan. Round 5 at Fuji was run in support of the Inter Proto Series and Kyojo Cup.

Round	Circuit	Date	Pole position	Fastest lap	Winning driver	Winning team
1	(Ōita Prefecture) Autopolis, Hita	5 April	(Japan) Tōgo Suganami	(Japan) Naoya Gamou	(Japan) Naoya Gamou	Netz Hyōgo Racing Team
2	(Miyagi Prefecture) Sportsland SUGO, Murata	17 May	(Japan) Tōgo Suganami	(Japan) Eijirō Shimizu	(Japan) Eijirō Shimizu	K-one Racing Team
3	(Okayama Prefecture) Okayama International Circuit, Mimasaka	28 June	(Japan) Tōgo Suganami	(Japan) Takamitsu Matsui	(Japan) Tsubasa Kondō	Recaro Racing Team
4	(Hokkaido) Tokachi International Speedway, Sarabetsu	9 August	(Japan) Tsubasa Kondō	(Japan) Naoya Gamou	(Japan) Naoya Gamou	Netz Hyōgo Racing Team
5	(Shizuoka Prefecture) Fuji Speedway, Oyama	6 September	(Japan) Yūsuke Tomibayashi	(Japan) Yuui Tsutsumi	(Japan) Yuui Tsutsumi	T by Two CABANA Racing
6	(Mie Prefecture) Suzuka International Racing Course, Suzuka	4 October	(Japan) Naoya Gamou	(Japan) Takamitsu Matsui	(Japan) Naoya Gamou	Netz Hyōgo Racing Team
7	(Tochigi Prefecture) Mobility Resort Motegi, Motegi	22 November				

== Championship standings ==
=== Drivers' Championship ===
Points were awarded to the top ten classified finishers, with one point awarded for pole position and fastest lap respectively.

1	2	3	4	5	6	7	8	9	10	PP	FL
20	15	12	10	8	6	4	3	2	1	**1**	1

Pos.	Driver	AUT	SUG	OKA	TOK	FSW	SUZ	MOT	Points
1	(Japan) Yuui Tsutsumi	2	2	3	4	1	2		88
2	(Japan) Naoya Gamou	1		11	1	7	**1**		67
3	(Japan) Tōgo Suganami	**3**	**5**	**4**	18	Ret	6		39
4	(Japan) Tsubasa Kondō		Ret	1	**2**	16	Ret		36
5	(Japan) Takamitsu Matsui	7	6	2	10	10	8		32
6	(Japan) Eijirō Shimizu	12	1	16	21	13	5		29
7	(Japan) Yūsuke Tomibayashi	8	10	8	6	**15**	3		26
8	(Japan) Tomoki Takahashi	14	4	9	5	8	Ret		23
9	(Japan) Takuto Iguchi	11		12	8	2	9		20
10	(Japan) Ryō Ogawa	4	31	5	19	22	28		18
11	(Japan) Hibiki Taira	DNS	14	10	24	6	4		17
12	(Japan) Tatsuya Minowa	17	3	22	9	19	20		14
13	(Japan) Rikuto Kobayashi		8	17		4	10		14
14	(Japan) Masahiro Sasaki	Ret		25	3	11	13		12
15	(Japan) Rintarō Kubo	15		20	16	3	33		12
16	(Japan) Naoki Hattori	5	13	7	13	28	18		12
17	(Japan) Yūichi Nakayama					5	7		12
18	(Japan) Daichi Okamoto	22	7	14	7	27	15		8
19	(Japan) Hiroki Yoshida	6	29	18	15	12	16		6
20	(Japan) Kōhei Tokumasu			6			12		6
21	(Japan) Miki Onaga	9	11	31	20	21	23		2
22	(Japan) Shunji Okumoto	16		13	12	9	17		2
23	(Japan) Takayuki Aoki		9	19	14	25			2
24	(Japan) Shoutarou Munetou	10	16	32	25	23	21		1
–	(Japan) Yūga Furutani	WD	12	15		17	11		0
–	(Japan) Yōhei Maruyama	18	25	23	11	20	36		0
–	(Japan) Ryōto Satō	13	28	21	17	14	34		0
–	(Japan) Hikaru Sasaki						14		0
–	(Japan) Yoshiyuki Tsuruga	DNS	15			33	31		0
–	(Japan) Hiroyuki Saka		17	30	26	36	26		0
–	(Japan) Yūgo Iwasawa	19	18	27	23	18	25		0
–	(Japan) Takashi Inoue	23	19	28	27	29	27		0
–	(Japan) Kansei Takemura	24	26	29		24	19		0
–	(Japan) Motoo Morikawa	21	20	26		26	22		0
–	(Japan) Tomoaki Ichimori	20	30	24	22	32	24		0
–	(Japan) Riona Tomishita	26	21	Ret	28	31	29		0
–	(Japan) Susumu Itō		22						0
–	(Japan) Keiichi Watanabe		23			35	32		0
–	(Japan) Kazuhiro Itō		24						0
–	(Japan) Yasunori Fuchigami	25							0
–	(Japan) Kazuhito Ishii		27			30			0
–	(Japan) Masakazu Okamoto						30		0
–	(Japan) Noboru Takashima			33					0
–	(Japan) Ryō Yamada					34			0
–	(Japan) Tokiya Suzuki						35		0
–	(Japan) Masafumi Hanazawa		WD						0
Pos.	Driver	AUT	SUG	OKA	TOK	FSW	SUZ	MOT	Points

Key
Colour	Result
Gold	Race winner
Silver	2nd place
Bronze	3rd place
Green	Points finish
Blue	Non-points finish
Blue	Non-classified finish (NC)
Purple	Did not finish (Ret)
Black	Disqualified (DSQ)
Black	Excluded (EX)
White	Did not start (DNS)
White	Race cancelled (C)
White	Withdrew (WD)
Blank	Did not participate

**Bold** – Pole
Italics – Fastest Lap
