= Joanne Ciconte =

Australian racing driver (born 2008)

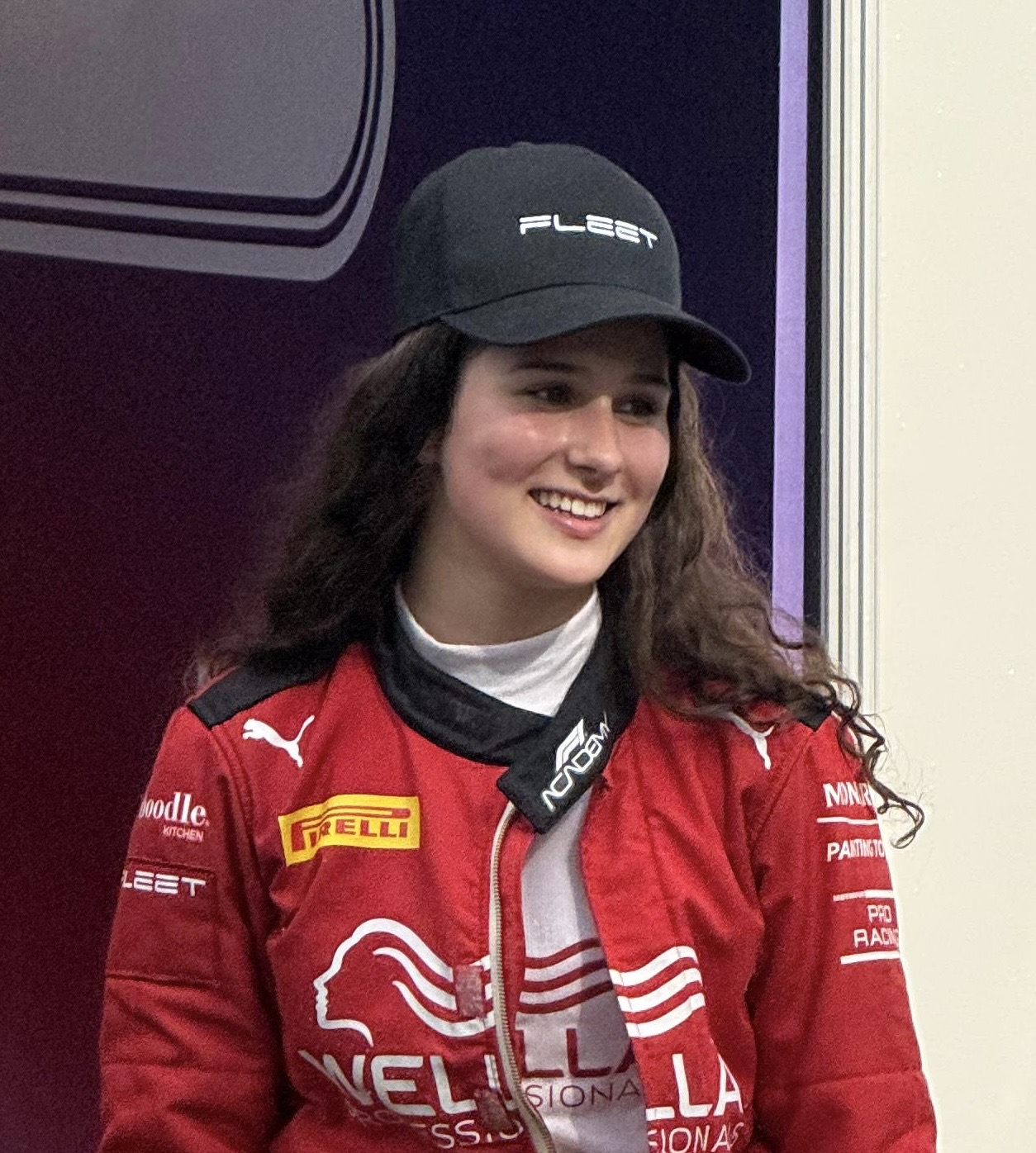
- Ciconte at the 2025 Singapore Grand Prix
- Nationality: (Australia) Australian
- Born: 14 December 2008 (age 17) Melbourne, Victoria, Australia

F1 Academy
- Years active: 2025
- Teams: MP Motorsport
- Car number: 25
- Starts: 14
- Wins: 0
- Podiums: 0
- Poles: 0
- Fastest laps: 0
- Best finish: 14th in 2025

Previous series
- 2025: Formula Winter Series

Joanne Ciconte (born 14 December 2008) is an Australian racing driver who last competed in Kyojo Cup for Nat Team KCMG.

== Early career ==
=== Karting ===
Ciconte began karting at the age of nine. During her time in karting, Ciconte mainly raced in Australia, most notably taking the Pink Plate title in the KA3 Junior Light class and also was one of four finalists for the 2023 edition of the FIA Girls on Track – Rising Stars.

=== Formula 4 ===
==== 2024 ====
In early 2024, Ciconte made her single-seater debut, racing in the Australian Formula Open season opening round at Sandown in the AFO4 class, where she finished all three races as runner-up.

A month after her one-off appearance in Australian Formula Open, Ciconte joined M2/Tim Macrow Racing in the relaunched Formula 4 Australian Championship. In her only round in the championship, Ciconte finished seventh in the first two races and took ninth in race three.

During 2024, Ciconte also joined AS Motorsport in the Formula 4 CEZ Championship for the Brno round. In the three races, Ciconte scored two top-five finishes, a fourth-place finish in race one and a fifth-place result in race three.

Towards the end of the year, Ciconte joined DXR by Drivex in the Spanish F4 Championship. In the two rounds she competed in, she scored a best result of 20th in race two at Barcelona after having started 30th.

==== 2025 ====
At the beginning of 2025, Ciconte raced in Formula Winter Series for AKM Motorsport. Having started the season with two top-twenty finishes at Algarve, Ciconte improved her personal best result by finishing 16th in race three at Valencia, in what was her last round in the series before being replaced by Ginevra Panzeri.

==== 2026 ====
The following year, Ciconte transitioned over to Kyojo Cup, joining Nat Team KCMG for her rookie year in the series. Starting off the season with a pair of second-place finishes, Ciconte then took two additional podiums in round four to end the year fifth in overall points.

=== F1 Academy ===
==== 2025 ====
On March 3, 2025, it was announced that Ciconte would race in F1 Academy for MP Motorsport first supported by F1 Academy. Ciconte qualified sixth on debut in Shanghai, however, in the sprint race she was given a ten-second penalty and was classified in 14th and in the feature race retired after a collision with Chloe Chong. In the following round at Jeddah, Ciconte scored her maiden points of the season by finishing ninth in race two. Having run the F1 Academy Discover Your Drive livery for the first three rounds, Ciconte began sporting a livery with Wella as its main sponsor from Canada onwards, a round in which she finished ninth in race two. Ciconte then scored points again in Singapore by finishing eighth in race two, and ended the season with a tenth-place finish in the sprint race at Las Vegas to round out the year 14th in points.

== Karting record ==
=== Karting career summary ===
Season	Series	Position
2018	Victorian State Cup — Cadet 9	4th
2018	Oakleigh Go Kart Racing Club Class Titles — Cadet 9	3rd
2018	Geelong Junior Challenge — Cadet 9	4th
2019	Victorian Kart Championship — Cadet 12	18th
2019	Eastern Lions Kart Club Junior Sprint Classic — Cadet 12	7th
2019	City of Melbourne Kart Championship — Cadet 12	33rd
2019	The Bairnsdale Open — Cadets	6th
2020	Australian Kart Championship — Cadet 12	42nd
2020	Tasmanian Kart Championship — Cadet 12	2nd
2020	Victorian State Cup — Cadet 12	7th
2020	Oakleigh Go Kart Racing Club Class Titles — Cadet 12	10th
2021	Australian Kart Championship — Cadet 12	53rd
2022	Australian Kart Championship — KA4 Junior Light	37th
2022	Victorian Kart Championship — KA4 Junior Light	6th
2022	Junior Sprint Classic — KA4 Junior Light	14th
2022	City of Melbourne Kart Championship — KA4 Junior Light	11th
2023	Australian Kart Championship — KA3 Junior	22nd
2023	Victorian Kart Championship — KA3 Junior	14th
2023	City of Melbourne Kart Championship — KA3 Junior	7th
2023	The Pink Plate Kart Titles — KA3 Junior	1st

== Racing record ==
=== Racing career summary ===
Season	Series	Team	Races	Wins	Poles	F/Laps	Podiums	Points	Position
2024	Australian Formula Open – AFO4	Tim Macrow Racing	3	0	0	0	3	33	4th
2024	Formula 4 Australian Championship	Formula Race Academy	3	0	0	0	0	14	16th
2024	Formula 4 CEZ Championship	AS Motorsport	3	0	0	0	0	26	18th
2024	F4 Spanish Championship	DXR by Drivex	6	0	0	0	0	0	NC†
2025	Formula Winter Series	AKM Motorsport	6	0	0	0	0	0	34th
2025	F1 Academy	MP Motorsport	14	0	0	0	0	8	14th
2026	Kyojo Cup	Nat Team KCMG	10	0	0	2	4	70	5th

*Season still in progress.

=== Complete Formula 4 Australian Championship results ===
(key) (Races in bold indicate pole position; races in italics indicate fastest lap)

Year	Team	1	2	3	4	5	6	7	8	9	10	11	12	DC	Points
2024	Formula Race Academy	BEN1; 1; 7	BEN1; 2; 7	BEN1; 3; 9	BEN2; 1	BEN2; 2	BEN2; 3	SYD; 1	SYD; 2	SYD; 3	SEP; 1	SEP; 2	SEP; 3	16th	14

=== Complete Formula 4 CEZ Championship results ===
(key) (Races in bold indicate pole position) (Races in italics indicate fastest lap)

Year	Team	1	2	3	4	5	6	7	8	9	10	11	12	13	14	15	16	17	18	DC	Points
2024	AS Motorsport	BAL; 1	BAL; 2	BAL; 3	RBR; 1	RBR; 2	RBR; 3	SVK; 1	SVK; 2	SVK; 3	MOS; 1	MOS; 2	MOS; 3	BRN; 1; 4	BRN; 2; 8	BRN; 3; 5	SAL; 1 WD	SAL; 2 WD	SAL; 3 WD	18th	26

=== Complete F4 Spanish Championship results ===
(key) (Races in bold indicate pole position) (Races in italics indicate fastest lap)

Year	Team	1	2	3	4	5	6	7	8	9	10	11	12	13	14	15	16	17	18	19	20	21	DC	Points
2024	DXR by Drivex	JAR; 1	JAR; 2	JAR; 3	POR; 1	POR; 2	POR; 3	LEC; 1	LEC; 2	LEC; 3	ARA; 1	ARA; 2	ARA; 3	CRT; 1	CRT; 2	CRT; 3	JER; 1 Ret	JER; 2; 28	JER; 3; 31†	CAT; 1; 21	CAT; 2; 20	CAT; 3; 23	NC†	0

† As Ciconte was a guest driver, she was ineligible for points

=== Complete Formula Winter Series results ===
(key) (Races in bold indicate pole position) (Races in italics indicate fastest lap)

Year	Team	1	2	3	4	5	6	7	8	9	10	11	12	DC	Points
2025	AKM Motorsport	POR; 1; 19	POR; 2; 20	POR; 3; 22	CRT; 1 Ret	CRT; 2; 26	CRT; 3; 16	ARA; 1	ARA; 2	ARA; 3	CAT; 1	CAT; 2	CAT; 3	34th	0

=== Complete F1 Academy results ===
(key) (Races in bold indicate pole position; races in italics indicate fastest lap)

Year	Team	1	2	3	4	5	6	7	8	9	10	11	12	13	14	15	DC	Points
2025	MP Motorsport	SHA; 1; 14	SHA; 2 Ret	JED; 1; 11	JED; 2; 9	MIA; 1 Ret	MIA; 2 C	MTL; 1; 14†	MTL; 2; 15	MTL; 3; 9	ZAN; 1; 14	ZAN; 2; 13	SIN; 1; 11	SIN; 2; 8	LVG; 1; 10	LVG; 2 Ret	14th	8

=== Complete Kyojo Cup results ===
(key) (Races in bold indicate pole position; races in italics indicate fastest lap)

Year	Team	1	2	3	4	5	6	7	8	9	10	DC	Points
2026	Nat Team KCMG	FUJ1; SR; 2	FUJ1; FR; 2	FUJ2; SR; 6	FUJ2; FR; 4	FUJ3; SR; 4	FUJ3; FR; 4	FUJ4; SR; 3	FUJ4; FR; 2	FUJ5; SR; 14	FUJ5; FR; 11	5th	70
