= Hana Burton =

American racing driver (born 1997)

- Nationality: (United States) American
- Born: 21 May 1997 (age 29) Los Angeles, California, U.S.

Hana Burton (ハナ・バートン, Hana Bāton; born 21 May 1997) is a Japanese-based American racing driver who last competed in Kyojo Cup for SCS Team TOM'S.

== Career ==
While working in the marketing department of HKS, Burton participated on her first track day event at Chuckwalla Valley Raceway in 2019. After attending other track day events, Burton met fellow racing driver Arisa Mizuhara, who helped her obtain a Japanese racing licence ahead of the 2022 Toyota Yaris Cup East Japan Series, in which she sealed the Rookie of the Year and Goodyear Awards. In 2023, Burton moved to the all-female Kyojo Cup with Fujita Pharmacy Racing, taking a best result of eighth in the finale to end her rookie year 11th in points. Returning to the series the following year, Burton scored three points finishes, including a best result of fourth, en route to a ninth-place points finish.

With the series switching to a KC-MG01 chassis and Super Formula teams joining for 2025, Burton joined TOM'S for her third season, as a Toyota Gazoo Racing-supported driver. Despite qualifying an impressive second in the season-opener, Burton was only able to muster a best result of sixth three times to end her campaign ninth overall. During 2025, Burton also made her Super Taikyu debut for Access Racing Team in the ST-5F class at the Fuji 24 Hours, as well as founding her own Circuit Orange team. In May, Burton also made a one-off appearance in Radical Cup Korea, taking two SR1 class wins at Yeongam.

The following year, Burton remained with TOM'S to remain in Kyojo Cup, as well as joining Club Mazda Spirit Racing for her maiden full-time season in the ST-5R class of Super Taikyu. In Kyojo Cup, Burton took a best result of fifth in round five's sprint race to take ninth in overall points. During 2026, Burton also joined 610Racing to make her debut in the China GT Championship, winning both races at Ningbo in the 992 class alongside Shi Wei.

== Racing record ==
=== Racing career summary ===
Season	Series	Team	Races	Wins	Poles	F/Laps	Podiums	Points	Position
2022	Toyota Yaris Cup East Japan Series								
2023	Kyojo Cup	Fujita Pharmacy Racing	4	0	0	0	0	3	11th
2024	Kyojo Cup	Fujita Pharmacy Racing	3	0	0	0	0	21	9th
2024	Kyojo Cup	PassingMark	3	0	0	1	0	21	9th
2025	Kyojo Cup	BigBoss W Team TOM'S	10	0	0	0	0	21	9th
2025	Radical Cup Korea			2			2		
2025	Super Taikyu – ST-5F	Access Racing Team	1	0	0	0	0	47.5‡	6th‡
2026	Super Taikyu – ST-5R	Club Mazda Spirit Racing	2	0	0	0	1	49‡*	4th‡*
2026	China GT Championship – 992	610Racing	4	2	0	0	4	86*	**1st***
2026	Kyojo Cup	SCS Team TOM'S	10	0	0	0	0	14	9th

^{‡} Team standings.

=== Complete Kyojo Cup results ===
(key) (Races in bold indicate pole position) (Races in italics indicate fastest lap)

Year	Entrant	1	2	3	4	5	6	7	8	9	10	Pos	Points
2023	Fujita Pharmacy Racing	FUJ1; Ret	FUJ2; 11	FUJ3; 12	FUJ4; 8							11th	3
2024	Fujita Pharmacy Racing	FUJ1; 8	FUJ2; 1; 9	FUJ2; 2; 13								9th	21
2024	PassingMark				FUJ3; 4	FUJ4; 5	NC; 1	NC; 2	FUJ5; 9			9th	21
2025	BigBoss W Team TOM'S	FUJ1; SPR; 6^{2}	FUJ1; FIN; 9	FUJ2; SPR; Ret^{3}	FUJ2; FIN; 8	FUJ3; SPR; 12	FUJ3; FIN; 14	FUJ4; SPR; 8	FUJ4; FIN; 10	FUJ5; SPR; 6	FUJ5; FIN; 6	9th	21
2026	SCS Team TOM'S	FUJ1; SPR; 12	FUJ1; FIN; 8	FUJ2; SPR; 7	FUJ2; FIN; 7	FUJ3; SPR; 11	FUJ3; FIN; 10	FUJ4; SPR; 11	FUJ4; FIN; 17	FUJ5; SPR; 5	FUJ5; FIN; 19	9th	14
