= 2024 NSW Formula Car Championship =

Formula racing season

The 2024 Motorsport Australia NSW Formula Car Championship was the 14th season of the NSW Formula Car Championship, run as a fully affiliated Motorsport Australia State Championship since 2011.

The championship was originally planned to be run over six weekends, starting on 27 April at Winton Motor Raceway. As the last two weekends did not go ahead as scheduled, the championship ended after four rounds, on 20 October at Sydney Motorsport Park. Rodney Baker won the title after going on an eleven-race winning spree that only ended when he retired from the final race of the season.

2024 saw the series continue its cooperation with the Australian Formula Open series, with the championships sharing grids and race slots on multiple occasions.

== Entry list ==
All drivers were Australian-registered.

No.	Car	Driver	Rounds
3	Mantis M2001	Robert Sviderskas	2
12	Dallara F399	Rodney Baker	All
19	Ralt RT4	Arthur Abrahams	1–2
21	Dallara F3	Graeme Holmes	2–4
23	Dallara F304	Lawrence Katsidis	All
24	Dallara F304	Nathan Beer	All
38	Reynard 893	Rod Anderson	2
40	Mygale	Tim Bodyle	2
41	Dallara F301	Greg Muddle	1, 3
44	Reynard 92D	Douglas Barry	1–3
50	Dallara	Rodney Brincat	3–4
51	Dallara F399	Ron Bennet	All
55	Dallara F397	Glenn Lynch	2
72	Performer/P1000	Shane Varley	3
76	Dallara F302	Jeffrey Senior	2–3
95	Dallara F301	Phil Morrow	2
95	Dallara F301	Shayne Morrow	4
666	Stohr F1000	Adam Savic	3

== Race calendar ==
The 2024 calendar was announced in February of 2024, comprising five rounds in its initial iteration. The third round of the championship awarded double points. A round at One Raceway was to be added later on, bringing the total up to six events, but the final two rounds received no entries and did not go ahead.

Round		Circuit	Date	Support bill	Map of circuit locations
1	R1	(Victoria (state)) Winton Motor Raceway, Winton	27 April	NSW State Championships; Australian Formula Open; Australian Formula Ford Series; RX8 Cup Australia	2024 NSW Formula Car Championship is located in Australia
1	R2	(Victoria (state)) Winton Motor Raceway, Winton	28 April	NSW State Championships; Australian Formula Open; Australian Formula Ford Series; RX8 Cup Australia	2024 NSW Formula Car Championship is located in Australia
1	R3	(Victoria (state)) Winton Motor Raceway, Winton	28 April	NSW State Championships; Australian Formula Open; Australian Formula Ford Series; RX8 Cup Australia	2024 NSW Formula Car Championship is located in Australia
2	R1	(New South Wales) Sydney Motorsport Park, Eastern Creek	25 May	NSW State Championships; Australian Formula Open; Australian Formula Ford Series; RX8 Cup Australia	2024 NSW Formula Car Championship is located in Australia
2	R2	(New South Wales) Sydney Motorsport Park, Eastern Creek	26 May	NSW State Championships; Australian Formula Open; Australian Formula Ford Series; RX8 Cup Australia	2024 NSW Formula Car Championship is located in Australia
2	R3	(New South Wales) Sydney Motorsport Park, Eastern Creek	26 May	NSW State Championships; Australian Formula Open; Australian Formula Ford Series; RX8 Cup Australia	2024 NSW Formula Car Championship is located in Australia
3‡	R1	(New South Wales) Sydney Motorsport Park, Eastern Creek	3 August	NSW State Championships; RX8 Cup Australia; Formula 4 Australian Championship; Australian Formula Vee	2024 NSW Formula Car Championship is located in Australia
3‡	R2	(New South Wales) Sydney Motorsport Park, Eastern Creek	4 August	NSW State Championships; RX8 Cup Australia; Formula 4 Australian Championship; Australian Formula Vee	2024 NSW Formula Car Championship is located in Australia
3‡	R3	(New South Wales) Sydney Motorsport Park, Eastern Creek	4 August	NSW State Championships; RX8 Cup Australia; Formula 4 Australian Championship; Australian Formula Vee	2024 NSW Formula Car Championship is located in Australia
4	R1	(New South Wales) Sydney Motorsport Park, Eastern Creek	19 October	GT World Challenge Australia; TCR Australia Touring Car Series; Australian Formula Open; GT4 Australia Series	2024 NSW Formula Car Championship is located in Australia
4	R2	(New South Wales) Sydney Motorsport Park, Eastern Creek	20 October	GT World Challenge Australia; TCR Australia Touring Car Series; Australian Formula Open; GT4 Australia Series	2024 NSW Formula Car Championship is located in Australia
4	R3	(New South Wales) Sydney Motorsport Park, Eastern Creek	20 October	GT World Challenge Australia; TCR Australia Touring Car Series; Australian Formula Open; GT4 Australia Series	2024 NSW Formula Car Championship is located in Australia

== Race results ==
Round		Circuit	Pole position	Fastest lap	Winning driver
1	R1	(Victoria (state)) Winton Motor Raceway	Rodney Baker	Rodney Baker	Rodney Baker
1	R2	(Victoria (state)) Winton Motor Raceway		Rodney Baker	Rodney Baker
1	R3	(Victoria (state)) Winton Motor Raceway		Rodney Baker	Rodney Baker
2	R1	(New South Wales) Sydney Motorsport Park	Arthur Abrahams	Rodney Baker	Rodney Baker
2	R2	(New South Wales) Sydney Motorsport Park		Rodney Baker	Rodney Baker
2	R3	(New South Wales) Sydney Motorsport Park		Rodney Baker	Rodney Baker
3‡	R1	(New South Wales) Sydney Motorsport Park	Rodney Baker	Rodney Baker	Rodney Baker
3‡	R2	(New South Wales) Sydney Motorsport Park		Rodney Baker	Rodney Baker
3‡	R3	(New South Wales) Sydney Motorsport Park		Rodney Baker	Rodney Baker
4	R1	(New South Wales) Sydney Motorsport Park	Rodney Baker	Rodney Baker	Rodney Baker
4	R2	(New South Wales) Sydney Motorsport Park		Rodney Baker	Rodney Baker
4	R3	(New South Wales) Sydney Motorsport Park		Rodney Baker	Lawrence Katsidis

== Championship standings ==
Points are awarded as follows:

Position	1st	2nd	3rd	4th	5th	6th	7th	8th	9th	10th
Points	25	18	15	12	10	8	6	4	2	1

Pos	Driver	WIN (Victoria (state))			SYD1 (New South Wales)			SYD2‡ (New South Wales)			SYD3 (New South Wales)			Pts
Pos	Driver	R1	R2	R3	R1	R2	R3	R1	R2	R3	R1	R2	R3	Pts
1	Rodney Baker	**1**	1	1	1	1	1	**1**	1	1	**1**	1	Ret	350
2	Douglas Barry	3	2	3	5	3	2	2	2	Ret				163
3	Graeme Holmes				3	2	3	3	4	2	2	Ret	DNS	141
4	Lawrence Katsidis	4	3	2	4	4	Ret	6	6	Ret	Ret	4	1	122
5	Rodney Brincat							4	3	3	3	3	DNS	114
6	Nathan Beer	5	5	6	9	7	5	10	8	6	4	5	3	109
7	Ron Bennet	Ret	4	5	WD	WD	WD	5	9	4	Ret	2	2	106
8	Arthur Abrahams	2	6†	4	**2**	Ret	DNS							56
9	Shane Varley							8	7	5				40
10	Greg Muddle	WD	WD	WD				7	5	Ret				32
11	Glenn Lynch				7	5	4							28
12	Adam Savic							11	10	7				28
13	Tim Bodyle				6	6	6							24
14	Rod Anderson				8	8	DNS							8
15	Jeffrey Senior				WD	WD	WD	9	Ret	Ret				4
16	Phil Morrow				Ret	9	Ret							2
—	Shayne Morrow										Ret	DNS	DNS	0
—	Robert Sviderskas				WD	WD	WD							0
Pos	Driver	R1	R2	R3	R1	R2	R3	R1	R2	R3	R1	R2	R3	Pts
Pos	Driver	WIN (Victoria (state))			SYD1 (New South Wales)			SYD2‡ (New South Wales)			SYD3 (New South Wales)			Pts

Colour	Result
Gold	Winner
Silver	Second place
Bronze	Third place
Green	Points classification
Blue	Non-points classification
Blue	Non-classified finish (NC)
Purple	Retired, not classified (Ret)
Red	Did not qualify (DNQ)
Red	Did not pre-qualify (DNPQ)
Black	Disqualified (DSQ)
White	Did not start (DNS)
White	Withdrew (WD)
White	Race cancelled (C)
Blank	Did not practice (DNP)
Blank	Did not arrive (DNA)
Blank	Excluded (EX)

**Bold** – Pole
Italics – Fastest Lap
† — Did not finish, but classified
‡ — double-points round
