= 2026 Kyojo Cup season =

Formula 4 championship held in 2026

The 2026 Kyojo Cup season was the tenth season of the Kyojo Cup, promoted by Inter Proto Motorsports Co., Ltd.

This was the second season using the Hybrid KCMG KC MG-01, previously used in the 2019 and 2022 FIA Motorsport Games Formula 4 Cups. The FCR-VITA01, which was used from 2017 to 2024, will continue to race in the FCR-Vita series.

== Teams and drivers ==
All teams competed with an identical KCMG KC MG-01 chassis and Abarth 1.4-litre turbocharged hybrid engine, with Bridgestone as the tire supplier for the series.

Team	No.	Driver	Rounds
(Japan) KeePer Kondo Racing	3	(Japan) Sara Matsui	All
(Japan) NTT Docomo Business ROOKIE	4	(Japan) Mako Hirakawa	2, 4–5
(Hong Kong) Nat Team KCMG	7	(Japan) Miki Onaga	All
(Hong Kong) Nat Team KCMG	8	(Japan) Rami Sasaki	All
(Hong Kong) Nat Team KCMG	9	(United States) Kelsey Pinkowski	All
(Hong Kong) Nat Team KCMG	10	(Australia) Joanne Ciconte	All
(Japan) Fujisan Shizuoka Racing	11	(Australia) Paige Raddatz	All
(Japan) Fujisan Shizuoka Racing	12	(Japan) Rina Ito	All
(Japan) Team ReFa with AiWin	17	(Japan) Itsumo Shiraishi	All
(Japan) Team ReFa with AiWin	18	(Japan) Ai Miura	All
(Japan) Mihara Racing Team	32	(Japan) Kilei Kanemoto	All
(Japan) Fukuda Racing	33	(Japan) Marie Iwaoka	All
(Thailand) Inging 2W Zoomies Singha Sittipol Nexzter (Note: Cars No. 38 and No. 39 entered as Team Optimus Cerumo・Inging, cars No. 35 entered as INGING 2W Zoomies Singha Sittipol Nexzter) (Japan) Team Optimus Cerumo・Inging	35	(Thailand) Sitarvee Limnantharak	All
(Thailand) Inging 2W Zoomies Singha Sittipol Nexzter (Japan) Team Optimus Cerumo・Inging	38	(Japan) Kokoro Sato	All
(Thailand) Inging 2W Zoomies Singha Sittipol Nexzter (Japan) Team Optimus Cerumo・Inging	39	(Japan) Riona Tomishita	All
(Japan) SCS Team TOM'S	36	(Japan) Aimi Saito	All
(Japan) SCS Team TOM'S	37	(United States) Hana Burton	All
(Japan) ATeam Buzz Racing	57	(China) Zhao Yunqing	All
(Japan) New'z Racing Club	59	(Japan) Maaya Orido	5
(Japan) Dr.Dry with Team Impul	86	(Japan) Rio Shimono	All
(Japan) Autolook Racing	87	(Japan) Ryu Yamamoto	All

== Calendar and results ==
The provisional calendar for 2026 was confirmed on 26 December 2025, which consisted of five rounds all taking place at Fuji Speedway.

Round		Circuit	Date	Pole position	Fastest lap	Winning driver	Winning team	Supporting
1	SR	(Shizuoka Prefecture) Fuji Speedway	9 May	(Japan) Riona Tomishita	(Japan) Riona Tomishita	(Japan) Riona Tomishita	(Japan) Team Optimus Cerumo・Inging	Porsche Carrera Cup Asia; Fuji Champion Race Series; Inter Proto Series
1	FR	(Shizuoka Prefecture) Fuji Speedway	10 May		(Japan) Aimi Saito	(Japan) Riona Tomishita	(Japan) Team Optimus Cerumo・Inging	Porsche Carrera Cup Asia; Fuji Champion Race Series; Inter Proto Series
2	SR	(Shizuoka Prefecture) Fuji Speedway	18 July	(Japan) Aimi Saito	(Japan) Aimi Saito	(Japan) Ai Miura	(Japan) Team ReFa with AiWin	Super Formula; Porsche Carrera Cup Japan
2	FR	(Shizuoka Prefecture) Fuji Speedway	19 July		(Japan) Aimi Saito	(Japan) Aimi Saito	(Japan) SCS Team TOM'S	Super Formula; Porsche Carrera Cup Japan
3	SR	(Shizuoka Prefecture) Fuji Speedway	5 September	(Japan) Riona Tomishita	(Australia) Joanne Ciconte	(Japan) Riona Tomishita	(Japan) Team Optimus Cerumo・Inging	Toyota Gazoo Racing GR86/BRZ Cup; Fuji Champion Race Series; Inter Proto Series
3	FR	(Shizuoka Prefecture) Fuji Speedway	6 September		(Japan) Riona Tomishita (Australia) Joanne Ciconte	(Japan) Rio Shimono	(Japan) Dr.Dry with Team Impul	Toyota Gazoo Racing GR86/BRZ Cup; Fuji Champion Race Series; Inter Proto Series
4	SR	(Shizuoka Prefecture) Fuji Speedway	10 October	(Japan) Miki Onaga	(Japan) Ai Miura	(Japan) Miki Onaga	(Hong Kong) Nat Team KCMG	Super Formula; Formula Regional Japanese Championship
4	FR	(Shizuoka Prefecture) Fuji Speedway	11 October		(Japan) Miki Onaga	(Japan) Kokoro Sato	(Japan) Team Optimus Cerumo・Inging	Super Formula; Formula Regional Japanese Championship
5	SR	(Shizuoka Prefecture) Fuji Speedway	31 October	(Japan) Aimi Saito	(Japan) Aimi Saito	(Japan) Aimi Saito	(Japan) SCS Team TOM'S	Fuji Champion Race Series; Inter Proto Series
5	FR	(Shizuoka Prefecture) Fuji Speedway	1 November		(Japan) Miki Onaga	(Japan) Aimi Saito	(Japan) SCS Team TOM'S	Fuji Champion Race Series; Inter Proto Series

== Championship standings ==
Qualifying points

Position	**1st**	**2nd**	**3rd**
Points	3	2	1

Sprint race points

Position	**1st**	**2nd**	**3rd**	**4th**	**5th**	**6th**	**7th**	**8th**
Points	10	8	6	5	4	3	2	1

Feature race points

Position	**1st**	**2nd**	**3rd**	**4th**	**5th**	**6th**	**7th**	**8th**	**9th**	**10th**
Points	20	15	11	8	6	5	4	3	2	1

=== Drivers' Championship ===
Pos	Driver	FUJ1		FUJ2		FUJ3		FUJ4		FUJ5		Pts
Pos	Driver	SR	FR	SR	FR	SR	FR	SR	FR	SR	FR	Pts
1	(Japan) Aimi Saito	5^{3}	3	**2**^{1}	1	3^{3}	3	5	Ret	**1**^{1}	1	102
2	(Japan) Kokoro Sato	3	6	3	3	6	7	2^{3}	1	2^{2}	2	89
3	(Japan) Riona Tomishita	**1**^{1}	1	13	5	**1**^{1}	2	6	6	4	4	88
4	(Japan) Miki Onaga	4	4	4^{2}	2	12	19	**1**^{1}	3	3^{3}	3	77
5	(Australia) Joanne Ciconte	2^{2}	2	6	4	4	4	3	2	14	11	70
6	(Japan) Rio Shimono	6	7	5	Ret	2^{2}	1	9	4	Ret	7	53
7	(Japan) Ai Miura	7	5	1^{3}	13	8	17	4	Ret	6	5	38
8	(Japan) Sara Matsui	9	9	9	8	7	5	7	Ret	7	6	22
9	(United States) Hana Burton	12	8	7	7	11	10	11	17	5	19	14
10	(Japan) Rami Sasaki	8	10	8	Ret	5	8	8^{2}	10	11	17	14
11	(Australia) Paige Raddatz	14	15	11	6	9	6	Ret	9	8	18	13
12	(Japan) Kilei Kanemoto	10	11	12	9	10	9	12	5	12	9	12
13	(Japan) Mako Hirakawa			10	11			13	8	10	8	6
14	(Japan) Itsumo Shiraishi	11	13	17	10	13	11	10	7	9	Ret	5
15	(Japan) Marie Iwaoka	13	12	14	17	19	12	14	11	13	10	1
16	(Japan) Rina Ito	18	16	16	12	16	14	18	12	18	Ret	0
17	(Japan) Maaya Orido									16	12	0
18	(Thailand) Sitarvee Limnantharak	17	14	Ret	16	14	13	15	13	17	13	0
19	(Japan) Ryu Yamamoto	15	17	15	14	15	18	16	15	20	14	0
20	(China) Zhao Yunqing	WD	WD	18	Ret	17	15	17	14	15	15	0
21	(United States) Kelsey Pinkowski	16	18	19	15	18	16	Ret	16	19	16	0
Pos	Driver	SR	FR	SR	FR	SR	FR	SR	FR	SR	FR	Pts
Pos	Driver	FUJ1		FUJ2		FUJ3		FUJ4		FUJ5		Pts

Key
Colour	Result
Gold	Winner
Silver	Second place
Bronze	Third place
Green	Other points position
Blue	Other classified position
Blue	Not classified, finished (NC)
Purple	Not classified, retired (Ret)
Red	Did not qualify (DNQ)
Red	Did not pre-qualify (DNPQ)
Black	Disqualified (DSQ)
White	Did not start (DNS)
White	Race cancelled (C)
Blank	Did not practice (DNP)
Blank	Excluded (EX)
Blank	Did not arrive (DNA)
Blank	Withdrawn (WD)
Blank	Did not enter (cell empty)
Text formatting	Meaning
**Bold**	Pole position
Italics	Fastest lap
