= 2026 Dubai 24 Hour =

Motorsport endurance race in Dubai

The layout of the Dubai Autodrome.

The 2026 Michelin Dubai 24 Hour will be the 21st running of the Dubai 24 Hour, a motorsport endurance race at the Dubai Autodrome. The race will be held from 16 to 18 January 2026. It will be the third and final round of the 2025–26 24H Series Middle East.

== Schedule ==
Date	Time (local: GST)	Event	Distance
Friday, 16 January	10:30–12:30	Free practice	120 mins
Friday, 16 January	13:45–14:40	Qualifying sessions – class GT3	3 × 15 mins
Friday, 16 January	14:50–15:45	Qualifying sessions – class 992	3 × 15 mins
Friday, 16 January	15:55–16:50	Qualifying sessions – classes TCE, GT4 & GTX	3 × 15 mins
Friday, 16 January	17:20-17:45	Top 10 Shoot-Out	25 mins
Friday, 16 January	19:30–21:00	Night practice – All cars	90 mins
Saturday, 17 January	13:00	Race	24 hours
Sunday, 18 January	13:00	Race	24 hours

== Entries ==
No.	Entrant	Car	Driver 1	Driver 2	Driver 3	Driver 4	Driver 5
GT3 (13 entries)
4	(Australia) Grove Racing by GetSpeed	Mercedes-AMG GT3 Evo	(Australia) Kai Allen	(Andorra) Jules Gounon	(Australia) Brenton Grove	(Australia) Stephen Grove	(United Kingdom) Chris Lulham
14	(Austria) razoon - more than racing	Porsche 911 GT3 R (992)	(Denmark) Simon Birch	(France) Vladislav Lomko (Note: All following drivers are Russian, but Lomko competes under a French licence, Bukhantsov competes under a Kittitian licence, Geshev under a Montenegrin license, Minsky, Solukovtsev and Stanchin under a Kyrgyz license and Sorokin under a Portuguese license as Russian national emblems were banned by the FIA following the Russian invasion of Ukraine.)	(Austria) Leo Pichler	(Netherlands) Jop Rappange	(Austria) Luca Rettenbacher
16	(Germany) Winward Racing	Mercedes-AMG GT3 Evo	(Netherlands) "Daan Arrow"	(Germany) Maro Engel	Sergey Stolyarov (Note: All 19 drivers are Russian, but they compete as neutral competitors as Russian national emblems were banned by the FIA following the Russian invasion of Ukraine.)	(Germany) Luca Stolz	
27	(Belgium) Team WRT	BMW M4 GT3 Evo	(Kyrgyzstan) Stanislav Minsky	(Belgium) Mathieu Detry	(Germany) Christopher Haase	(Germany) Julian Hanses	(Germany) Thomas Kiefer
61	(New Zealand) EBM	Porsche 911 GT3 R (992)	(France) Dorian Boccolacci	(Malaysia) Adrian D'Silva	(France) Alessandro Ghiretti	(Italy) Enzo Trulli	
74	(United Kingdom) Optimum Motorsport	McLaren 720S GT3 Evo	(United Kingdom) Andrew Gilbert	(United Kingdom) Tom Fleming	(Denmark) Benjamin Goethe	(United Kingdom) Michael Porter	
77	(United Kingdom) Optimum Motorsport	McLaren 720S GT3 Evo	(United Kingdom) Harry George	(United States) Tanner Harvey	(United States) Patrick Liddy	(Netherlands) Dante Rappange	
81	(Germany) Winward Racing	Mercedes-AMG GT3 Evo	(Italy) Matteo Cairoli	(Germany) Marvin Dienst	(Italy) Gabriele Piana	Rinat Salikhov	
87	(Germany) Origine powered by CC	Porsche 911 GT3 R (992)	(China) Deng Yi	(Armenia) Artur Goroyan	(China) Leo Ye Hongli	Roman Mavlanov	(China) Yuan Bo
92	(Lithuania) Pure Rxcing	Porsche 911 GT3 R (992)	(Denmark) Michelle Gatting	(Austria) Max Hofer	(United Kingdom) Alex Malykhin (Note: Malykhin is Belarusian, but he competes under a British licence as Belarusian national emblems were banned by the FIA following the Russian invasion of Ukraine.)	Alexey Nesov	
669	(Belgium) Team WRT	BMW M4 GT3 Evo	(South Africa) Kelvin van der Linde	(United States) Anthony McIntosh	(South Africa) Jordan Pepper	(Spain) Fran Rueda	(United Kingdom) Ben Tuck
777	(Oman) AlManar Racing by Dragon	Ferrari 296 GT3	(Oman) Al Faisal Al Zubair	(United States) Dustin Blattner	(Zimbabwe) Axcil Jefferies	(Germany) Dennis Marschall	
991	(United Kingdom) Paradine Competition	BMW M4 GT3 Evo	(United Arab Emirates) Jamie Day	(Brazil) Pedro Ebrahim	(Brazil) Augusto Farfus	(United Kingdom) James Kellett	(United Kingdom) Darren Leung
GT3 Pro-Am (13 entries)
8	(New Zealand) EBM	Mercedes-AMG GT3 Evo	(China) Kerong Li	(Indonesia) Setiawan Santoso	(Thailand) Tanart Sathienthirakul	(Finland) Elias Seppänen	(China) Zhou Bihuang
10	(Germany) Herberth Motorsport	Porsche 911 GT3 R (992)	(Hong Kong) Antares Au	(Germany) Ralf Bohn	(Netherlands) Loek Hartog	(Germany) Joel Sturm	
13	(Germany) Team Motopark	Mercedes-AMG GT3 Evo	(Canada) Mikaël Grenier	(Australia) Christian Mansell	(Mexico) Marcelo A. Ramirez	Denis Remenyako	
17	(Italy) Enrico Fulgenzi Racing	Porsche 911 GT3 R (992)	(Italy) Enrico Fernando Fulgenzi	(Italy) Alessandro Giannone	(Italy) Andrea Girondi	(United Kingdom) Harley Haughton	
18	(France) Saintéloc Junior Team	Audi R8 LMS Evo II	(Austria) Michael Doppelmayr	(Germany) Elia Erhart	(Germany) Swen Herberger	(Germany) Pierre Kaffer	(France) Stephane Tribaudini
28	(France) TFT Racing	Mercedes-AMG GT3 Evo	(France) Jordan Boisson	(France) Patrick Charlaix	(France) Marvin Klein	(Belgium) Benjamin Paque	
31	(United Kingdom) Team Parker Racing	Mercedes-AMG GT3 Evo	(United Kingdom) Dario Franchitti	(United Kingdom) Robert Huff	(United Kingdom) Max Lynn	(United Kingdom) Shaun Lynn	
56	(Czech Republic) Scuderia Praha	Ferrari 296 GT3	(Czech Republic) Josef Král	(Slovakia) Matúš Výboh	(Slovakia) Miroslav Výboh	(Czech Republic) Dennis Waszek	(Italy) Matteo Malucelli
67	(Austria) SVC Sport Management	Mercedes-AMG GT3 Evo	(Switzerland) Mauro Calamia	(Switzerland) Jean-Luc D'Auria	(Italy) Roberto Pampanini	(Italy) Amedeo Pampanini	
79	(San Marino) Tsunami RT	Porsche 911 GT3 R (992)	(Italy) Fabio Babini	(Switzerland) Alex Fontana	(New Zealand) Daniel Gaunt	(Italy) Johannes Zelger	
88	(United Arab Emirates) Dragon Racing	Ferrari 296 GT3	(Italy) Giacomo Altoè	(Canada) Ramez Azzam	(Kuwait) Khaled Al Marzouq	(United Kingdom) Oscar Ryndziewcz	(Germany) Oliver Goethe
93	(India) Ajith RedAnt Racing	Mercedes-AMG GT3 Evo	(Belgium) Kobe de Breucker	(India) Ajith Kumar	(Belgium) Ayrton Redant	(Belgium) Yannick Redant	
269	(Germany) Herberth Motorsport	Porsche 911 GT3 R (992)	(Germany) Vincent Kolb	(Germany) Max Moritz	(Germany) Sven Müller	(Germany) Florian Spengler	
GT3 Am (8 entries)
2	(Antigua and Barbuda) HAAS RT	Audi R8 LMS Evo II	(Saint Kitts and Nevis) Alexander Bukhantsov	(Poland) Damian Ciosek	(Montenegro) Alim Geshev	(United Kingdom) George King	(United Kingdom) James Winslow
11	(Switzerland) HOFOR Racing	Mercedes-AMG GT3 Evo	(Germany) Torsten Kratz	(Germany) Manuel Metzger	(Germany) Maximilian Partl	(Switzerland) Chantal Prinz	(Switzerland) Alexander Prinz
21	(Antigua and Barbuda) HAAS RT	Audi R8 LMS Evo II	(Belgium) Fabian Duffieux	(Belgium) Peter Guelinckx	(Belgium) Nicolas Guelinckx	(Belgium) Matisse Lismont	
24	(Italy) Dinamic GT	Porsche 911 GT3 R (992)	(Spain) Rafael Duran	(Canada) Reinhold Krahn	(Sri Lanka) Eshan Pieris	(Austria) Philipp Sager	(United Kingdom) Angus Whiteside
25	(South Africa) Into Africa by Dragon Racing	Ferrari 296 GT3	(United Kingdom) Glynn Geddie	(United Kingdom) Jim Geddie	(South Africa) Xolile Letlaka	(South Africa) Arnold Neveling	(South Africa) Stuart White
69	(United Arab Emirates) Continental Racing with Simpson Motorsport	Audi R8 LMS Evo II	(Germany) Alex Aka	(Malta) Paul Scheuschner	Mikhail Simonov	(Kyrgyzstan) Andrey Solukovtsev	(Cyprus) Vasily Vladykin
89	(Germany) Lionspeed GP	Porsche 911 GT3 R (992)	(Belgium) Xavier Knauf	(Australia) Andres Latorre	(Luxembourg) Gabriel Rindone	(Belgium) Gregory Servais	
992	(United Kingdom) Paradine Competition	BMW M4 GT3 Evo	(Oman) Ahmad Al Harthy	(United Kingdom) James Kellett	(United Kingdom) Darren Leung	(United States) Anthony McIntosh	
GTX (6 entries)
701	(France) Vortex V8	Vortex 2.0	(France) Lionel Amrouche	(France) Philippe Bonnel	(France) Thierry Chkondali	(Belgium) Johan Caeldries	
710	(Germany) Leipert Motorsport	Lamborghini Huracán Super Trofeo Evo 2	(New Zealand) Brendon Leitch	(Canada) Fred Roberts	(Sweden) Månz Thalin	(United States) Gerhard Watzinger	(United States) Don Yount
763	GT3 Poland	Lamborghini Huracán Super Trofeo Evo 2	(Latvia) Konstantīns Calko	(Poland) Pawel Kowalski	(Poland) Adrian Lewandowski	(Poland) Andrzej Lewandowski	(Poland) Seweryn Mazur
794	(France) Team CMR	Lamborghini Huracán Super Trofeo Evo 2	(Belgium) Rodrigue Gillion	(France) Hugo Mogica	(France) Eric Mouez	(Belgium) Erwin Creed	(France) Ethan Gialdini
795	(France) Team CMR	Ginetta G56 GT2	(France) Nico Prost	(United Kingdom) Michael Simpson	(United Kingdom) Lawrence Tomlinson		
797	(France) Rossa Racing	Rossa LM GT	(Uzbekistan) Ismail Ahmedkhodjaev	(United Arab Emirates) Amna Al Qubaisi	Viacheslav Gutak	(Cyprus) Evgeny Kireev	Roman Rusinov
992 (14 entries)
216	(Hong Kong) Modena Motorsports	Porsche 992 GT3 Cup	(Canada) Christian Chia	(France) Philippe Descombes	(Canada) John Shen	(Denmark) Benny Simonsen	(Netherlands) Francis Tjia
888	(France) SebLajoux Racing	Porsche 992 GT3 Cup	(Kazakhstan) Alexandr Artemyev	(France) Sebastien Lajoux	(France) Stephane Perrin	(France) Louis Perrot	(United Kingdom) Anthony Vince
909	(Netherlands) RedCamel-Jordans.nl	Porsche 992 GT3 Cup	(Netherlands) Ivo Breukers	(Netherlands) Luc Breukers	(Netherlands) Rik Breukers	(Switzerland) Fabian Danz	
910	(France) SebLajoux Racing	Porsche 992 GT3 Cup	(France) Solenn Amrouche	(France) Enzo Joulié	(France) Sebastien Lajoux	(France) Mathys Jaubert	
914	(Austria) razoon - more than racing	Porsche 992 GT3 Cup	(Germany) Colin Bönighausen	(Kyrgyzstan) Ivan Stanchin	(Austria) Daniel Drexel	Ivan Ovsienko	
921	(Belgium) Mühlner Motorsport	Porsche 992 GT3 Cup	(Netherlands) Jurriaan de Back	(China) Liang Jiatong	(Netherlands) Paul Meijer		
928	(Germany) HRT Performance	Porsche 992 GT3 Cup	(France) Stéphane Adler	(France) Michael Blanchemain	(France) Jérôme Da Costa	(South Africa) Ryan Naicker	
929	(Germany) HRT Performance	Porsche 992 GT3 Cup	(United Kingdom) Steven Gambrell	(United States) Gregg Gorski	(United Arab Emirates) Giovanni Nucera	(Switzerland) Silvain Pastoris	
930	(Germany) X Motorsport by HRT Performance	Porsche 992 GT3 Cup	Ilya Gorin	(Portugal) Igor Sorokin	Sergey Titarenko	Victor Titarenko	
931	(Germany) ARMotors by HRT Performance	Porsche 992 GT3 Cup	Grigorii Burlutskii	(United Kingdom) Nick Halstead	(Germany) Maya Hartge	(Germany) Alex Renner	Dmitriy Shishko
939	(Netherlands) Team GP-Elite	Porsche 992 GT3 Cup	(Finland) Jukka Honkavuori	(Finland) Jukka Honkavuori	(Finland) Jani Käkelä	(Estonia) Thomas Kangro	(Finland) Henri Tuomaala
962	(Switzerland) Tierra Outdoor Racing by Fach Auto Tech	Porsche 992 GT3 Cup	(Netherlands) Wouter Boerekamps	(Netherlands) Huub van Eijndhoven	(Netherlands) Robert de Haan	(Netherlands) Ralph Poppelaars	
971	(United Arab Emirates) Rabdan by Fulgenzi	Porsche 992 GT3 Cup	(United Arab Emirates) Saif Alameri	(United Arab Emirates) Salem Alketbi	(Switzerland) Christopher Zöchling	(United States) Arthur Simondet	
985	(Austria) Neuhofer by Rennsport	Porsche 992 GT3 Cup	(Austria) Felix Neuhofer	(Austria) Markus Neuhofer	(Austria) Martin Ragginger	(Austria) Helmut Roedig	(Germany) Sebastian Schmitt
992 Am (2 entries)
924	(Belgium) Red Ant Racing	Porsche 992 GT3 Cup	(Belgium) Simon Balcaen	(Belgium) Mathieu Castelein	(Belgium) Pierre Castelein	(France) Steven Palette	
925	(France) Crubilé Sport	Porsche 992 GT3 Cup	(France) Sebastién Crubile	(France) Pascal Duhamel	(France) Anthony Plessis		
GT4 (4 entries)
427	(Germany) Team Sorg Rennsport	Porsche 718 Cayman GT4 RS Clubsport	(Germany) Nick von Essen	(Mexico) Benito Tagle	(Germany) Stephan Epp	Roman Tishchenkov	
444	(France) Circuit Toys	Toyota GR Supra GT4 Evo2	(United Kingdom) Rhys Lloyd	(United Kingdom) Will Powell			
445	(Germany) Cerny Motorsport	BMW M4 GT4 Evo (G82)	(France) Joshua Bednarski	Ivan Krapivtsev	(Germany) Farin Megger	(United Kingdom) Shiv Sapra	
478	(United Kingdom) CWS Engineering	Ginetta G56 GT4 Evo	(Australia) Mark Griffith	(Australia) Neale Muston	(United Kingdom) Colin White		
TCX (5 entries)
101	(Germany) asBest Racing	SEAT León Cup Racer	(Switzerland) Thomas Alpiger	(United Arab Emirates) Ahmed Al Khaja	(Bangladesh) Hm Tauhid Anwar Avik	(India) Fahad Nasir Khan	(Switzerland) Michael Neuhauser
102	(Germany) asBest Racing	Cupra León TCR	(Germany) Pia Ohlsson	(Germany) Lutz Obermann	(Brazil) Silas Passos	(Germany) Henrik Seibel	(Japan) Junichi Umemoto
103	(Germany) asBest Racing	Volkswagen Golf GTI TCR	(United Arab Emirates) Ahmed Al Melaihi	(United Arab Emirates) Mohammed Al Owais	(Poland) Rafal Gieras	(United Arab Emirates) Karim Zuhour	(United Arab Emirates) Nadir Zuhour
111	(Germany) asBest Racing	Porsche 718 Cayman GT4 Clubsport	(Switzerland) Marco Grillil	(India) Zaamin Jaffer	(Germany) Desirée Müller	(South Africa) Dylan Pragji	(Lebanon) Rawad Sarieddine
127	(Germany) Team Sorg Rennsport	Porsche 718 Cayman GT4 Clubsport	(Germany) Darian Donkel	Ivan Ekelchik	Azat Kalimullin	Nikita Kulkov	(Germany) Aaron Wenisch
TC (2 entries)
107	(Japan) TGRR	Toyota GR Supra GT4 Evo "B-Spec"	(Japan) Miki Onaga	(Japan) Aimi Saito	(Japan) Rami Sasaki	(Japan) Kokoro Sato	(Japan) Rio Shimono
108	(Hong Kong) KCMG	Toyota GR Supra GT4 Evo "B-Spec"	(Hong Kong) Paul Ip	(Hong Kong) Marchy Lee	(Hong Kong) Ho-Pin Tung	(Hong Kong) Andy Yan	

== Qualifying ==
Pole positions in each class are denoted in bold.

=== GT3 ===
Fastest in class in **bold**.

Pos.	Class	No.	Team	Fastest lap from Qualifying 1, 2 and 3	Top Qualifying	Grid

=== 992 ===
Fastest in class in **bold**.

Pos.	Class	No.	Team	Fastest lap from Qualifying 1, 2 and 3	Grid

=== GTX, GT4 & TCX ===
Fastest in class in **bold**.

Pos.	Class	No.	Team	Fastest lap from Qualifying 1, 2 and 3	Grid

== Race results ==
Class winner in bold.

Pos	Class	No.	Team	Drivers	Chassis	Time/Reason	Laps	Points
Pos	Class	No.	Team	Drivers	Engine	Time/Reason	Laps	Points

== Notes ==
24H Series Middle East
Previous race: 6 Hours of Abu Dhabi	2026 season	Next race: none
