= 2025 Kyojo Cup season =

Formula 4 championship held in 2025

The 2025 Kyojo Cup season was the ninth season of the Kyojo Cup, promoted by Inter Proto Motorsports Co., Ltd.

This is the first season using the Hybrid KCMG KC MG-01, previously used in the 2019 and 2022 FIA Motorsport Games Formula 4 Cups. The FCR-VITA01, which was used from 2017 to 2024, will continue to race in the FCR-Vita series.

== Teams and drivers ==
All teams competed with an identical KCMG KC MG-01 chassis and Abarth 1.4-litre turbocharged hybrid engine, with Bridgestone as the tire supplier for the series.

Team	No.	Driver	Rounds
(Japan) BigBoss W Team TOM'S	1	(Japan) Aimi Saito	All
(Japan) BigBoss W Team TOM'S	37	(United States) Hana Burton	All
(Japan) docomo business ROOKIE	4	(Japan) Mako Hirakawa	All
(Hong Kong) Kids com Team KCMG	7	(Japan) Miki Onaga	All
(Hong Kong) Kids com Team KCMG	8	(Japan) Rami Sasaki	All
(Hong Kong) Kids com Team KCMG	9	(United States) Kelsey Pinkowski	All
(Hong Kong) Kids com Team KCMG	10	(Japan) Reina Amaya	1–2
(Hong Kong) Kids com Team KCMG	10	(Finland) Flame Airikkala	3–5
(Japan) Fujisan Shizuoka Racing	12	(Japan) Yuika Hosokawa	All
(Japan) AiWin Re-Kobe	17	(Japan) Itsumo Shiraishi	All
(Japan) Mihara Racing Team	32	(Japan) Kilei Kanemoto	All
(Japan) Fukuda Racing	33	(Japan) Marie Iwaoka	All
(Japan) Optimus Cerumo・INGING (Note: Cars No. 38 and No. 39 entered as Team Optimus Cerumo・INGING, cars No. 59 entered as INGING 2W zoomies Singha Sittipol Nexzter) (Thailand) INGING 2W zoomies Singha Sittipol Nexzter	38	(Japan) Kokoro Sato	All
(Japan) Optimus Cerumo・INGING (Thailand) INGING 2W zoomies Singha Sittipol Nexzter	39	(Japan) Riona Tomishita	All
(Japan) Optimus Cerumo・INGING (Thailand) INGING 2W zoomies Singha Sittipol Nexzter	59	(Thailand) Sitarvee Limnantharak	All
(Japan) Dojo Racing	46	(Japan) Ayumu Nagai	All
(Japan) TGM Grand Prix	53	(Japan) Miku Ikejima	All
(Japan) TGM Grand Prix	55	(Japan) Maaya Orido	All
(Japan) ATeam Buzz Racing	57	(China) Zhao Yunqing	All
(Japan) Itochu Enex Wecars Team Impul with Dr.Dry	86	(Japan) Rio Shimono	All
(Japan) Autolook Racing	87	(Japan) Ryu Yamamoto	All

== Calendar and results ==
The provisional calendar for 2025 was confirmed on 8 September 2024, which consists of five rounds all taking place at Fuji Speedway. The official dates were confirmed in mid-January. The series announced there will be 2 races in each round, with Sprint race held on Saturday which consists of 10 laps to determine as well for the Feature race grid, and Feature race on Sunday consists of 12 laps.

Round		Circuit	Date	Pole position	Fastest lap	Winning driver	Winning team	Supporting
1	SR	(Shizuoka Prefecture) Fuji Speedway	10 May	(Japan) Rio Shimono	(Japan) Rio Shimono	(Japan) Rio Shimono	(Japan) Itochu Enex Wecars Team Impul with Dr.Dry	Fuji Champion Race Series; Inter Proto Series
1	FR	(Shizuoka Prefecture) Fuji Speedway	11 May		(Japan) Rio Shimono	(Japan) Rio Shimono	(Japan) Itochu Enex Wecars Team Impul with Dr.Dry	Fuji Champion Race Series; Inter Proto Series
2	SR	(Shizuoka Prefecture) Fuji Speedway	19 July	(Japan) Aimi Saito	(Japan) Aimi Saito	(Japan) Aimi Saito	(Japan) BigBoss W Team TOM'S	Super Formula; Porsche Carrera Cup Japan
2	FR	(Shizuoka Prefecture) Fuji Speedway	20 July		(Japan) Miki Onaga	(Japan) Miki Onaga	(Hong Kong) Kids com Team KCMG	Super Formula; Porsche Carrera Cup Japan
3	SR	(Shizuoka Prefecture) Fuji Speedway	16 August	(Japan) Aimi Saito	(Japan) Aimi Saito	(Japan) Rio Shimono	(Japan) Itochu Enex Wecars Team Impul with Dr.Dry	Fuji Champion Race Series; Inter Proto Series
3	FR	(Shizuoka Prefecture) Fuji Speedway	17 August		(Japan) Miki Onaga	(Japan) Rio Shimono	(Japan) Itochu Enex Wecars Team Impul with Dr.Dry	Fuji Champion Race Series; Inter Proto Series
4	SR	(Shizuoka Prefecture) Fuji Speedway	11 October	(Japan) Rio Shimono	(Japan) Miki Onaga	(Japan) Rio Shimono	(Japan) Itochu Enex Wecars Team Impul with Dr.Dry	Super Formula; Honda N-One Owner's Cup
4	FR	(Shizuoka Prefecture) Fuji Speedway	12 October		(Japan) Rio Shimono	(Japan) Rio Shimono	(Japan) Itochu Enex Wecars Team Impul with Dr.Dry	Super Formula; Honda N-One Owner's Cup
5	SR	(Shizuoka Prefecture) Fuji Speedway	8 November	(Japan) Rio Shimono	(Japan) Miki Onaga	(Japan) Rio Shimono	(Japan) Itochu Enex Wecars Team Impul with Dr.Dry	Fuji Champion Race Series; Inter Proto Series
5	FR	(Shizuoka Prefecture) Fuji Speedway	9 November		(Japan) Rio Shimono	(Japan) Rio Shimono	(Japan) Itochu Enex Wecars Team Impul with Dr.Dry	Fuji Champion Race Series; Inter Proto Series

== Season summary ==
=== Round one ===
Round one of the season took place between 9–11 May. Qualifying and the sprint race took place on 10 May, with rainy and low visibility conditions lasting throughout the day. Rio Shimono took pole position, Hana Burton took second with a time 20 milliseconds slower than Shimono, and Miki Onaga qualified third. The sprint race started under a safety car due to damp conditions. The safety car ended after 2 laps, with Onaga moving up to second and Burton falling to fifth. On the second to last lap, Maaya Orido and Yuika Hosokawa collided, with the prior retiring from the race and the latter continuing, although a lap down. Shimono finished the race in first, ahead of Onaga and Mako Hirakawa, who were 9.638 seconds and 12.152 seconds behind Shimono, respectively.

With the feature race's start grid being set by the sprint race's finishing order, Shimono started the feature race in first. Halfway through the race, Kokoro Sato overtook Hirakawa for third place. Hirakawa continued to lose multiple positions, but was able to finish fourth. TOM'S driver Aimi Saito gained multiple places throughout the race, finishing in seventh. With Sato holding onto third, Onaga maintained second place, finishing 9.175 seconds behind Shimono. Shimono had a dominant weekend, claiming both race victories and achieving the maximum possible points for the round.

=== Round two ===
Round two of the season took place during 19–20 July. Aimi Saito took pole position ahead of Onaga (who received a three position grid penalty) and Shimono. Shimono overtook Saito for the lead at the start of the race, with Onaga also making her way into third following her grid demotion to fifth. Saito regained the lead of the race after Shimono made an error, with Onaga later overtaking Shimono for second place. Saito continued her lead until the end, marking her first victory of the season. Kokoro Sato and Itsumo Shiraishi finished in fourth and fifth, respectively.

Saito maintained her position to start on pole for the feature race, with a much better start compared to the previous race. The safety car was brought out due to incidents at the end of lap one that involved Ryu Yamamoto, Reina Amaya, Maaya Orido and Kelsey Pinkowski. During the safety car restart on lap four, Onaga managed to overtake Saito for the lead of the race. Onaga went on to win the race, putting her in the lead of the drivers' championship. Saito and Shimono maintained their positions in second and third, respectively. Ayumu Nagai finished in fourth, while Riona Tomishita finished in fifth. Hana Burton made a notable recovery drive during the race, finishing the race in eighth after starting 20th.

=== Round three ===
Round three of the season took place during 16–17 August. Aimi Saito once again took pole position during qualifying, ahead of Itsumo Shiraishi and Shimono. Saito maintained the lead at the start of the race, with Shimono overtaking Shiraishi for second. Rain hit the track during lap four, with Saito spinning out and colliding with the barrier as multiple other drivers further back also spun. Despite all cars being able to continue, a red flag was issued for the race. The race was resumed following two laps under a safety car, with Shimono her gap ahead. Shiraishi dropped down to fourth, with Hirakawa finishing in second and Tomishita finishing in third. Championship leader Onaga finished in sixteenth after receiving a 30 second time penalty for a false start.

During the feature race, Shimono held on to her lead ahead of Hirkawa and Tomishita. On the third lap, Rami Sasaki overtook Tomishita for third place, and later overtook Hirkawa for second on lap six. Tomishita regained third place on lap ten. Hirakawa and Sato finished fourth and fifth, while Onaga managed to climb to sixth after starting from 16th. Shimono's double win during the round made her become the new championship leader, coming out with 26 more points than Onaga.

=== Round four ===
Round four of the season took place between 11–12 October. Qualifying was held in wet conditions, with a red flag being issued due to Sato crashing at 100R. Shimono took pole position ahead of Sasaki and Onaga. It continued to rain at the track for the sprint race, leading to the first three laps being completed behind the safety car. After the session was green flagged, the race included many drivers spinning and going wide. Onega overtook Sasaki for second place later on in the race, with Shimono holding on to the lead to mark her fifth victory of the season and extending her lead in the championship to 29 points. Shiraishi finished in fourth and Saito finished in fifth.

Shimono maintained her lead during the feature race which was held on a damp track. Saito moved up from fifth to second throughout the race, ahead of Onaga and Sasaki. Tomishita, who started the race in ninth, advanced to third as a result of an overtake at TGR corner on the last lap of the race. Shimono maintained the lead of the race until the chequered flag, taking her sixth win of the season and her maiden Kyojo Cup championship. Onaga and Sato finished in fourth and fifth, respectively.

=== Round five ===
Round five of the season took place between 8–9 November. During qualifying, Shimono took pole position ahead of Saito and Onaga. Onaga overtook Saito for second position at the start of the race. A collision between Hirakawa and Shiraishi at turn 3 triggered a multi car pileup involving numerous other cars. A safety car was deployed, and racing resumed on lap six. Shimono went on to win the race ahead of Onaga and Saito, with Sasaki and Sato finishing in fourth and fifth, respectively.

Shimono held her lead during a wet feature race, with the first three laps being completed behind the safety car. There were no position changes within the top five throughout the race, with Onaga and Saito holding on second and third and Sasaki and Sato holding onto fourth and fifth. Shimono won the race over nine seconds ahead of Onaga, who claimed second in the championship. Shimono won eight races throughout the season, only missing out on victories during round two.

== Championship standings ==
Sprint race points

Position	**1st**	**2nd**	**3rd**	**4th**	**5th**	**6th**	**7th**	**8th**
Points	10	8	6	5	4	3	2	1

Feature race points

Position	**1st**	**2nd**	**3rd**	**4th**	**5th**	**6th**	**7th**	**8th**	**9th**	**10th**
Points	20	15	11	8	6	5	4	3	2	1

Qualifying points

Position	**1st**	**2nd**	**3rd**
Points	3	2	1

=== Drivers' championship ===
Pos	Driver	FUJ1		FUJ2		FUJ3		FUJ4		FUJ5		Points
Pos	Driver	SR	FR	SR	FR	SR	FR	SR	FR	SR	FR	Points
1	(Japan) Rio Shimono	**1**^{1}	1	3^{2}	3	1^{3}	1	**1**^{1}	1	**1**^{1}	**1**	149
2	(Japan) Miki Onaga	2^{3}	2	2	1	16	6	2^{3}	4	2^{3}	2	98
3	(Japan) Aimi Saito	14	7	**1**^{1}	2	**19**^{1}	10	5	2	3^{2}	3	74
4	(Japan) Kokoro Sato	4	3	4	6	6	5	3	5	5	5	57
5	(Japan) Rami Sasaki	7	6	9	19	5	2	11^{2}	9	4	4	43
6	(Japan) Mako Hirakawa	3	4	10	12	2	4	10	8	13	7	37
7	(Japan) Riona Tomishita	9	11	7	5	3	3	9	3	Ret	12	36
8	(Japan) Itsumo Shiraishi	12	10	5	7	4^{2}	17	4	6	Ret	10	27
9	(United States) Hana Burton	6^{2}	9	Ret^{3}	8	12	14	8	10	6	6	21
10	(Japan) Ayumu Nagai	5	8	6	4	17	16	18	12	Ret	16	18
11	(Japan) Kilei Kanemoto	8	5	11	15	8	7	7	7	Ret	11	18
12	(Japan) Miku Ikejima	10	12	8	9	7	8	6	17	DNS	13	11
13	(Japan) Marie Iwaoka	11	14	12	10	13	13	14	11	8	8	5
14	(Japan) Ryu Yamamoto	18	18	14	18	20	15	15	14	7	14	2
15	(Thailand) Sitarvee Limnantharak	13	13	13	11	10	9	20	18	10	18	2
16	(Japan) Yuika Hosokawa	20	16	17	14	11	12	16	16	11	9	2
17	(Japan) Maaya Orido	19	20	15	13	15	11	12	13	9	17	0
18	(Finland) Flame Airikkala					9	18	13	15	Ret	15	0
19	(China) Zhao Yunqing	15	19	19	16	18	19	19	19	12	19	0
20	(United States) Kelsey Pinkowski	16	17	18	17	14	20	17	20	Ret	Ret	0
21	(Japan) Reina Amaya	17	15	17	Ret							0
Pos	Driver	SR	FR	SR	FR	SR	FR	SR	FR	SR	FR	Points
Pos	Driver	FUJ1		FUJ2		FUJ3		FUJ4		FUJ5		Points

Key
Colour	Result
Gold	Winner
Silver	Second place
Bronze	Third place
Green	Other points position
Blue	Other classified position
Blue	Not classified, finished (NC)
Purple	Not classified, retired (Ret)
Red	Did not qualify (DNQ)
Red	Did not pre-qualify (DNPQ)
Black	Disqualified (DSQ)
White	Did not start (DNS)
White	Race cancelled (C)
Blank	Did not practice (DNP)
Blank	Excluded (EX)
Blank	Did not arrive (DNA)
Blank	Withdrawn (WD)
Blank	Did not enter (cell empty)
Text formatting	Meaning
**Bold**	Pole position
Italics	Fastest lap
