= 2024 Australian Formula Open =

Motor racing competition

The 2024 Giti Australian Formula Open was a multi-event open-wheel single seater motor racing championship. This was the second season of the championship, founded by two-time Australian Gold Star winner Tim Macrow in 2023 as a direct successor to the Australian Formula 3 championship.

Tim Macrow Racing driver Ryan MacMillan won the AFO1 class title at the penultimate round of the season. Matthew Roesler (State Fleet Services) claimed the AFO2 title at the beginning of the final round, while Chris Huang, also driving for Tim Macrow Racing, won the AFO3 title by virtue of being the only competitor in the class for the first six rounds. Isaac McNeill, driving for Volante Rosso, won the AFO4 Class title after he won every race he took part in throughout the first five rounds.

== Teams and drivers ==
The championship was structured in four classes. AFO1 encompassed all Formula 3 machinery, with several chassis and engine manufacturers represented. AFO2 catered to Toyota Racing Series, Formula Renault and older F3 cars. AFO3 served all other invitational entries, while AFO4 is reserved for Formula 4 cars. All cars ran on Giti tires, and all drivers and teams were Australian-registered.

| Team | No. | Car | Driver | Rounds |
AFO1 entries
| Tim Macrow Racing | 1 | Dallara F312 | Trent Grubel | 1, 4 |
| Tim Macrow Racing | 9 | Dallara F308/11 | Miles Bromley | 1–5, 7 |
| Tim Macrow Racing | 9 | Dallara F308/11 | Thomas Gallagher | 6–7 |
| Tim Macrow Racing | 21 | Dallara F308/11 | Ryan MacMillan | All |
| Tim Macrow Racing | 22 | Dallara F308/11 | Beau Russell | 1–5 |
| Ruff Racing | 3 | Mygale M11 | Gerrit Ruff | 1 |
| Gilmour Racing | 3 | Dallara F307 | Chris Gilmour | 5 |
| Gilmour Racing | 17 | Dallara F308/11 | Kyle Evans | All |
| TWS Motorsport | 14 | Mygale M11 | Trent Shirvington | 3 |
| GK Racing | 23 | Dallara F304 | George Kantzios | 1–4 |
| Nathan Beer and Associates | 24 | Dallara F307 | Nathan Beer | 6–7 |
| 99 Motorsport | 99 | Dallara F308/11 | Ryan Astley | 1 |
AFO2 entries
| State Fleet Services | 4 | Tatuus FT-50 | Matthew Roesler | 1–2, 4, 6–7 |
| Team Penrite/Baker Motorsport | 12 | Dallara F399 | Rodney Baker | 6 |
| Co Machining | 21 | Dallara F302 | Graeme Holmes | 6 |
| Sydney Photo Booth Racing | 23 | Dallara F304 | Lawrence Katsidis | 6 |
| GK Racing | 23 | Dallara F304 | George Kantzios | 7 |
| GK Racing | 27 | Dallara F304 | George Kantzios | 5–6 |
| DiBiase Carpentry | 27 | Tatuus FT-50 | Paul DiBiase | 4 (Note: DiBiase sustained an injury and had to withdraw after second practice. Ruff replaced him for the rest of round 4.), 7 |
| DiBiase Carpentry | 27 | Tatuus FT-50 | Gerrit Ruff | 4 (Note: DiBiase sustained an injury and had to withdraw after second practice. Ruff replaced him for the rest of round 4.) |
| Glass Benders | 50 | Dallara F302 | Rodney Brincat | 6 |
| ARB Bundaberg | 51 | Dallara F399 | Ron Bennet | 6 |
| TCM Race Services | 53 | Tatuus FT-50 | Matthew Woodland | 1, 4 |
| Jetforms.com.au | 93 | Tatuus FT-50 | Christopher Slusarski | 1, 4, 7 |
| SMJ Plastering | 95 | Dallara F301 | Shayne Morrow | 6 |
AFO3 entries
| Tim Macrow Racing | 16 | Tatuus F3 T-318 | Chris Huang | 3–4, 7 |
AFO4 entries
| Tim Macrow Racing | 3 | Tatuus F4-T014 | Hunter Salvatore | 7 |
| Tim Macrow Racing | 25 | Mygale M14-F4 | Joanne Ciconte | 1 |
| Tim Macrow Racing | 25 | Mygale M14-F4 | Ryan Sorensen | 5 |
| Tim Macrow Racing | 43 | Mygale M14-F4 | Jayden Hamilton | 1–3, 5–7 |
| Volante Rosso | 11 | Tatuus F4-T014 | Isaac McNeill | 1–3, 5, 7 |
| AGI Sport | 40 | Mygale M14-F4 | Tim Bodyle | 3 |
| BF Racing | 88 | Mygale M14-F4 | Lachlan Evennett | 4, 7 |

== Race calendar ==
The 2024 calendar was first announced on 23 November 2023. It consisted of seven rounds across six circuits mainly situated in southeast Australia, one more than in 2023 as a second round at Sydney Motorsport Park was added.

| Round | | Circuit | Date | Support bill | Map of circuit locations |
|---|---|---|---|---|---|
| 1 | R1 | (Victoria (state)) Sandown Raceway; Melbourne, Victoria | 10 February | SpeedSeries; TCR Australia Touring Car Series; National Trans Am Series; Australian Production Cars | 2024 Australian Formula Open is located in Australia |
| 1 | R2 | (Victoria (state)) Sandown Raceway; Melbourne, Victoria | 11 February | SpeedSeries; TCR Australia Touring Car Series; National Trans Am Series; Australian Production Cars | 2024 Australian Formula Open is located in Australia |
| 1 | R3 | (Victoria (state)) Sandown Raceway; Melbourne, Victoria | 11 February | SpeedSeries; TCR Australia Touring Car Series; National Trans Am Series; Australian Production Cars | 2024 Australian Formula Open is located in Australia |
| 2 | R1 | (Victoria (state)) Winton Motor Raceway; Winton, Victoria | 27 April | NSW State Championships; NSW Formula Car Championship; Australian Formula Ford Series; RX8 Cup Australia | 2024 Australian Formula Open is located in Australia |
| 2 | R2 | (Victoria (state)) Winton Motor Raceway; Winton, Victoria | 28 April | NSW State Championships; NSW Formula Car Championship; Australian Formula Ford Series; RX8 Cup Australia | 2024 Australian Formula Open is located in Australia |
| 2 | R3 | (Victoria (state)) Winton Motor Raceway; Winton, Victoria | 28 April | NSW State Championships; NSW Formula Car Championship; Australian Formula Ford Series; RX8 Cup Australia | 2024 Australian Formula Open is located in Australia |
| 3 | R1 | Sydney Motorsport Park; Eastern Creek, New South Wales | 25 May | NSW State Championships; NSW Formula Car Championship; Australian Formula Ford Series; RX8 Cup Australia | 2024 Australian Formula Open is located in Australia |
| 3 | R2 | Sydney Motorsport Park; Eastern Creek, New South Wales | 26 May | NSW State Championships; NSW Formula Car Championship; Australian Formula Ford Series; RX8 Cup Australia | 2024 Australian Formula Open is located in Australia |
| 3 | R3 | Sydney Motorsport Park; Eastern Creek, New South Wales | 26 May | NSW State Championships; NSW Formula Car Championship; Australian Formula Ford Series; RX8 Cup Australia | 2024 Australian Formula Open is located in Australia |
| 4 | R1 | The Bend Motorsport Park; Tailem Bend, South Australia | 8 June | Formula 4 Australian Championship; Lamborghini Super Trofeo Asia; Radical Cup Australia; Australian Prototype Series | 2024 Australian Formula Open is located in Australia |
| 4 | R2 | The Bend Motorsport Park; Tailem Bend, South Australia | 9 June | Formula 4 Australian Championship; Lamborghini Super Trofeo Asia; Radical Cup Australia; Australian Prototype Series | 2024 Australian Formula Open is located in Australia |
| 4 | R3 | The Bend Motorsport Park; Tailem Bend, South Australia | 9 June | Formula 4 Australian Championship; Lamborghini Super Trofeo Asia; Radical Cup Australia; Australian Prototype Series | 2024 Australian Formula Open is located in Australia |
| 5 | R1 | Queensland Raceway; Willowbank, Queensland | 3 August | GT World Challenge Australia; TCR Australia Touring Car Series; GT4 Australia Series; Porsche Sprint Challenge Australia | 2024 Australian Formula Open is located in Australia |
| 5 | R2 | Queensland Raceway; Willowbank, Queensland | 4 August | GT World Challenge Australia; TCR Australia Touring Car Series; GT4 Australia Series; Porsche Sprint Challenge Australia | 2024 Australian Formula Open is located in Australia |
| 5 | R3 | Queensland Raceway; Willowbank, Queensland | 4 August | GT World Challenge Australia; TCR Australia Touring Car Series; GT4 Australia Series; Porsche Sprint Challenge Australia | 2024 Australian Formula Open is located in Australia |
| 6 | R1 | Sydney Motorsport Park; Eastern Creek, New South Wales | 19 October | GT World Challenge Australia; TCR Australia Touring Car Series; GT4 Australia Series; Porsche Sprint Challenge Australia | 2024 Australian Formula Open is located in Australia |
| 6 | R2 | Sydney Motorsport Park; Eastern Creek, New South Wales | 20 October | GT World Challenge Australia; TCR Australia Touring Car Series; GT4 Australia Series; Porsche Sprint Challenge Australia | 2024 Australian Formula Open is located in Australia |
| 6 | R3 | Sydney Motorsport Park; Eastern Creek, New South Wales | 20 October | GT World Challenge Australia; TCR Australia Touring Car Series; GT4 Australia Series; Porsche Sprint Challenge Australia | 2024 Australian Formula Open is located in Australia |
| 7 | R1 | (Victoria (state)) Phillip Island Grand Prix Circuit; Ventnor, Victoria | 23 November | Island Magic; Victoria State Championships; Formula Vee Australian Series; Porsche 944 Challenge | 2024 Australian Formula Open is located in Australia |
| 7 | R2 | (Victoria (state)) Phillip Island Grand Prix Circuit; Ventnor, Victoria | 24 November | Island Magic; Victoria State Championships; Formula Vee Australian Series; Porsche 944 Challenge | 2024 Australian Formula Open is located in Australia |
| 7 | R3 | (Victoria (state)) Phillip Island Grand Prix Circuit; Ventnor, Victoria | 24 November | Island Magic; Victoria State Championships; Formula Vee Australian Series; Porsche 944 Challenge | 2024 Australian Formula Open is located in Australia |

== Race results ==
| Round | | Circuit | Pole position | Fastest lap | AFO1 winner | AFO2 winner | AFO3 winner | AFO4 winner |
|---|---|---|---|---|---|---|---|---|
| 1 | R1 | (Victoria (state)) Sandown Raceway | Miles Bromley | Miles Bromley | Miles Bromley | Christopher Slusarski | no entries | Isaac McNeill |
| 1 | R2 | (Victoria (state)) Sandown Raceway | | Miles Bromley | Miles Bromley | Matthew Roesler | no entries | Isaac McNeill |
| 1 | R3 | (Victoria (state)) Sandown Raceway | | Ryan MacMillan | Kyle Evans | Christopher Slusarski | no entries | Isaac McNeill |
| 2 | R1 | (Victoria (state)) Winton Motor Raceway | Ryan MacMillan | Miles Bromley | Miles Bromley | Matthew Roesler | no entries | Isaac McNeill |
| 2 | R2 | (Victoria (state)) Winton Motor Raceway | | Ryan MacMillan | Miles Bromley | Matthew Roesler | no entries | Isaac McNeill |
| 2 | R3 | (Victoria (state)) Winton Motor Raceway | | Miles Bromley | Ryan MacMillan | Matthew Roesler | no entries | Isaac McNeill |
| 3 | R1 | (New South Wales) Sydney Motorsport Park | Beau Russell | Miles Bromley | Ryan MacMillan | no entries | Chris Huang | Isaac McNeill |
| 3 | R2 | (New South Wales) Sydney Motorsport Park | | Ryan MacMillan | Ryan MacMillan | no entries | no classified finishers | Isaac McNeill |
| 3 | R3 | (New South Wales) Sydney Motorsport Park | | Ryan MacMillan | Miles Bromley | no entries | Chris Huang | Isaac McNeill |
| 4 | R1 | (South Australia) The Bend Motorsport Park | Ryan MacMillan | Miles Bromley | Ryan MacMillan | Christopher Slusarski | Chris Huang | Lachlan Evennett |
| 4 | R2 | (South Australia) The Bend Motorsport Park | | Trent Grubel | Beau Russell | Christopher Slusarski | Chris Huang | Lachlan Evennett |
| 4 | R3 | (South Australia) The Bend Motorsport Park | | Miles Bromley | Ryan MacMillan | Christopher Slusarski | Chris Huang | Lachlan Evennett |
| 5 | R1 | Queensland Raceway | Miles Bromley | Ryan MacMillan | Ryan MacMillan | George Kantzios | no entries | Isaac McNeill |
| 5 | R2 | Queensland Raceway | | Ryan MacMillan | Ryan MacMillan | George Kantzios | no entries | Isaac McNeill |
| 5 | R3 | Queensland Raceway | | Ryan MacMillan | Ryan MacMillan | no classified finishers | no entries | Isaac McNeill |
| 6 | R1 | (New South Wales) Sydney Motorsport Park | Ryan MacMillan | Ryan MacMillan | Ryan MacMillan | Rodney Baker | no entries | Jayden Hamilton |
| 6 | R2 | (New South Wales) Sydney Motorsport Park | | Ryan MacMillan | Ryan MacMillan | Rodney Baker | no entries | Jayden Hamilton |
| 6 | R3 | (New South Wales) Sydney Motorsport Park | | Ryan MacMillan | Ryan MacMillan | George Kantzios | no entries | Jayden Hamilton |
| 7 | R1 | (Victoria (state)) Phillip Island Grand Prix Circuit | Ryan MacMillan | race cancelled following a medical emergency disrupting the event | | | | |
| 7 | R2 | (Victoria (state)) Phillip Island Grand Prix Circuit | | Miles Bromley | Miles Bromley | George Kantzios | Chris Huang | Isaac McNeill |
| 7 | R3 | (Victoria (state)) Phillip Island Grand Prix Circuit | | Ryan MacMillan | Ryan MacMillan | George Kantzios | no classified finishers | Lachlan Evennett |

== Season report ==
The second season of the Australian Formula Open began at Sandown Raceway, where Miles Bromley of TMR secured pole position. Bromley claimed his first single-seater victories by winning the initial two races, but an off-track excursion in the third race relegated him to seventh place. This allowed Kyle Evans of Gilmour Racing to secure the feature race victory and take a three-point lead in the AFO1 class standings. The AFO2 class featured only two entrants, with Matthew Roesler and Christopher Slusarski sharing wins in their privately run entries. Volante Rosso Racing's Isaac McNeill meanwhile dominated the AFO4 class, winning all three races of his debut circuit racing weekend.

Round two of the series at Winton Motor Raceway opened with Ryan MacMillan of TMR securing pole position before losing the lead and victory in the opening race to Bromley. In the second race, Bromley, now the championship leader, maintained his advantage, starting ahead of MacMillan and securing another win. However, the feature race saw MacMillan overtake Bromley to take victory, though Bromley retained the overall championship lead. In AFO2, Roesler was the sole entrant, allowing him to extend his points lead unopposed, while AFO3 once again did not attract any entries. Meanwhile, McNeill continued his dominant run in AFO4, further solidifying his lead in the standings.

Sydney hosted the next round, where TMR's Beau Russell secured pole position. He lost the lead to MacMillan at the start of race one and subsequently dropped two additional places due to a penalty for a start infringement. In race two, MacMillan dominated, leading from start to finish. The feature race saw Bromley reclaim the top spot, maintaining his points lead despite battling electrical issues throughout the weekend. While there were no entries in the AFO2 class, a significant milestone was achieved in AFO3 with the first-ever entry in series history, driven by Chris Huang in a TMR car. McNeill extended his winning streak in AFO4 to nine races to further solidify his points lead.

The Bend marked the midpoint of the season, where MacMillan became the first repeat pole sitter. He converted that pole into a faultless victory, followed by Bromley in second place. In the second race, MacMillan lost the lead to Russell, who took the win, while Bromley's retirement proved pivotal, allowing MacMillan to take the lead in the championship standings. The trend continued in the feature race, where MacMillan overtook Russell to secure another victory, while Bromley finished in fifth. In the other categories, all three classes featured triple winners: Slusarski prevailed in AFO2 against a four-car field, while Huang and BF Racing's Lachlan Evennett were the sole competitors in AFO3 and AFO4.

Round five of the championship took place at Queensland Raceway, and championship chaser Bromley took pole position. That would mark the only session he would finish in the lead, as MacMillan swiftly overcame Bromley's advantage in the first race, claiming victory and repeating the feat in race two to extend his points lead. In the feature race, Bromley initially took the lead, but after 15 laps of sustained pressure, MacMillan reclaimed the front position to secure another win. The competition in other classes was limited: George Kantzios of GK Racing was the only car entered in AFO2, while no cars were entered in AFO3. AFO4 saw the return of McNeill, and he took the class title after another triple win.

In round six at Sydney, points leader MacMillan capitalized on the absence of his closest rival Bromley, who missed the event due to a conflicting USF Pro 2000 test outing. MacMillan secured the title one round early with a dominant performance as he claimed pole position in qualifying, won all three races and set the fastest lap in each. Meanwhile, the AFO2 class title remained undecided, with Team Penrite's Rodney Baker winning the first two races and Kantzios securing victory in the feature race to close the gap to points leader Roesler, who endured a podium-less weekend. AFO3 had no entries, while in AFO4, TMR's Jayden Hamilton was the sole entrant, securing second place in the standings.

The season concluded with a round at Phillip Island. Championship leader MacMillan secured pole position in qualifying, but the opening day of the event was overshadowed by a medical emergency that resulted in the death of production car racing driver Andrew Rhodes-Anderson. As a result, the first race was cancelled. Returnee Bromley won race two, while MacMillan ended his title-winning season with a victory in the feature race. In the AFO2 category, Kantzios secured both race wins but was unable to prevent Roesler from clinching the class title. Huang, once again the sole AFO3 entry, only finished one race, while McNeill and Evennett emerged as the final AFO4 race winners of the year.

The second season of the championship experienced a decline in participation, with entries dropping from a minimum of 13 in the inaugural season to a maximum of 14 in 2024. The discontinuation of the S5000 Championship, previously the country's premier single-seater competition, eliminated a clear progression pathway for drivers. Simultaneously, the revival of Australia’s national Formula 4 series drew attention away from the AFO4 class by providing an FIA-sanctioned alternative. Further challenges are anticipated in 2025 with the introduction of the Formula Regional Australian Championship, which is expected to fragment driver interest even more, complicating the championship’s standing.

== Standings ==
=== Scoring system ===
Cars classified as finished in race 1 and 2 were awarded points by the following structure:

| Position | **1st** | **2nd** | **3rd** | **4th** | **5th** | **6th** | **7th** | **8th** | **9th** | **10th** | **FL** | **R1 PP** |
| Points | 12 | 9 | 8 | 7 | 6 | 5 | 4 | 3 | 2 | 1 | 1 | 1 |

The third race of the weekend, the longer Feature Race, awarded more points:

| Position | **1st** | **2nd** | **3rd** | **4th** | **5th** | **6th** | **7th** | **8th** | **9th** | **10th** | **FL** |
| Points | 20 | 15 | 12 | 10 | 8 | 6 | 4 | 3 | 2 | 1 | 1 |

=== Drivers' standings ===
| Pos | Driver | SAN (Victoria (state)) | | | WIN (Victoria (state)) | | | SYD1 (New South Wales) | | | BEN (South Australia) | | | QLD (Queensland) | | | SYD2 (New South Wales) | | | PHI (Victoria (state)) | | | Pts |
| Pos | Driver | R1 | R2 | R3 | R1 | R2 | R3 | R1 | R2 | R3 | R1 | R2 | R3 | R1 | R2 | R3 | R1 | R2 | R3 | R1 | R2 | R3 | Pts |
AFO1 standings
| 1 | Ryan MacMillan | 4 | 5 | 2 | **2** | 2 | 1 | 1 | 1 | 3 | **1** | 2 | 1 | 1 | 1 | 1 | **1** | 1 | 1 | **C** | 3 | 1 | 274 |
| 2 | Miles Bromley | **1** | 1 | 7 | 1 | 1 | 2 | 3 | 2 | 1 | 2 | Ret | 5 | **2** | 2 | 2 | | | | C | 1 | 2 | 191 |
| 3 | Kyle Evans | 6 | 2 | 1 | 5 | 3 | 3 | 2 | 3 | 4 | 4 | 4 | 3 | 3 | 3 | 3 | 3 | 3 | 2 | C | 4 | 3 | 188 |
| 4 | Beau Russell | Ret | 4 | 4 | 3 | Ret | 4 | **4** | 4 | 2 | 3 | 1 | 2 | 4 | 4 | 4 | | | | | | | 124 |
| 5 | George Kantzios | 5 | 6 | 6 | 4 | 4 | 5 | Ret | 5 | 5 | 6 | 5 | DSQ | | | | | | | | | | 70 |
| 6 | Thomas Gallagher | | | | | | | | | | | | | | | | 2 | 2 | 3 | C | 2 | 4 | 52 |
| 7 | Trent Grubel | 2 | Ret | 3 | | | | | | | 5 | 3 | 4 | | | | | | | | | | 46 |
| 8 | Nathan Beer | | | | | | | | | | | | | | | | 4 | 4 | 4 | C | DNS | 5 | 32 |
| 9 | Ryan Astley | 3 | 3 | 5 | | | | | | | | | | | | | | | | | | | 24 |
| 10 | Chris Gilmour | | | | | | | | | | | | | 5 | 5 | 5 | | | | | | | 20 |
| 11 | Trent Shirvington | | | | | | | 5 | 6 | Ret | | | | | | | | | | | | | 11 |
| — | Gerrit Ruff | WD | WD | WD | | | | | | | | | | | | | | | | | | | 0 |
AFO2 standings
| 1 | Matthew Roesler | 2 | 1 | 2 | **1** | 1 | 1 | | | | 2 | 4 | 3 | | | | 5 | 6 | 4 | **C** | 2 | 2 | 158 |
| 2 | George Kantzios | | | | | | | | | | | | | **1** | 1 | Ret | 2 | 2 | 1 | C | 1 | 1 | 101 |
| 3 | Christopher Slusarski | **1** | 2 | 1 | | | | | | | **1** | 1 | 1 | | | | | | | C | DNS | DNS | 92 |
| 4 | Matthew Woodland | WD | WD | WD | | | | | | | 4 | 3 | 4 | | | | | | | | | | 32 |
| 5 | Gerrit Ruff | | | | | | | | | | 3 | 2 | 2 | | | | | | | | | | 28 |
| 6 | Rodney Baker | | | | | | | | | | | | | | | | **1** | 1 | Ret | | | | 27 |
| 7 | Lawrence Katsidis | | | | | | | | | | | | | | | | Ret | 5 | 2 | | | | 21 |
| =8 | Ron Bennet | | | | | | | | | | | | | | | | Ret | 3 | 3 | | | | 20 |
| =8 | Paul DiBiase | | | | | | | | | | WD | WD | WD | | | | | | | C | 3 | 3 | 20 |
| 10 | Rodney Brincat | | | | | | | | | | | | | | | | 4 | 4 | DNS | | | | 14 |
| 11 | Graeme Holmes | | | | | | | | | | | | | | | | 3 | Ret | DNS | | | | 8 |
| — | Shayne Morrow | | | | | | | | | | | | | | | | Ret | DNS | DNS | | | | 0 |
AFO3 standings
| 1 | Chris Huang | | | | | | | **1** | Ret | 1 | **1** | 1 | 1 | | | | | | | **C** | 1 | Ret | 99 |
AFO4 standings
| 1 | Isaac McNeill | **1** | 1 | 1 | **1** | 1 | 1 | **1** | 1 | 1 | | | | **1** | 1 | 1 | | | | C | 1 | 2 | 220 |
| 2 | Jayden Hamilton | 3 | 3 | 3 | 2 | 2 | 2 | WD | WD | WD | | | | 2 | 2 | Ret | **1** | 1 | 1 | C | 3 | Ret | 135 |
| 3 | Lachlan Evennett | | | | | | | | | | **1** | 1 | 1 | | | | | | | C | 2 | 1 | 78 |
| =4 | Joanne Ciconte | 2 | 2 | 2 | | | | | | | | | | | | | | | | | | | 33 |
| =4 | Tim Bodyle | | | | | | | 2 | 2 | 2 | | | | | | | | | | | | | 33 |
| 6 | Ryan Sorensen | | | | | | | | | | | | | 3 | 3 | 2 | | | | | | | 31 |
| 7 | Hunter Salvatore | | | | | | | | | | | | | | | | | | | **C** | DNS | DNS | 1 |
| Pos | Driver | R1 | R2 | R3 | R1 | R2 | R3 | R1 | R2 | R3 | R1 | R2 | R3 | R1 | R2 | R3 | R1 | R2 | R3 | R1 | R2 | R3 | Pts |
| Pos | Driver | SAN (Victoria (state)) | | | WIN (Victoria (state)) | | | SYD1 (New South Wales) | | | BEN (South Australia) | | | QLD (Queensland) | | | SYD2 (New South Wales) | | | PHI (Victoria (state)) | | | Pts |

| Colour | Result |
|---|---|
| Gold | Winner |
| Silver | Second place |
| Bronze | Third place |
| Green | Points classification |
| Blue | Non-points classification |
| Blue | Non-classified finish (NC) |
| Purple | Retired, not classified (Ret) |
| Red | Did not qualify (DNQ) |
| Red | Did not pre-qualify (DNPQ) |
| Black | Disqualified (DSQ) |
| White | Did not start (DNS) |
| White | Withdrew (WD) |
| White | Race cancelled (C) |
| Blank | Did not practice (DNP) |
| Blank | Did not arrive (DNA) |
| Blank | Excluded (EX) |

**Bold** – Pole

Italics – Fastest Lap
