= Rio Shimono =

Japanese racing driver (born 2000)

- Nationality: Japan
- Born: May 25, 2000 (age 26) Osaka Prefecture, Japan

Championship titles
- 2020: TCR Japan Saturday Series Bronze

Rio Shimono (下野 璃央, Shimono Rio; born May 25, 2000) is a Japanese racing driver. She won the TCR Japan Saturday Series in the Bronze category in 2020, racing for Drago Corse and was also the first female driver in the series.

== Racing record ==
=== Career summary ===
Season	Series	Team	Races	Wins	Poles	F/Laps	Podiums	Points	Position
2019	Super-FJ Suzuka Series	Drago Corse	6	0	0	0	0	6	11th
2019	Super-FJ Autopolis Series	Drago Corse	3	1	0	0	1	30	5th
2020	TCR Japan Touring Car Series - Saturday Series	Drago Corse	5	1	1	0	2	81	**2nd**
2020	TCR Japan Touring Car Series - Sunday Series	Drago Corse	4	0	2	0	2	55	4th
2020	Super-FJ Suzuka Series	Drago Corse	3	0	0	0	2	34	**2nd**
2021	Kyojo Cup	Drago Corse	4	0	2	1	2	55	**3rd**
2022	F4 Japanese Championship	Zap Speed	14	0	0	0	0	0	31st
2022	Kyojo Cup	Fujita Pharmacy Racing	3	0	0	0	1	39	4th
2023	F4 Japanese Championship	Zap Speed	8	0	0	0	0	6	19th
2023	F4 Japanese Championship	Dr.Dry	6	0	0	0	0	6	19th
2024	F4 Japanese Championship	Dr.Dry	14	0	0	0	0	3	18th
2024	Kyojo Cup	Dr.Dry	6	0	3	1	5	75	**3rd**
2025	Kyojo Cup	Itochu Enex Wecars Team Impul with Dr.Dry	10	8	3	4	10	149	**1st**
2025	F110 Cup	Dr.Dry Racing Team	2	0	0	0	1	26	11th
2025	F4 Japanese Championship	Dr.Dry	9	0	0	0	0	0	28th
2025-26	24H Series Middle East - TCX	Toyota Gazoo Rookie Racing	1	0	0	0	0	0	NC
2026	Formula Regional Japanese Championship	Dr.Dry Racing Team	14	1	2	1	1	120	4th
2026	Kyojo Cup	Dr.Dry Racing with Impul	10	1	0	0	2	53	6th
2026	TGR GR86/BRZ Cup	KTMS	1	0	0	0	0	0	NC

=== Complete F4 Japanese Championship results ===
(key) (Races in bold indicate pole position) (Races in italics indicate fastest lap)

Year	Team	1	2	3	4	5	6	7	8	9	10	11	12	13	14	DC	Pts	Ref
2022	Zap Speed	FUJ1; 1; 34	FUJ1; 2; 16	SUZ; 1; 22	SUZ; 2; 34	FUJ2; 1; 21	FUJ2; 2; 20	SUZ2; 1; 33	SUZ2; 2; 18	SUG; 1; 23	SUG; 2; 24	AUT; 1; 18	AUT; 2; 19	MOT; 1; 21	MOT; 2 Ret	31st	0	
2023	Zap Speed	FUJ1; 1; 7	FUJ1; 2; 18	SUZ; 1; 19	SUZ; 2; 20	FUJ2; 1; 19	FUJ2; 2; 24	SUZ2; 1; 19	SUZ2; 2; 19							19th	6	
2023	Dr. Dry									SUG; 1; 16	SUG; 2; 17	AUT; 1; 17	AUT; 2; 16	MOT; 1; 17	MOT; 2; 15	19th	6	
2024	Dr. Dry	FUJ1; 1 Ret	FUJ1; 2; 11	SUZ; 1; 15	SUZ; 2; 19	FUJ2; 1; 13	FUJ2; 2 Ret	SUG; 1; 12	SUG; 2; 11	AUT; 1; 13	MOT; 1; 11	MOT; 2; 9	MOT; 3; 13	SUZ2; 1; 10	SUZ2; 2; 11	18th	3	
2025	Dr Dry Racing Team	FUJ1; 1; 17	FUJ1; 2 DNS	FUJ1; 3; 16	FUJ2; 1 DNS	FUJ2; 2; 24	SUZ; 1; 21	SUZ; 2; 21	SUG; 1	SUG; 2	SUG; 3	AUT; 1; 15	AUT; 2; 27	MOT; 1; 24	MOT; 2; 24	28th	0	

=== Complete Formula Regional Japanese Championship results ===
(key) (Races in bold indicate pole position) (Races in italics indicate fastest lap)

Year	Team	1	2	3	4	5	6	7	8	9	10	11	12	13	14	DC	Pts	Ref
2026	Dr. Dry Racing Team	SUZ1; 1; 8	SUZ1; 2; 8	SUZ1; 3; 7	SUZ2; 1; 7	SUZ2; 2 Ret	MOT; 1; 4	MOT; 2; 5	**SUG**; **1**; 1	SUG; 2; 5	**SUG**; **3**; 4	FUJ1; 1; 6	FUJ1; 2; 6	FUJ2; 1; 4	FUJ2; 2; 6	4th	120	
