= Miki Onaga =

Japanese racing driver (born 1997)

- Nationality: (Japan) Japanese
- Born: 4 November 1997 (age 29) Okinawa Prefecture, Japan

Kyojo Cup career
- Debut season: 2019
- Current team: Nat Team KCMG
- Car number: 7
- Former teams: RSS; Fujita Pharmacy Racing
- Starts: 45
- Wins: 14
- Podiums: 31
- Poles: 5
- Fastest laps: 14
- Best finish: 1st in 2022

Championship titles
- 2022: Kyojo Cup

Awards
- 2018: TGR Woman Award

Miki Onaga (翁長 実希, Onaga Miki; born 4 November 1997 in Okinawa Prefecture) is a Japanese racing driver who last competed for Nat Team KCMG in Kyojo Cup, which she won in 2022 for Fujita Pharmacy Racing.

== Career ==
=== Karting ===
After competing in local karting championships, Onaga joined Scuderia Okinawa alongside Hibiki Taira to compete in the FS-125 class of the 2017 All-Japan Karting Championship. In 2023, Onaga won the All-Japan EV Karting Championship.

=== Car racing ===
==== Kyojo Cup debut and early success (2019–2021) ====
After winning the Kart race and finishing third overall in the TGR-sponsored Dual Attack event, Onaga was given the TGR Woman Award and a drive in both the 2019 Toyota Gazoo Racing GR86/BRZ Cup and the Netz Cup Vitz Race. Following her appearance in the Vita of Asia race, Onaga made her debut in Kyojo Cup, entering the second round of that year's season. On her debut, Onaga started second and overtook Hinako Muramatsu in the closing stages of the race to take her maiden win in the series by less than three tenths. Despite finishing runner-up in the final two races of the season, Onaga lost out on the title by one point after Muramatsu won the final race and the title.

In 2020, Onaga returned to Kyojo Cup. In the opening race of the season, she passed Ai Miura on the opening lap and won the red-flagged race by over seven seconds. Despite ending the season with a win in the finale, she lost out on the title to Miura by thirteen points. Returning to Kyojo Cup for her third season, Onaga joined Fujita Pharmacy Racing after spending two years as a privateer. After a slow start to the season, Onaga won the final two races of the season and finished second in the standings to Shion Tsujimoto.

==== Maiden Kyojo Cup title and first races abroad (2022–present) ====
Onaga stayed with Fujita Pharmacy Racing in 2022. She won the first three races of the season and clinched her maiden Kyojo Cup title with a race to spare. In 2023, Onaga joined RSS in Kyojo Cup. Following a third place in the opening round and finishing second to Ai Miura by 78 milliseconds in round two, Onaga won the final two races of the season but ended the season runner-up to Miura in the points.

In early 2024, RSS announced that Onaga would remain with them for a double program in Kyojo Cup and TGR GR86/BRZ Cup. She won two races in Kyojo Cup and led the standings ahead of the final round, but following a lock-up which sent her to the back of the field on the opening lap, Onaga wasn't able to score points and ended the season runner-up in points to Aimi Saito. During 2024, Onaga raced in two rounds of the Toyota GR Cup North America, scoring a best result of 19th at Barber Motorsports Park.

On 25 December 2024, it was announced that Onaga would join Toyota-supported Kids com Team KCMG ahead of her seventh season in Kyojo Cup. In early 2025, OTG Motor Sports announced Onaga as a driver for them in Japanese F4 and in the TGR GR86/BRZ Cup. In Kyojo Cup, Onaga scored a lone win in the second Kyojo Final of the year and scored six more podiums to end the year runner-up in points, while in Japanese F4, Onaga scored a best result of 13th in the season-opening race at Fuji.

The following year, Onaga returned to Nat Team KCMG to continue in Kyojo Cup. In her second season with KCMG, Onaga took a lone win in round four's sprint and scored four additional podiums to end the season fourth overall. In parallel, Onaga returned to OTG Motor Sports for to race in the F4 Japanese Championship and the TGR GR86/BRZ Cup. Between the two campaigns, Onaga found more success in F4, where she was 21st in the overall standings with a best result of seventh at Fuji.

== Personal life ==
Onaga is the daughter of Tatsuya Onaga, who opened the Kukuru Yomitan Circuit in 2002, ran Scuderia Okinawa and most recently opened Motorsports Multi-Field Okinawa in 2021.

== Karting record ==
=== Karting career summary ===
Season	Series	Team	Position
2017	Regional Kart Championship West Region – FS-125	Scuderia Okinawa	7th
2017	All-Japan Regional Kart Championship Western Region – FS-125 Class	Scuderia Okinawa	6th
2023	All-Japan Karting Championship – EV	RSS with TOM'S-EV Racing	1st

== Racing record ==
=== Racing career summary ===
Season	Series	Team	Races	Wins	Poles	F/Laps	Podiums	Points	Position
2019	Netz Cup Vita Race – CVT	DualAttack	1	0	0	0	1	N/A	**2nd**
2019	Vita of Asia	Exgel Motorsport	2	0	0	0	0	—N/a	/
2019	Kyojo Cup	Miki Onaga	3	1	0	1	3	61	**2nd**
2019	FCR-VITA	Miki Onaga	1	0	0	0	0	8	13th
2020	Kyojo Cup	Miki Onaga	4	2	0	1	3	67	**2nd**
2020	FCR-VITA	Miki Onaga	2	0	0	0	0	16	7th
2020	Super Taikyu – ST-4	Kobe Toyopet Motor Sports	3	0	0	0	1	44.5‡	5th‡
2020	JAF Formula 4	Fujita Pharmacy Racing	1	0	0	0	0	2	23rd
2020	JAF Formula 4 – Grand Champion S Class	Fujita Pharmacy Racing	2	0	0	0	0	26	17th
2021	Kyojo Cup	Fujita Pharmacy Racing	4	2	0	1	2	57.5	**2nd**
2021	FCR-VITA	Fujita Pharmacy Racing	2	1	1	0	1	30	5th
2021	JAF Formula 4	Fujita Pharmacy Racing	9	0	0	0	0	35	7th
2021	JAF Formula 4 – Grand Champion S Class	Fujita Pharmacy Racing	9	0	0	0	0	108	8th
2021	Super Taikyu – ST-2	Kobe Toyopet Motor Sports	6	4	0	1	4	100‡	**3rd‡**
2022	Kyojo Cup	Fujita Pharmacy Racing	4	3	4	4	3	73.5	**1st**
2022	FCR-VITA	Fujita Pharmacy Racing	4	0	0	0	3	52	**2nd**
2022	TGR GR86/BRZ Cup	KIM International	6	0	0	0	0	0	NC
2022	All-Japan EV-GP Series – General	Team Taisan	1	0	0	0	0	10	NC
2022	All-Japan EV-GP Series – EV-1	Team Taisan	1	0	0	0	0	10	NC
2023	Kyojo Cup	RSS	4	2	0	2	4	80	**2nd**
2023	FCR-VITA	RSS	4	0	0	0	3	41	**2nd**
2023	TGR GR86/BRZ Cup	RSS	5	0	0	0	0	0	NC
2024	Kyojo Cup	RSS	6	2	0	1	4	77	**2nd**
2024	FCR-VITA	RSS	3	0	0	0	1	25	4th
2024	TGR GR86/BRZ Cup	RSS	6	0	0	0	0	0	NC
2024	Toyota GR Cup North America	Hattori Motorsports	4	0	0	0	0	0	N/A
2025	Kyojo Cup	Kids com Team KCMG	10	1	0	4	7	98	**2nd**
2025	F4 Japanese Championship	OTG Motor Sports	14	0	0	0	0	0	26th
2025	TGR GR86/BRZ Cup	OTG Motor Sports	7	0	0	0	0	0	NC
2025–26	24H Series Middle East – TCX	Toyota Gazoo Rookie Racing	1	0	0	0	1	36	NC
2026	Kyojo Cup	Nat Team KCMG	10	1	1	2	5	77	4th
2026	F4 Japanese Championship	OTG Motor Sports	14	0	0	0	0	6	21st
2026	TGR GR86/BRZ Cup	OTG Motor Sports						*	*

‡ Team standings

=== Complete Kyojo Cup results ===
(key) (Races in bold indicate pole position) (Races in italics indicate fastest lap)

Year	Entrant	1	2	3	4	5	6	7	8	9	10	Pos	Points
2019	Privateer	FUJ1	FUJ2; 1	FUJ3; 2	FUJ4; 2							2nd	61
2020	Privateer	FUJ1; 1	SUZ; 2	FUJ2; DSQ	FUJ3; 1							2nd	67
2021	Fujita Pharmacy Racing	FUJ1; 6	SUZ; Ret	FUJ2; 1	FUJ3; 1							2nd	57.5
2022	Fujita Pharmacy Racing	**FUJ1**; 1	**FUJ2**; 1	**FUJ3**; 1	**FUJ4**; 11							1st	73.5
2023	RSS	FUJ1; 3	FUJ2; 2	FUJ3; 1	FUJ4; 1							2nd	80
2024	RSS	FUJ1; 1	FUJ2; 1; 3	FUJ2; 2; 5	FUJ3; 2	FUJ4; 1	**NC**; **1**; 3	**NC**; **2**; 3	FUJ5; 15			2nd	77
2025	Kids com Team KCMG	FUJ1; SPR; 2	FUJ1; FIN; 2	FUJ2; SPR; 2	FUJ2; FIN; 1	FUJ3; SPR; 16	FUJ3; FIN; 6	FUJ4; SPR; 2^{3}	FUJ4; FIN; 4	FUJ5; SPR; 2^{3}	FUJ5; FIN; 2	2nd	98
2026	Nat Team KCMG	FUJ1; SPR; 4	FUJ1; FIN; 4	FUJ2; SPR; 4^{2}	FUJ2; FIN; 2	FUJ3; SPR; 12	FUJ3; FIN; 19	**FUJ4**; **SPR**; 1^{1}	FUJ4; FIN; 3	FUJ5; SPR; 3^{3}	FUJ5; FIN; 3	4th	77

=== Complete F4 Japanese Championship results ===
(key) (Races in bold indicate pole position) (Races in italics indicate fastest lap)

Year	Team	1	2	3	4	5	6	7	8	9	10	11	12	13	14	DC	Pts
2025	OTG Motor Sports	FUJ1; 1; 13	FUJ1; 2 Ret	FUJ1; 3; 20	FUJ2; 1; 18	FUJ2; 2; 20	SUZ; 1; 22	SUZ; 2; 24	SUG; 1; 20	SUG; 2; 23	SUG; 3 Ret	AUT; 1; 21	AUT; 2; 19	MOT; 1; 22	MOT; 2; 23	26th	0
2026	OTG Motor Sports	FUJ1; 1; 15	FUJ1; 2; 7	OKA; 1; 24	OKA; 2; 27	FUJ2; 1; 20	FUJ2; 2; 23	SUZ; 1; 29	SUZ; 2; 23	SUG; 1 Ret	SUG; 2; 17	AUT; 1; 15	AUT; 2; 14	MOT; 1; 19	MOT; 2; 16	21st	6
