= Kyojo Cup =

Female-only Japanese single-seater racing championship

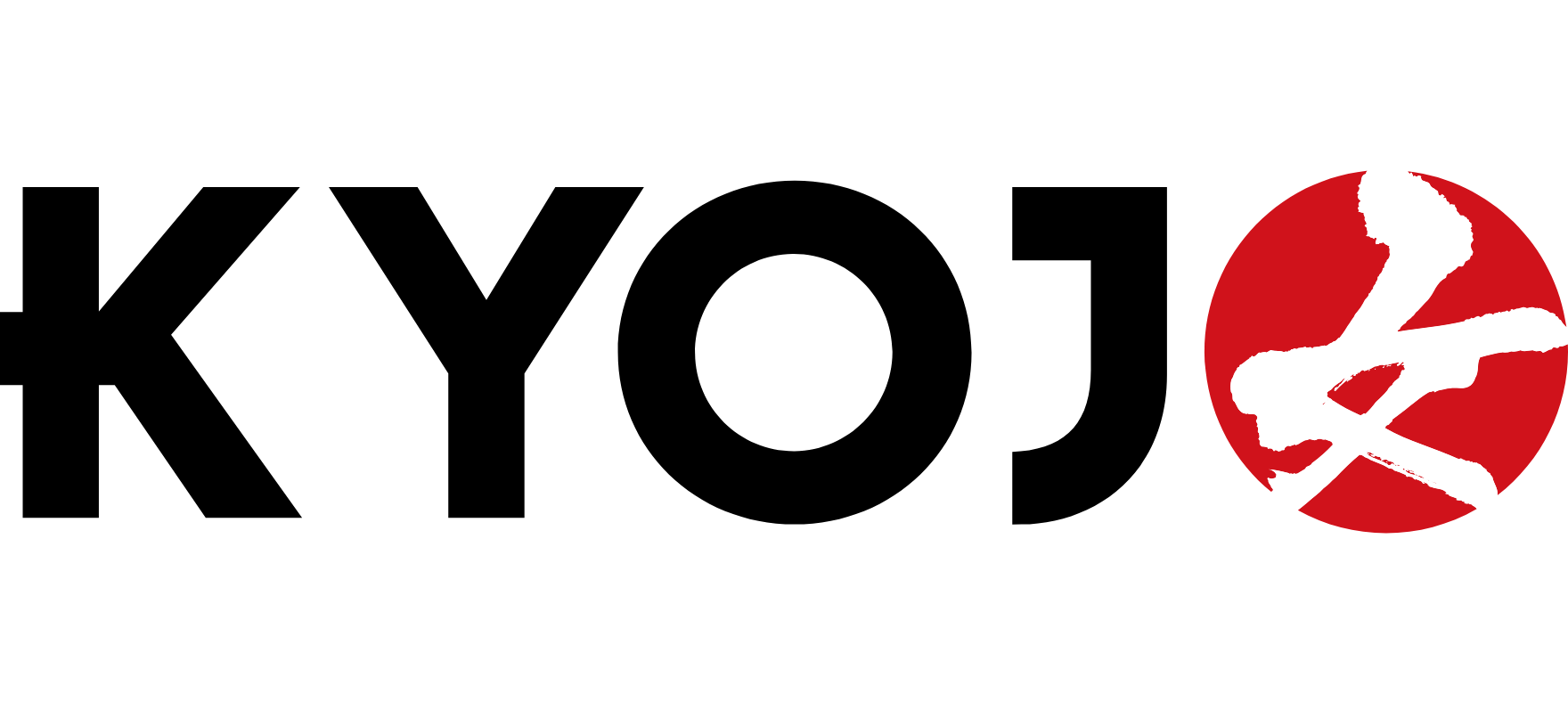
- Category: Formula 4
- Country: Japan
- Inaugural season: 2017
- Chassis suppliers: KCMG
- Engine suppliers: Abarth
- Tyre suppliers: Bridgestone
- Drivers' champion: (Japan) Rio Shimono
- Official website: https://kyojocup.jp

The Kyojo Cup is an all-female formula racing championship held in Japan founded in 2017 by Masanori Sekiya as a support championship for the Inter Proto Series.

Having run to the same specifications as the FCR Vita championship since 2017, the series switched to the KC-MG01 ahead of the 2025 season.

== Event format ==
In the first eight seasons of the championship, the race weekends consisted of one qualifying session and one race, held on the same day.

From 2025 onwards, the series switched to a two-race format consisting of a "Sprint" race, held on Saturday, and a "Final" race, held on Sunday.

== The car ==
=== 2017–2024 ===
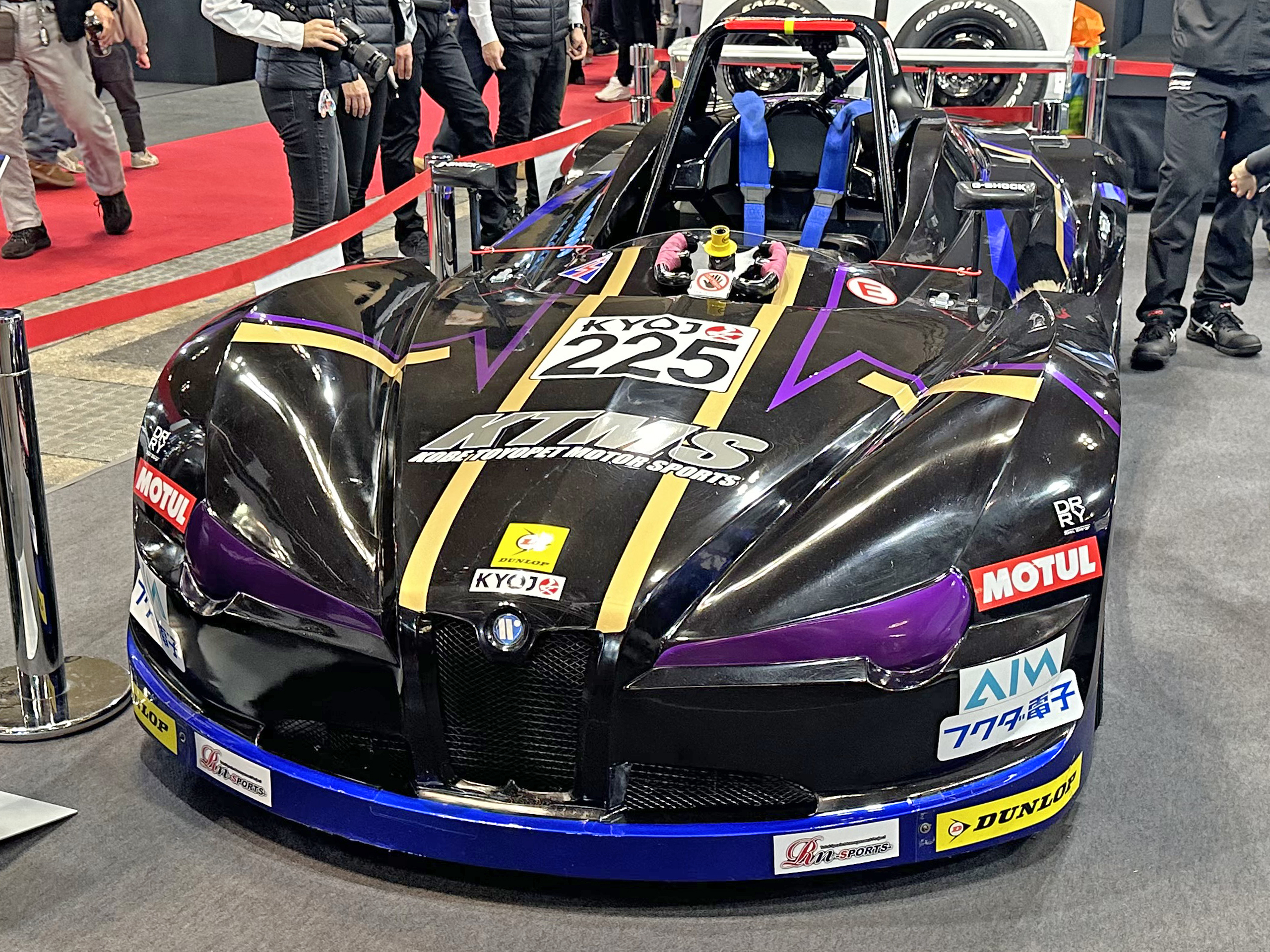
Riona Tomishita's 2023 VITA-01 at the 2024 Osaka Auto Messe

The championship's first car was the Vita-01, designed and built by West Racing Cars.

==== Specifications ====
- Engine displacement: Vitz RS 1.5 L (92 cu in)
- Gearbox: Vitz RS 5-speed manual gearbox
- Weight: 600 kg (1,323 lb)
- Power output: 110 hp (82 kW)
- Aspiration: Naturally-aspirated
- Length: 3,712 mm (146 in)
- Width: 1,600 mm (63 in)
- Wheelbase: 2,200 mm (87 in)
- Tyres: Dunlop

=== 2025 ===
Starting from the 2025 season, Kyojo Cup will use the KC-MG01 F4 car, previously used in the 2019 and 2022 editions of FIA Motorsport Games' Formula 4 Cup.

==== Specifications ====
- Engine displacement: 1.4 L (85 cu in)
- Gearbox: 6-speed paddle shift sequential semi-automatic gearbox
- Weight: 635 kg (1,400 lb)
- Power output: 176 hp (131 kW) + 12KW from ERS
- Aspiration: Single-turbocharged
- Length: 4,150 mm (163 in)
- Width: 1,506 mm (59 in)
- Wheelbase: 2,753 mm (108 in)
- Tyres: Bridgestone

== Champions ==
=== Drivers ===
Season	Driver	Team	Poles	Wins	Podiums	Fastest laps	Points	Clinched	Margin	Ref(s)
2017	(Japan) Miki Koyama	(Japan) J-Gear	1	2	2	2	40	Race 2 of 2	15	
2018	(Japan) Miki Koyama	(Japan) Miki Koyama	4	3	3	4	75	Race 4 of 4	21	
2019	(Japan) Hinako Muramatsu	(Japan) Hinako Muramatsu	2	1	3	2	62	Race 4 of 4	1	
2020	(Japan) Ai Miura	(Japan) ALBA	3	1	4	1	86	Race 4 of 4	13	
2021	(Japan) Shion Tsujimoto	(Japan) Wildcat Competition	2	2	4	1	80	Race 4 of 4	22.5	
2022	(Japan) Miki Onaga	(Japan) Fujita Pharmacy Racing	4	3	3	4	73.5	Race 4 of 4	3.5	
2023	(Japan) Ai Miura	(Japan) Team M	2	2	4	1	86	Race 4 of 4	6	
2024	(Japan) Aimi Saito	(Japan) Team M	3	4	5	2	115.5	Race 6 of 6	38.5	
2025	(Japan) Rio Shimono	(Japan) Itochu Enex Wecars Team Impul with Dr.Dry	3	8	10	4	149	Race 8 of 10	51	

== Circuits ==
- **Bold** denotes a circuit will be used in the 2025 season.

Number	Circuits	Rounds	Years
1	(Shizuoka Prefecture) **Fuji Speedway**	32 (Note: Fuji Speedway hosted all but two rounds since 2017.)	2017–present
2	(Mie Prefecture) Suzuka Circuit	2	2020–2021
