= 2025–26 24H Series Middle East =

Motor racing competition

The 2025–26 24H Series Middle East was the fourth season of the 24H Series Middle East, presented by Creventic. The races were contested with GT3-spec cars, GT4-spec cars, sports cars, 24H-Specials, like silhouette cars, TCR Touring Cars, TCX cars and TC cars.

The season began at Sepang International Circuit in Malaysia on 6 December 2025 and finished at the Dubai 24 Hour on 18 January 2026.

== Calendar ==
| Round | Event | Circuit | Location | Date | Map of circuit locations |
|---|---|---|---|---|---|
| 1 | Michelin 12 Hours of Sepang | (Malaysia) Sepang International Circuit | Sepang, Selangor, Malaysia | 5–6 December 2025 | 2025–26 24H Series Middle East is located in Asia |
| 2 | Michelin 6 Hours of Abu Dhabi | (United Arab Emirates) Yas Marina Circuit | Abu Dhabi, United Arab Emirates | 9–10 January 2026 | 2025–26 24H Series Middle East is located in Asia |
| 3 | Michelin Dubai 24 Hour | (United Arab Emirates) Dubai Autodrome | Dubai, United Arab Emirates | 16–17 January 2026 | 2025–26 24H Series Middle East is located in Asia |

== Teams and drivers ==
| Team | Car | Engine | No. | Drivers | Class | Rounds |
GT3
| (Antigua and Barbuda) HAAS RT | Audi R8 LMS Evo II | Audi DAR 5.2 L V10 | 2 | (Saint Kitts and Nevis) Alexander Bukhantsov (Note: All following drivers are Russian, but Bukhantsov and Feyzulin competes under a Kittitian licence, Geshev under a Montenegrin license, Minsky, Solukovtsev and Stanchin under a Kyrgyz license, Novichkov under a Vanuatuan license, Nesov under a Slovene license, Stolyarov, Salikhov and Ekelchik under an American licenses. Lomko under a Grenadian license and Sorokin under a Portuguese license as Russian national emblems were banned by the FIA following the Russian invasion of Ukraine.) | Am | 2–3 |
| (Antigua and Barbuda) HAAS RT | Audi R8 LMS Evo II | Audi DAR 5.2 L V10 | 2 | (Poland) Damian Ciosek | Am | 2–3 |
| (Antigua and Barbuda) HAAS RT | Audi R8 LMS Evo II | Audi DAR 5.2 L V10 | 2 | (United Kingdom) James Winslow | Am | 2–3 |
| (Antigua and Barbuda) HAAS RT | Audi R8 LMS Evo II | Audi DAR 5.2 L V10 | 2 | (Montenegro) Alim Geshev | Am | 3 |
| (Antigua and Barbuda) HAAS RT | Audi R8 LMS Evo II | Audi DAR 5.2 L V10 | 2 | (United Kingdom) George King | Am | 3 |
| (Antigua and Barbuda) HAAS RT | Audi R8 LMS Evo II | Audi DAR 5.2 L V10 | 21 | (Belgium) Nicolas Guelinckx | Am | 2–3 |
| (Antigua and Barbuda) HAAS RT | Audi R8 LMS Evo II | Audi DAR 5.2 L V10 | 21 | (Belgium) Peter Guelinckx | Am | 2–3 |
| (Antigua and Barbuda) HAAS RT | Audi R8 LMS Evo II | Audi DAR 5.2 L V10 | 21 | (Saint Kitts and Nevis) Amir Feyzulin | Am | 2 |
| (Antigua and Barbuda) HAAS RT | Audi R8 LMS Evo II | Audi DAR 5.2 L V10 | 21 | (Belgium) Fabian Duffieux | Am | 3 |
| (Antigua and Barbuda) HAAS RT | Audi R8 LMS Evo II | Audi DAR 5.2 L V10 | 21 | (Belgium) Matisse Lismont | Am | 3 |
| (Australia) Grove Racing by GetSpeed | Mercedes-AMG GT3 Evo | Mercedes-AMG M159 6.2 L V8 | 4 | (Australia) Kai Allen | P | 3 |
| (Australia) Grove Racing by GetSpeed | Mercedes-AMG GT3 Evo | Mercedes-AMG M159 6.2 L V8 | 4 | (Andorra) Jules Gounon | P | 3 |
| (Australia) Grove Racing by GetSpeed | Mercedes-AMG GT3 Evo | Mercedes-AMG M159 6.2 L V8 | 4 | (Australia) Brenton Grove | P | 3 |
| (Australia) Grove Racing by GetSpeed | Mercedes-AMG GT3 Evo | Mercedes-AMG M159 6.2 L V8 | 4 | (Australia) Stephen Grove | P | 3 |
| (Australia) Grove Racing by GetSpeed | Mercedes-AMG GT3 Evo | Mercedes-AMG M159 6.2 L V8 | 4 | (United Kingdom) Chris Lulham | P | 3 |
| (Germany) Car Collection Motorsport | Porsche 911 GT3 R (992) | Porsche M97/80 4.2 L Flat-6 | 7 | Aleksei Denisov (Note: All 21 drivers are Russian, but they compete as neutral competitors as Russian national emblems were banned by the FIA following the Russian invasion of Ukraine.) | Am | 2 |
| (Germany) Car Collection Motorsport | Porsche 911 GT3 R (992) | Porsche M97/80 4.2 L Flat-6 | 7 | Victor Plekhanov | Am | 2 |
| (Germany) Car Collection Motorsport | Porsche 911 GT3 R (992) | Porsche M97/80 4.2 L Flat-6 | 7 | Damir Saitov | Am | 2 |
| (New Zealand) EBM | Mercedes-AMG GT3 Evo | Mercedes-AMG M159 6.2 L V8 | 8 | (China) Zhou Bihuang | Am 2 PA 3 | 2–3 |
| (New Zealand) EBM | Mercedes-AMG GT3 Evo | Mercedes-AMG M159 6.2 L V8 | 8 | (Indonesia) Johanes Setiawan Santoso | Am 2 PA 3 | 2–3 |
| (New Zealand) EBM | Mercedes-AMG GT3 Evo | Mercedes-AMG M159 6.2 L V8 | 8 | (United Arab Emirates) Jamie Day | Am 2 PA 3 | 2 |
| (New Zealand) EBM | Mercedes-AMG GT3 Evo | Mercedes-AMG M159 6.2 L V8 | 8 | (China) Kerong Li | Am 2 PA 3 | 3 |
| (New Zealand) EBM | Mercedes-AMG GT3 Evo | Mercedes-AMG M159 6.2 L V8 | 8 | (Finland) Elias Seppänen | Am 2 PA 3 | 3 |
| (New Zealand) EBM | Mercedes-AMG GT3 Evo | Mercedes-AMG M159 6.2 L V8 | 8 | (Thailand) Tanart Sathienthirakul | Am 2 PA 3 | 3 |
| (New Zealand) EBM | Porsche 911 GT3 R (992) | Porsche M97/80 4.2 L Flat-6 | 61 | (Malaysia) Adrian D'Silva | P | 2–3 |
| (New Zealand) EBM | Porsche 911 GT3 R (992) | Porsche M97/80 4.2 L Flat-6 | 61 | (Italy) Enzo Trulli | P | 2–3 |
| (New Zealand) EBM | Porsche 911 GT3 R (992) | Porsche M97/80 4.2 L Flat-6 | 61 | (United Kingdom) Harry King | P | 2 |
| (New Zealand) EBM | Porsche 911 GT3 R (992) | Porsche M97/80 4.2 L Flat-6 | 61 | (France) Dorian Boccolacci | P | 3 |
| (New Zealand) EBM | Porsche 911 GT3 R (992) | Porsche M97/80 4.2 L Flat-6 | 61 | (France) Alessandro Ghiretti | P | 3 |
| (Hong Kong) Absolute Racing | Porsche 911 GT3 R (992) | Porsche M97/80 4.2 L Flat-6 | 10 | (Hong Kong) Antares Au | P | 1 |
| (Hong Kong) Absolute Racing | Porsche 911 GT3 R (992) | Porsche M97/80 4.2 L Flat-6 | 10 | (Netherlands) Loek Hartog | P | 1 |
| (Hong Kong) Absolute Racing | Porsche 911 GT3 R (992) | Porsche M97/80 4.2 L Flat-6 | 10 | (Switzerland) Patric Niederhauser | P | 1 |
| (Thailand) Winhere B-Quik Absolute Racing | Porsche 911 GT3 R (992) | Porsche M97/80 4.2 L Flat-6 | 26 | (China) Deng Yi | PA | 1 |
| (Thailand) Winhere B-Quik Absolute Racing | Porsche 911 GT3 R (992) | Porsche M97/80 4.2 L Flat-6 | 26 | (France) Alessandro Ghiretti | PA | 1 |
| (Thailand) Winhere B-Quik Absolute Racing | Porsche 911 GT3 R (992) | Porsche M97/80 4.2 L Flat-6 | 26 | (Netherlands) Henk Kiks | PA | 1 |
| (Thailand) Winhere B-Quik Absolute Racing | Porsche 911 GT3 R (992) | Porsche M97/80 4.2 L Flat-6 | 26 | (Philippines) "Vincenzo Ricci" | PA | 1 |
| (Germany) Herberth Motorsport | Porsche 911 GT3 R (992) | Porsche M97/80 4.2 L Flat-6 | 10 | (Hong Kong) Antares Au | P | 2–3 |
| (Germany) Herberth Motorsport | Porsche 911 GT3 R (992) | Porsche M97/80 4.2 L Flat-6 | 10 | (Netherlands) Loek Hartog | P | 2–3 |
| (Germany) Herberth Motorsport | Porsche 911 GT3 R (992) | Porsche M97/80 4.2 L Flat-6 | 10 | (Netherlands) Huub van Eijndhoven | P | 2 |
| (Germany) Herberth Motorsport | Porsche 911 GT3 R (992) | Porsche M97/80 4.2 L Flat-6 | 10 | (Germany) Ralf Bohn | P | 3 |
| (Germany) Herberth Motorsport | Porsche 911 GT3 R (992) | Porsche M97/80 4.2 L Flat-6 | 10 | (Germany) Joel Sturm | P | 3 |
| (Germany) Herberth Motorsport | Porsche 911 GT3 R (992) | Porsche M97/80 4.2 L Flat-6 | 91 | (Germany) Ralf Bohn | PA | 1–2 |
| (Germany) Herberth Motorsport | Porsche 911 GT3 R (992) | Porsche M97/80 4.2 L Flat-6 | 91 | (Germany) Alfred Renauer | PA | 1–2 |
| (Germany) Herberth Motorsport | Porsche 911 GT3 R (992) | Porsche M97/80 4.2 L Flat-6 | 91 | (Germany) Robert Renauer | PA | 1–2 |
| (Germany) Herberth Motorsport | Porsche 911 GT3 R (992) | Porsche M97/80 4.2 L Flat-6 | 91 | (Germany) Constantin Dressler | PA | 1 |
| (Germany) Herberth Motorsport | Porsche 911 GT3 R (992) | Porsche M97/80 4.2 L Flat-6 | 269 | (Germany) Vincent Kolb | PA | 2–3 |
| (Germany) Herberth Motorsport | Porsche 911 GT3 R (992) | Porsche M97/80 4.2 L Flat-6 | 269 | (Germany) Max Moritz | PA | 2–3 |
| (Germany) Herberth Motorsport | Porsche 911 GT3 R (992) | Porsche M97/80 4.2 L Flat-6 | 269 | (Germany) Sven Müller | PA | 2–3 |
| (Germany) Herberth Motorsport | Porsche 911 GT3 R (992) | Porsche M97/80 4.2 L Flat-6 | 269 | (Germany) Alfred Renauer | PA | 3 |
| (Germany) Herberth Motorsport | Porsche 911 GT3 R (992) | Porsche M97/80 4.2 L Flat-6 | 269 | (Germany) Florian Spengler | PA | 3 |
| (Switzerland) Hofor Racing | Mercedes-AMG GT3 Evo | Mercedes-AMG M159 6.2 L V8 | 11 | (Germany) Torsten Kratz | Am | 2–3 |
| (Switzerland) Hofor Racing | Mercedes-AMG GT3 Evo | Mercedes-AMG M159 6.2 L V8 | 11 | (Germany) Alexander Prinz | Am | 2–3 |
| (Switzerland) Hofor Racing | Mercedes-AMG GT3 Evo | Mercedes-AMG M159 6.2 L V8 | 11 | (Switzerland) Chantal Prinz | Am | 2–3 |
| (Switzerland) Hofor Racing | Mercedes-AMG GT3 Evo | Mercedes-AMG M159 6.2 L V8 | 11 | (Germany) Maximilian Partl | Am | 3 |
| (Switzerland) Hofor Racing | Mercedes-AMG GT3 Evo | Mercedes-AMG M159 6.2 L V8 | 11 | (Switzerland) Manuel Metzger | Am | 3 |
| (Germany) Capital RT by Motopark | Mercedes-AMG GT3 Evo | Mercedes-AMG M159 6.2 L V8 | 13 | (Australia) Christian Mansell | Am | 2 |
| (Germany) Capital RT by Motopark | Mercedes-AMG GT3 Evo | Mercedes-AMG M159 6.2 L V8 | 13 | (Mexico) Marcelo Ramirez | Am | 2 |
| (Germany) Capital RT by Motopark | Mercedes-AMG GT3 Evo | Mercedes-AMG M159 6.2 L V8 | 13 | Denis Remenyako | Am | 2 |
| (Germany) Capital RT by Motopark | Mercedes-AMG GT3 Evo | Mercedes-AMG M159 6.2 L V8 | 13 | (Canada) Mikaël Grenier | PA | 3 |
| (Germany) Capital RT by Motopark | Mercedes-AMG GT3 Evo | Mercedes-AMG M159 6.2 L V8 | 13 | (Australia) Christian Mansell | PA | 3 |
| (Germany) Capital RT by Motopark | Mercedes-AMG GT3 Evo | Mercedes-AMG M159 6.2 L V8 | 13 | (Mexico) Marcelo Ramirez | PA | 3 |
| (Germany) Capital RT by Motopark | Mercedes-AMG GT3 Evo | Mercedes-AMG M159 6.2 L V8 | 13 | Denis Remenyako | PA | 3 |
| (Austria) Razoon – more than racing | Porsche 911 GT3 R (992) | Porsche M97/80 4.2 L Flat-6 | 14 | (Denmark) Simon Birch | P | 2–3 |
| (Austria) Razoon – more than racing | Porsche 911 GT3 R (992) | Porsche M97/80 4.2 L Flat-6 | 14 | (Netherlands) Jop Rappange | P | 2–3 |
| (Austria) Razoon – more than racing | Porsche 911 GT3 R (992) | Porsche M97/80 4.2 L Flat-6 | 14 | (Netherlands) Thierry Vermeulen | P | 2 |
| (Austria) Razoon – more than racing | Porsche 911 GT3 R (992) | Porsche M97/80 4.2 L Flat-6 | 14 | (Canada) Bashar Mardini | P | 2 |
| (Austria) Razoon – more than racing | Porsche 911 GT3 R (992) | Porsche M97/80 4.2 L Flat-6 | 14 | (Grenada) Vladislav Lomko | P | 3 |
| (Austria) Razoon – more than racing | Porsche 911 GT3 R (992) | Porsche M97/80 4.2 L Flat-6 | 14 | (Austria) Luca Rettenbacher | P | 3 |
| (Austria) Razoon – more than racing | Porsche 911 GT3 R (992) | Porsche M97/80 4.2 L Flat-6 | 14 | (Austria) Leo Pichler | P | 3 |
| (Germany) Winward Racing | Mercedes-AMG GT3 Evo | Mercedes-AMG M159 6.2 L V8 | 16 | (Netherlands) "Daan Arrow" | P | 2–3 |
| (Germany) Winward Racing | Mercedes-AMG GT3 Evo | Mercedes-AMG M159 6.2 L V8 | 16 | (Germany) Maro Engel | P | 2–3 |
| (Germany) Winward Racing | Mercedes-AMG GT3 Evo | Mercedes-AMG M159 6.2 L V8 | 16 | (Armenia) Sergey Stolyarov | P | 2–3 |
| (Germany) Winward Racing | Mercedes-AMG GT3 Evo | Mercedes-AMG M159 6.2 L V8 | 16 | (Germany) Luca Stolz | P | 3 |
| (Germany) Winward Racing | Mercedes-AMG GT3 Evo | Mercedes-AMG M159 6.2 L V8 | 81 | (Germany) Marvin Dienst | P | 2–3 |
| (Germany) Winward Racing | Mercedes-AMG GT3 Evo | Mercedes-AMG M159 6.2 L V8 | 81 | (Italy) Gabriele Piana | P | 2–3 |
| (Germany) Winward Racing | Mercedes-AMG GT3 Evo | Mercedes-AMG M159 6.2 L V8 | 81 | (Armenia) Rinat Salikhov | P | 2–3 |
| (Germany) Winward Racing | Mercedes-AMG GT3 Evo | Mercedes-AMG M159 6.2 L V8 | 81 | (Italy) Matteo Cairoli | P | 3 |
| (Italy) Fulgenzi Racing | Porsche 911 GT3 R (992) | Porsche M97/80 4.2 L Flat-6 | 17 | (Italy) Enrico Fernando Fulgenzi | PA | 2–3 |
| (Italy) Fulgenzi Racing | Porsche 911 GT3 R (992) | Porsche M97/80 4.2 L Flat-6 | 17 | (Italy) Alessandro Giannone | PA | 2–3 |
| (Italy) Fulgenzi Racing | Porsche 911 GT3 R (992) | Porsche M97/80 4.2 L Flat-6 | 17 | (Italy) Andrea Girondi | PA | 2–3 |
| (Italy) Fulgenzi Racing | Porsche 911 GT3 R (992) | Porsche M97/80 4.2 L Flat-6 | 17 | (United Kingdom) Harley Haughton | PA | 3 |
| (France) Saintéloc Junior Team | Audi R8 LMS Evo II | Audi DAR 5.2 L V10 | 18 | (Austria) Michael Doppelmayr | PA | 3 |
| (France) Saintéloc Junior Team | Audi R8 LMS Evo II | Audi DAR 5.2 L V10 | 18 | (Germany) Elia Erhart | PA | 3 |
| (France) Saintéloc Junior Team | Audi R8 LMS Evo II | Audi DAR 5.2 L V10 | 18 | (Germany) Pierre Kaffer | PA | 3 |
| (France) Saintéloc Junior Team | Audi R8 LMS Evo II | Audi DAR 5.2 L V10 | 18 | (Germany) Swen Herberger | PA | 3 |
| (France) Saintéloc Junior Team | Audi R8 LMS Evo II | Audi DAR 5.2 L V10 | 18 | (France) Stephane Tribaudini | PA | 3 |
| (China) Winhere Origine Motorsport | Porsche 911 GT3 R (992) | Porsche M97/80 4.2 L Flat-6 | 22 | (China) Liu Hangcheng | PA | 2 |
| (China) Winhere Origine Motorsport | Porsche 911 GT3 R (992) | Porsche M97/80 4.2 L Flat-6 | 22 | (China) Wang Zhongwei | PA | 2 |
| (China) Winhere Origine Motorsport | Porsche 911 GT3 R (992) | Porsche M97/80 4.2 L Flat-6 | 22 | (China) Deng Yi | PA | 2 |
| (China) Origine Motorsport (Note: Car No. 87 entered as Origine Motorsport at round 1, and as Origine powered by CC at rounds 2–3.) | Porsche 911 GT3 R (992) | Porsche M97/80 4.2 L Flat-6 | 87 | (China) Leo Ye Hongli | Am | All |
| (China) Origine Motorsport | Porsche 911 GT3 R (992) | Porsche M97/80 4.2 L Flat-6 | 87 | (China) Yuan Bo | Am | All |
| (China) Origine Motorsport | Porsche 911 GT3 R (992) | Porsche M97/80 4.2 L Flat-6 | 87 | (China) Lu Wei | Am | 1–2 |
| (China) Origine Motorsport | Porsche 911 GT3 R (992) | Porsche M97/80 4.2 L Flat-6 | 87 | (China) Liu Hangcheng | Am | 1 |
| (China) Origine Motorsport | Porsche 911 GT3 R (992) | Porsche M97/80 4.2 L Flat-6 | 87 | (China) Deng Yi | Am | 3 |
| (China) Origine Motorsport | Porsche 911 GT3 R (992) | Porsche M97/80 4.2 L Flat-6 | 87 | (Armenia) Artur Goroyan | Am | 3 |
| (China) Origine Motorsport | Porsche 911 GT3 R (992) | Porsche M97/80 4.2 L Flat-6 | 87 | Roman Mavlanov | Am | 3 |
| (Italy) Dinamic GT | Porsche 911 GT3 R (992) | Porsche M97/80 4.2 L Flat-6 | 24 | (Spain) Rafael Durán | Am | 2–3 |
| (Italy) Dinamic GT | Porsche 911 GT3 R (992) | Porsche M97/80 4.2 L Flat-6 | 24 | (Canada) Reinhold Krahn | Am | 2–3 |
| (Italy) Dinamic GT | Porsche 911 GT3 R (992) | Porsche M97/80 4.2 L Flat-6 | 24 | (Austria) Philipp Sager | Am | 2–3 |
| (Italy) Dinamic GT | Porsche 911 GT3 R (992) | Porsche M97/80 4.2 L Flat-6 | 24 | (Sri Lanka) Eshan Pieris | Am | 3 |
| (Italy) Dinamic GT | Porsche 911 GT3 R (992) | Porsche M97/80 4.2 L Flat-6 | 24 | (United Kingdom) Angus Whiteside | Am | 3 |
| (South Africa) Into Africa Racing by Dragon | Ferrari 296 GT3 | Ferrari F163CE 3.0 L Turbo V6 | 25 | (South Africa) Xolile Letlaka | P 2 PA 3 | 2–3 |
| (South Africa) Into Africa Racing by Dragon | Ferrari 296 GT3 | Ferrari F163CE 3.0 L Turbo V6 | 25 | (South Africa) Stuart White | P 2 PA 3 | 2–3 |
| (South Africa) Into Africa Racing by Dragon | Ferrari 296 GT3 | Ferrari F163CE 3.0 L Turbo V6 | 25 | (Zimbabwe) Axcil Jefferies | P 2 PA 3 | 2 |
| (South Africa) Into Africa Racing by Dragon | Ferrari 296 GT3 | Ferrari F163CE 3.0 L Turbo V6 | 25 | (United Kingdom) Glynn Geddie | P 2 PA 3 | 3 |
| (South Africa) Into Africa Racing by Dragon | Ferrari 296 GT3 | Ferrari F163CE 3.0 L Turbo V6 | 25 | (United Kingdom) Jim Geddie | P 2 PA 3 | 3 |
| (South Africa) Into Africa Racing by Dragon | Ferrari 296 GT3 | Ferrari F163CE 3.0 L Turbo V6 | 25 | (South Africa) Arnold Neveling | P 2 PA 3 | 3 |
| (United Arab Emirates) Dragon Racing | Ferrari 296 GT3 | Ferrari F163CE 3.0 L Turbo V6 | 88 | (United Kingdom) John Dhillon | PA | 2 |
| (United Arab Emirates) Dragon Racing | Ferrari 296 GT3 | Ferrari F163CE 3.0 L Turbo V6 | 88 | (Republic of Ireland) Matt Griffin | PA | 2 |
| (United Arab Emirates) Dragon Racing | Ferrari 296 GT3 | Ferrari F163CE 3.0 L Turbo V6 | 88 | (Belgium) Laurent de Meeus | PA | 2 |
| (United Arab Emirates) Dragon Racing | Ferrari 296 GT3 | Ferrari F163CE 3.0 L Turbo V6 | 88 | (United Kingdom) Jamie Stanley | PA | 2 |
| (United Arab Emirates) Dragon Racing | Ferrari 296 GT3 | Ferrari F163CE 3.0 L Turbo V6 | 88 | (Kuwait) Khaled Al Marzouq | PA | 3 |
| (United Arab Emirates) Dragon Racing | Ferrari 296 GT3 | Ferrari F163CE 3.0 L Turbo V6 | 88 | (Italy) Giacomo Altoè | PA | 3 |
| (United Arab Emirates) Dragon Racing | Ferrari 296 GT3 | Ferrari F163CE 3.0 L Turbo V6 | 88 | (Canada) Ramez Azzam | PA | 3 |
| (United Arab Emirates) Dragon Racing | Ferrari 296 GT3 | Ferrari F163CE 3.0 L Turbo V6 | 88 | (Germany) Oliver Goethe | PA | 3 |
| (United Arab Emirates) Dragon Racing | Ferrari 296 GT3 | Ferrari F163CE 3.0 L Turbo V6 | 88 | (United Kingdom) Oscar Ryndziewcz | PA | 3 |
| (Oman) AlManar Racing by Dragon | Ferrari 296 GT3 | Ferrari F163CE 3.0 L Turbo V6 | 777 | (Oman) Al Faisal Al Zubair | P | 3 |
| (Oman) AlManar Racing by Dragon | Ferrari 296 GT3 | Ferrari F163CE 3.0 L Turbo V6 | 777 | (United States) Dustin Blattner | P | 3 |
| (Oman) AlManar Racing by Dragon | Ferrari 296 GT3 | Ferrari F163CE 3.0 L Turbo V6 | 777 | (Zimbabwe) Axcil Jefferies | P | 3 |
| (Oman) AlManar Racing by Dragon | Ferrari 296 GT3 | Ferrari F163CE 3.0 L Turbo V6 | 777 | (Germany) Dennis Marschall | P | 3 |
| (Belgium) Team WRT | BMW M4 GT3 Evo | BMW P58 3.0 L Turbo I6 | 27 | (Kyrgyzstan) Stanislav Minsky | P | 3 |
| (Belgium) Team WRT | BMW M4 GT3 Evo | BMW P58 3.0 L Turbo I6 | 27 | (Belgium) Mathieu Detry | P | 3 |
| (Belgium) Team WRT | BMW M4 GT3 Evo | BMW P58 3.0 L Turbo I6 | 27 | (Germany) Thomas Kiefer | P | 3 |
| (Belgium) Team WRT | BMW M4 GT3 Evo | BMW P58 3.0 L Turbo I6 | 27 | (Germany) Julian Hanses | P | 3 |
| (Belgium) Team WRT | BMW M4 GT3 Evo | BMW P58 3.0 L Turbo I6 | 27 | (Germany) Christopher Haase | P | 3 |
| (Belgium) Team WRT | BMW M4 GT3 Evo | BMW P58 3.0 L Turbo I6 | 669 | (United States) Anthony McIntosh | P | 2–3 |
| (Belgium) Team WRT | BMW M4 GT3 Evo | BMW P58 3.0 L Turbo I6 | 669 | (United Kingdom) Dan Harper | P | 2 |
| (Belgium) Team WRT | BMW M4 GT3 Evo | BMW P58 3.0 L Turbo I6 | 669 | (Canada) Parker Thompson | P | 2 |
| (Belgium) Team WRT | BMW M4 GT3 Evo | BMW P58 3.0 L Turbo I6 | 669 | (South Africa) Kelvin van der Linde | P | 3 |
| (Belgium) Team WRT | BMW M4 GT3 Evo | BMW P58 3.0 L Turbo I6 | 669 | (South Africa) Jordan Pepper | P | 3 |
| (Belgium) Team WRT | BMW M4 GT3 Evo | BMW P58 3.0 L Turbo I6 | 669 | (Spain) Fran Rueda | P | 3 |
| (Belgium) Team WRT | BMW M4 GT3 Evo | BMW P58 3.0 L Turbo I6 | 669 | (United Kingdom) Ben Tuck | P | 3 |
| (France) TFT Racing | Mercedes-AMG GT3 Evo | Mercedes-AMG M159 6.2 L V8 | 28 | (France) Jordan Boisson | PA | 2–3 |
| (France) TFT Racing | Mercedes-AMG GT3 Evo | Mercedes-AMG M159 6.2 L V8 | 28 | (France) Patrick Charlaix | PA | 2–3 |
| (France) TFT Racing | Mercedes-AMG GT3 Evo | Mercedes-AMG M159 6.2 L V8 | 28 | (France) Marvin Klein | PA | 2–3 |
| (France) TFT Racing | Mercedes-AMG GT3 Evo | Mercedes-AMG M159 6.2 L V8 | 28 | (Belgium) Benjamin Paque | PA | 2–3 |
| (United Kingdom) Team Parker Racing | Mercedes-AMG GT3 | Mercedes-AMG M159 6.2 L V8 | 31 | (United Kingdom) Dario Franchitti | PA | 3 |
| (United Kingdom) Team Parker Racing | Mercedes-AMG GT3 | Mercedes-AMG M159 6.2 L V8 | 31 | (United Kingdom) Rob Huff | PA | 3 |
| (United Kingdom) Team Parker Racing | Mercedes-AMG GT3 | Mercedes-AMG M159 6.2 L V8 | 31 | (United Kingdom) Max Lynn | PA | 3 |
| (United Kingdom) Team Parker Racing | Mercedes-AMG GT3 | Mercedes-AMG M159 6.2 L V8 | 31 | (United Kingdom) Shaun Lynn | PA | 3 |
| (United Kingdom) Optimum Motorsport | McLaren 720S GT3 Evo | McLaren M840T 4.0 L Turbo V8 | 39 | (China) Weian Chen | Am | 2 |
| (United Kingdom) Optimum Motorsport | McLaren 720S GT3 Evo | McLaren M840T 4.0 L Turbo V8 | 39 | (China) Huilin Han | Am | 2 |
| (United Kingdom) Optimum Motorsport | McLaren 720S GT3 Evo | McLaren M840T 4.0 L Turbo V8 | 39 | (Hong Kong) Kaishun Liu | Am | 2 |
| (United Kingdom) Optimum Motorsport | McLaren 720S GT3 Evo | McLaren M840T 4.0 L Turbo V8 | 39 | (China) Zhang Yaqi | Am | 2 |
| (United Kingdom) Optimum Motorsport | McLaren 720S GT3 Evo | McLaren M840T 4.0 L Turbo V8 | 74 | (United Kingdom) Andrew Gilbert | P | 2–3 |
| (United Kingdom) Optimum Motorsport | McLaren 720S GT3 Evo | McLaren M840T 4.0 L Turbo V8 | 74 | (United Kingdom) Mikey Porter | P | 2–3 |
| (United Kingdom) Optimum Motorsport | McLaren 720S GT3 Evo | McLaren M840T 4.0 L Turbo V8 | 74 | (Australia) Jayden Kelly | P | 2 |
| (United Kingdom) Optimum Motorsport | McLaren 720S GT3 Evo | McLaren M840T 4.0 L Turbo V8 | 74 | (United Kingdom) Tom Fleming | P | 3 |
| (United Kingdom) Optimum Motorsport | McLaren 720S GT3 Evo | McLaren M840T 4.0 L Turbo V8 | 74 | (Germany) Benjamin Goethe | P | 3 |
| (United Kingdom) Optimum Motorsport | McLaren 720S GT3 Evo | McLaren M840T 4.0 L Turbo V8 | 77 | (United Kingdom) Harry George | P | 3 |
| (United Kingdom) Optimum Motorsport | McLaren 720S GT3 Evo | McLaren M840T 4.0 L Turbo V8 | 77 | (United States) Patrick Liddy | P | 3 |
| (United Kingdom) Optimum Motorsport | McLaren 720S GT3 Evo | McLaren M840T 4.0 L Turbo V8 | 77 | (United States) Tanner Harvey | P | 3 |
| (United Kingdom) Optimum Motorsport | McLaren 720S GT3 Evo | McLaren M840T 4.0 L Turbo V8 | 77 | (Netherlands) Dante Rappange | P | 3 |
| (Slovakia) ARC Bratislava | Lamborghini Huracán GT3 Evo | Lamborghini DGF 5.2 L V10 | 44 | (Slovakia) Adam Konôpka | Am | 2 |
| (Slovakia) ARC Bratislava | Lamborghini Huracán GT3 Evo | Lamborghini DGF 5.2 L V10 | 44 | (Slovakia) Matej Konopka | Am | 2 |
| (Slovakia) ARC Bratislava | Lamborghini Huracán GT3 Evo | Lamborghini DGF 5.2 L V10 | 44 | (Slovakia) Miro Konôpka | Am | 2 |
| (Czech Republic) Scuderia Praha | Ferrari 296 GT3 | Ferrari F163CE 3.0 L Turbo V6 | 56 | (Czech Republic) Josef Král | PA | 2–3 |
| (Czech Republic) Scuderia Praha | Ferrari 296 GT3 | Ferrari F163CE 3.0 L Turbo V6 | 56 | (Slovakia) Matúš Výboh | PA | 2–3 |
| (Czech Republic) Scuderia Praha | Ferrari 296 GT3 | Ferrari F163CE 3.0 L Turbo V6 | 56 | (Slovakia) Miroslav Výboh | PA | 2–3 |
| (Czech Republic) Scuderia Praha | Ferrari 296 GT3 | Ferrari F163CE 3.0 L Turbo V6 | 56 | (Italy) Matteo Malucelli | PA | 3 |
| (Czech Republic) Scuderia Praha | Ferrari 296 GT3 | Ferrari F163CE 3.0 L Turbo V6 | 56 | (Czech Republic) Dennis Waszek | PA | 3 |
| (Japan) LM corsa | Ferrari 296 GT3 | Ferrari F163CE 3.0 L Turbo V6 | 60 | (Japan) Kei Nakanishi | PA | 1 |
| (Japan) LM corsa | Ferrari 296 GT3 | Ferrari F163CE 3.0 L Turbo V6 | 60 | (Germany) Dominik Schwager | PA | 1 |
| (Japan) LM corsa | Ferrari 296 GT3 | Ferrari F163CE 3.0 L Turbo V6 | 60 | (Japan) Shigekazu Wakisaka | PA | 1 |
| (Germany) Leipert Motorsport | Lamborghini Huracán GT3 Evo 2 | Lamborghini DGF 5.2 L V10 | 63 | (Sweden) Axel Bengtsson | P | 1 |
| (Germany) Leipert Motorsport | Lamborghini Huracán GT3 Evo 2 | Lamborghini DGF 5.2 L V10 | 63 | (Sweden) Hampus Ericsson | P | 1 |
| (Germany) Leipert Motorsport | Lamborghini Huracán GT3 Evo 2 | Lamborghini DGF 5.2 L V10 | 63 | (Sweden) Marcus Ericsson | P | 1 |
| (Germany) Leipert Motorsport | Lamborghini Huracán GT3 Evo 2 | Lamborghini DGF 5.2 L V10 | 63 | (Sweden) Thomas Karlsson | P | 1 |
| (Germany) Leipert Motorsport | Lamborghini Huracán GT3 Evo 2 | Lamborghini DGF 5.2 L V10 | 63 | (Germany) Thomas Kiefer | P | 2 |
| (Germany) Leipert Motorsport | Lamborghini Huracán GT3 Evo 2 | Lamborghini DGF 5.2 L V10 | 63 | (New Zealand) Brendon Leitch | P | 2 |
| (Germany) Leipert Motorsport | Lamborghini Huracán GT3 Evo 2 | Lamborghini DGF 5.2 L V10 | 63 | (Kyrgyzstan) Stanislav Minsky | P | 2 |
| (Germany) Leipert Motorsport | Lamborghini Huracán GT3 Evo 2 | Lamborghini DGF 5.2 L V10 | 63 | (Australia) Nicolas Stati | P | 2 |
| (Malaysia) Viper Niza Racing | Mercedes-AMG GT3 Evo | Mercedes-AMG M159 6.2 L V8 | 65 | (Malaysia) Dominic Ang | Am | 1 |
| (Malaysia) Viper Niza Racing | Mercedes-AMG GT3 Evo | Mercedes-AMG M159 6.2 L V8 | 65 | (Malaysia) Douglas Khoo | Am | 1 |
| (Malaysia) Viper Niza Racing | Mercedes-AMG GT3 Evo | Mercedes-AMG M159 6.2 L V8 | 65 | (Malaysia) Melvin Moh | Am | 1 |
| (Austria) SVC Sport Management | Mercedes-AMG GT3 Evo | Mercedes-AMG M159 6.2 L V8 | 67 | (Switzerland) Mauro Calamia | PA | 3 |
| (Austria) SVC Sport Management | Mercedes-AMG GT3 Evo | Mercedes-AMG M159 6.2 L V8 | 67 | (Switzerland) Jean-Luc D'Auria | PA | 3 |
| (Austria) SVC Sport Management | Mercedes-AMG GT3 Evo | Mercedes-AMG M159 6.2 L V8 | 67 | (Italy) Amedeo Pampanini | PA | 3 |
| (Austria) SVC Sport Management | Mercedes-AMG GT3 Evo | Mercedes-AMG M159 6.2 L V8 | 67 | (Italy) Roberto Pampanini | PA | 3 |
| (United Arab Emirates) Continental Racing with Simpson Motorsport | Audi R8 LMS Evo II | Audi DAR 5.2 L V10 | 69 | (Cyprus) Vasily Vladykin | Am | All |
| (United Arab Emirates) Continental Racing with Simpson Motorsport | Audi R8 LMS Evo II | Audi DAR 5.2 L V10 | 69 | (Saint Kitts and Nevis) Alexander Bukhantsov | Am | 1 |
| (United Arab Emirates) Continental Racing with Simpson Motorsport | Audi R8 LMS Evo II | Audi DAR 5.2 L V10 | 69 | (Poland) Damian Ciosek | Am | 1 |
| (United Arab Emirates) Continental Racing with Simpson Motorsport | Audi R8 LMS Evo II | Audi DAR 5.2 L V10 | 69 | (United Kingdom) James Winslow | Am | 1 |
| (United Arab Emirates) Continental Racing with Simpson Motorsport | Audi R8 LMS Evo II | Audi DAR 5.2 L V10 | 69 | (Vanuatu) Alex Novichkov | Am | 2 |
| (United Arab Emirates) Continental Racing with Simpson Motorsport | Audi R8 LMS Evo II | Audi DAR 5.2 L V10 | 69 | (Germany) Alex Aka | Am | 3 |
| (United Arab Emirates) Continental Racing with Simpson Motorsport | Audi R8 LMS Evo II | Audi DAR 5.2 L V10 | 69 | Mikhail Simonov | Am | 3 |
| (United Arab Emirates) Continental Racing with Simpson Motorsport | Audi R8 LMS Evo II | Audi DAR 5.2 L V10 | 69 | (Germany) Paul Scheuschner | Am | 3 |
| (United Arab Emirates) Continental Racing with Simpson Motorsport | Audi R8 LMS Evo II | Audi DAR 5.2 L V10 | 69 | (Kyrgyzstan) Andrey Solukovtsev | Am | 3 |
| (San Marino) Tsunami RT | Porsche 911 GT3 R (992) | Porsche M97/80 4.2 L Flat-6 | 79 | (Italy) Fabio Babini | PA | 3 |
| (San Marino) Tsunami RT | Porsche 911 GT3 R (992) | Porsche M97/80 4.2 L Flat-6 | 79 | (Switzerland) Alex Fontana | PA | 3 |
| (San Marino) Tsunami RT | Porsche 911 GT3 R (992) | Porsche M97/80 4.2 L Flat-6 | 79 | (New Zealand) Daniel Gaunt | PA | 3 |
| (San Marino) Tsunami RT | Porsche 911 GT3 R (992) | Porsche M97/80 4.2 L Flat-6 | 79 | (Italy) Johannes Zelger | PA | 3 |
| (United Arab Emirates) Baron Motorsport | Ferrari 296 GT3 | Ferrari F163CE 3.0 L Turbo V6 | 86 | (Italy) Edoardo Bacci | Am | 2 |
| (United Arab Emirates) Baron Motorsport | Ferrari 296 GT3 | Ferrari F163CE 3.0 L Turbo V6 | 86 | (Austria) Philipp Baron | Am | 2 |
| (United Arab Emirates) Baron Motorsport | Ferrari 296 GT3 | Ferrari F163CE 3.0 L Turbo V6 | 86 | (Austria) Ernst Kirchmayr | Am | 2 |
| (Germany) Lionspeed GP | Porsche 911 GT3 R (992) | Porsche M97/80 4.2 L Flat-6 | 89 | (Belgium) Xavier Knauf | Am | 3 |
| (Germany) Lionspeed GP | Porsche 911 GT3 R (992) | Porsche M97/80 4.2 L Flat-6 | 89 | (Australia) Andres Latorre | Am | 3 |
| (Germany) Lionspeed GP | Porsche 911 GT3 R (992) | Porsche M97/80 4.2 L Flat-6 | 89 | (Luxembourg) Gabriel Rindone | Am | 3 |
| (Germany) Lionspeed GP | Porsche 911 GT3 R (992) | Porsche M97/80 4.2 L Flat-6 | 89 | (Belgium) Gregory Servais | Am | 3 |
| (Lithuania) Pure Rxcing | Porsche 911 GT3 R (992) | Porsche M97/80 4.2 L Flat-6 | 92 | (Denmark) Michelle Gatting | P | 3 |
| (Lithuania) Pure Rxcing | Porsche 911 GT3 R (992) | Porsche M97/80 4.2 L Flat-6 | 92 | (Austria) Max Hofer | P | 3 |
| (Lithuania) Pure Rxcing | Porsche 911 GT3 R (992) | Porsche M97/80 4.2 L Flat-6 | 92 | (Saint Kitts and Nevis) Alex Malykhin (Note: Malykhin is Belarusian, but he competes under a Kittitian licence as Belarusian national emblems were banned by the FIA following the Russian invasion of Ukraine.) | P | 3 |
| (Lithuania) Pure Rxcing | Porsche 911 GT3 R (992) | Porsche M97/80 4.2 L Flat-6 | 92 | (Slovenia) Alexey Nesov | P | 3 |
| (India) Ajith Redant Racing | Mercedes-AMG GT3 Evo | Mercedes-AMG M159 6.2 L V8 | 93 | (Belgium) Kobe de Breucker | PA | All |
| (India) Ajith Redant Racing | Mercedes-AMG GT3 Evo | Mercedes-AMG M159 6.2 L V8 | 93 | (India) Ajith Kumar | PA | All |
| (India) Ajith Redant Racing | Mercedes-AMG GT3 Evo | Mercedes-AMG M159 6.2 L V8 | 93 | (Belgium) Ayrton Redant | PA | All |
| (India) Ajith Redant Racing | Mercedes-AMG GT3 Evo | Mercedes-AMG M159 6.2 L V8 | 93 | (Belgium) Yannick Redant | PA | All |
| (India) Ajith Redant Racing | Mercedes-AMG GT3 Evo | Mercedes-AMG M159 6.2 L V8 | 93 | (France) Romain Vozniak | PA | 3 |
| (Japan) Maezawa Racing | Ferrari 296 GT3 | Ferrari F163CE 3.0 L Turbo V6 | 555 | (Japan) Yusaku Maezawa | PA | 2 |
| (Japan) Maezawa Racing | Ferrari 296 GT3 | Ferrari F163CE 3.0 L Turbo V6 | 555 | (Japan) Naoki Yokomizo | PA | 2 |
| (United Kingdom) Paradine Competition | BMW M4 GT3 Evo | BMW P58 3.0 L Turbo I6 | 991 | (United Kingdom) Darren Leung | P | 3 |
| (United Kingdom) Paradine Competition | BMW M4 GT3 Evo | BMW P58 3.0 L Turbo I6 | 991 | (United Kingdom) James Kellett | P | 3 |
| (United Kingdom) Paradine Competition | BMW M4 GT3 Evo | BMW P58 3.0 L Turbo I6 | 991 | (Brazil) Augusto Farfus | P | 3 |
| (United Kingdom) Paradine Competition | BMW M4 GT3 Evo | BMW P58 3.0 L Turbo I6 | 991 | (United Kingdom) Jamie Day | P | 3 |
| (United Kingdom) Paradine Competition | BMW M4 GT3 Evo | BMW P58 3.0 L Turbo I6 | 991 | (Brazil) Pedro Ebrahim | P | 3 |
| (United Kingdom) Paradine Competition | BMW M4 GT3 Evo | BMW P58 3.0 L Turbo I6 | 992 | (Oman) Ahmad Al Harthy | Am | 3 |
| (United Kingdom) Paradine Competition | BMW M4 GT3 Evo | BMW P58 3.0 L Turbo I6 | 992 | (United Kingdom) Steven Gambrell | Am | 3 |
| (United Kingdom) Paradine Competition | BMW M4 GT3 Evo | BMW P58 3.0 L Turbo I6 | 992 | (United Kingdom) James Kellett | Am | 3 |
| (United Kingdom) Paradine Competition | BMW M4 GT3 Evo | BMW P58 3.0 L Turbo I6 | 992 | (United Kingdom) Darren Leung | Am | 3 |
| (United Kingdom) Paradine Competition | BMW M4 GT3 Evo | BMW P58 3.0 L Turbo I6 | 992 | (United States) Anthony McIntosh | Am | 3 |
| (China) Climax Racing | Mercedes-AMG GT3 Evo | Mercedes-AMG M159 6.2 L V8 | 999 | (China) Li Lichao | PA | 1 |
| (China) Climax Racing | Mercedes-AMG GT3 Evo | Mercedes-AMG M159 6.2 L V8 | 999 | (Thailand) Tanart Sathienthirakul | PA | 1 |
| (China) Climax Racing | Mercedes-AMG GT3 Evo | Mercedes-AMG M159 6.2 L V8 | 999 | (Finland) Elias Seppänen | PA | 1 |
| (China) Climax Racing | Mercedes-AMG GT3 Evo | Mercedes-AMG M159 6.2 L V8 | 999 | (China) Mike Zhou | PA | 1 |
GTX
| (France) Vortex V8 | Vortex 2.0 | Chevrolet LS3 6.2 L V8 | 701 | (France) Lionel Amrouche | All | |
| (France) Vortex V8 | Vortex 2.0 | Chevrolet LS3 6.2 L V8 | 701 | (France) Philippe Bonnel | All | |
| (France) Vortex V8 | Vortex 2.0 | Chevrolet LS3 6.2 L V8 | 701 | (France) Thierry Chkondali | 3 | |
| (France) Vortex V8 | Vortex 2.0 | Chevrolet LS3 6.2 L V8 | 701 | (Belgium) Johan Caeldries | 3 | |
| (Germany) Leipert Motorsport | Lamborghini Huracán Super Trofeo Evo 2 | Lamborghini DGF 5.2 L V10 | 710 | (New Zealand) Brendon Leitch | 3 | |
| (Germany) Leipert Motorsport | Lamborghini Huracán Super Trofeo Evo 2 | Lamborghini DGF 5.2 L V10 | 710 | (Canada) Fred Roberts | 3 | |
| (Germany) Leipert Motorsport | Lamborghini Huracán Super Trofeo Evo 2 | Lamborghini DGF 5.2 L V10 | 710 | (Sweden) Månz Thalin | 3 | |
| (Germany) Leipert Motorsport | Lamborghini Huracán Super Trofeo Evo 2 | Lamborghini DGF 5.2 L V10 | 710 | (United States) Gerhard Watzinger | 3 | |
| (Germany) Leipert Motorsport | Lamborghini Huracán Super Trofeo Evo 2 | Lamborghini DGF 5.2 L V10 | 710 | (United States) Don Yount | 3 | |
| GT3 Poland | Lamborghini Huracán Super Trofeo Evo 2 | Lamborghini DGF 5.2 L V10 | 763 | (Poland) Pawel Kowalski | 3 | |
| GT3 Poland | Lamborghini Huracán Super Trofeo Evo 2 | Lamborghini DGF 5.2 L V10 | 763 | (Poland) Adrian Lewandowski | 3 | |
| GT3 Poland | Lamborghini Huracán Super Trofeo Evo 2 | Lamborghini DGF 5.2 L V10 | 763 | (Poland) Andrzej Lewandowski | 3 | |
| GT3 Poland | Lamborghini Huracán Super Trofeo Evo 2 | Lamborghini DGF 5.2 L V10 | 763 | (Poland) Seweryn Mazur | 3 | |
| GT3 Poland | Lamborghini Huracán Super Trofeo Evo 2 | Lamborghini DGF 5.2 L V10 | 763 | (Poland) Gustaw Wiśniewski | 3 | |
| GT3 Poland | Lamborghini Huracán Super Trofeo Evo 2 | Lamborghini DGF 5.2 L V10 | 764 | (Poland) Adrian Lewandowski | 2 | |
| GT3 Poland | Lamborghini Huracán Super Trofeo Evo 2 | Lamborghini DGF 5.2 L V10 | 764 | (Poland) Andrzej Lewandowski | 2 | |
| (France) Team CMR | Lamborghini Huracán Super Trofeo Evo 2 | Lamborghini DGF 5.2 L V10 | 794 | (Switzerland) Erwin Creed | 3 | |
| (France) Team CMR | Lamborghini Huracán Super Trofeo Evo 2 | Lamborghini DGF 5.2 L V10 | 794 | (France) Ethan Gialdini | 3 | |
| (France) Team CMR | Lamborghini Huracán Super Trofeo Evo 2 | Lamborghini DGF 5.2 L V10 | 794 | (Belgium) Rodrigue Gillion | 3 | |
| (France) Team CMR | Lamborghini Huracán Super Trofeo Evo 2 | Lamborghini DGF 5.2 L V10 | 794 | (France) Hugo Mogica | 3 | |
| (France) Team CMR | Lamborghini Huracán Super Trofeo Evo 2 | Lamborghini DGF 5.2 L V10 | 794 | (France) Eric Mouez | 3 | |
| (France) Team CMR | Ginetta G56 GT2 | Ginetta LS3 6.2 L V8 | 795 | (United Kingdom) Mike Simpson | 2–3 | |
| (France) Team CMR | Ginetta G56 GT2 | Ginetta LS3 6.2 L V8 | 795 | (United Kingdom) Jack Mitchell | 2–3 | |
| (France) Team CMR | Ginetta G56 GT2 | Ginetta LS3 6.2 L V8 | 795 | (France) Nicolas Prost | 3 | |
| (France) Team CMR | Ginetta G56 GT2 | Ginetta LS3 6.2 L V8 | 795 | (United Kingdom) Andrew Bentley | 3 | |
| (France) Rossa Racing | Rossa LM GT | Audi DAR 5.2 L V10 | 797 | (Uzbekistan) Ismail Ahmedkhodjaev | 3 | |
| (France) Rossa Racing | Rossa LM GT | Audi DAR 5.2 L V10 | 797 | (United Arab Emirates) Amna Al Qubaisi | 3 | |
| (France) Rossa Racing | Rossa LM GT | Audi DAR 5.2 L V10 | 797 | Viacheslav Gutak | 3 | |
| (France) Rossa Racing | Rossa LM GT | Audi DAR 5.2 L V10 | 797 | (Cyprus) Evgeny Kireev | 3 | |
| (France) Rossa Racing | Rossa LM GT | Audi DAR 5.2 L V10 | 797 | Roman Rusinov | 3 | |
992
| (Hong Kong) Modena Motorsports | Porsche 992 GT3 Cup | Porsche 4.0 L Flat-6 | 216 | (Canada) Christian Chia | Am | 1, 3 |
| (Hong Kong) Modena Motorsports | Porsche 992 GT3 Cup | Porsche 4.0 L Flat-6 | 216 | (Denmark) Benny Simonsen | Am | 1, 3 |
| (Hong Kong) Modena Motorsports | Porsche 992 GT3 Cup | Porsche 4.0 L Flat-6 | 216 | (Canada) John Shen | Am | 1, 3 |
| (Hong Kong) Modena Motorsports | Porsche 992 GT3 Cup | Porsche 4.0 L Flat-6 | 216 | (Netherlands) Francis Tjia | Am | 1, 3 |
| (Hong Kong) Modena Motorsports | Porsche 992 GT3 Cup | Porsche 4.0 L Flat-6 | 216 | (France) Philippe Descombes | Am | 3 |
| (China) 610 Racing | Porsche 992 GT3 Cup | Porsche 4.0 L Flat-6 | 666 | (China) Cao Qikuan | Am | 1 |
| (China) 610 Racing | Porsche 992 GT3 Cup | Porsche 4.0 L Flat-6 | 666 | (China) Li Lin | Am | 1 |
| (China) 610 Racing | Porsche 992 GT3 Cup | Porsche 4.0 L Flat-6 | 666 | (Macau) Lu Zhiwei | Am | 1 |
| (China) 610 Racing | Porsche 992 GT3 Cup | Porsche 4.0 L Flat-6 | 666 | (Canada) Yang Haojie | Am | 1 |
| (France) SebLajoux Racing | Porsche 992 GT3 Cup | Porsche 4.0 L Flat-6 | 888 | (France) Stephane Perrin | Am | 2–3 |
| (France) SebLajoux Racing | Porsche 992 GT3 Cup | Porsche 4.0 L Flat-6 | 888 | (France) Louis Perrot | Am | 2–3 |
| (France) SebLajoux Racing | Porsche 992 GT3 Cup | Porsche 4.0 L Flat-6 | 888 | (United Kingdom) Anthony Vince | Am | 2–3 |
| (France) SebLajoux Racing | Porsche 992 GT3 Cup | Porsche 4.0 L Flat-6 | 888 | (Kazakhstan) Alexandr Artemyev | Am | 3 |
| (France) SebLajoux Racing | Porsche 992 GT3 Cup | Porsche 4.0 L Flat-6 | 888 | (France) Sebastien Lajoux | Am | 3 |
| (France) SebLajoux Racing | Porsche 992 GT3 Cup | Porsche 4.0 L Flat-6 | 910 | (France) Solenn Amrouche | Am | 2 |
| (France) SebLajoux Racing | Porsche 992 GT3 Cup | Porsche 4.0 L Flat-6 | 910 | Alexey Markov | Am | 2 |
| (France) SebLajoux Racing | Porsche 992 GT3 Cup | Porsche 4.0 L Flat-6 | 910 | (France) Lionel Rigaud | Am | 2 |
| (France) SebLajoux Racing | Porsche 992 GT3 Cup | Porsche 4.0 L Flat-6 | 910 | (France) Solenn Amrouche | P | 3 |
| (France) SebLajoux Racing | Porsche 992 GT3 Cup | Porsche 4.0 L Flat-6 | 910 | (France) Enzo Joulié | P | 3 |
| (France) SebLajoux Racing | Porsche 992 GT3 Cup | Porsche 4.0 L Flat-6 | 910 | (France) Mathys Jaubert | P | 3 |
| (France) SebLajoux Racing | Porsche 992 GT3 Cup | Porsche 4.0 L Flat-6 | 910 | (France) Sebastien Lajoux | P | 3 |
| (France) SebLajoux Racing | Porsche 992 GT3 Cup | Porsche 4.0 L Flat-6 | 910 | (France) Louis Perrot | P | 3 |
| (Netherlands) Red Camel-Jordans.nl | Porsche 992 GT3 Cup | Porsche 4.0 L Flat-6 | 909 | (Netherlands) Ivo Breukers | P | All |
| (Netherlands) Red Camel-Jordans.nl | Porsche 992 GT3 Cup | Porsche 4.0 L Flat-6 | 909 | (Netherlands) Luc Breukers | P | All |
| (Netherlands) Red Camel-Jordans.nl | Porsche 992 GT3 Cup | Porsche 4.0 L Flat-6 | 909 | (Netherlands) Rik Breukers | P | All |
| (Netherlands) Red Camel-Jordans.nl | Porsche 992 GT3 Cup | Porsche 4.0 L Flat-6 | 909 | (Switzerland) Fabian Danz | P | 2–3 |
| (Austria) Razoon – more than racing | Porsche 992 GT3 Cup | Porsche 4.0 L Flat-6 | 914 | (Austria) Daniel Drexel | P | 2–3 |
| (Austria) Razoon – more than racing | Porsche 992 GT3 Cup | Porsche 4.0 L Flat-6 | 914 | (Kyrgyzstan) Ivan Stanchin | P | 2–3 |
| (Austria) Razoon – more than racing | Porsche 992 GT3 Cup | Porsche 4.0 L Flat-6 | 914 | (Poland) Artur Chwist | P | 2 |
| (Austria) Razoon – more than racing | Porsche 992 GT3 Cup | Porsche 4.0 L Flat-6 | 914 | (Grenada) Vladislav Lomko | P | 2 |
| (Austria) Razoon – more than racing | Porsche 992 GT3 Cup | Porsche 4.0 L Flat-6 | 914 | (Germany) Colin Bönighausen | P | 3 |
| (Austria) Razoon – more than racing | Porsche 992 GT3 Cup | Porsche 4.0 L Flat-6 | 914 | (Russia) Ivan Ovsienko | P | 3 |
| (Austria) Razoon – more than racing | Porsche 992 GT3 Cup | Porsche 4.0 L Flat-6 | 914 | (Netherlands) Senna van Soelen | P | 3 |
| (United Arab Emirates) RABDAN by Fulgenzi Racing | Porsche 992 GT3 Cup | Porsche 4.0 L Flat-6 | 971 | (United Arab Emirates) Saif Alameri | Am | 2–3 |
| (United Arab Emirates) RABDAN by Fulgenzi Racing | Porsche 992 GT3 Cup | Porsche 4.0 L Flat-6 | 971 | (United Arab Emirates) Salem Alketbi | Am | 2–3 |
| (United Arab Emirates) RABDAN by Fulgenzi Racing | Porsche 992 GT3 Cup | Porsche 4.0 L Flat-6 | 971 | (Austria) Christopher Zöchling | Am | 2–3 |
| (United Arab Emirates) RABDAN by Fulgenzi Racing | Porsche 992 GT3 Cup | Porsche 4.0 L Flat-6 | 971 | (United States) Arthur Simondet | Am | 3 |
| (Belgium) Mühlner Motorsport | Porsche 992 GT3 Cup | Porsche 4.0 L Flat-6 | 921 | (Netherlands) Paul Meijer | P | All |
| (Belgium) Mühlner Motorsport | Porsche 992 GT3 Cup | Porsche 4.0 L Flat-6 | 921 | (China) Liang Jiatong | P | 1, 3 |
| (Belgium) Mühlner Motorsport | Porsche 992 GT3 Cup | Porsche 4.0 L Flat-6 | 921 | (Denmark) Conrad Tox Leveau | P | 2–3 |
| (Belgium) Mühlner Motorsport | Porsche 992 GT3 Cup | Porsche 4.0 L Flat-6 | 921 | (Australia) Bayley Hall | P | 1 |
| (Belgium) Mühlner Motorsport | Porsche 992 GT3 Cup | Porsche 4.0 L Flat-6 | 921 | (Latvia) Valters Zviedris | P | 1 |
| (Belgium) Mühlner Motorsport | Porsche 992 GT3 Cup | Porsche 4.0 L Flat-6 | 921 | (Canada) Mark J Thomas | P | 2 |
| (Belgium) Mühlner Motorsport | Porsche 992 GT3 Cup | Porsche 4.0 L Flat-6 | 921 | (Netherlands) Jurriaan de Back | P | 3 |
| (France) Chazel Technologie Course | Porsche 992 GT3 Cup | Porsche 4.0 L Flat-6 | 920 | (France) Jean-Paul Dominici | Am | 2 |
| (France) Chazel Technologie Course | Porsche 992 GT3 Cup | Porsche 4.0 L Flat-6 | 920 | (France) Jean-Mathieu Leandri | Am | 2 |
| (France) Chazel Technologie Course | Porsche 992 GT3 Cup | Porsche 4.0 L Flat-6 | 920 | Ivan Ovsienko | Am | 2 |
| (Belgium) Red Ant Racing | Porsche 992 GT3 Cup | Porsche 4.0 L Flat-6 | 924 | (Belgium) Simon Balcaen | Am | 3 |
| (Belgium) Red Ant Racing | Porsche 992 GT3 Cup | Porsche 4.0 L Flat-6 | 924 | (Belgium) Mathieu Castelein | Am | 3 |
| (Belgium) Red Ant Racing | Porsche 992 GT3 Cup | Porsche 4.0 L Flat-6 | 924 | (Belgium) Pierre Castelein | Am | 3 |
| (Belgium) Red Ant Racing | Porsche 992 GT3 Cup | Porsche 4.0 L Flat-6 | 924 | (France) Steven Palette | Am | 3 |
| (France) Crubilé Sport | Porsche 992 GT3 Cup | Porsche 4.0 L Flat-6 | 925 | (France) Sebastién Crubile | Am | 2–3 |
| (France) Crubilé Sport | Porsche 992 GT3 Cup | Porsche 4.0 L Flat-6 | 925 | (France) Pascal Duhamel | Am | 2–3 |
| (France) Crubilé Sport | Porsche 992 GT3 Cup | Porsche 4.0 L Flat-6 | 925 | (France) Anthony Plessis | Am | 3 |
| (Japan) Norik Racing by HRT Performance | Porsche 992 GT3 Cup | Porsche 4.0 L Flat-6 | 928 | (Japan) Taku Bamba | Am | 2 |
| (Japan) Norik Racing by HRT Performance | Porsche 992 GT3 Cup | Porsche 4.0 L Flat-6 | 928 | (Japan) Norikazu Shibata | Am | 2 |
| (Japan) Norik Racing by HRT Performance | Porsche 992 GT3 Cup | Porsche 4.0 L Flat-6 | 928 | (United Arab Emirates) David Tan | Am | 2 |
| (Germany) HRT Performance | Porsche 992 GT3 Cup | Porsche 4.0 L Flat-6 | 928 | (France) Stéphane Adler | Am | 3 |
| (Germany) HRT Performance | Porsche 992 GT3 Cup | Porsche 4.0 L Flat-6 | 928 | (France) Michael Blanchemain | Am | 3 |
| (Germany) HRT Performance | Porsche 992 GT3 Cup | Porsche 4.0 L Flat-6 | 928 | (France) Jérôme Da Costa | Am | 3 |
| (Germany) HRT Performance | Porsche 992 GT3 Cup | Porsche 4.0 L Flat-6 | 928 | (South Africa) Ryan Naicker | Am | 3 |
| (Germany) HRT Performance | Porsche 992 GT3 Cup | Porsche 4.0 L Flat-6 | 929 | (United States) Gregg Gorski | Am | 2–3 |
| (Germany) HRT Performance | Porsche 992 GT3 Cup | Porsche 4.0 L Flat-6 | 929 | (United Arab Emirates) Giovanni Nucera | Am | 2–3 |
| (Germany) HRT Performance | Porsche 992 GT3 Cup | Porsche 4.0 L Flat-6 | 929 | (South Africa) Marius Jackson | Am | 2 |
| (Germany) HRT Performance | Porsche 992 GT3 Cup | Porsche 4.0 L Flat-6 | 929 | (United Kingdom) Steven Gambrell | Am | 3 |
| (Germany) HRT Performance | Porsche 992 GT3 Cup | Porsche 4.0 L Flat-6 | 929 | (Switzerland) Silvain Pastoris | Am | 3 |
| (Germany) HRT Performance | Porsche 992 GT3 Cup | Porsche 4.0 L Flat-6 | 932 | (India) Akhil Agarwal | Am | 2 |
| (Germany) HRT Performance | Porsche 992 GT3 Cup | Porsche 4.0 L Flat-6 | 932 | (United Kingdom) Jon Lancaster | Am | 2 |
| (Germany) HRT Performance | Porsche 992 GT3 Cup | Porsche 4.0 L Flat-6 | 932 | (Lebanon) Rawad Sarieddine | Am | 2 |
| (Germany) X Motorsport by HRT Performance | Porsche 992 GT3 Cup | Porsche 4.0 L Flat-6 | 930 | Sergey Titarenko | Am | 2–3 |
| (Germany) X Motorsport by HRT Performance | Porsche 992 GT3 Cup | Porsche 4.0 L Flat-6 | 930 | Victor Titarenko | Am | 2–3 |
| (Germany) X Motorsport by HRT Performance | Porsche 992 GT3 Cup | Porsche 4.0 L Flat-6 | 930 | Mikhail Loboda | Am | 2–3 |
| (Germany) X Motorsport by HRT Performance | Porsche 992 GT3 Cup | Porsche 4.0 L Flat-6 | 930 | Ilya Gorin | Am | 3 |
| (Germany) X Motorsport by HRT Performance | Porsche 992 GT3 Cup | Porsche 4.0 L Flat-6 | 930 | (Portugal) Igor Sorokin | Am | 3 |
| (Germany) ARMotors by HRT Performance | Porsche 992 GT3 Cup | Porsche 4.0 L Flat-6 | 931 | (United Kingdom) Steve Gambrell | Am | 2 |
| (Germany) ARMotors by HRT Performance | Porsche 992 GT3 Cup | Porsche 4.0 L Flat-6 | 931 | (South Africa) Ryan Naicker | Am | 2 |
| (Germany) ARMotors by HRT Performance | Porsche 992 GT3 Cup | Porsche 4.0 L Flat-6 | 931 | (Portugal) Igor Sorokin | Am | 2 |
| (Germany) ARMotors by HRT Performance | Porsche 992 GT3 Cup | Porsche 4.0 L Flat-6 | 931 | Grigorii Burlutskii | Am | 3 |
| (Germany) ARMotors by HRT Performance | Porsche 992 GT3 Cup | Porsche 4.0 L Flat-6 | 931 | (United Kingdom) Nick Halstead | Am | 3 |
| (Germany) ARMotors by HRT Performance | Porsche 992 GT3 Cup | Porsche 4.0 L Flat-6 | 931 | (Germany) Maya Hartge | Am | 3 |
| (Germany) ARMotors by HRT Performance | Porsche 992 GT3 Cup | Porsche 4.0 L Flat-6 | 931 | (Germany) Alex Renner | Am | 3 |
| (Germany) ARMotors by HRT Performance | Porsche 992 GT3 Cup | Porsche 4.0 L Flat-6 | 931 | Dmitriy Shishko | Am | 3 |
| (Qatar) QMMF by HRT Performance | Porsche 992 GT3 Cup | Porsche 4.0 L Flat-6 | 974 | (Qatar) Ahmed Al Emadi | Am | 2 |
| (Qatar) QMMF by HRT Performance | Porsche 992 GT3 Cup | Porsche 4.0 L Flat-6 | 974 | (Qatar) Jassim Al Thani | Am | 2 |
| (Qatar) QMMF by HRT Performance | Porsche 992 GT3 Cup | Porsche 4.0 L Flat-6 | 974 | (Qatar) Faesal Al Yafei | Am | 2 |
| (Netherlands) Team GP Elite | Porsche 992 GT3 Cup | Porsche 4.0 L Flat-6 | 939 | (Finland) Jukka Honkavuori | Am | 3 |
| (Netherlands) Team GP Elite | Porsche 992 GT3 Cup | Porsche 4.0 L Flat-6 | 939 | (Finland) Jani Käkelä | Am | 3 |
| (Netherlands) Team GP Elite | Porsche 992 GT3 Cup | Porsche 4.0 L Flat-6 | 939 | (Estonia) Thomas Kangro | Am | 3 |
| (Netherlands) Team GP Elite | Porsche 992 GT3 Cup | Porsche 4.0 L Flat-6 | 939 | (Finland) Henri Tuomaala | Am | 3 |
| (New Zealand) EBM | Porsche 992 GT3 Cup | Porsche 4.0 L Flat-6 | 952 | (Singapore) Josh Berry | P | 2 |
| (New Zealand) EBM | Porsche 992 GT3 Cup | Porsche 4.0 L Flat-6 | 952 | (France) Alessandro Ghiretti | P | 2 |
| (Netherlands) Tierra Outdoor Racing by Fach Auto Tech | Porsche 992 GT3 Cup | Porsche 4.0 L Flat-6 | 962 | (Netherlands) Wouter Boerekamps | P | 3 |
| (Netherlands) Tierra Outdoor Racing by Fach Auto Tech | Porsche 992 GT3 Cup | Porsche 4.0 L Flat-6 | 962 | (Netherlands) Huub van Eijndhoven | P | 3 |
| (Netherlands) Tierra Outdoor Racing by Fach Auto Tech | Porsche 992 GT3 Cup | Porsche 4.0 L Flat-6 | 962 | (Netherlands) Robert de Haan | P | 3 |
| (Netherlands) Tierra Outdoor Racing by Fach Auto Tech | Porsche 992 GT3 Cup | Porsche 4.0 L Flat-6 | 962 | (Netherlands) Ralph Poppelaars | P | 3 |
| (Austria) Neuhofer Rennsport | Porsche 992 GT3 Cup | Porsche 4.0 L Flat-6 | 985 | (Germany) Felix Neuhofer | Am 2 P 3 | 2–3 |
| (Austria) Neuhofer Rennsport | Porsche 992 GT3 Cup | Porsche 4.0 L Flat-6 | 985 | (Austria) Markus Neuhofer | Am 2 P 3 | 2–3 |
| (Austria) Neuhofer Rennsport | Porsche 992 GT3 Cup | Porsche 4.0 L Flat-6 | 985 | (Germany) David von Rosen | Am 2 P 3 | 2 |
| (Austria) Neuhofer Rennsport | Porsche 992 GT3 Cup | Porsche 4.0 L Flat-6 | 985 | (Austria) Martin Ragginger | Am 2 P 3 | 3 |
| (Austria) Neuhofer Rennsport | Porsche 992 GT3 Cup | Porsche 4.0 L Flat-6 | 985 | (Germany) Sebastian Schmitt | Am 2 P 3 | 3 |
| (Austria) Neuhofer Rennsport | Porsche 992 GT3 Cup | Porsche 4.0 L Flat-6 | 985 | (Austria) Helmut Roedig | Am 2 P 3 | 3 |
GT4
| (Germany) SRS Team Sorg Rennsport | Porsche 718 Cayman GT4 RS Clubsport | Porsche MDG.GA 4.0 L Flat-6 | 427 | (Mexico) Benito Tagle | 2–3 | |
| (Germany) SRS Team Sorg Rennsport | Porsche 718 Cayman GT4 RS Clubsport | Porsche MDG.GA 4.0 L Flat-6 | 427 | Roman Tishchenkov | 2–3 | |
| (Germany) SRS Team Sorg Rennsport | Porsche 718 Cayman GT4 RS Clubsport | Porsche MDG.GA 4.0 L Flat-6 | 427 | (Germany) Stefan Beyer | 2 | |
| (Germany) SRS Team Sorg Rennsport | Porsche 718 Cayman GT4 RS Clubsport | Porsche MDG.GA 4.0 L Flat-6 | 427 | (Germany) Stephan Epp | 3 | |
| (Germany) SRS Team Sorg Rennsport | Porsche 718 Cayman GT4 RS Clubsport | Porsche MDG.GA 4.0 L Flat-6 | 427 | (Germany) Nick von Essen | 3 | |
| (France) Circuit Toys | Toyota GR Supra GT4 Evo2 | Toyota B58B30 3.0 L Turbo I6 | 444 | (United Kingdom) Klaas Kooiker | 2 | |
| (France) Circuit Toys | Toyota GR Supra GT4 Evo2 | Toyota B58B30 3.0 L Turbo I6 | 444 | (United Kingdom) Will Powell | 2 | |
| (France) Circuit Toys | Toyota GR Supra GT4 Evo2 | Toyota B58B30 3.0 L Turbo I6 | 444 | (United States) Arthur Simondet | 2 | |
| (France) Circuit Toys | Toyota GR Supra GT4 Evo2 | Toyota B58B30 3.0 L Turbo I6 | 444 | (United Arab Emirates) Ahmed Al Khaja | 3 | |
| (France) Circuit Toys | Toyota GR Supra GT4 Evo2 | Toyota B58B30 3.0 L Turbo I6 | 444 | (United Kingdom) Rhys Lloyd | 3 | |
| (France) Circuit Toys | Toyota GR Supra GT4 Evo2 | Toyota B58B30 3.0 L Turbo I6 | 444 | (United Kingdom) Edward Mcdermott | 3 | |
| (France) Circuit Toys | Toyota GR Supra GT4 Evo2 | Toyota B58B30 3.0 L Turbo I6 | 444 | (United Kingdom) Jack Meakin | 3 | |
| (France) Circuit Toys | Toyota GR Supra GT4 Evo2 | Toyota B58B30 3.0 L Turbo I6 | 444 | (United Kingdom) Harri Reynolds | 3 | |
| (Germany) Cerny Motorsport | BMW M4 GT4 (G82) | BMW S58B30T0 3.0 L Turbo I6 | 445 | (France) Joshua Bednarski | 2–3 | |
| (Germany) Cerny Motorsport | BMW M4 GT4 (G82) | BMW S58B30T0 3.0 L Turbo I6 | 445 | Ivan Krapivtsev | 2–3 | |
| (Germany) Cerny Motorsport | BMW M4 GT4 (G82) | BMW S58B30T0 3.0 L Turbo I6 | 445 | (Germany) Florian Sternkopf | 2–3 | |
| (Germany) Cerny Motorsport | BMW M4 GT4 (G82) | BMW S58B30T0 3.0 L Turbo I6 | 445 | (Australia) Bryce Fullwood | 1 | |
| (Germany) Cerny Motorsport | BMW M4 GT4 (G82) | BMW S58B30T0 3.0 L Turbo I6 | 445 | (Australia) Damien Hamilton | 1 | |
| (Germany) Cerny Motorsport | BMW M4 GT4 (G82) | BMW S58B30T0 3.0 L Turbo I6 | 445 | (United States) Spencer Propper | 1 | |
| (Germany) Cerny Motorsport | BMW M4 GT4 (G82) | BMW S58B30T0 3.0 L Turbo I6 | 445 | (United States) Alec Udell | 1 | |
| (Germany) Cerny Motorsport | BMW M4 GT4 (G82) | BMW S58B30T0 3.0 L Turbo I6 | 445 | (Germany) Henry Cerny | 2 | |
| (Germany) Cerny Motorsport | BMW M4 GT4 (G82) | BMW S58B30T0 3.0 L Turbo I6 | 445 | (United Kingdom) Shiv Sapra | 3 | |
| (Sweden) Primus Racing | Audi R8 LMS GT4 Evo | Audi DAR 5.2 L V10 | 451 | (Sweden) Peter Larsen | 2 | |
| (Sweden) Primus Racing | Audi R8 LMS GT4 Evo | Audi DAR 5.2 L V10 | 451 | (Sweden) Tommy Lindroth | 2 | |
| (Sweden) Primus Racing | Audi R8 LMS GT4 Evo | Audi DAR 5.2 L V10 | 451 | (Sweden) Johan Rosen | 2 | |
TC / TCX
| (Germany) asBest Racing | SEAT León Cup Racer | Cupra CJX 2.0 L I4 | 101 | (Germany) Henrik Seibel | TX | 2–3 |
| (Germany) asBest Racing | SEAT León Cup Racer | Cupra CJX 2.0 L I4 | 101 | (Germany) Christian Ladurner | TX | 2 |
| (Germany) asBest Racing | SEAT León Cup Racer | Cupra CJX 2.0 L I4 | 101 | (Germany) Pia Ohlsson | TX | 2 |
| (Germany) asBest Racing | SEAT León Cup Racer | Cupra CJX 2.0 L I4 | 101 | (Switzerland) Thomas Alpiger | TX | 3 |
| (Germany) asBest Racing | SEAT León Cup Racer | Cupra CJX 2.0 L I4 | 101 | (Bangladesh) H M Tahuid Anwar Avik | TX | 3 |
| (Germany) asBest Racing | SEAT León Cup Racer | Cupra CJX 2.0 L I4 | 101 | (India) Fahad Nasir Khan | TX | 3 |
| (Germany) asBest Racing | SEAT León Cup Racer | Cupra CJX 2.0 L I4 | 101 | (Switzerland) Michael Neuhauser | TX | 3 |
| (Germany) asBest Racing | Cupra León TCR | Cupra DNPA 2.0 L I4 | 102 | (Germany) Lutz Obermann | TX | All |
| (Germany) asBest Racing | Cupra León TCR | Cupra DNPA 2.0 L I4 | 102 | (Germany) Pia Ohlsson | TX | All |
| (Germany) asBest Racing | Cupra León TCR | Cupra DNPA 2.0 L I4 | 102 | (Japan) Junichi Umemoto | TX | 1, 3 |
| (Germany) asBest Racing | Cupra León TCR | Cupra DNPA 2.0 L I4 | 102 | (Brazil) Silas Passos | TX | 2–3 |
| (Germany) asBest Racing | Cupra León TCR | Cupra DNPA 2.0 L I4 | 102 | (Germany) Sebastian Schemmann | TX | 2–3 |
| (Germany) asBest Racing | Volkswagen Golf GTI TCR | Volkswagen CJXG 2.0 L I4 | 103 | (United Arab Emirates) Ahmed Al Khaja | TX | 2 |
| (Germany) asBest Racing | Volkswagen Golf GTI TCR | Volkswagen CJXG 2.0 L I4 | 103 | (Bangladesh) H M Tahuid Anwar Avik | TX | 2 |
| (Germany) asBest Racing | Volkswagen Golf GTI TCR | Volkswagen CJXG 2.0 L I4 | 103 | (India) Fahad Nasir Khan | TX | 2 |
| (Germany) asBest Racing | Volkswagen Golf GTI TCR | Volkswagen CJXG 2.0 L I4 | 103 | (Poland) Rafal Gieras | TX | 3 |
| (Germany) asBest Racing | Volkswagen Golf GTI TCR | Volkswagen CJXG 2.0 L I4 | 103 | (United Arab Emirates) Ahmed Al Melaihi | TX | 3 |
| (Germany) asBest Racing | Volkswagen Golf GTI TCR | Volkswagen CJXG 2.0 L I4 | 103 | (United Kingdom) James Walker | TX | 3 |
| (Germany) asBest Racing | Volkswagen Golf GTI TCR | Volkswagen CJXG 2.0 L I4 | 103 | (United Arab Emirates) Karim Zuhour | TX | 3 |
| (Germany) asBest Racing | Volkswagen Golf GTI TCR | Volkswagen CJXG 2.0 L I4 | 103 | (United Arab Emirates) Nadir Zuhour | TX | 3 |
| (Germany) asBest Racing | Porsche 718 Cayman GT4 Clubsport | Porsche MDG.GA 4.0 L Flat-6 | 111 | (Switzerland) Marco Grillil | TX | 2–3 |
| (Germany) asBest Racing | Porsche 718 Cayman GT4 Clubsport | Porsche MDG.GA 4.0 L Flat-6 | 111 | (South Africa) Dylan Pragji | TX | 2–3 |
| (Germany) asBest Racing | Porsche 718 Cayman GT4 Clubsport | Porsche MDG.GA 4.0 L Flat-6 | 111 | (United Kingdom) Zaamin Jaffer | TX | 2–3 |
| (Germany) asBest Racing | Porsche 718 Cayman GT4 Clubsport | Porsche MDG.GA 4.0 L Flat-6 | 111 | (Germany) Desirée Müller | TX | 2–3 |
| (Germany) asBest Racing | Porsche 718 Cayman GT4 Clubsport | Porsche MDG.GA 4.0 L Flat-6 | 111 | (Lebanon) Rawad Sarieddine | TX | 2–3 |
| (Germany) asBest Racing | Porsche 718 Cayman GT4 Clubsport | Porsche MDG.GA 4.0 L Flat-6 | 111 | (United Kingdom) Shiraz Khan | TX | 2 |
| (Germany) asBest Racing | Porsche 718 Cayman GT4 Clubsport | Porsche MDG.GA 4.0 L Flat-6 | 111 | (Pakistan) Usmaan Mughal | TX | 2 |
| (Japan) Toyota Gazoo Rookie Racing | Toyota GR Supra GT4 Evo "B-spec" | Toyota B58B30 3.0 L Turbo I6 | 107 | (Japan) Miki Onaga | TC | 3 |
| (Japan) Toyota Gazoo Rookie Racing | Toyota GR Supra GT4 Evo "B-spec" | Toyota B58B30 3.0 L Turbo I6 | 107 | (Japan) Aimi Saito | TC | 3 |
| (Japan) Toyota Gazoo Rookie Racing | Toyota GR Supra GT4 Evo "B-spec" | Toyota B58B30 3.0 L Turbo I6 | 107 | (Japan) Rami Sasaki | TC | 3 |
| (Japan) Toyota Gazoo Rookie Racing | Toyota GR Supra GT4 Evo "B-spec" | Toyota B58B30 3.0 L Turbo I6 | 107 | (Japan) Kokoro Sato | TC | 3 |
| (Japan) Toyota Gazoo Rookie Racing | Toyota GR Supra GT4 Evo "B-spec" | Toyota B58B30 3.0 L Turbo I6 | 107 | (Japan) Rio Shimono | TC | 3 |
| (Hong Kong) KCMG | Toyota GR Supra GT4 Evo "B-spec" | Toyota B58B30 3.0 L Turbo I6 | 108 | (Hong Kong) Paul Ip | TC | 3 |
| (Hong Kong) KCMG | Toyota GR Supra GT4 Evo "B-spec" | Toyota B58B30 3.0 L Turbo I6 | 108 | (Hong Kong) Marchy Lee | TC | 3 |
| (Hong Kong) KCMG | Toyota GR Supra GT4 Evo "B-spec" | Toyota B58B30 3.0 L Turbo I6 | 108 | (Hong Kong) Ho-Pin Tung | TC | 3 |
| (Hong Kong) KCMG | Toyota GR Supra GT4 Evo "B-spec" | Toyota B58B30 3.0 L Turbo I6 | 108 | (Hong Kong) Andy Yan | TC | 3 |
| (Germany) SRS Team Sorg Rennsport | Porsche 718 Cayman GT4 Clubsport | Porsche MDG.GA 4.0 L Flat-6 | 127 | (Germany) Darian Donkel | TX | 3 |
| (Germany) SRS Team Sorg Rennsport | Porsche 718 Cayman GT4 Clubsport | Porsche MDG.GA 4.0 L Flat-6 | 127 | (Armenia) Ivan Ekelchik | TX | 3 |
| (Germany) SRS Team Sorg Rennsport | Porsche 718 Cayman GT4 Clubsport | Porsche MDG.GA 4.0 L Flat-6 | 127 | Azat Kalimullin | TX | 3 |
| (Germany) SRS Team Sorg Rennsport | Porsche 718 Cayman GT4 Clubsport | Porsche MDG.GA 4.0 L Flat-6 | 127 | (Russia) Nikita Kulkov | TX | 3 |
| (Germany) SRS Team Sorg Rennsport | Porsche 718 Cayman GT4 Clubsport | Porsche MDG.GA 4.0 L Flat-6 | 127 | (Germany) Aaron Wenisch | TX | 3 |
| (United Kingdom) CWS Engineering | Ginetta G55 Supercup | Ford Duratec 37 3.7 L V6 | 178 | (United Kingdom) Ryan Savage | TX | 2 |
| (United Kingdom) CWS Engineering | Ginetta G55 Supercup | Ford Duratec 37 3.7 L V6 | 178 | (United Kingdom) Colin White | TX | 2 |
| (France) Chazel Technologie Course | Alpine A110 Cup | Alpine M5P400 1.8 L Turbo I4 | 193 | (France) Xavier Follenfant | TX | 2 |
| (France) Chazel Technologie Course | Alpine A110 Cup | Alpine M5P400 1.8 L Turbo I4 | 193 | (France) Loic Labeda | TX | 2 |
| (France) Chazel Technologie Course | Alpine A110 Cup | Alpine M5P400 1.8 L Turbo I4 | 193 | (France) Benoist Rousset | TX | 2 |

GT3 entries
| Icon | Class |
|---|---|
| P | GT3-Pro |
| PA | GT3-Pro Am |
| Am | GT3-Am |
992 entries
| Icon | Class |
| P | 992-Pro |
| Am | 992-Am |
TC entries
| Icon | Class |
| TC | TC |
| TX | TCX |

== Race results ==
Bold indicates overall winner.

| Event | Circuit | GT3 Winners | GT3-Pro Am Winners | GT3-Am Winners | GTX Winners | 992 Winners | 992-Am Winners | GT4 Winners | TCX Winners | Report |
|---|---|---|---|---|---|---|---|---|---|---|
| 1 | (Malaysia) Sepang International Circuit | (Hong Kong) No. 10 Absolute Racing | (Germany) No. 91 Herberth Motorsport | **(China) No. 87 Origine Motorsport** | No finishers | (Netherlands) No. 909 Red Camel-Jordans.nl | (Hong Kong) No. 216 Modena Motorsports | (Germany) No. 445 Cerny Motorsport | (Germany) No. 102 AsBest Racing | Report |
| 1 | (Malaysia) Sepang International Circuit | (Hong Kong) Antares Au (Netherlands) Loek Hartog (Switzerland) Patric Niederhauser | (Germany) Ralf Bohn (Germany) Constantin Dressler (Germany) Alfred Renauer (Germany) Robert Renauer | **(China) Liu Hangcheng** **(China) Lu Wei** **(China) Ye Hongli** **(China) Yuan Bo** | No finishers | (Netherlands) Ivo Breukers (Netherlands) Luc Breukers (Netherlands) Rik Breukers (Australia) Adrian Flack | (Canada) Christian Chia (Denmark) Benny Simonsen (Canada) John Shen (Netherlands) Francis Tjia | (Australia) Bryce Fullwood (Australia) Damien Hamilton (United States) Spencer Propper (United States) Alec Udell | (Germany) Lutz Obermann (Germany) Pia Ohlsson (Germany) Sebastian Schemmann (Japan) Junichi Umemoto | Report |
| 2 | (United Arab Emirates) Yas Marina Circuit | **(Germany) No. 10 Herberth Motorsport** | (Germany) No. 269 Herberth Motorsport | (Antigua and Barbuda) No. 21 HAAS RT | (France) No. 701 Vortex V8 | (Qatar) No. 974 QMMF by HRT Performance | (Qatar) No. 974 QMMF by HRT Performance | (Germany) No. 445 Cerny Motorsport | (France) No. 193 Chazel Technologie Course | Report |
| 2 | (United Arab Emirates) Yas Marina Circuit | **(Hong Kong) Antares Au** **(Netherlands) Loek Hartog** **(Netherlands) Huub van Eijndhoven** | (Germany) Vincent Kolb (Germany) Max Moritz (Germany) Sven Müller | (Belgium) Nicolas Guelinckx (Belgium) Peter Guelinckx (Saint Kitts and Nevis) Amir Feyzulin | (France) Lionel Amrouche (France) Boillot | (Qatar) Ahmed Al Emadi (Qatar) Jassim Al Thani (Qatar) Faesal Al Yafei | (Qatar) Ahmed Al Emadi (Qatar) Jassim Al Thani (Qatar) Faesal Al Yafei | (France) Joshua Bednarski (Germany) Henry Cerny (Russia) Ivan Krapistsev (Germany) Florian Sternkopf | (France) Xavier Follenfant (France) Loic Labeda (France) Benoist Rousset | Report |
| 3 | (United Arab Emirates) Dubai Autodrome | **(Belgium) No. 669 Team WRT** | (Germany) No. 10 Herberth Motorsport | (United Arab Emirates) No. 69 Continental Racing with Simpson Motorsport | (Germany) No. 710 Leipert Motorsport | (Netherlands) No. 962 Tierra Outdoor Racing by Fach Auto Tech | (Belgium) No. 924 Red Ant Racing | (Germany) No. 445 Cerny Motorsport | (Germany) No. 102 asBest Racing | Report |
| 3 | (United Arab Emirates) Dubai Autodrome | **(South Africa) Kelvin van der Linde** **(United States) Anthony McIntosh** **(South Africa) Jordan Pepper** **(Spain) Fran Rueda** **(United Kingdom) Ben Tuck** | (Hong Kong) Antares Au (Germany) Ralf Bohn (Netherlands) Loek Hartog (Germany) Joel Sturm | (Germany) Alex Aka (Germany) Paul Scheuschner; Mikhail Simonov; Andrey Solukovtsev (Cyprus) Vasily Vladykin | (New Zealand) Brendon Leitch (Canada) Fred Roberts (Sweden) Mänz Thalin (United States) Don Yount (United States) Gerhard Watzinger | (Netherlands) Wouter Boerekamps (Netherlands) Huub van Eijndhoven (Netherlands) Robert de Haan (Netherlands) Ralph Poppelaars | (Belgium) Simon Balcaen (Belgium) Mathieu Castelein (Belgium) Pierre Castelein (France) Steven Palette | (France) Joshua Bednarski; Ivan Krapivtsev (United Kingdom) Shiv Sapra (Germany) Florian Sternkopf | (Germany) Pia Ohlsson (Germany) Lutz Obermann (Japan) Junichi Umemoto (Brazil) Silas Passos (Germany) Sebastian Schemmann | Report |
