= 2025 12 Hours of Malaysia =

Sporting event

The layout of the Sepang International Circuit, where the race was held.

The 2025 12 Hours of Malaysia (formally known as the 2025 Michelin 12 Hours of Malaysia), was the first running of the event, an endurance race that took place at the Sepang International Circuit on 6 December 2025. The race was the first round of the 2025–26 24H Series Middle East.

== Schedule ==
Date	Time (local: MST)	Event	Duration
Friday, 5 December	11:00 - 13:00	Free Practice	2 Hours
Friday, 5 December	16:00 - 16:55	Qualifying	3x15 Minutes
Saturday, 6 December	10:00 - 22:00	Race	12 Hours

== Entries ==
The entry list was announced on 25 November 2025, and featured 17 entries over 5 classes – 10 in GT3, 1 in GTX, 4 in 992, 1 in GT4 and 1 in TCX.

Team	Car	Engine	No.	Drivers	Class
GT3
(Hong Kong) Absolute Racing	Porsche 911 GT3 R (992)	Porsche M97/80 4.2 L Flat-6	10	(Hong Kong) Antares Au	P
(Hong Kong) Absolute Racing	Porsche 911 GT3 R (992)	Porsche M97/80 4.2 L Flat-6	10	(Netherlands) Loek Hartog	P
(Hong Kong) Absolute Racing	Porsche 911 GT3 R (992)	Porsche M97/80 4.2 L Flat-6	10	(Switzerland) Patric Niederhauser	P
(Thailand) Winhere B-Quik Absolute Racing	Porsche 911 GT3 R (992)	Porsche M97/80 4.2 L Flat-6	26	(China) Deng Yi	PA
(Thailand) Winhere B-Quik Absolute Racing	Porsche 911 GT3 R (992)	Porsche M97/80 4.2 L Flat-6	26	(France) Alessandro Ghiretti	PA
(Thailand) Winhere B-Quik Absolute Racing	Porsche 911 GT3 R (992)	Porsche M97/80 4.2 L Flat-6	26	(Netherlands) Henk Kiks	PA
(Thailand) Winhere B-Quik Absolute Racing	Porsche 911 GT3 R (992)	Porsche M97/80 4.2 L Flat-6	26	(China) "Vincenzo Ricci"	PA
(Japan) LM corsa	Ferrari 296 GT3	Ferrari F163CE 3.0 L Turbo V6	60	(Japan) Kei Nakanishi	PA
(Japan) LM corsa	Ferrari 296 GT3	Ferrari F163CE 3.0 L Turbo V6	60	(Germany) Dominik Schwager	PA
(Japan) LM corsa	Ferrari 296 GT3	Ferrari F163CE 3.0 L Turbo V6	60	(Japan) Shigekazu Wakisaka	PA
(Germany) Leipert Motorsport	Lamborghini Huracán GT3 Evo 2	Lamborghini DGF 5.2 L V10	63	(Sweden) Axel Bengtsson	P
(Germany) Leipert Motorsport	Lamborghini Huracán GT3 Evo 2	Lamborghini DGF 5.2 L V10	63	(Sweden) Hampus Ericsson	P
(Germany) Leipert Motorsport	Lamborghini Huracán GT3 Evo 2	Lamborghini DGF 5.2 L V10	63	(Sweden) Marcus Ericsson	P
(Germany) Leipert Motorsport	Lamborghini Huracán GT3 Evo 2	Lamborghini DGF 5.2 L V10	63	(Sweden) Thomas Karlsson	P
(Malaysia) Viper Niza Racing	Mercedes-AMG GT3 Evo	Mercedes-AMG M159 6.2 L V8	65	(Malaysia) Dominic Ang	Am
(Malaysia) Viper Niza Racing	Mercedes-AMG GT3 Evo	Mercedes-AMG M159 6.2 L V8	65	(Malaysia) Douglas Khoo	Am
(Malaysia) Viper Niza Racing	Mercedes-AMG GT3 Evo	Mercedes-AMG M159 6.2 L V8	65	(Malaysia) Melvin Moh	Am
(United Arab Emirates) Continental Racing with Simpson Motorsport	Audi R8 LMS Evo II	Audi DAR 5.2 L V10	69	(Saint Kitts and Nevis) Alexander Bukhantsov	Am
(United Arab Emirates) Continental Racing with Simpson Motorsport	Audi R8 LMS Evo II	Audi DAR 5.2 L V10	69	(Poland) Damian Ciosek	Am
(United Arab Emirates) Continental Racing with Simpson Motorsport	Audi R8 LMS Evo II	Audi DAR 5.2 L V10	69	(Cyprus) Vasily Vladykin	Am
(United Arab Emirates) Continental Racing with Simpson Motorsport	Audi R8 LMS Evo II	Audi DAR 5.2 L V10	69	(United Kingdom) James Winslow	Am
(China) Origine Motorsport	Porsche 911 GT3 R (992)	Porsche M97/80 4.2 L Flat-6	87	(China) Liu Hangcheng	Am
(China) Origine Motorsport	Porsche 911 GT3 R (992)	Porsche M97/80 4.2 L Flat-6	87	(China) Lu Wei	Am
(China) Origine Motorsport	Porsche 911 GT3 R (992)	Porsche M97/80 4.2 L Flat-6	87	(China) Ye Hongli	Am
(China) Origine Motorsport	Porsche 911 GT3 R (992)	Porsche M97/80 4.2 L Flat-6	87	(China) Yuan Bo	Am
(Germany) Herberth Motorsport	Porsche 911 GT3 R (992)	Porsche M97/80 4.2 L Flat-6	91	(Germany) Ralf Bohn	PA
(Germany) Herberth Motorsport	Porsche 911 GT3 R (992)	Porsche M97/80 4.2 L Flat-6	91	(Germany) Constantin Dressler	PA
(Germany) Herberth Motorsport	Porsche 911 GT3 R (992)	Porsche M97/80 4.2 L Flat-6	91	(Germany) Alfred Renauer	PA
(Germany) Herberth Motorsport	Porsche 911 GT3 R (992)	Porsche M97/80 4.2 L Flat-6	91	(Germany) Robert Renauer	PA
(India) Ajith Redant Racing	Mercedes-AMG GT3 Evo	Mercedes-AMG M159 6.2 L V8	93	(Belgium) Kobe de Breucker	PA
(India) Ajith Redant Racing	Mercedes-AMG GT3 Evo	Mercedes-AMG M159 6.2 L V8	93	(India) Ajith Kumar	PA
(India) Ajith Redant Racing	Mercedes-AMG GT3 Evo	Mercedes-AMG M159 6.2 L V8	93	(Belgium) Ayrton Redant	PA
(India) Ajith Redant Racing	Mercedes-AMG GT3 Evo	Mercedes-AMG M159 6.2 L V8	93	(Belgium) Yannick Redant	PA
(China) Climax Racing	Mercedes-AMG GT3 Evo	Mercedes-AMG M159 6.2 L V8	999	(China) Li Lichao	PA
(China) Climax Racing	Mercedes-AMG GT3 Evo	Mercedes-AMG M159 6.2 L V8	999	(Thailand) Tanart Sathienthirakul	PA
(China) Climax Racing	Mercedes-AMG GT3 Evo	Mercedes-AMG M159 6.2 L V8	999	(Finland) Elias Seppänen	PA
(China) Climax Racing	Mercedes-AMG GT3 Evo	Mercedes-AMG M159 6.2 L V8	999	(China) Mike Zhou	PA
GTX
(France) Vortex V8	Vortex 2.0	Chevrolet LS3 6.2 L V8	701	(France) Lionel Amrouche	
(France) Vortex V8	Vortex 2.0	Chevrolet LS3 6.2 L V8	701	(France) Philippe Bonnel	
(France) Vortex V8	Vortex 2.0	Chevrolet LS3 6.2 L V8	701	(France) Victor Moutinho	
992
(Hong Kong) Modena Motorsports	Porsche 992 GT3 Cup	Porsche 4.0 L Flat-6	216	(Canada) Christian Chia	Am
(Hong Kong) Modena Motorsports	Porsche 992 GT3 Cup	Porsche 4.0 L Flat-6	216	(Denmark) Benny Simonsen	Am
(Hong Kong) Modena Motorsports	Porsche 992 GT3 Cup	Porsche 4.0 L Flat-6	216	(Canada) John Shen	Am
(Hong Kong) Modena Motorsports	Porsche 992 GT3 Cup	Porsche 4.0 L Flat-6	216	(Netherlands) Francis Tjia	Am
(China) 610 Racing	Porsche 992 GT3 Cup	Porsche 4.0 L Flat-6	666	(China) Cao Qikuan	Am
(China) 610 Racing	Porsche 992 GT3 Cup	Porsche 4.0 L Flat-6	666	(China) Li Lin	Am
(China) 610 Racing	Porsche 992 GT3 Cup	Porsche 4.0 L Flat-6	666	(China) Lu Zhiwei	Am
(China) 610 Racing	Porsche 992 GT3 Cup	Porsche 4.0 L Flat-6	666	(China) Yang Haojie	Am
(Netherlands) Red Camel-Jordans.nl	Porsche 992 GT3 Cup	Porsche 4.0 L Flat-6	909	(Netherlands) Ivo Breukers	P
(Netherlands) Red Camel-Jordans.nl	Porsche 992 GT3 Cup	Porsche 4.0 L Flat-6	909	(Netherlands) Luc Breukers	P
(Netherlands) Red Camel-Jordans.nl	Porsche 992 GT3 Cup	Porsche 4.0 L Flat-6	909	(Netherlands) Rik Breukers	P
(Netherlands) Red Camel-Jordans.nl	Porsche 992 GT3 Cup	Porsche 4.0 L Flat-6	909	(Australia) Adrian Flack	P
(Belgium) Mühlner Motorsport	Porsche 992 GT3 Cup	Porsche 4.0 L Flat-6	921	(Australia) Bayley Hall	P
(Belgium) Mühlner Motorsport	Porsche 992 GT3 Cup	Porsche 4.0 L Flat-6	921	(China) Liang Jiatong	P
(Belgium) Mühlner Motorsport	Porsche 992 GT3 Cup	Porsche 4.0 L Flat-6	921	(Netherlands) Paul Meijer	P
(Belgium) Mühlner Motorsport	Porsche 992 GT3 Cup	Porsche 4.0 L Flat-6	921	(Latvia) Valters Zviedris	P
GT4
(Germany) Cerny Motorsport	BMW M4 GT4 (G82)	BMW S58B30T0 3.0 L Twin Turbo I6	445	(Australia) Bryce Fullwood	
(Germany) Cerny Motorsport	BMW M4 GT4 (G82)	BMW S58B30T0 3.0 L Twin Turbo I6	445	(Australia) Damien Hamilton	
(Germany) Cerny Motorsport	BMW M4 GT4 (G82)	BMW S58B30T0 3.0 L Twin Turbo I6	445	(United States) Spencer Propper	
(Germany) Cerny Motorsport	BMW M4 GT4 (G82)	BMW S58B30T0 3.0 L Twin Turbo I6	445	(United States) Alec Udell	
TCX
(Germany) AsBest Racing	Cupra TCR DSG	Volkswagen EA888 2.0 L I4	102	(Germany) Lutz Obermann	
(Germany) AsBest Racing	Cupra TCR DSG	Volkswagen EA888 2.0 L I4	102	(Germany) Pia Ohlsson	
(Germany) AsBest Racing	Cupra TCR DSG	Volkswagen EA888 2.0 L I4	102	(Germany) Sebastian Schemmann	
(Germany) AsBest Racing	Cupra TCR DSG	Volkswagen EA888 2.0 L I4	102	(Japan) Junichi Umemoto	

GT3 entries
Icon	Class
P	GT3-Pro
PA	GT3-Pro Am
Am	GT3-Am
992 entries
Icon	Class
P	992-Pro
Am	992-Am

== Qualifying ==
Qualifying was split into three parts with the average of the best times per qualifying session determined the starting order. Climax Racing secured pole position with a combined average time of 2:04.556.

=== Qualifying results ===
Pole position winners in each class are marked in bold.

Pos.	Class	No.	Team	Avg
1	**GT3 Pro/Am**	**999**	**(China) Climax Racing**	**2:04.556**
2	**GT3 Pro**	**10**	**(Hong Kong) Absolute Racing**	**2:04.573**
3	**GT3 Am**	**87**	**(China) Origine Motorsport**	**2:04.867**
4	GT3 Pro/Am	26	(Thailand) Winhere B-Quik Absolute Racing	2:05.550
5	GT3 Pro/Am	93	(India) Ajith Redant Racing	2:06.136
6	GT3 Am	65	(Malaysia) Viper Niza Racing	2:06.215
7	GT3 Pro/Am	60	(Japan) LM corsa	2:06.624
8	GT3 Pro	63	(Germany) Leipert Motorsport	2:07.607
9	**992 Pro**	**909**	**(Netherlands) Red Camel-Jordans.nl**	**2:09.330**
10	992 Pro	921	(Belgium) Mühlner Motorsport	2:09.379
11	**992 Am**	**666**	**(China) 610 Racing**	**2:12.072**
12	992 Am	216	(Hong Kong) Modena Motorsports	2:13.167
13	**GT4**	**445**	**(Germany) Cerny Motorsport**	**2:17.709**
14	**GTX**	**701**	**(France) Vortex V8**	**2:17.780**
15	**TCX**	**102**	**(Germany) AsBest Racing**	**2:26.805**
16	GT3 Am	69	(United Arab Emirates) Continental Racing with Simpson Motorsport	No time established
17	GT3 Pro/Am	91	(Germany) Herberth Motorsport	No time established

== Race ==
The race was won overall by the No. 87 Origine Motorsport Porsche followed by the No. 10 Absolute Racing Porsche in second and the No. 69 Continental Racing with Simpson Motorsport Audi in third. The No. 91 Herbeth Motorsport Porsche crossed the line first but was handed a four-lap penalty for a drive time infringement of its two Bronze-rated drivers, Dressler and Bohn.

=== Race results ===
Class winners in bold.

Pos	Class	No.	Team	Drivers	Chassis	Laps	Time/Retired
Pos	Class	No.	Team	Drivers	Engine	Laps	Time/Retired
1	**GT3 Am**	**87**	**(China) Origine Motorsport**	**(China) Liu Hangcheng** **(China) Lu Wei** **(China) Ye Hongli** **(China) Yuan Bo**	**Porsche 911 GT3 R (992)**	**319**	**12:00:53.438**
1	**GT3 Am**	**87**	**(China) Origine Motorsport**	**(China) Liu Hangcheng** **(China) Lu Wei** **(China) Ye Hongli** **(China) Yuan Bo**	**Porsche M97/80 4.2 L Flat-6**	**319**	**12:00:53.438**
2	**GT3 Pro**	**10**	**(Hong Kong) Absolute Racing**	**(Hong Kong) Antares Au** **(Netherlands) Loek Hartog** **(Switzerland) Patric Niederhauser**	**Porsche 911 GT3 R (992)**	**319**	**+33.214**
2	**GT3 Pro**	**10**	**(Hong Kong) Absolute Racing**	**(Hong Kong) Antares Au** **(Netherlands) Loek Hartog** **(Switzerland) Patric Niederhauser**	**Porsche M97/80 4.2 L Flat-6**	**319**	**+33.214**
3	GT3 Am	69	(United Arab Emirates) Continental Racing with Simpson Motorsport	(Saint Kitts and Nevis) Alexander Bukhantsov (Poland) Damian Ciosek (Cyprus) Vasily Vladykin (United Kingdom) James Winslow	Audi R8 LMS Evo II	317	+2 laps
3	GT3 Am	69	(United Arab Emirates) Continental Racing with Simpson Motorsport	(Saint Kitts and Nevis) Alexander Bukhantsov (Poland) Damian Ciosek (Cyprus) Vasily Vladykin (United Kingdom) James Winslow	Audi DAR 5.2 L V10	317	+2 laps
4	**GT3 Pro/Am**	**91**	**(Germany) Herberth Motorsport**	**(Germany) Ralf Bohn** **(Germany) Constantin Dressler** **(Germany) Alfred Renauer** **(Germany) Robert Renauer**	**Porsche 911 GT3 R (992)**	**315**	**+4 laps**
4	**GT3 Pro/Am**	**91**	**(Germany) Herberth Motorsport**	**(Germany) Ralf Bohn** **(Germany) Constantin Dressler** **(Germany) Alfred Renauer** **(Germany) Robert Renauer**	**Porsche M97/80 4.2 L Flat-6**	**315**	**+4 laps**
5	GT3 Pro/Am	999	(China) Climax Racing	(China) Li Lichao (Thailand) Tanart Sathienthirakul (Finland) Elias Seppänen (China) Mike Zhou	Mercedes-AMG GT3 Evo	315	+4 laps
5	GT3 Pro/Am	999	(China) Climax Racing	(China) Li Lichao (Thailand) Tanart Sathienthirakul (Finland) Elias Seppänen (China) Mike Zhou	Mercedes-AMG M159 6.2 L V8	315	+4 laps
6 DNF	GT3 Pro/Am	26	(Thailand) Winhere B-Quik Absolute Racing	(China) Deng Yi (France) Alessandro Ghiretti (Netherlands) Henk Kiks (China) "Vincenzo Ricci"	Porsche 911 GT3 R (992)	315	+4 laps
6 DNF	GT3 Pro/Am	26	(Thailand) Winhere B-Quik Absolute Racing	(China) Deng Yi (France) Alessandro Ghiretti (Netherlands) Henk Kiks (China) "Vincenzo Ricci"	Porsche M97/80 4.2 L Flat-6	315	+4 laps
7	GT3 Pro/Am	93	(India) Ajith Redant Racing	(Belgium) Kobe de Breucker (India) Ajith Kumar (Belgium) Ayrton Redant (Belgium) Yannick Redant	Mercedes-AMG GT3 Evo	311	+8 laps
7	GT3 Pro/Am	93	(India) Ajith Redant Racing	(Belgium) Kobe de Breucker (India) Ajith Kumar (Belgium) Ayrton Redant (Belgium) Yannick Redant	Mercedes-AMG M159 6.2 L V8	311	+8 laps
8	GT3 Am	65	(Malaysia) Viper Niza Racing	(Malaysia) Dominic Ang (Malaysia) Douglas Khoo (Malaysia) Melvin Moh	Mercedes-AMG GT3 Evo	311	+8 laps
8	GT3 Am	65	(Malaysia) Viper Niza Racing	(Malaysia) Dominic Ang (Malaysia) Douglas Khoo (Malaysia) Melvin Moh	Mercedes-AMG M159 6.2 L V8	311	+8 laps
9	GT3 Pro	63	(Germany) Leipert Motorsport	(Sweden) Axel Bengtsson (Sweden) Hampus Ericsson (Sweden) Marcus Ericsson (Sweden) Thomas Karlsson	Lamborghini Huracán GT3 Evo 2	307	+12 laps
9	GT3 Pro	63	(Germany) Leipert Motorsport	(Sweden) Axel Bengtsson (Sweden) Hampus Ericsson (Sweden) Marcus Ericsson (Sweden) Thomas Karlsson	Lamborghini DGF 5.2 L V10	307	+12 laps
10	**992 Pro**	**909**	**(Netherlands) Red Camel-Jordans.nl**	**(Netherlands) Ivo Breukers** **(Netherlands) Luc Breukers** **(Netherlands) Rik Breukers** **(Australia) Adrian Flack**	**Porsche 992 GT3 Cup**	**305**	**+14 laps**
10	**992 Pro**	**909**	**(Netherlands) Red Camel-Jordans.nl**	**(Netherlands) Ivo Breukers** **(Netherlands) Luc Breukers** **(Netherlands) Rik Breukers** **(Australia) Adrian Flack**	**Porsche 4.0 L Flat-6**	**305**	**+14 laps**
11	**992 Am**	**216**	**(Hong Kong) Modena Motorsports**	**(Canada) Christian Chia** **(Denmark) Benny Simonsen** **(Canada) John Shen** **(Netherlands) Francis Tjia**	**Porsche 992 GT3 Cup**	**303**	**+16 laps**
11	**992 Am**	**216**	**(Hong Kong) Modena Motorsports**	**(Canada) Christian Chia** **(Denmark) Benny Simonsen** **(Canada) John Shen** **(Netherlands) Francis Tjia**	**Porsche 4.0 L Flat-6**	**303**	**+16 laps**
12 DNF	GT3 Pro/Am	60	(Japan) LM corsa	(Japan) Kei Nakanishi (Germany) Dominik Schwager (Japan) Shigekazu Wakisaka	Ferrari 296 GT3	289	+30 laps
12 DNF	GT3 Pro/Am	60	(Japan) LM corsa	(Japan) Kei Nakanishi (Germany) Dominik Schwager (Japan) Shigekazu Wakisaka	Ferrari F163CE 3.0 L Turbo V6	289	+30 laps
13	992 Am	666	(China) 610 Racing	(China) Cao Qikuan (China) Li Lin (China) Lu Zhiwei (China) Yang Haojie	Porsche 992 GT3 Cup	285	+34 laps
13	992 Am	666	(China) 610 Racing	(China) Cao Qikuan (China) Li Lin (China) Lu Zhiwei (China) Yang Haojie	Porsche 4.0 L Flat-6	285	+34 laps
14	992 Pro	921	(Belgium) Mühlner Motorsport	(Australia) Bayley Hall (China) Liang Jiatong (Netherlands) Paul Meijer (Latvia) Valters Zviedris	Porsche 992 GT3 Cup	283	+36 laps
14	992 Pro	921	(Belgium) Mühlner Motorsport	(Australia) Bayley Hall (China) Liang Jiatong (Netherlands) Paul Meijer (Latvia) Valters Zviedris	Porsche 4.0 L Flat-6	283	+36 laps
15	**GT4**	**445**	**(Germany) Cerny Motorsport**	**(Australia) Bryce Fullwood** **(Australia) Damien Hamilton** **(United States) Spencer Propper** **(United States) Alec Udell**	**BMW M4 GT4 (G82)**	**273**	**+46 laps**
15	**GT4**	**445**	**(Germany) Cerny Motorsport**	**(Australia) Bryce Fullwood** **(Australia) Damien Hamilton** **(United States) Spencer Propper** **(United States) Alec Udell**	**BMW S58B30T0 3.0 L Twin Turbo I6**	**273**	**+46 laps**
16	**TCX**	**102**	**(Germany) AsBest Racing**	**(Germany) Lutz Obermann** **(Germany) Pia Ohlsson** **(Germany) Sebastian Schemmann** **(Japan) Junichi Umemoto**	**Cupra TCR DSG**	**261**	**+58 laps**
16	**TCX**	**102**	**(Germany) AsBest Racing**	**(Germany) Lutz Obermann** **(Germany) Pia Ohlsson** **(Germany) Sebastian Schemmann** **(Japan) Junichi Umemoto**	**Volkswagen EA888 2.0 L I4**	**261**	**+58 laps**
17 DNF	GTX	701	(France) Vortex V8	(France) Lionel Amrouche (France) Philippe Bonnel (France) Victor Moutinho	Vortex 2.0	168	Gearbox
17 DNF	GTX	701	(France) Vortex V8	(France) Lionel Amrouche (France) Philippe Bonnel (France) Victor Moutinho	Chevrolet LS3 6.2 L V8	168	Gearbox
