= Rossa Cars =

Car manufacturer

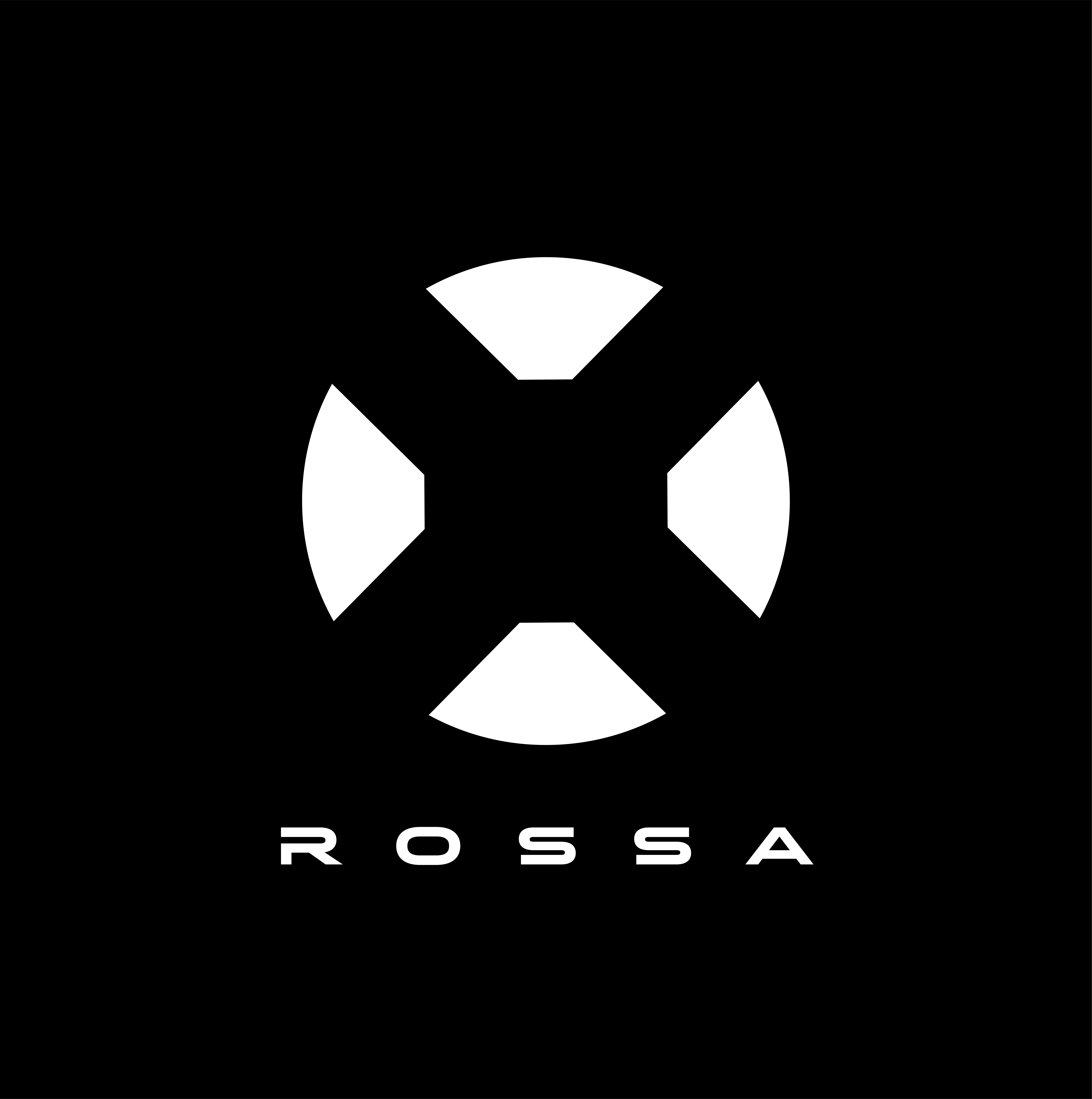
- Type: Private
- Industry: Automotive
- Founded: 2023
- Founder: Roman Rusinov
- Products: Supercars, Racing cars
- Production output: 2023–present
- Website: rossa-cars.com

Rossa Cars is a low-volume supercar manufacturer founded by endurance racing driver Roman Rusinov in 2023. The company develops both road and racing vehicles and operates an associated endurance racing programme. Its models are based on carbon-fibre monocoque structures and are powered by naturally aspirated V10 engines. The platform supports both road-legal and race-specification variants developed according to contemporary GT2 and GT3 regulations.

The company's first vehicle, the Rossa Concept, was introduced in 2023 as a prototype demonstrating the technical architecture of the LM GT platform. The race-specification Rossa LM GT made its international debut in the GTX class at the 24H Dubai in January 2025 in collaboration with Graff Racing.

== History ==
=== Origins and foundation ===
Rossa Cars was founded in 2023 by endurance racing driver Roman Rusinov. The project was publicly announced following registration of the Rossa trademark and initial media coverage of a new supercar programme.

=== Early development ===
The Rossa Concept was revealed in November 2023 as the first vehicle under the brand. It featured a carbon-fibre monocoque chassis and a mid-mounted naturally aspirated V10 engine, previewing the technical layout of the later LM GT platform. A prototype was tested under both road and track conditions to validate chassis, aerodynamics, and powertrain before the development of racing versions.

=== Racing debut and LM GT programme ===
The Rossa LM GT made its competitive debut in January 2025 at the 24H Dubai endurance race in the GTX class, entered by Graff Racing. The LM GT platform continued development in both road-legal and race-specification configurations, including LM GT1, LM GT2, and LM GT3 variants derived from a common carbon-fibre monocoque.

=== Ongoing development ===
During 2025, Rossa conducted private testing at Portimão and MotorLand Aragón circuits. In May 2025, a LM GT was entered in the Ultimate Cup Series.

In January 2026, Rossa Racing returned to 24H Dubai in the GTX class. The car completed approximately 20 hours of running before retiring following an on-track incident; the driver exited uninjured. The result highlighted the effectiveness of the car's carbon-fibre survival cell.

== Model line-up ==
=== Rossa Concept ===
The Rossa Concept was introduced in 2023. It was built around a carbon-fibre monocoque chassis and powered by a naturally aspirated V10 engine. Two prototypes were produced, including a track-tested and a road-legal version. The Concept features a hybrid carbon-fiber monocoque chassis construction used in LMP1/LMP2 sports prototypes. This design provides exceptional torsional rigidity exceeding 120,000 N·m/deg, with interior elements integrated into the structure for enhanced occupant protection. Front and rear crumple zones are made from aluminum alloy, while subframes use high-strength aerospace steel.

=== Rossa LM GT2/GT3 (race car) ===
The Rossa LM GT was designed to meet GT2/GT3 class regulations from the outset, achieving the maximum permitted width of 2 metres without requiring wheel arch extensions or additional aerodynamic elements. The LM GT race cars debuted at the 2025 24H Dubai in the GTX class.

The chassis is engineered for easy adaptation to various engine configurations, both naturally aspirated and turbocharged. Initial production examples feature a 5.2-litre naturally aspirated V10.

The carbon-fibre monocoque follows Le Mans prototype design principles, providing high safety standards, reduced weight, and exceptional chassis rigidity. Front and rear carbon crash boxes, thick foam-filled carbon doors, and carbon door hinges further enhance occupant protection.

The fuel tank is positioned within the chassis behind the driver for optimal safety during accidents. The bodywork generates over 1,250 kg of downforce at 300 km/h.

It features double wishbone suspension with horizontal dampers front and rear, plus third elements acting as anti-roll bars to maintain stability as downforce increases. Additional rear side radiators ensure effective cooling without dirty airflow contamination.

=== Rossa LM GT1 (road car) ===
The Rossa LM GT1 is a street-legal variant derived from the LM GT racing platform. It shares the carbon-fibre monocoque structure with the race cars and is powered by a naturally aspirated 5.2-litre V10 engine. The LM GT1 includes suspension adjustments and modifications for road legality.

== Motorsport ==
Racing experience informs the design and engineering of road-going vehicles, allowing innovations from the track to be adapted to street-legal models. The LM GT platform shares a common chassis between road and race variants, enabling transfer of aerodynamic, suspension, and safety improvements. This approach draws on founder Roman Rusinov's endurance racing background, prioritizing long-stint drivability and structural integrity.

Rossa's programme focuses primarily on endurance racing. The LM GT2 and LM GT3 cars are developed to comply with GT2 and GT3 regulations and emphasize reliability, aerodynamics, and driver safety. The programme made its international debut in January 2025.

2025

In January 2025, the LM GT entered 24H Dubai in the GTX class via Graff Racing. The driver line-up included Harrison Newey, Roman Rusinov, Nikita Mazepin and Evgeny Kireev. The car set the fastest qualifying time in its category but during the main race faced engine failure.

In May 2025, Rossa participated in the Ultimate Cup Series. The car also completed private testing at European circuits including Portimão and MotorLand Aragón.

2026

In January 2026, Rossa returned to 24H Dubai under its own UAE-based "Rossa Racing" entry. The driver line-up included Roman Rusinov, Amna Al Qubaisi, Ismail Akhmedkhodjaev, Vyacheslav Gutak, and Evgeny Kireev. The team led the GTX class for around 12 hours before a late-race accident ended the run. The driver exited uninjured.

== See also ==
- List of automobile manufacturers
