= Lamborghini V10 =

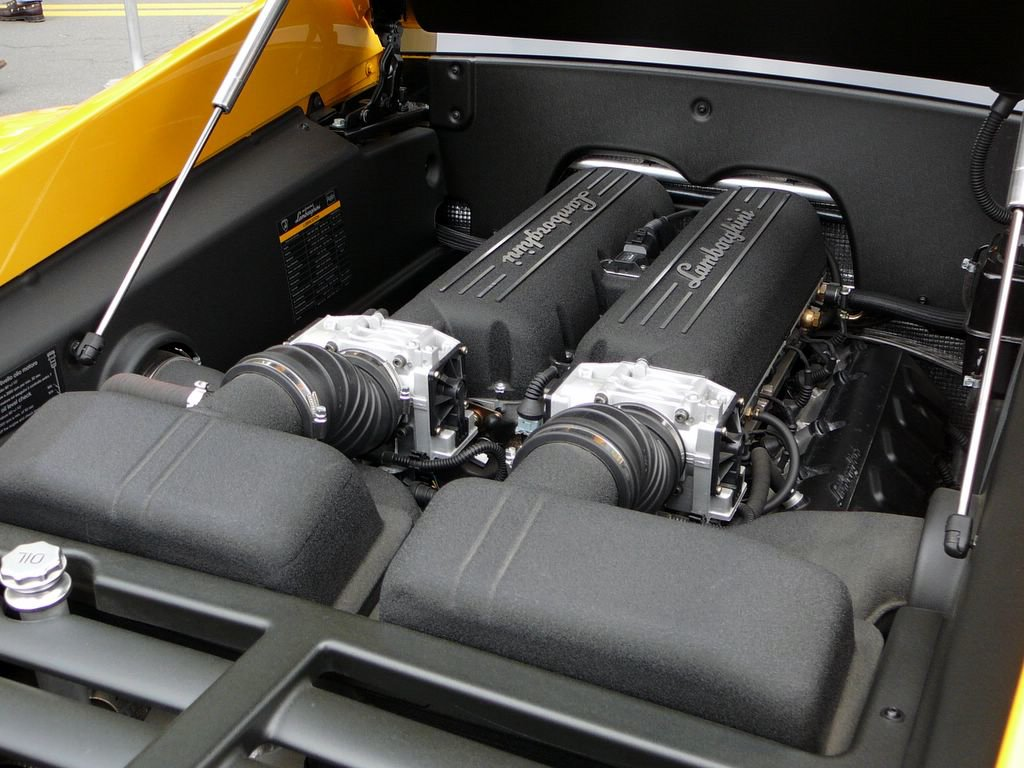
- Lamborghini V10 engine in a Lamborghini Gallardo

Overview
- Manufacturer: Audi & Automobili Lamborghini S.p.A. (Volkswagen Group)
- Production: 2003–2024

Layout
- Configuration: 90° V10 petrol engine
- Displacement: 4,961 cc (302.7 cu in), 5,204 cc (317.6 cu in)
- Cylinder bore: 5.0 L: 82.5 mm (3.25 in), 5.2 L: 84.5 mm (3.33 in)
- Piston stroke: 92.8 mm (3.65 in)
- Cylinder block material: Cast aluminium alloy
- Cylinder head material: Cast aluminium alloy
- Valvetrain: 4-valves per cylinder, double overhead camshaft
- Compression ratio: 5.0 L: 11.5:1; 5.2 L: 12.5:1

Combustion
- Fuel system: 5.0 L: Electronic multi-point sequential fuel injection 5.2 L: Electronic multi-point Fuel Stratified Injection
- Fuel type: Petrol/Gasoline
- Oil system: Dry sump
- Cooling system: Water cooled

Output
- Power output: 5.0 L: 368–390 kW (500–530 PS; 493–523 bhp); 5.2 L: 412–471 kW (560–640 PS; 553–632 bhp) at 8,250 rpm
- Specific power: 5.0 L: 78.6 kW (106.9 PS; 105.4 bhp) per litre 5.2 L: 86.3 kW (117.3 PS; 115.7 bhp) per litre
- Torque output: 5.0 L: 510 N⋅m (376 lbf⋅ft); 5.2 L: 560–601 N⋅m (413–443 lbf⋅ft) at 6,500 rpm

Chronology
- Predecessor: Lamborghini V8 (indirect)
- Successor: Lamborghini L411 (for Temerario)

The Lamborghini V10 is a ninety degree (90°) V10 petrol engine which was developed for the Lamborghini Gallardo automobile, first sold in 2003.

Developed by Lamborghini, for use in the Gallardo, and the first engine developed for Lamborghini after they were acquired by Audi – part of the Volkswagen Group.

This engine has its origins in two concept cars made by Lamborghini, the 1988 P140 and the 1995 Calà. Both were equipped with engines having a 3.9-litre displacement. In the early 2000s, Lamborghini resumed the project and the engine was redesigned by increasing its displacement.

The crankcase and engine block are built at the Audi Hungaria Zrt. factory in Győr, Hungary, whilst final assembly is carried out at Sant'Agata Bolognese, Italy. The engine has a 90° V angle and, unusually for a production engine, a dry sump lubrication system is utilised to keep the center of gravity of the engine low.

There was also some speculation that the engine block of the original 5.0-litre Lamborghini V10 was closely based on the Audi 4.2 FSI V8, which Audi produces for its luxury cars. However, this was denied by Audi, in their official documentation for their 5.2 FSI V10 engine, as used in the Audi S6 and Audi S8 – the Lamborghini 5.0 V10 has a cylinder bore spacing of 88 millimetres (3.46 in) between centres, whereas the Audi 5.2 V10 cylinder bore spacing is 90 millimetres (3.54 in), the same as the Audi 4.2 FSI V8. The cylinder heads use the four valves per cylinder layout favoured by the Italian firm, rather than the five valve per cylinder variation formerly favoured by the German members of Volkswagen Group – including Audi and Volkswagen Passenger Cars. It was later confirmed that the new 5.2-litre Lamborghini V10 is mechanically identical to the Audi 5.2 V10 engine, as is evident by Lamborghini's usage of Audi's Fuel Stratified Injection, and 90 mm cylinder spacing.

== Specifications ==
engine configuration
90° V10 engine; dry sump lubrication system
engine displacement etc.
5.0 — 4,961 cubic centimetres (302.7 cu in); bore x stroke: 82.5 by 92.8 millimetres (3.25 in × 3.65 in). Rod length is 154mm. (Rod/stroke ratio:1.65), 496.1 cc per cylinder; compression ratio: 11.5:1
5.2 — 5,204 cubic centimetres (317.6 cu in); bore x stroke: 84.5 by 92.8 millimetres (3.33 in × 3.65 in). Rod length is 154mm. (Rod/stroke ratio:1.65), 520.4 cc per cylinder; compression ratio: 12.5:1
cylinder block and crankcase
5.0 — cast aluminium alloy with integrated liners with eutectic alloy; 88 mm (3.46 in) cylinder bore spacing; forged steel crankshaft with 18° split crankpins to create even 72° firing intervals
5.2 — cast aluminium alloy; 90 mm cylinder bore spacing; forged steel crankshaft with non-split crankpins creating uneven firing intervals of 90° and 54°
cylinder heads and valvetrain
cast aluminium alloy, four valves per cylinder, 40 valves total, low-friction roller cam followers with automatic hydraulic valve clearance compensation, chain driven double overhead camshafts, continuously variable valve timing system both for intake and exhaust
aspiration
two air filters, two hot-film air mass meters, two cast alloy throttle bodies each with electronically controlled throttle valves, cast magnesium alloy variable geometry and resonance intake manifold
fuel system
5.0 — two linked common rail fuel distributor rails, electronic sequential multi-point indirect fuel injection with 10 intake manifold-sited fuel injectors
5.2 — fully demand-controlled and returnless; fuel tank mounted low pressure fuel pump, Fuel Stratified Injection (FSI): two inlet camshaft double-cam driven single-piston high-pressure injection pumps maintaining pressure in the two stainless steel common rail fuel distributor rails, ten combustion chamber sited direct injection solenoid-controlled sequential fuel injectors
ignition system and engine management
mapped direct ignition with centrally mounted spark plugs and ten individual direct-acting single spark coils; two Lamborghini LIE electronic engine control unit (ECUs) working on the 'master and slave' concept due to the high revving nature of the engine
exhaust system
5.0 — five-into-one exhaust manifolds for each cylinder bank
5.2 — 2-1-2 branch exhaust manifold per cylinder bank to minimise reverse pulsation of expelled exhaust gasses
5.0 power and torque outputs and applications
368 kilowatts (500 PS; 493 bhp) at 7,800 rpm; 510 newton-metres (376 lbf⋅ft) at 4,500 rpm (80% available from 1,500 rpm) — Gallardo 2003-2005
382 kilowatts (519 PS; 512 bhp) at 8,000 rpm; 510 newton-metres (376 lbf⋅ft) at 4,250 rpm — Gallardo SE, Spyder, and 2006-2008
390 kilowatts (530 PS; 523 bhp) at 8,000 rpm; 510 newton-metres (376 lbf⋅ft) at 4,250 rpm — Gallardo Superleggera
5.2 power and torque outputs and applications
224 kilowatts (305 PS; 300 bhp) at 7,000 rpm; 400 newton-metres (295 lbf⋅ft) at 6,500 rpm — Gallardo Super GT - 2008-2009
404.5 kilowatts (550 PS; 542 bhp) at 8,000 rpm; 540 newton-metres (398 lbf⋅ft) at 6,500 rpm — Gallardo LP550/2, Balboni, Spyder, Bicolore, AD Personam, Singapore Limited Edition, Super Trofeo, Tricolore, Hong Kong 20th Anniversary Edition, Malaysia Limited Edition, India Serie Speciale, Indonesia Limited Edition, Edizione Tecnica - 2010-2013
412 kilowatts (560 PS; 553 bhp) at 8,000 rpm; 540 newton-metres (398 lbf⋅ft) at 6,500 rpm — Gallardo LP560/4, LP560/4 Spyder, Polizia, Gold Edition, Bicolore, LP560/4 Noctis, LP560/4 Bianco Rosso, Super Trofeo, LP560/4 GT, Reiter Extenso, Edizione Tecnica, LP560/2 50° Anniversario - 2008-2013
419 kilowatts (570 PS; 562 bhp) at 8,000 rpm; 540 newton-metres (398 lbf⋅ft) at 6,500 rpm — Gallardo LP570/4 SuperLeggera, Spyder Performante, Edizione Tecnica, SuperLeggera Nero Nemesis, SuperLeggera Bianco Canopus, Super Trofeo Stradale, Squadra Corse, Macau GP Edition - 2010-2013
441 kilowatts (600 PS; 591 bhp) at 8,000 rpm; 540 newton-metres (398 lbf⋅ft) at 6,500 rpm — Gallardo GT3
449 kilowatts (610 PS; 602 bhp) at 8,250 rpm; 560 newton-metres (413 lbf⋅ft) at 6,500 rpm — Huracán LP610/4 coupé and spyder - 2014-2019
426.5 kilowatts (580 PS; 572 bhp) at 8,000 rpm; 540 newton-metres (398 lbf⋅ft) at 6,500 rpm — Huracán LP580/2 coupé and spyder - 2016-present
456 kilowatts (620 PS; 612 bhp) at 8,250 rpm; 570 newton-metres (420 lbf⋅ft) at 6,500 rpm — Huracán LP620/2 Super Trofeo, GT3, Super Trofeo Evo - 2014-present
471 kilowatts (640 PS; 632 bhp) at 8,000 rpm; 600 newton-metres (443 lbf⋅ft) at 6,500 rpm — Huracán LP640/4 Performaté coupé and spyder - 2017-present
471 kilowatts (640 PS; 632 bhp) at 8,000 rpm; 600 newton-metres (443 lbf⋅ft) at 6,500 rpm — Huracán LP640/4 Evo coupé and spyder - 2019-present

== Vehicles ==
As of 2019, all V10s in the Lamborghini lineup after the first generation Gallardo use the 5.2-litre variant. They are:

Lamborghini

- Gallardo LP 550-2
- Gallardo LP 550-2 Spyder
- Gallardo LP 560-4
- Gallardo LP 560-4 Spyder
- Gallardo LP 570-4 Superleggera
- Gallardo LP 570-4 Superleggera Edizione Technica
- Gallardo LP 570-4 Spyder Performante Edizone Technica
- Gallardo LP 570-4 Squadra Corse
- Gallardo LP 550-2 Bicolore
- Gallardo LP 550-2 Tricolore
- Gallardo LP 570-4 Super Trofeo Stradale
- Gallardo GT3-R
- Gallardo LP 600 GT3
- Sesto Elemento
- Egoista
- Huracán LP 610-4 Avio
- Huracán LP 580-2
- Huracán LP 580-2 Spyder
- Huracán LP 610-4
- Huracán LP 610-4 Spyder
- Huracán LP 620-2 Super Trofeo
- Huracán GT3
- Huracán GT3 Evo
- Huracán Super Trofeo Evo
- Huracán Super Trofeo Omologata
- Huracán LP 640-4 Performante
- Huracán LP 640-4 Performante Spyder
- Huracán LP 640-4 Evo
- Huracán LP 610-2 Evo RWD
- Huracán LP 640-4 Evo Spyder
- Huracán LP 610-2 Evo RWD Spyder
- Huracán Sterrato
- Huracán Tecnica
- Huracán GT3 Evo
- Asterion LPI 910-4
- Urus Concept

Audi

- R8 V10
- S8 D3
- S6 C6
- RS 6 C6

(The Lamborghini V10 has also had a placement in the Audi R8, RS6, S8 and S6. The 5.2 V10 used in the S6 and S8 is different in several important aspects, namely a less robust crankshaft with a split pin design, cast aluminum pistons, and a traditional wet-sump oiling system, as well as differences in the valvetrain - all of which, combined, result in the much higher RPM red line and specific power output of the Gallardo and R8)

Italdesign

- Zerouno
- Zerouno Duerta

Ares

- Panther ProgettoUno

Rossa

- Rossa LM GT1

== See also ==
- V12 – 6.2/6.5 V12 430-471kW sub-section of the list of Volkswagen Group petrol engines article
- V10 – 5.2 FSI V10 412kW sub-section of the list of Volkswagen Group petrol engines article
