= Kenta Kumagai =

Japanese racing driver

- Nationality: (Japan) Japanese
- Born: 16 September 2005 (age 21) Kanagawa, Japan

Super Formula Lights career
- Debut season: 2026
- Current team: LM corsa
- Car number: 60
- Starts: 15
- Wins: 0
- Podiums: 0
- Poles: 0
- Fastest laps: 0
- Best finish: 11th in 2026

Previous series
- 2024-2026: F4 Japanese Championship
- Statistics up to date as of 18 September 2026.

Kenta Kumagai (熊谷 憲太, Kumagai Kenta; born 16 September 2005) is a Japanese racing driver who is currently competing in the 2026 F4 Japanese Championship and Super Formula Lights with LM corsa.

== Career ==
=== Formula 4 ===
Kumagai made his formula competitive debut in 2024 with OTG Motor Sports. Kumagai continued to stay for another year with the same team, and he ended with a first podium and finished ninth. Kumagai remained with the team for a third season.

=== Super Formula Lights ===
Along with his F4 season, Kumagai stepped up to Super Formula Lights with LM corsa in 2026, where he will replace Reimei Ito.

== Racing record ==
=== Career summary ===
Season	Series	Team	Races	Wins	Poles	FLaps	Podiums	Points	Position
2024	F4 Japanese Championship	OTG Motor Sports	14	0	0	0	0	17	14th
2025	F4 Japanese Championship	OTG Motor Sports	14	0	0	0	1	50.5	9th
2026	Super Formula Lights	LM corsa	15	0	0	1	0	1	11th
2026	F4 Japanese Championship	OTG Motor Sports	14	1	1	2	4	106	4th

* Season still in progress.

=== Complete F4 Japanese Championship results ===
(key) (Races in bold indicate pole position) (Races in italics indicate fastest lap)

Year	Team	1	2	3	4	5	6	7	8	9	10	11	12	13	14	DC	Pts
2024	OTG Motor Sports	FUJ1; 1; 10	FUJ1; 2; 5	SUZ; 1; 18	SUZ; 2; 12	FUJ2; 1; 12	FUJ2; 2; 9	SUG; 1; 15	SUG; 2; 19	AUT; 1; 15	MOT; 1; 12	MOT; 3 Ret	MOT; 3; 12	SUZ2; 1; 12	SUZ2; 2; 8	14th	17
2025	OTG Motor Sports	FUJ1; 1 Ret	FUJ1; 2 Ret	FUJ1; 3; 17	FUJ2; 1; 10	FUJ2; 2; 13	SUZ; 1; 5	SUZ; 2; 5	SUG; 1; 3	SUG; 2; 9	SUG; 3; 5	AUT; 1; 10	AUT; 2; 9	MOT; 1; 12	MOT; 2; 18	9th	50.5
2026	OTG Motor Sports	FUJ1; 1; 2	FUJ1; 2; 4	OKA; 1; 8	OKA; 2; 7	FUJ2; 1 Ret	FUJ2; 2; 6	SUZ; 1; 18	SUZ; 2; 13	SUG; 1	SUG; 2	AUT; 1	AUT; 2	MOT; 1	MOT; 2	5th*	48*

* Season still in progress.

=== Complete Super Formula Lights results ===
(key) (Races in bold indicate pole position) (Races in italics indicate fastest lap)

Year	Entrant	1	2	3	4	5	6	7	8	9	10	11	12	13	14	15	16	17	18	Pos	Points
2026	LM corsa	FUJ; 1; 7	FUJ; 2; 9	FUJ; 3; 9	AUT; 1; 10	AUT; 2; 9	AUT; 3; 10	SUZ; 1; 7	SUZ; 2; 6	SUZ; 3; 7	OKA; 1	OKA; 2	OKA; 3	SUG; 1; 9	SUG; 2; 9	SUG; 3; 9	MOT; 1; 10	MOT; 2; 8	MOT; 3; 10	11th	1
