= Gary Smith (racing driver) =

Canadian racing driver (born 1968)

- Born: July 6, 1968 (age 58); Malahat, British Columbia, Canada
- Achievements: 1997 NASCAR Winston West Series Rookie of the Year

ARCA Menards Series West career
- 44 races run over 6 years
- Best finish: 3rd (1997, 1998)
- First race: 1996 Winston 200 Presented by Alley Chevrolet (Evergreen)
- Last race: 2004 Coors Light 200 (Evergreen)
- First win: 1997 The Exide NASCAR Select Batteries 200 (Tucson)
- Last win: 1998 TCI Digital Cable 200 (Portland)
Wins	Top tens	Poles
3	25	2
- Statistics up to date as of June 8, 2026.

Gary Smith (born July 6, 1968) is a Canadian former stock car racing driver who primarily competed in the NASCAR Winston West Series from 1996 to 2004. He last competed part time in the NASCAR West Series, driving the No. 79 Chevrolet for Midgley Motorsports. Smith is the son of four-time NASCAR Winston West champion Roy Smith.

== Racing Career ==
Smith began kart racing at the age of three, driving for over 18 years and winning four International Kart Federation championships. In 1986, he moved to stock cars, racing at his home track of Western Speedway in Langford, British Columbia. Smith won the 1992 and 1993 IMCA Modified Island Series championship.

In 1995, Smith went full time in the NASCAR Northwest Series, achieving a win at the Wenatchee Valley Super Oval. Smith would go on to finish third in the championship. Returning to the series in 1996, Smith would also make his first NASCAR Winston West Series start on June 29th at Evergreen Speedway, finishing second.

Smith went full time in the Winston West Series in 1997, recording wins at Tucson Speedway and Las Vegas Motor Speedway. Finishing third in the standings, Smith would receive the Rookie of the Year award.

Starting the 1998 season in the No. 09 Pontiac, Smith would drive for Midgley Motorsports. After a crash at California Speedway, he would move to Bill McAnally Racing, scoring a win at Portland Speedway and four runner-up finishes, again finishing third in the championship. Later that year, Smith was selected by NASCAR to compete in the Coca-Cola 500 Winston Cup exhibition race at Twin Ring Motegi in Motegi, Japan, the only Canadian in the field. With backing from Molson Brewery, Smith qualified 27th, retiring on lap 54 with an electrical issue.

Smith moved to Faustina Racing for the first two races of 1999, then competed for Midgley Racing at Phoenix International Raceway and Bernie Hilber Racing at California. After a rough start, including no top-15s and two crashes in the first four races, Smith would miss the next three races before returning to Bernie Hilber Racing, finishing the season 16th in points with a best finish of fifth.

Smith ran the first four races of 2000 with Bernie Hilber Racing in the No. 7 Pontiac, scoring a best finish of 11th at Phoenix. In 2004, Smith drove the No. 79 in the Coors Light 200 at Evergreen Speedway in honor of his late father, Roy, who passed away earlier in the year. He finished eighteenth.

Smith was named president of the Vancouver Island Karting Association in 2021.

== Motorsports results ==
=== NASCAR ===
(key) (Bold – Pole position awarded by qualifying time. Italics – Pole position earned by points standings or practice time. * – Most laps led.)

==== Winston Cup Series ====
NASCAR Winston Cup Series results
Year	Team	No.	Make	1	2	3	4	5	6	7	8	9	10	11	12	13	14	15	16	17	18	19	20	21	22	23	24	25	26	27	28	29	30	31	32	NWCC	Pts	Ref
1997	Gary Smith/John Strauser	45W	Chevy	DAY	CAR	RCH	ATL	DAR	TEX	BRI	MAR	SON; DNQ	TAL	CLT	DOV	POC	MCH	CAL	DAY	NHA	POC	IND	GLN	MCH	BRI	DAR	RCH	NHA	DOV	MAR	CLT	TAL	CAR	PHO	ATL	79th	0	

==== Winston West Series ====
NASCAR Winston West Series results
Year	Team	No.	Make	1	2	3	4	5	6	7	8	9	10	11	12	13	14	15	Pos.	Pts	Ref
1996	Razore Racing	79	Ford	TUS	AMP	MMR	SON	MAD	POR	TUS	EVG; 2	CNS	MAD	MMR	SON	MMR	PHO	LVS	47th	175	
1997	John Strauser	45	Chevy	TUS; 2	AMP; 7	SON; DNQ	**TUS**; 1**	MMR; 3	LVS; 1	CAL; 5	**EVG**; 2*	POR; 2	PPR; 12	AMP; 4	SON; 10	MMR; 3	LVS; 11		3rd	2101	
1998	Midgley Motorsports	09	Pontiac	TUS; 7	LVS; 6	PHO; 3	CAL; 28												3rd	1945	
1998	Bill McAnally Racing	16	Chevy					HPT; 7	MMR; 2	AMP; 2	POR; 1*	CAL; 13	PPR; 31	EVG; 2	SON; 30	MMR; 2	LVS; 17		3rd	1945	
1999	Faustina Racing	6	Chevy	TUS; 27															16th	1302	
1999	Faustina Racing	6	Pontiac		LVS; 17														16th	1302	
1999	Midgley Motorsports	09	Pontiac			PHO; 22													16th	1302	
1999	Bernie Hilber Racing	7	Pontiac				CAL; 32	PPR	MMR	IRW	EVG; 6	POR; 19	IRW; 8	RMR; 5	LVS; 19	MMR; 5	MOT; 14		16th	1302	
2000	Bernie Hilber Racing	7	Pontiac	PHO; 11	MMR; 20	LVS; 27	CAL; 27	LAG	IRW	POR	EVG	IRW	RMR	MMR	IRW				26th	409	
2004	Midgley Motorsports	79	Chevy	PHO	MMR	CAL	S99	EVG; 18	IRW	S99	RMR	DCS	PHO	CNS	MMR	IRW			59th	109	
