= Coca-Cola 500 =

Coca-Cola 500 may refer to the following NASCAR races:

- Coca-Cola 500 (Pocono) (1977–1980), race held at Pocono Raceway, now named The Great American Getaway 400
- Coca-Cola 500 (Atlanta) (1981–1985), race at Atlanta Motor Speedway, now named the Quaker State 400
- Coca-Cola 500 (Motegi), a 1998 exhibition NASCAR stock car race held in Japan

== See also ==
- Coca-Cola 600, the current NASCAR race held at Charlotte Motor Speedway in Concord, North Carolina on Memorial Day
