= NASCAR AutoZone Elite Division =

The NASCAR AutoZone Elite Division refers to multiple regional, amateur/semi-professional short track motor racing series sanctioned by NASCAR until 2006, after which it was discontinued due to dwindling car counts within all series' regional divisions. It may refer to the following series:

- NASCAR AutoZone Elite Division, Midwest Series
- NASCAR AutoZone Elite Division, Northwest Series
- NASCAR AutoZone Elite Division, Southeast Series
- NASCAR AutoZone Elite Division, Southwest Series
