= NASCAR Thunder Special Suzuka =

NASCAR exhibition races

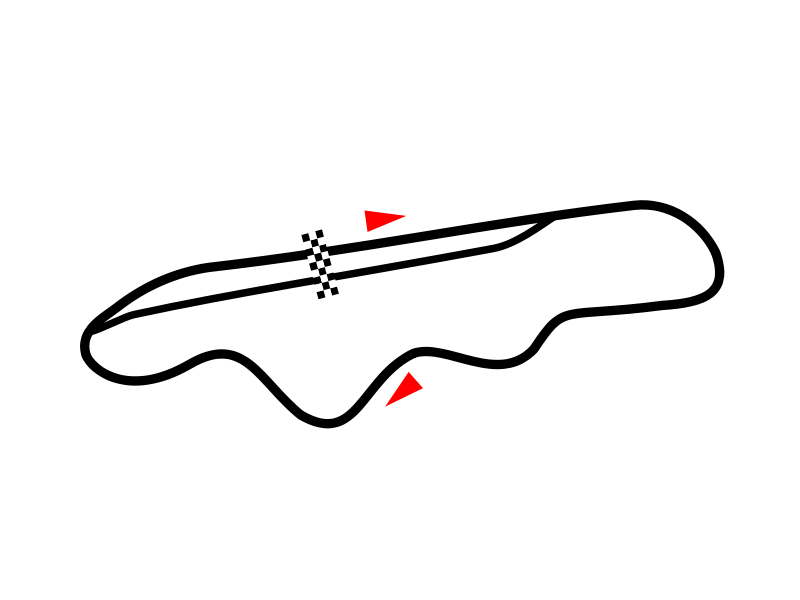

NASCAR Winston Cup Series
- Venue: Suzuka Circuit
- First race: 1996
- Last race: 1997
- Distance: 1996: 139.4 miles (224.3 km); 1997: 174.2 miles (280.3 km)
- Laps: 1996: 100; 1997: 125
- Previous names: NASCAR Suzuka Thunder Special (1996); NASCAR Thunder Special Suzuka (1997)

In 1996 and 1997, NASCAR held non-championship exhibition races on the East portion of the Suzuka Circuit in Suzuka City, Mie Prefecture, Japan. Several Japanese, Australian and Winston West Series drivers participated among some of the Winston Cup Series regulars. The races were broadcast on TBS in the U.S.

In 1995, NASCAR announced a three-year deal for an exhibition race to be hosted on the East Course of the Suzuka Circuit. Pole-sitter Rusty Wallace won the inaugural race in 1996. After winning the race, Wallace ran to the front stretch grandstand to high-five the spectators.

Logistical problems concerning cargo ships containing NASCAR equipment cast doubt over the running of the 1997 race, but the race would be held on schedule. 1997 champion Jeff Gordon missed the race to recover from vocal cord surgery. Rain tires were used for a NASCAR event for the first time in 35 years as Mark Martin won pole position. Rookie of the Year Mike Skinner won the 125-lap race.

The 1998 edition of the race was cancelled and was replaced by an exhibition race at Twin Ring Motegi.

== Race winners ==
Year	Date	No.	Driver	Team	Manufacturer	Race distance		Race time	Average speed (mph)	Pole speed (mph)
Year	Date	No.	Driver	Team	Manufacturer	Laps	Miles (km)	Race time	Average speed (mph)	Pole speed (mph)
1996	November 24	2	Rusty Wallace	Penske Racing	Ford	100	139.4 (224.342)	1:56:25	71.897	83.079
1997	November 23	31	Mike Skinner	Richard Childress Racing	Chevrolet	125	174.25 (280.428)	2:20:22	74.537	80.608
