= Kelly Tanner =

American stock car racing driver (born 1962)

- Nationality: (United States) American
- Born: September 5, 1962 (age 64) Woodinville, Washington, U.S.

NASCAR Raybestos Northwest Series
- Years active: 1987–1999
- Starts: 99
- Wins: 8
- Poles: 16

Championship titles
- 1996, 1997: Reb-Co Northwest Tour

Kelly Tanner (born September 5, 1962) is an American stock car racing driver. Now retired, he competed in the NASCAR Winston West Series, Reb-Co Northwest Tour, and Featherlite Southwest Tour, winning the Northwest Tour championship back to back in 1996 and 1997.

== Career ==
Tanner began his racing career in late models at Evergreen Speedway, before moving up to the Winston Northwest Tour (later Reb-Co Northwest Tour and Raybestos Northwest Series) starting with a partial season in 1987. He ran the full series season starting in 1991; in 1996 and 1997, Tanner won back-to-back series championships. In both years, Tanner completed every lap of every race the series ran, also finishing in the top-ten in every race. Tanner also won the most poles in the series in 1996, with four, and in 1997, winning six pole positions. After the 1997 season Tanner competed in the Winter Heat Series at Tucson Raceway Park, winning the Featherlite Southwest Tour portion of the event.

In 1998, Tanner moved up to compete full-time in the Winston West Series; he posted seven top-ten finishes on the way to seventh in the series standings. Following the year was selected to compete in the Coca-Cola 500 exhibitition race at Twin Ring Motegi in Japan; he finished 29th.

Following the 1999 Winston West season, Tanner retired from his racing career; following his retirement, Tanner worked as a crew chief in Northwest Tour competition; his son, Tyler Tanner, has competed in the NASCAR Camping World Truck Series.

Sporting positions
| Preceded by Ron Eaton | NASCAR Reb-Co Northwest Tour Champion; 1996, 1997 | Succeeded by Gary Lewis |
