= Riona Tomishita =

Japanese racing driver (born 2006)

- Nationality: (Japan) Japanese
- Born: 5 June 2006 (age 20) Chiba Prefecture, Japan

Kyojo Cup career
- Debut season: 2023
- Current team: Cerumo・INGING
- Car number: 39
- Former teams: KTMS
- Starts: 29
- Wins: 3
- Podiums: 9
- Poles: 2
- Fastest laps: 1
- Best finish: 3rd in 2026

Riona Tomishita (富下 李央菜, Tomishita Riona; born 5 June 2006 in Chiba Prefecture) is a Japanese racing driver who last competed for Cerumo・INGING in Kyojo Cup.

== Early career ==
=== Karting ===
Tomishita began karting in 2017, racing in various classes of the Reon Kart GP series, finishing second in Junior Cadet. Returning to the championship for 2018, she won the Frame 60 championship and was runner-up in Junior Cadet to Yuki Sudo. In the following year, Tomishita made her debut in the All-Japan Karting Championship, racing in the FP-Jr division, she scored her first podium at the Mogami River round by finishing second.

In 2021, Tomishita was selected as one of two drivers supported by Yamaha's Formula Blue KT program. She also stepped up to the FP-3 class of the All-Japan Karting Championship, taking a podium on debut at the Motegi round.

In 2022, Tomishita competed in the FP-3 class of the All-Japan Karting Championship, where she fought for the lead of the championship, but eventually ended the season runner-up to Ryunosuke Kasuga in both the main and east region championships.

=== Kyojo Cup ===
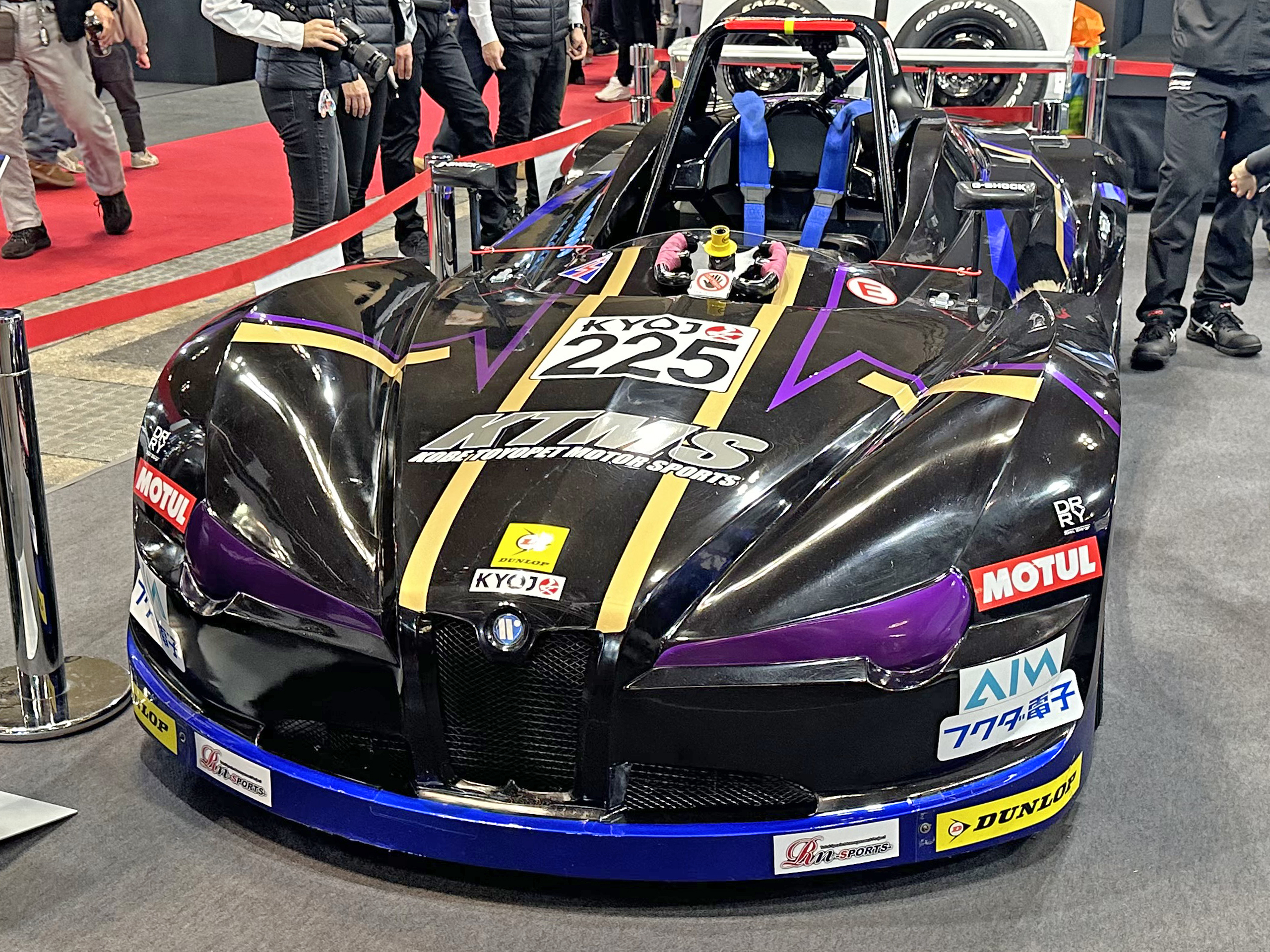
Tomishita's 2023 Kyojo Cup car at the 2024 Osaka Auto Messe

==== 2023 ====
On 5 May 2023, it was announced that Tomishita would step up to Kyojo Cup with Kobe Toyopet's KTMS team. On her debut, Tomishita qualified on pole and ran in the top five in the first half of the race before retiring at the penultimate corner on lap eight. Across the rest of the season Tomishita scored a best result of fifth, in the second round. She finished sixth in the standings in her rookie season.

==== 2024 ====
Tomishita returned to KTMS and Kyojo Cup for 2024. In the second round, Tomishita scored her first points of the season by finishing seventh. In the second race of the only double header round of the season, Tomishita finished fourth, but was promoted to second after Miki Onaga and Rio Shimono were both given post-race penalties. After missing the third round of the season, Tomishita finished fourth on her return, but was promoted to second after race winner Rio Shimono and second-place finisher Mami Sakaue were both disqualified from the race. In the exhibition round held alongside Super Taikyu, Tomishita scored her first Kyojo Cup win in race two. In the final race of the season, Tomishita ran as high as second but dropped to fourth by the end. She finished fifth in the standings on 51 points.

==== 2025 ====
On 25 December 2024, it was announced that Tomishita would join Toyota-supported Cerumo・INGING ahead of her third season in Kyojo Cup. In her first season with Cerumo・INGING, Tomishita scored her maiden podiums by finishing third in both races of round three, before finishing third in the main race of the following round en route to a seventh-place points finish.

==== 2026 ====
Tomishita was retained by Cerumo・INGING for the 2026 season. Tomishita began the season by scoring her first wins of her career in round one, as well as winning the third sprint race of the season en route to third in overall points.

== Other racing ==
During 2025, Tomishita also raced for KTMS in the ST-2 class of the Super Taikyu Series alongside Tokiya Suzuki and Hibiki Taira. Winning on debut at Motegi, Tomishita then scored further wins at Autopolis and Okayama as well as two more podiums to end the year runner-up in the ST-2 class. The following year, Tomishita returned to KTMS for her sophomore season in Super Taikyu's ST-2 class, alongside Kiyoshi Umegaki and Rin Arakawa. During 2026, Tomishita made a cameo appearance in the F4 Japanese Championship for TGR-DC Racing School at Sportsland Sugo.

== Karting record ==
=== Karting career summary ===
Season	Series	Team	Position
2017	Reon Kids Kart GP – Beginner		4th
2017	Reon Kids Kart GP – Frame-60		4th
2017	Reon Kids Kart GP – Jr-C		2nd
2018	Reon Kids Kart GP – Frame 60		1st
2018	Reon Kids Kart GP – Jr-C		2nd
2018	Twin Ring Motegi Kart Race – Yamaha Cadet Open		14th
2018	Twin Ring Motegi Kart Race – SS Junior Open		14th
2018	Mobara Twin Circuit Kart Race – Yamaha SS	Reon Kids	13th
2018	Motegi Kart Endurance Festival "K-TAI"	Corolla Shin-Ibaraki REON KIDS 3	3rd
2019	Twin Ring Motegi Kart Race – Yamaha SS		9th
2019	Mobara Twin Circuit Kart Race – Yamaha SS	Corolla Shin-Ibaraki Reon Kids Racing	8th
2019	Suzuka Circuit Kart Race – Yamaha SS		NC
2019	All-Japan Junior Karting Championship – FP-Jr		14th
2019	Junior Kart East Region Championship – FP-Jr		6th
2019	Motegi Kart Endurance Festival "K-TAI"	Corolla Shin-Ibaraki REON KIDS 3	7th
2020	Twin Ring Motegi KT Super Trophy – Yamaha SS	Corolla Shin-Ibaraki REON KIDS	8th
2020	Twin Ring Motegi Kart Race – Yamaha SS		11th
2020	Suzuka Circuit Kart Race – Yamaha SS		NC
2020	All-Japan Junior Karting Championship – FP-3		7th
2020	Junior Kart East Region Championship – FP-3		3rd
2021	KT Super Trophy Motegi – Yamaha SS	Team TKC	9th
2021	Sugo Kart Race – Yamaha SS	Team TKC	13th
2021	KT Summer Festival Sugo – Yamaha SS	Team TKC	13th
2021	45th SL Kart Meeting National Championship – Yamaha SS	Team TKC	4th
2021	New Tokyo Circuit Winter Cup – FP-3		10th
2021	All-Japan Karting Championship – FP-3		13th
2021	All-Japan Karting East Region Championship – FP-3		6th
2021	Motegi Kart Series – Yamaha SS		3rd
2022	APG Winter Cup – Yamaha SS		2nd
2022	All-Japan Karting Championship – FP-3	Formula Blue TKC	2nd
2022	All-Japan East Region Karting Championship – FP-3	Formula Blue TKC	2nd
2022	Motegi Kart Series – Yamaha SS	Team TKC	2nd
2022	All-Japan Karting Championship – EV	Team TKC	NC
2022	Motegi Kart Race – Yamaha SS	Team TKC	2nd
2022	SL Kart Meeting SUGO Kart Race Series – Yamaha SS	Team TKC	3rd
2023	All-Japan Karting Championship – EV	Yamaha Formula Blue	3rd

== Racing record ==
=== Racing career summary ===
Season	Series	Team	Races	Wins	Poles	F/Laps	Podiums	Points	Position
2023	Kyojo Cup	KTMS	4	0	1	0	0	23	6th
2024	Kyojo Cup	KTMS	5	0	0	0	2	51	5th
2024	FCR-VITA	KTMS	1	0	0	0	0	2	27th
2025	Kyojo Cup	Team Optimus Cerumo・INGING	10	0	0	0	3	36	7th
2025	Super Taikyū – ST-2	KTMS	6	3	0	0	5	118‡	**2nd‡**
2026	Kyojo Cup	Team Optimus Cerumo・INGING	10	3	2	2	4	88	**3rd**
2026	Super Taikyū – ST-2	KTMS							
2026	TGR GR86/BRZ Cup	KTMS							
2026	F4 Japanese Championship	TGR-DC Racing School	2	0	0	0	0	0	29th

‡ Team standings

=== Complete Kyojo Cup results ===
(key) (Races in bold indicate pole position) (Races in italics indicate fastest lap)

Year	Entrant	1	2	3	4	5	6	7	8	9	10	Pos	Points
2023	KTMS	**FUJ1**; Ret	FUJ2; 5	FUJ3; 7	FUJ4; 6							6th	23
2024	KTMS	FUJ1; 9	FUJ2; 1; 7	FUJ2; 2; 2	FUJ3	FUJ4; 2	NC; 1; 2	NC; 2; 1	FUJ5; 4			5th	51
2025	Team Optimus Cerumo・INGING	FUJ1; SPR; 9	FUJ1; FIN; 11	FUJ2; SPR; 7	FUJ2; FIN; 5	FUJ3; SPR; 3	FUJ3; FIN; 3	FUJ4; SPR; 9	FUJ4; FIN; 3	FUJ5; SPR; Ret	FUJ5; FIN; 12	7th	36
2026	Team Optimus Cerumo・INGING	**FUJ1**; **SPR**; 1	FUJ1; FIN; 1	FUJ2; SPR; 13	FUJ2; FIN; 5	**FUJ3**; **SPR**; 1^{1}	FUJ3; FIN; 2	FUJ4; SPR; 6	FUJ4; FIN; 6	FUJ5; SPR; 4	FUJ5; FIN; 4	3rd	88

=== Complete F4 Japanese Championship results ===
(key) (Races in bold indicate pole position) (Races in italics indicate fastest lap)

Year	Team	1	2	3	4	5	6	7	8	9	10	11	12	13	14	DC	Pts
2026	TGR-DC Racing School	FUJ1; 1	FUJ1; 2	OKA; 1	OKA; 2	FUJ2; 1	FUJ2; 2	SUZ; 1	SUZ; 2	SUG; 1; 13	SUG; 2; 24	AUT; 1	AUT; 2	MOT; 1	MOT; 2	29th	0
