= TBS (American TV channel) =

American basic cable television channel

- Logo used since 2020
- Type: Basic cable network
- Country: United States
- Broadcast area: United States
- Headquarters: Ted Turner Campus, 1050 Techwood Drive, Atlanta, Georgia, U.S.

Programming
- Languages: English; Spanish (with SAP audio track)
- Picture format: 1080i (HDTV); (downscaled to letterboxed 480i for the SDTV feed)

Ownership
- Owner: Warner Bros. Discovery (2022–2026); Skydance (2026–present)
- Parent: Skydance Global Cable Media
- Sister channels: list of assets owned by Skydance

History
- Launched: December 17, 1976; 49 years ago
- Founder: Ted Turner
- Former names: WTCG-TV (1976–1979); SuperStation WTBS (1979–1987); SuperStation TBS (1987–1989); TBS Superstation (1989–1991, 1996–2004)

Links
- Website: tbs.com

Availability

Streaming media
- Affiliated Streaming Service: HBO Max
- Service(s): DirecTV Stream, Hulu + Live TV, Sling TV, YouTube TV

TBS (originally an initialism of Turner Broadcasting System) is an American basic cable television network owned by Skydance Global Cable Media, a division of Skydance. It carries a variety of programming, with a focus on comedy, along with some sports events through TNT Sports, including Major League Baseball, Stanley Cup playoffs and the NCAA men's basketball tournament. As of September 2018, TBS was received by approximately 90.391 million households that subscribe to a pay television service throughout the United States. By June 2023, this number has dropped to 71.3 million households. TBS' sister networks are TNT, TruTV and Turner Classic Movies with the first two channels also providing sports coverage through TNT Sports.

TBS was originally established on December 17, 1976, as the national feed of Turner's Atlanta, Georgia, independent television station, WTCG. The decision to begin offering WTCG via satellite transmission to cable and satellite subscribers throughout the United States expanded the small station into the first nationally distributed "superstation". With the assignment of WTBS as the broadcast station's call sign in 1979, the national feed became known as SuperStation WTBS, and later SuperStation TBS, TBS Superstation, or simply TBS. The channel broadcast a variety of programming during this era, including films, syndicated series, and sports (including Atlanta Braves baseball, basketball games involving the Atlanta Hawks and other NBA teams, and professional wrestling including Georgia Championship Wrestling, Jim Crockett Promotions, World Championship Wrestling and All Elite Wrestling).

WTBS maintained a nearly identical program schedule as the national feed, aside from local commercials, FCC-mandated EAS alerts, legal IDs, public affairs and educational programming that only aired on the local signal. By the early 2000s, TBS had begun to focus more intensively on comedic programming, including sitcoms and other series. On October 1, 2007, TBS was converted by Turner into a conventional basic cable network, at which time it began to be carried within the Atlanta market on area cable providers alongside its existing local carriage on satellite providers DirecTV and Dish Network. The former parent station in Atlanta was concurrently relaunched as WPCH-TV (branded as "Peachtree TV", which Turner sold to the Meredith Corporation in 2017, and later acquired by Gray Media in 2021) and reformatted as a traditional independent station with a separate schedule exclusively catering to the Atlanta market.

== History ==
TBS originated as a terrestrial television station in Atlanta, Georgia, that began operating on UHF channel 17 on September 1, 1967, under the WJRJ-TV call letters. In 1996, it was acquired by Time Warner, and in 2003, began to focus on comedic programming.

== Programming ==
As of September 2026, TBS currently airs a mix of game shows, reality shows and reruns of live-action sitcoms originally broadcast on the major broadcast networks. The daytime schedule is heavily dominated by reruns of current and former network comedies, which also air in the evening and sporadically during the overnight. As of 2026, these programs consist of Family Matters, Friends, The Big Bang Theory, Young Sheldon, and The Office. Most reruns shown on TBS are broadcast in a compressed format, with content sped up to accommodate additional time slots for advertising sales.

Since December 2004, TBS has broadcast a 24-hour marathon of A Christmas Story from Christmas Eve evening to Christmas Day evening; TNT has also run annual marathons of the film (airing concurrently with TBS but usually delayed by one hour) since 2014. Since November 2004, TBS has run special prime time airings of The Wizard Of Oz in multiple showings around Thanksgiving each year.

=== Sports programming ===
==== Baseball ====
Coverage of the Atlanta Braves Major League Baseball team—which was formerly owned by Ted Turner from 1976 until the 1996 acquisition of Turner Broadcasting by Time Warner—was perhaps TBS's signature program, mainly due to its viewer popularity in Georgia and neighboring states. Turner acquired the local television rights to the Braves for WTCG in July 1972, effective with the team's 1973 season, assuming the contract from then-NBC affiliate WSB-TV, which had carried the franchise's games since the Braves relocated from Milwaukee in 1966. Turner's contractual agreement with the team reversed the standard of MLB franchises designating originating stations, arranging their own regional carrier networks and handling advertising sales for their game telecasts. It was also particularly striking given that WTCG had experienced major profit losses ever since Ted Turner assumed ownership of the station from Rice Broadcasting in 1970; WTCG had only then started to break even in revenue and was just beginning to become more competitive with the Atlanta market's other television stations in terms of viewership.

Channel 17's Braves telecasts began airing nationally at the start of the 1977 season, after Turner and Southern Satellite Systems uplinked the station's signal via satellite. As WTCG reached a significant cable penetration rate throughout the Southern U.S. during 1978 and 1979, Turner ceased syndicating the team's game broadcasts and relegated those telecasts to the WTCG/WTBS cable feed, making the Braves the first team that did not provide live game coverage to broadcast stations outside of those within the team's home market. Turner once famously tried to get Andy Messersmith to use his #17 jersey to promote Superstation WTBS in its early years (the back of the jersey read, "CHANNEL 17"). The MLB organization immediately stopped Turner from proceeding with this plan due to league regulations barring team jerseys from incorporating advertising other than that of the jersey's manufacturer.

WTBS's broadcasts of Braves games helped expand the team's fanbase well outside of the Southern United States and earned them national prominence as "America's Team", even as the franchise's performance ranged from amiable to poor for much of the late 1970s and the 1980s. Some sportswriters even posited how such an awful team could have such broad availability via cable television, as with a 1990 Los Angeles Times column in which sportswriter Mike Downey jocularly lamented that TBS was short for "These Braves Stink." (During the aforementioned period, the team's only postseason appearance was in 1982 and only three seasons, 1980, 1982, and 1983, had the Braves achieve a scoring average above .500.)

At the 2006 MLB All-Star Game, it was announced that TBS would begin carrying a television package that includes all major league teams beginning with the 2007 season. TBS began carrying all Division Series games and one of the two League Championship Series (assuming the rights from Fox and ESPN) as well as the announcements of the All-Star teams and any possible games to determine division winners and wild card teams (those were also carried previously on ESPN). In 2008, TBS began airing MLB regular season Sunday games, with the provision that no team may appear on the telecasts more than 13 times during the season.

During the 2007 transitional year, TBS aired 70 regular-season Braves games. In 2008, the number of Braves telecasts was reduced to only 45 games, with TBS's former Atlanta feed, WPCH-TV solely carrying the telecasts; Turner syndicated the package to other television stations and local origination cable channels for broadcast in the remainder of the Braves' designated market area. The final Braves game to be broadcast on TBS aired on September 30, 2007, with the first divisional playoff game airing the following day on October 1, 2007 (when the TBS/WPCH split occurred).

On October 18, 2008, a technical problem at the channel's master control facility in Atlanta prevented TBS from showing the first inning of Game 6 of the American League Championship Series between the Boston Red Sox and Tampa Bay Rays; the channel aired a rerun episode of The Steve Harvey Show instead.

==== National Basketball Association ====
In October 1972, WTCG obtained the broadcast rights to broadcast NBA games involving the Atlanta Hawks (which was also owned by Ted Turner at the time) under a ten-year agreement. WTCG/WTBS and its superstation feed aired an average of 55 Hawks regular season games per season. TBS aired the games nationwide until the telecasts became subjected to NBA blackout restrictions within 35 miles (56 km) of the home team's arena, resulting in many Hawks away games televised by the TBS national feed being unavailable to cable providers within the designated market area of the opposing team. (This restriction was dropped when TNT gained the right to be the exclusive broadcaster of any game that it chose to carry, although it was still subjected to league restrictions first imposed in 1982 that limited the number of games that could air per season on national and regional superstations.)

In the spring of 1984, WTBS reached an agreement with the NBA to broadcast games from league teams other than the Hawks beginning with the 1984–85 season; under the deal, WTBS/TBS maintained a package of approximately 55 regular season NBA games annually, with games airing on Tuesday and Friday nights. From 1985 until 1989, WTBS/TBS also televised anywhere from 12 to 20 early round conference playoff games beginning with the 1985 NBA Playoffs as well as the NBA draft. Under a joint broadcast contract signed between Turner Broadcasting and the NBA in the summer of 1987, the rights to NBA telecasts began to be split between TBS and upstart sister network TNT beginning with the league's 1988-89 season, with TNT assuming rights to the NBA Draft and most NBA regular season and playoff games and TBS's NBA telecasts being relegated to a single game or a double-headers one night per week. In 2001, Turner Sports signed a new television contract with the NBA, in which TNT would become Turner Broadcasting's exclusive rightsholder of NBA telecasts beginning with the 2002–03 season. (ESPN assumed TBS's portion of the league's pay television contract, though TBS maintained the right to air NBA on TNT games which have had overflow feeds until NBA TV assumed those rights later on.)

==== Professional wrestling ====
Professional wrestling aired on WTCG/WTBS from 1971 to 2001 under several different wrestling promotions. In 1971, the station served as the flagship outlet for the Jim Barnett-owned Georgia Championship Wrestling (GCW), acquiring the local rights to the program from WQXI-TV (now WXIA); the program concurrently began to be recorded in a soundstage at the channel 17's now-former West Peachtree Street studios in Midtown Atlanta. When WTBS became a national superstation in 1976, Georgia Championship Wrestling became the first National Wrestling Alliance (NWA) promotion to maintain a nationally televised broadcast, a move which made many of the NWA's regional promoters unhappy; however, Barnett allayed any issues citing that he was only using Georgia-based wrestlers.

In July 1984, GCW and the promotion's television timeslot rights were acquired by the Vince McMahon-owned World Wrestling Federation (WWF; now the WWE). The replacement show, WWF World Championship Wrestling (later retitled WWF Georgia Championship Wrestling in March 1985), mainly served as a recap of matches that had previously aired on the WWF's main programs, which angered Ted Turner, who hoped that the WWF would hold first-run matches originating from the WTBS studios. The WWF iteration of the show received much lower viewership than its predecessor; this led McMahon to sell the promotion's Saturday night time slot to Jim Crockett Promotions (owned by Charlotte-based wrestling promoter Jim Crockett, Jr.), who assumed production responsibilities for the wrestling program and utilized the same set.

In 1985, Turner acquired the television rights to Mid-South Wrestling (owned by Shreveport-based promoter Bill Watts) as a WWF alternative program. Although Mid-South quickly became the highest-rated program on WTBS, Watts lost out on acquiring the two-hour Saturday timeslot occupied by the WWF, when Barnett helped broker a deal that allowed Crockett to buy the slot from McMahon and become the superstation's exclusive wrestling promotion. Through the early 1990s, the wrestling programs and Braves baseball were among pay television's highest-rated offerings, due to heavy viewership in the Southeast.

In November 1988, TBS became the television home of World Championship Wrestling (WCW), which Turner acquired from Jim Crockett Promotions; from 1992 to 2000, it carried the weekly show, WCW Saturday Night, which served as the WCW's flagship program prior to the launch of Monday Nitro on sister channel TNT in 1995. Another WCW show, WCW Thunder, debuted in 1998 on Thursday nights; the program was moved to Wednesdays in 2000, before it was cancelled in 2001 when TBS executive Jamie Kellner determined that wrestling did not fit the demographics of either TBS or TNT and would not be favorable enough to get the "right" advertisers to buy airtime—even though Thunder was the highest-rated show on TBS at the time. In the book NITRO: The Incredible Rise and Inevitable Collapse of Ted Turner's WCW by Guy Evans, it is said that a key condition in WCW's purchase deal with Fusient Media Ventures was that Fusient wanted control over time slots on TNT and TBS networks, regardless of whether these slots would show WCW programming or not. This influenced Kellner's decision to ultimately cancel WCW programming.

On May 19, 2021, WarnerMedia announced that All Elite Wrestling's (AEW) flagship show, AEW Dynamite, would be moving from TNT to TBS in January 2022, marking the first time in over 20 years that TBS would air professional wrestling programming since airing the last episode of WCW Thunder on March 21, 2001. It was later announced that the show would start airing on TBS on January 5, 2022. It was also originally reported that AEW's secondary show, AEW Rampage, would be moving to TBS as well. However, it was later reported that Rampage would stay on TNT.

==== College basketball ====
In 2011, TBS obtained the television rights to the NCAA Men's Division I Basketball Championship, with broadcast rights shared with CBS, and fellow Turner properties TNT and TruTV. TBS and the other two Turner-owned networks presently broadcast games played in the second and third rounds of the tournament, with TBS alternating coverage with CBS for the regional semifinals (Sweet Sixteen). In 2014 and 2015, TBS and CBS split coverage of the Regional Finals (Elite Eight), with TBS gaining the two Saturday evening games and CBS retaining the two Sunday afternoon games. Also in 2014 and 2015, TBS covered the national semifinals (Final Four). In 2016, TBS televised the Final Four and the national championship game, beginning an alternating agreement with CBS through 2032. In even-numbered years, TBS now broadcasts the final three games, and in odd-numbered years, CBS televises the games.

==== College football ====
In 1981, WTBS acquired the cable television rights to broadcast college football games under a special "supplemental" television contract with the National Collegiate Athletic Association (NCAA) beginning with the 1981 season, limited to games which had already not been distributed for national broadcast by other networks. Beginning with the 1982 season, under a $17.6-million deal reached between the NCAA and Turner on January 27 of that year, consisting of live Division I-AA games on Thursday nights and Division I-A games on Saturdays during the fall. With this, its national superstation feed became the first cable channel to broadcast live college football games nationwide. Beginning in 1984, WTBS's college football coverage shifted to primarily focus on games involving teams in the Southeastern Conference (SEC). WTBS/TBS discontinued its college football contract after the 1992 season.

WTBS/TBS resumed college football coverage in 2002 through a sub-licensing agreement with Fox Sports, which allowed the Atlanta station and superstation feed to carry college football games involving teams in the Big 12 and Pac-10 conferences, to which Fox Sports held the national cable television rights, the network usually aired two games per week during the first four seasons of the contract, reduced to a single weekly game during some weeks in the 2006 season. These rights were transferred exclusively to Fox Sports and its regional sports networks beginning with the 2007 season.

Beginning with the 2024–25 season TBS simulcast TNT’s coverage of college football playoffs' first round games.

==== NASCAR ====
TBS first began carrying NASCAR Winston Cup in 1983, when it acquired the rights to the Winston Western 500 (which was carried annually until 1987). It also broadcast the Richmond 400 spring race (later renamed the Miller High Life 400 and then the Pontiac Excitement 400) from 1983 to 1995, the Atlanta Journal 500 from 1983 to 1985, and the Nationwise 500 (later renamed the AC Delco 500) from 1985 to 1987.

For most of the 1990s, the only Winston Cup Series races aired on TBS were the two races held at Lowe's Motor Speedway (Coca-Cola 600 from 1988 to 2000, UAW-GM Quality 500 from 1989 to 2000) as well as the Miller Genuine Draft 500 (later the Miller 500 and then the Pennsylvania 500) each July from 1993 to 2000. (TBS did not have rights to The Winston, which usually aired on TNN). TBS was also the home of the post-season exhibition races held at Suzuka Circuit and Twin Ring Motegi in Japan from 1996 to 1998. Select Winston Cup, Busch Series and Craftsman Truck Series races aired on TBS until the 2000 season. NASCAR events moved to TNT in 2001 as part of a deal between the organization, NBC and TNT, although the initial plans were for TBS to carry the races. Instead, Turner Broadcasting decided that the NASCAR telecasts would better fit TNT's "We Know Drama" image campaign.

==== Beach volleyball ====
As part of a multi-year deal with Turner Sports, the NCAA Beach Volleyball Championship was televised by TBS in 2016 and 2017.

==== National Hockey League ====
WTCG carried coverage of the National Hockey League (NHL)'s Atlanta Flames from 1977 to 1980, when the team moved to Calgary.

On April 27, 2021, Turner Sports agreed to a seven-year deal for rights to the NHL. While most regular season games air on TNT, select playoff games are broadcast on TBS instead.

==== Esports ====
On September 23, 2015, Turner Broadcasting announced that plans to launch a Counter-Strike: Global Offensive esports league beginning in 2016. Other video games would be added in future seasons, ranging from FIFA to numerous fighting games. ELEAGUE has been dormant since 2020, mainly due to the COVID-19 pandemic.

In 2024, TBS began airing The Road to a Madden Millionaire, a documentary series on professional Madden NFL Football esports player Henry Leverette.
