= Ryo Shirasaki =

Japanese racing driver (born 1998)

Ryō Shirasaki
- Nationality: (Japan) Japanese
- Born: 11 June 1998 (age 28) Okegawa, Saitama, Japan

Previous series
- 2024–26 2021–23: F4 Japanese Championship; Super FJ

Championship titles
- 2026 2023: F4 Japanese Championship; Super-FJ Suzuka/Okayama Series

Ryō Shirasaki (白崎稜, Shirasaki Ryō; born 11 June 1998) is a Japanese racing driver who currently competes in the F4 Japanese Championship for HYDRANGEA Kageyama Racing. He is the reigning F4 Japanese Championship Drivers' Champion, having won the title in 2026.

== Early and personal life ==
Born in Okegawa in Saitama Prefecture and raised in nearby Ageo, Shirasaki began kart racing at the age of nine after driving at the Quick Hanyū rental karting circuit. He competed sporadically in karting over the next five years, finishing second to Kazuto Kotaka in the FP-Junior Cadet class of the JAF Tōkai Unified Junior Karting Series in 2009 before being forced to end his racing career due to an injury. Shirasaki would not race competitively in any category for the next nine years, and as of 2025, he continues to work full-time as an office worker even after his return to motorsport.

== Racing career ==
=== Super-FJ ===
After graduating from high school and enrolling at the Shibaura Institute of Technology, Shirasaki joined his university's Formula SAE team as an engineer and reignited his passion for motorsports. As the COVID-19 pandemic struck around the time of his graduation from university, Shirasaki opted to continue graduate studies at Shibaura while committing to a return to the racing industry. After winning an open driver audition held by the Zap Speed racing team, Shirasaki formally made his on-track return in December 2021, competing for Zap Speed in the Super FJ series' year-ending All-Japan Final.

Shirasaki continued in Super FJ for the following year, contesting the full season of the Tsukuba/Fuji regional championship. He finished second in the championship after being consistently behind eventual champion Sōryū Tagami over the course of the season, but claimed his first pole position and victory in car racing at the final round.

Shirasaki remained in Super FJ for 2023, but switched to the Suzuka/Okayama regional championship with the Kodaira-based TAKE FIRST team. He easily claimed the title as one of three full-season participants (but was frequently challenged by part-time entries such as Taichi Watarai and Daichi Okamoto) and later finished runner-up in the All-Japan Final race in December.

=== Formula 4 ===
Shirasaki stepped up to the national F4 Japanese Championship for 2024, driving for Shinichi Takagi's Bionic Jack Racing team. Despite frequently running within points-paying positions, Shirasaki had a relatively quiet season results-wise, with a best qualifying result of fourth and a best race result of fifth.

The following year, Shirasaki moved to compete for Masami Kageyama's eponymous HYDRANGEA Kageyama Racing Team alongside Itsuki Sato. He showed immediate pace from the off, scoring two pole positions and a second-placed grid spot in the first weekend's qualifying session at Fuji and scored his first race victory in the category in the second round. Shirasaki would go on to claim two more race victories towards the season's end to finish third behind Sato and eventual champion Tokiya Suzuki, but his and Sato's efforts would give Kageyama Racing their first-ever Teams' Championship.

Shirasaki continued with Kageyama for the 2026 season, enduring a difficult opening weekend where he was penalized in the first race and rear-ended by Ryōki Minoura in the second before going on to dominate the next six races at Okayama, Fuji, and Suzuka with six consecutive pole-to-win performances. His mid-season domination proved enough for him to seal the championship title at the series' penultimate round in Autopolis. With this historic result, Shirasaki became the first driver in Japanese F4's history to win the drivers' championship without support from the Honda or Toyota driver development programmes, as well as the first driver to win any Japanese national single-seater racing series outright since Yūji Ide (then in his fifth consecutive season of national-level competition) won the Formula Dream championship in 1998.

== Racing record ==
=== Career summary ===
| Season | Series | Team | Races | Wins | Poles | FLaps | Podiums | Points | Position |
|---|---|---|---|---|---|---|---|---|---|
| 2021 | Super-FJ – All-Japan Final | Zap Speed | 1 | 0 | 0 | 0 | 0 | N/A | 16th |
| 2022 | Super-FJ Tsukuba/Fuji Series | Zap Speed | 8 | 1 | 1 | 1 | 4 | 94 | **2nd** |
| 2022 | Super-FJ – All-Japan Final | Zap Speed | 1 | 0 | 0 | 0 | 0 | N/A | 9th |
| 2023 | Super-FJ Suzuka/Okayama Series | TAKE FIRST | 8 | 2 | 3 | 4 | 4 | 97 | **1st** |
| 2023 | Super-FJ Motegi/SUGO Series | TAKE FIRST | 1 | 0 | 0 | 0 | 1 | N/A | NC |
| 2023 | Super-FJ – All-Japan Final | TAKEFIRST & QUICK Hanyū | 1 | 0 | 0 | 0 | 1 | N/A | **2nd** |
| 2024 | F4 Japanese Championship | Bionic Jack Racing | 14 | 0 | 0 | 0 | 0 | 27 | 13th |
| 2025 | F4 Japanese Championship | HYDRANGEA Kageyama Racing | 14 | 3 | 2 | 2 | 7 | 168.5 | **3rd** |
| 2025 | Minutes Endurance Challenge – v.Granz Am | E-NEEDS RACING | 1 | 1 | 1 | 1 | 1 | 23‡ | 6th‡ |
| 2025 | Minutes Endurance Challenge – v.Granz Pro-Am | E-NEEDS RACING | 1 | 0 | 0 | 0 | 0 | 0‡ | NC‡ |
| 2025 | Autopolis 3 Hour VITA Endurance | E-NEEDS RACING | 1 | 1 | 0 | 1 | 1 | N/A | **1st** |
| 2026 | F4 Japanese Championship | HYDRANGEA Kageyama Racing | 14 | 8 | 6 | 4 | 10 | 244 | **1st** |

=== Complete F4 Japanese Championship results ===
(key) (Races in bold indicate pole position) (Races in italics indicate fastest lap)

| Year | Team | 1 | 2 | 3 | 4 | 5 | 6 | 7 | 8 | 9 | 10 | 11 | 12 | 13 | 14 | DC | Pts |
|---|---|---|---|---|---|---|---|---|---|---|---|---|---|---|---|---|---|
| 2024 | Bionic Jack Racing | FUJ1; 1; 6 | FUJ1; 2 Ret | SUZ; 1; 13 | SUZ; 2; 21 | FUJ2; 1; 8 | FUJ2; 2; 12 | SUG; 1; 14 | SUG; 2; 18 | AUT; 12 | MOT; 1; 5 | MOT; 2; 15 | MOT; 3; 10 | SUZ2; 1; 8 | SUZ2; 2 Ret | 13th | 27 |
| 2025 | HYDRANGEA Kageyama Racing | **FUJ1**; **1**; 8 | **FUJ1**; **2**; 1 | FUJ1; 3; 23 | FUJ2; 1; 3 | FUJ2; 2; 3 | SUZ2; 1; 7 | SUZ2; 2; 10 | SUG; 1; 4 | SUG; 2; 3 | SUG; 3; 3 | AUT; 1; 4 | AUT; 2; 1 | MOT; 1; 7 | MOT; 2; 1 | 3rd | 168.5 |
| 2026 | HYDRANGEA Kageyama Racing | FUJ1; 1; 19 | FUJ1; 2 Ret | **OKA**; **1**; 1 | **OKA**; **2**; 1 | **FUJ2**; **1**; 1 | **FUJ2**; **2**; 1 | **SUZ**; **1**; 1 | **SUZ**; **2**; 1 | SUG; 1; 12 | SUG; 2; 2 | AUT; 1; 6 | AUT; 2; 2 | MOT; 1 | MOT; 2 | 1st | 194* |

* Season still in progress.
