= 2026 F4 Japanese Championship =

Formula 4 championship

The 2026 seven x seven FIA F4 Japanese Championship season was the twelfth season of the F4 Japanese Championship.

This was the third season for the second-generation MCSC-24 chassis constructed by Toray Carbon Magic, and TOM'S TMA43 engine which produced 180 horsepower.

== Teams and drivers ==
All teams competed with an identical Toray Carbon Magic MCSC-24 chassis and TOM'S 2-litre naturally aspirated engine.

=== Champion Class ===
Team	No.	Driver	Rounds
Ragno Motor Sports	2	(Japan) Keigo Okazawa	1–2
Team 5ZIGEN	3	(Japan) Sena Yamamoto	1–4
Buzz Racing	6	(Japan) Douglas Bolger	6
Buzz Racing	7	(Japan) Toranosuke Takagi	All
Buzz Racing	8	(South Korea) Song Harim	1–2
Buzz Racing	8	(New Zealand) William Beck	3, 5–7
Zap Speed	14	(Japan) Masaki Murata	1–5, 7
Zap Speed	24	(Japan) Kota Umemoto	1–5
Zap Speed	24	(Japan) Hiroto Suzuki	7
HYDRANGEA Kageyama Racing	15	(Japan) Ryusho Nakazato	All
HYDRANGEA Kageyama Racing	16	(Japan) Ryo Shirasaki	All
HYDRANGEA Kageyama Racing	17	(Japan) Yuta Suzuki	All
Akiland Racing	19	(Italy) Lu You De (Note: Lu is a Chinese driver competing under an Italian licence.)	All
Eagle Sports	21	(Japan) Leon Ochiai	2–5, 7
Falcon Motorsport	26	(Japan) Leon Ochiai	1
Falcon Motorsport	26	(Japan) Haru Kataoka	3
Falcon Motorsport	26	(Japan) Takumi Saigusa	7
TGR-DC Racing School	28	(Japan) Yuzuki Miura	All
TGR-DC Racing School	29	(Japan) Masana Muto	All
TGR-DC Racing School	29	(Japan) Riona Tomishita (Note: Masana Muto was entered into the fifth round, but withdrew before it commenced after suffering a wrist injury. He was replaced by Riona Tomishita.)	5
TGR-DC Racing School	35	(Japan) Ryo Sakai	All
TGR-DC Racing School	36	(Japan) Masaki Hamabe	All
TGR-DC Racing School	37	(Japan) Buntaro Igarashi	All
TGR-DC Racing School	38	(Japan) Tomoki Terashima	All
Drago Corse	34	(Japan) Kaoru Yoshida	3–4
B-Max Engineering	42	(Japan) Ryoki Minoura	All
B-Max Engineering	43	(Japan) Haruto Nakai	All
Ponos Racing	45	(Japan) Megumu Suzuki	All
Ponos Racing	54	(Japan) Shota Sakai	All
Fujita Yakkyoku Racing	47	(Japan) Taiga Ishii	1, 3, 5, 7
Fujita Yakkyoku Racing	47	(Japan) Kaoru Yoshida	6
Fujita Yakkyoku Racing	48	(Japan) Taisei Murakami	All
HFDP with B-Max Racing Team	50	(Japan) Syo Momose	All
HFDP with B-Max Racing Team	51	(Japan) Kazuma Kurosawa	All
TGM Grand Prix	53	(Japan) Miku Ikejima	1, 3–5
OTG Motor Sports	60	(Japan) Kenta Kumagai	All
OTG Motor Sports	80	(Japan) Miki Onaga	All
HELM Motorsports	62	(Japan) Kosei Oguma	1–5
Mitsusada Racing	73	(Japan) Ryutaro Sakai	All
Dr. Dry Racing Team	85	(Japan) Kodai Yoshida	1–4
Dr. Dry Racing Team	87	(Japan) Rikuto Toyoshima	1–5, 7
Bionic Jack Racing	99	(Japan) Soichiro Shioda	All

=== Independent Class ===
Team	No.	Driver	Rounds
Akiland Racing	3	(Japan) Shuhei Sato	6
Akiland Racing	71	(Japan) Masayoshi Oyama	All
Akiland Racing	96	(Japan) Makio Saito	All
DayDream Racing	4	(Japan) Yuichi Sasaki	1, 3–7
Team 5ZIGEN	5	(Japan) "Hirobon"	1–5
Buzz Racing	6	(Japan) Shigeto Nagashima	1, 3–5, 7
Team Hashimoto Group	9	(Japan) Kazuhiro Kanayama	All
Rn-sports	10	(Japan) Isao Nakashima	All
Rn-sports	11	(Japan) Hiroshi Sugiyama	1, 3–5, 7
Rn-sports	11	(Japan) Masayuki Ueda	2, 6
Rn-sports	12	(Japan) Kentaro Kojima	All
Rn-sports	92	(Japan) Ryuichi Kunihiro	1, 3, 5, 7
Rn-sports	92	(Japan) Masayuki Ueda	4
HYDRANGEA Kageyama Racing	18	(Japan) Yutaka Toriba	All
Zap Speed	22	(Japan) "Go Shimizu"	1–4
Zap Speed	77	(Japan) "Mototino"	1–4, 7
N-Speed	23	(Japan) "Yugo"	All
B-Max Engineering	30	(Japan) "Dragon"	All
B-Max Engineering	44	(Japan) Nobuhiro Imada	1, 3–4
B-Max Engineering	44	(Japan) "Syuji"	2
B-Max Engineering	88	(Japan) Yasuhiro Shimizu	6–7
Eagle Sports	40	(Japan) Shoichiro Akamatsu	All
Field Motorsport	55	(Japan) "Kentaro"	All
HELM Motorsports	61	(United States) "William"	All
Dr. Dry Racing Team	86	(Japan) Hachiro Osaka	All
M&K Racing	97	(Japan) Mitsuhiro Endo	2–3, 5, 7
Bionic Jack Racing	98	(Japan) "Ikari"	All

== Race calendar ==
All seven rounds were held in Japan. Six rounds were supporting the Super GT events in Japan, with only Okayama supporting the Super Formula Lights.

=== Champion Class ===
Round		Circuit	Date	Pole position	Fastest lap	Winning driver	Winning team
1	R1	Fuji Speedway, Oyama	3 May	(Japan) Ryo Sakai	(Japan) Masana Muto	(Japan) Buntaro Igarashi	TGR-DC Racing School
1	R2	Fuji Speedway, Oyama	4 May	(Japan) Ryo Sakai	(Japan) Masana Muto	(Japan) Masana Muto	TGR-DC Racing School
2	R3	Okayama International Circuit, Mimasaka	13 June	(Japan) Ryo Shirasaki	(Japan) Ryo Shirasaki	(Japan) Ryo Shirasaki	HYDRANGEA Kageyama Racing
2	R4	Okayama International Circuit, Mimasaka	14 June	(Japan) Ryo Shirasaki	(Japan) Ryo Shirasaki	(Japan) Ryo Shirasaki	HYDRANGEA Kageyama Racing
3	R5	Fuji Speedway, Oyama	1 August	(Japan) Ryo Shirasaki	(Japan) Masana Muto	(Japan) Ryo Shirasaki	HYDRANGEA Kageyama Racing
3	R6	Fuji Speedway, Oyama	2 August	(Japan) Ryo Shirasaki	(Japan) Megumu Suzuki	(Japan) Ryo Shirasaki	HYDRANGEA Kageyama Racing
4	R7	Suzuka Circuit, Suzuka	22 August	(Japan) Ryo Shirasaki	(Japan) Ryutaro Sakai	(Japan) Ryo Shirasaki	HYDRANGEA Kageyama Racing
4	R8	Suzuka Circuit, Suzuka	23 August	(Japan) Ryo Shirasaki	(Japan) Ryo Shirasaki	(Japan) Ryo Shirasaki	HYDRANGEA Kageyama Racing
5	R9	Sportsland Sugo, Murata	19 September	(Japan) Soichiro Shioda	(Japan) Leon Ochiai	(Japan) Ryo Sakai	TGR-DC Racing School
5	R10	Sportsland Sugo, Murata	20 September	(Japan) Soichiro Shioda	(Japan) Soichiro Shioda	(Japan) Soichiro Shioda	Bionic Jack Racing
6	R11	Autopolis, Hita	17 October	(Japan) Masaki Hamabe	(Japan) Kenta Kumagai	(Japan) Masaki Hamabe	TGR-DC Racing School
6	R12	Autopolis, Hita	18 October	(Japan) Kenta Kumagai	(Japan) Kenta Kumagai	(Japan) Kenta Kumagai	OTG Motor Sports
7	R13	Mobility Resort Motegi, Motegi	7 November	(Japan) Ryo Sakai	(Japan) Ryo Sakai	(Japan) Ryo Shirasaki	HYDRANGEA Kageyama Racing
7	R14	Mobility Resort Motegi, Motegi	8 November	(Japan) Ryo Sakai	(Japan) Ryo Shirasaki	(Japan) Ryo Shirasaki	HYDRANGEA Kageyama Racing

=== Independent Class ===
Super GT has rescheduled the Motegi round to hold 2 races as a replacement for a previously cancelled race in Malaysia, as a result there was only 1 race held in the Independent Class due to time constraints.

Round		Circuit	Date	Pole position	Fastest lap	Winning driver	Winning team
1	R1	Fuji Speedway, Oyama	3 May	(Japan) Yutaka Toriba	(Japan) Yutaka Toriba	(Japan) Yutaka Toriba	HYDRANGEA Kageyama Racing
1	R2	Fuji Speedway, Oyama	4 May	(Japan) Yutaka Toriba	(Japan) Masayoshi Oyama	(Japan) Yutaka Toriba	HYDRANGEA Kageyama Racing
2	R3	Okayama International Circuit, Mimasaka	13 June	(Japan) "Hirobon"	(Japan) "Hirobon"	(Japan) "Hirobon"	Team 5ZIGEN
2	R4	Okayama International Circuit, Mimasaka	14 June	(Japan) "Hirobon"	(Japan) "Kentaro"	(Japan) "Hirobon"	Team 5ZIGEN
3	R5	Fuji Speedway, Oyama	1 August	(Japan) "Hirobon"	(Japan) Yutaka Toriba	(Japan) "Hirobon"	Team 5ZIGEN
3	R6	Fuji Speedway, Oyama	2 August	(Japan) "Hirobon"	(Japan) Yutaka Toriba	(Japan) Yutaka Toriba	HYDRANGEA Kageyama Racing
4	R7	Suzuka Circuit, Suzuka	22 August	(Japan) Nobuhiro Imada	(Japan) "Kentaro"	(Japan) "Hirobon"	Team 5ZIGEN
4	R8	Suzuka Circuit, Suzuka	23 August	(Japan) "Hirobon"	(Japan) Yutaka Toriba	(Japan) Nobuhiro Imada	B-Max Engineering
5	R9	Sportsland Sugo, Murata	19 September	(Japan) "Hirobon"	(Japan) Yutaka Toriba	(Japan) "Hirobon"	Team 5ZIGEN
5	R10	Sportsland Sugo, Murata	20 September	(Japan) "Kentaro"	(Japan) "Hirobon"	(Japan) "Hirobon"	Team 5ZIGEN
6	R11	Autopolis, Hita	17 October	(Japan) "Kentaro"	(Japan) "Kentaro"	(Japan) "Kentaro"	Field Motorsport
6	R12	Autopolis, Hita	18 October	(Japan) "Kentaro"	(Japan) "Kentaro"	(Japan) "Kentaro"	Field Motorsport
7	R13	Mobility Resort Motegi, Motegi	7 November	(Japan) Yutaka Toriba	(Japan) "Kentaro"	(Japan) Yutaka Toriba	HYDRANGEA Kageyama Racing

== Championship standings ==
Points were awarded to the top ten classified finishers as follows:

Position	**1st**	**2nd**	**3rd**	**4th**	**5th**	**6th**	**7th**	**8th**	**9th**	**10th**
Points	25	18	15	12	10	8	6	4	2	1

=== Champion Class ===
==== Drivers' standings ====
Pos	Driver	FUJ1		OKA		FUJ2		SUZ		SUG		AUT		MOT		Pts
Pos	Driver	R1	R2	R3	R4	R5	R6	R7	R8	R9	R10	R11	R12	R13	R14	Pts
1	(Japan) Ryo Shirasaki	19	Ret	**1**	**1**	**1**	**1**	**1**	**1**	12	2	6	2	1	1	244
2	(Japan) Masana Muto	6	1	2	2	2	9	3	10	WD	WD	7	15	Ret	4	123
3	(Japan) Ryo Sakai	**9**	**27**	3	5	Ret	2	6	2	1	4	11	23	**14**	**3**	123
4	(Japan) Kenta Kumagai	2	4	8	7	Ret	6	18	13	3	16	2	**1**	11	Ret	106
5	(Japan) Masaki Hamabe	Ret	Ret	9	6	4	4	5	8	8	5	**1**	3	16	9	104
6	(Japan) Soichiro Shioda	26	18	22	Ret	11	13	7	3	**9**	**1**	4	4	4	6	80
7	(Japan) Buntaro Igarashi	1	3	16	12	24	8	4	4	6	Ret	16	9	12	Ret	78
8	(Japan) Ryutaro Sakai	14	21	4	3	Ret	18	2	19	5	11	3	Ret	Ret	14	70
9	(Japan) Syo Momose	3	10	19	20	7	3	12	7	4	10	Ret	7	7	Ret	68
10	(Japan) Haruto Nakai	27	2	17	17	Ret	19	20	15	10	3	12	17	3	2	67
11	(Japan) Megumu Suzuki	25	15	14	13	3	14	9	6	Ret	7	5	5	Ret	5	61
12	(Japan) Yuta Suzuki	Ret	8	6	9	5	7	16	16	21	9	10	8	2	22	55
13	(Japan) Yuzuki Miura	4	6	5	8	16	16	8	25	15	6	13	24	17	7	52
14	(Italy) Lu You De	Ret	14	7	4	8	Ret	10	5	14	15	8	11	10	13	38
15	(Japan) Leon Ochiai	16	5	20	19	15	31	14	17	2	12			8	12	32
16	(Japan) Kazuma Kurosawa	28	9	11	10	9	5	28	11	6	18	9	6	Ret	Ret	31
17	(Japan) Ryusho Nakazato	8	16	10	14	6	11	13	Ret	22	23	14	13	5	15	23
18	(Japan) Ryoki Minoura	11	Ret	12	15	13	17	11	9	17	21	19	18	6	8	14
19	(Japan) Tomoki Terashima	7	12	Ret	18	10	10	15	13	18	13	23	10	9	Ret	11
20	(Japan) Sena Yamamoto	5	19	15	11	19	26	17	Ret							10
21	(Japan) Miki Onaga	15	7	24	27	20	23	29	23	Ret	17	15	14	19	16	6
22	(Japan) Rikuto Toyoshima	20	11	23	22	12	21	19	12	16	8			13	10	5
23	(Japan) Masaki Murata	10	29	26	Ret	Ret	25	22	20	26	25			21	19	1
24	(Japan) Shota Sakai	Ret	13	18	23	26	20	25	21	20	14	24	12	15	11	0
25	(New Zealand) William Beck					25	30			11	26	20	22	23	18	0
26	(Japan) Haru Kataoka					14	12									0
27	(Japan) Keigo Okazawa	12	23	21	15											0
28	(Japan) Kosei Oguma	13	17	13	21	17	15	WD	WD							0
29	(Japan) Riona Tomishita									13	24					0
30	(Japan) Toranosuke Takagi	18	24	25	24	23	27	21	18	25	20	18	16	20	Ret	0
31	(Japan) Kodai Yoshida	17	20	WD	WD	WD	WD									0
32	(Japan) Kaoru Yoshida					22	24	24	22			17	20			0
33	(Japan) Taiga Ishii	WD	WD			18	22			19	19			Ret	17	0
34	(Japan) Taisei Murakami	21	25	28	25	Ret	28	27	Ret	23	22	21	21	18	21	0
35	(Japan) Douglas Bolger											22	19			0
36	(Japan) Hiroto Suzuki													22	20	0
37	(Japan) Kota Umemoto	23	22	WD	WD	21	32	23	Ret	WD	WD					0
38	(South Korea) Song Harim	22	26	27	26											0
39	(Japan) Miku Ikejima	24	28			Ret	29	26	24	24	27					0
—	(Japan) Takumi Saigusa													WD	WD	0
Pos	Driver	FUJ1		OKA		FUJ2		SUZ		SUG		AUT		MOT		Pts

Key
Colour	Result
Gold	Winner
Silver	Second place
Bronze	Third place
Green	Other points position
Blue	Other classified position
Blue	Not classified, finished (NC)
Purple	Not classified, retired (Ret)
Red	Did not qualify (DNQ)
Red	Did not pre-qualify (DNPQ)
Black	Disqualified (DSQ)
White	Did not start (DNS)
White	Race cancelled (C)
Blank	Did not practice (DNP)
Blank	Excluded (EX)
Blank	Did not arrive (DNA)
Blank	Withdrawn (WD)
Blank	Did not enter (cell empty)
Text formatting	Meaning
**Bold**	Pole position
Italics	Fastest lap

† — Did not finish but classified

==== Teams' standings ====
Each team acquired the points earned by their highest finishing driver in each race.

Pos	Team	FUJ1		OKA		FUJ2		SUZ		SUG		AUT		MOT		Pts
Pos	Team	R1	R2	R3	R4	R5	R6	R7	R8	R9	R10	R11	R12	R13	R14	Pts
1	HYDRANGEA Kageyama Racing	8	8	1	1	1	1	1	1	12	2	6	2	1	1	252
2	TGR-DC Racing School	1	1	2	2	2	2	3	2	1	4	1	3	9	3	249
3	OTG Motor Sports	2	4	8	7	20	6	18	14	3	16	2	1	11	16	106
4	Bionic Jack Racing	26	18	22	Ret	11	13	7	3	9	1	4	4	4	6	92
5	HFDP with B-Max Racing Team	3	9	11	10	7	3	12	7	4	10	9	7	7	Ret	74
6	Mitsusada Racing	14	21	4	3	Ret	18	2	19	5	11	3	Ret	Ret	14	70
7	B-Max Engineering	11	2	17	15	13	17	11	9	10	3	12	17	3	2	69
8	Ponos Racing	25	13	14	13	3	14	9	6	20	7	5	5	15	5	61
9	Akiland Racing	Ret	14	7	4	8	Ret	10	5	14	15	8	11	10	13	38
10	Eagle Sports			20	19	15	31	14	17	2	12			8	12	22
11	Team 5ZIGEN	5	19	15	11	19	26	17	Ret							10
12	Falcon Motorsport	16	5			14	12							WD	WD	10
13	Dr. Dry Racing Team	17	11	23	22	12	21	19	12	16	8			13	10	5
14	Zap Speed	10	29	26	Ret	21	25	22	20	26	25			21	19	1
15	Buzz Racing	18	24	25	24	23	27	21	18	11	20	18	16	20	Ret	0
16	Ragno Motor Sports	12	23	21	16											0
17	HELM Motorsports	13	17	13	21	17	15	WD	WD							0
18	Fujita Yakkyoku Racing	21	25	28	25	18	22	27	Ret	19	19	27	20	18	17	0
19	Drago Corse					22	24	24	22							0
20	TGM Grand Prix	24	28			Ret	29	26	24	24	27					0
Pos	Team	FUJ1		OKA		FUJ2		SUZ		SUG		AUT		MOT		Pts

=== Independent Class ===
==== Drivers' standings ====
Pos	Driver	FUJ1		OKA		FUJ2		SUZ		SUG		AUT		MOT	Pts
Pos	Driver	R1	R2	R3	R4	R5	R6	R7	R8	R9	R10	R11	R12	R13	Pts
1	(Japan) "Hirobon"	3	Ret	**1**	**1**	**1**	**2**	1	**2**	**1**	1				201
2	(Japan) Yutaka Toriba	**1**	**1**	4	Ret	4	1	Ret	Ret	2	15	2	2	**1**	178
3	(Japan) "Kentaro"	14	Ret	2	2	2	17	4	3	4	**2**	**1**	**1**	2	178
4	(Japan) Nobuhiro Imada	2	6			3	3	**Ret**	1						81
5	(Japan) "Dragon"	19	4	11	4	9	4	2	4	WD	WD	4	Ret	12	80
6	(Japan) Masayoshi Oyama	6	3	5	5	10	6	9	7	8	5	9	7	9	80
7	(Japan) Shoichiro Akamatsu	11	5	8	12	13	5	7	11	3	3	5	Ret	6	78
8	(Japan) Makio Saito	10	Ret	6	Ret	8	DSQ	3	Ret	6	6	3	Ret	3	74
9	(Japan) "Ikari"	7	2	3	6	20	DSQ	15	DNS	5	12	6	Ret	8	69
10	(United States) "William"	8	Ret	7	7	Ret	Ret	6	12	Ret	4	Ret	4	4	60
11	(Japan) Isao Nakashima	4	8	9	8	7	7	11	Ret	7	9	Ret	3	10	58
12	(Japan) Kentaro Kojima	9	Ret	10	10	5	9	8	6	9	8	7	Ret	7	46
13	(Japan) Masayuki Ueda			Ret	3			5	5			Ret	Ret		35
14	(Japan) "Go Shimizu"	5	9	12	9	6	8	13	8						30
15	(Japan) Yasuhiro Shimizu											Ret	5	5	20
16	(Japan) Yuichi Sasaki	12	Ret			11	Ret	Ret	9	11	7	8	6	11	20
17	(Japan) Hiroshi Sugiyama	13	7			12	10	Ret	13	14	11				7
18	(Japan) Shuhei Sato											Ret	8		4
19	(Japan) Shigeto Nagashima	15	10			15	12	10	14	10	13			Ret	3
20	(Japan) Kazuhiro Kanayama	DNQ	DNQ	DNQ	DNQ	17	16	12	15	15	Ret	11	9	15	2
21	(Japan) Hachiro Osaka	16	11	13	11	14	11	Ret	10	13	10	Ret	Ret	WD	2
22	(Japan) "Yugo"	18	14	16	15	18	15	14	16	16	14	10	10	16	1
23	(Japan) "Mototino"	Ret	12	15	13	Ret	14	16	DNS					13	0
24	(Japan) Mitsuhiro Endo			WD	WD	16	13			12	Ret			Ret	0
25	(Japan) Ryuichi Kunihiro	17	13			19	Ret			WD	WD			14	0
26	(Japan) "Syuji"			14	14										0
Pos	Driver	FUJ1		OKA		FUJ2		SUZ		SUG		AUT		MOT	Pts

==== Teams' standings ====
Each team acquired the points earned by their highest finishing driver in each race.

Pos	Team	FUJ1		OKA		FUJ2		SUZ		SUG		AUT		MOT	Pts
Pos	Team	R1	R2	R3	R4	R5	R6	R7	R8	R9	R10	R11	R12	R13	Pts
1	Team 5ZIGEN	3	Ret	1	1	1	2	1	2	1	1				201
2	Field Motorsport	14	Ret	2	2	2	17	4	3	4	2	1	1	2	179
3	HYDRANGEA Kageyama Racing	1	1	4	Ret	4	1	Ret	Ret	2	15	2	2	1	178
4	B-Max Engineering	2	4	11	4	3	3	2	1	WD	WD	4	5	5	147
5	Akiland Racing	6	3	5	5	8	6	3	7	6	5	3	7	3	130
6	Rn-sports	4	7	9	3	5	7	5	5	7	8	7	3	7	108
7	Eagle Sports	11	5	8	12	13	5	7	11	3	3	5	Ret	6	78
8	Bionic Jack Racing	7	2	3	6	20	DSQ	15	DNS	5	12	6	Ret	8	69
9	HELM Motorsports	8	Ret	7	7	Ret	Ret	6	12	Ret	4	Ret	4	4	60
10	Zap Speed	5	9	12	9	6	8	13	8						30
11	DayDream Racing	12	Ret			11	Ret	Ret	9	11	7	8	6	11	20
12	Buzz Racing	15	10			15	12	10	14	10	13			Ret	3
13	Team Hashimoto Group	DNQ	DNQ	DNQ	DNQ	17	16	12	15	14	Ret	11	9	15	2
14	Dr. Dry Racing Team	16	11	13	11	14	11	Ret	10	13	10	Ret	Ret	WD	2
15	N-Speed	18	14	16	15	18	16	14	16	16	14	10	10	16	2
16	M&K Racing			WD	WD	16	13			12	Ret			Ret	0
Pos	Team	FUJ1		OKA		FUJ2		SUZ		SUG		AUT		MOT	Pts
