= 1998 Coca-Cola 500 =

Race details
- Exhibition race in the 1998 NASCAR Winston Cup Series season
- Date: November 22, 1998
- Location: Twin Ring Motegi, Motegi, Japan
- Course: Permanent racing facility
- Course length: 1.5 miles (2.5 km)
- Distance: 201 laps, 311.3 mi (500.9 km)
- Weather: Temperatures ranging between 5 °C (41 °F) and 10 °C (50 °F)
- Average speed: 112.558 mph (181.145 km/h)

Pole position
Driver	Jeremy Mayfield	Penske Racing South
- Time: 35.116 seconds

Most laps led
Driver	Mike Skinner	Richard Childress Racing
- Laps: 94

Winner
No. 31	Mike Skinner	Richard Childress Racing

Television in the United States
- Network: TBS
- Announcers: Ken Squier, Buddy Baker, Dick Berggren

The Coca-Cola 500 was a non-championship exhibition NASCAR stock car race held on November 22, 1998, during the 1998 NASCAR Winston Cup Series season. The race took place on the Twin Ring Motegi oval course in the town of Motegi on the main Japanese island of Honshu. It was the third straight year that NASCAR held an exhibition race in Japan, previously hosting races on the Suzuka Circuit in 1996 and 1997.

Teams from the Winston Cup Series, Busch Series, Craftsman Truck Series and Winston West Series made the trip to Japan to compete in the race. Four Japanese drivers entered the event as well. The race was also the first in which Dale Earnhardt and his son, Dale Earnhardt Jr. competed against one another in a NASCAR race, driving Nos. 3 and 1 Chevrolets, respectively. The pole position was won by Jeremy Mayfield of Penske Racing South, while Mike Skinner of Richard Childress Racing won the race. Hendrick Motorsports' Jeff Gordon finished second, while Mayfield finished third.

== Background ==
Located 60 miles (97 km) northeast of Tokyo, Twin Ring Motegi opened on August 1, 1997. In early 1998, plans to continue hosting the NASCAR Thunder 100 at Suzuka Circuit were cancelled, and as a result, the NASCAR race in Japan was moved to the 1.5 mi (2.4 km) Motegi oval. 28 cars traveled to Japan for the race, and a total of 31 drivers competed in the race, 13 from the Winston Cup Series, 11 from the Winston West Series, two from the Busch Series, one from the Craftsman Truck Series and four from Japan.

== Qualifying ==
Qualifying took place on November 21. Jeremy Mayfield won the pole position for the race with a lap time of 35.116 seconds, and a speed of 158.799 miles per hour (255.562 km/h), his second pole of 1998. Three-time and reigning Cup champion Jeff Gordon qualified second with 35.122 seconds and 158.772 mph (255.519 km/h), followed by Mike Skinner with 35.162 seconds and 158.592 mph (255.229 km/h). Elliott Sadler and Darrell Waltrip, filling in for the injured Dale Jarrett, rounded out the top five, while Jeff Burton, Bill Elliott, Rusty Wallace, Dale Earnhardt Jr., and Lance Norick closed out the top ten.

== Race ==
Although Jeremy Mayfield led the first lap, Jeff Gordon claimed the lead on the ensuing lap and led until lap 21, relinquishing first to Jeff Burton. From laps 28 to 49, the lead would be exchanged by Mike Skinner and Rusty Wallace, with Sterling Marlin, Burton and Mayfield also gaining the lead afterwards. Skinner, Wallace, Burton and Mayfield would all lead laps until lap 90, when Gordon took the lead, holding it for 49 laps. On lap 139, Dale Earnhardt took the lead, but Skinner passed him and Gordon on the following lap, and led for the remainder of the race, defeating Gordon by 0.153 seconds. Gordon, Mayfield, Burton and Wallace comprised the remainder of the top five, while Dale Earnhardt Jr., Bill Elliott, Dale Earnhardt, Sterling Marlin and Michael Waltrip finished in the top ten. Scott Gaylord was the highest-finishing Winston West driver, finishing 13th.

== Aftermath ==
In the post-race press conference, NASCAR president Mike Helton stated that since the three-year Cup Series contract to run in Japan expired after the 1998 race, the Winston West Series would hold the event as the series' season-ending race in 1999; Kevin Richards won the race. However, due to high costs for transport to the event and poor attendance, the series did not return after the 1999 race. Later in the conference, Helton was asked whether Japanese manufacturer Honda would join NASCAR, but stated that it did not "have a motor that meets specifications for NASCAR racing." National rivals Toyota would eventually join the NASCAR Craftsman Truck Series in 2004 and eventually the Cup Series in 2007. In 2024, reports of Honda's potential entry began to resurface, amidst questions on the future of their IndyCar Series program.

The international exhibition race was later speculated to be moved to EuroSpeedway Lausitz in Germany. As of 2013, NASCAR has not expressed any interest in having its national series run an international exhibition race; senior vice president Steve O'Donnell stated, "We've had 20 groups approach us from China. But most of them are one-offs. We keep pushing back and saying we're going to do this but in a smart way. If you can show us how we build stock-car racing, that's something we want to pursue." The second-tier series did hold international races (albeit for championship points) in Mexico and Canada in the 2000s, and NASCAR considered a Canadian race for the 2024 Cup Series schedule, but the proposal fell through and a race at Iowa Speedway took its place in the final 2024 schedule. (A points-paying Cup race in the country was previously held in 1958, the Jim Mideon 500, at Exhibition Stadium in Toronto, Ontario.) The first points-paying international NASCAR Cup Series race since 1958 was finally held in 2025, at Autódromo Hermanos Rodríguez in Mexico, which previously hosted second-tier series races.

== Results ==
=== Qualifying ===
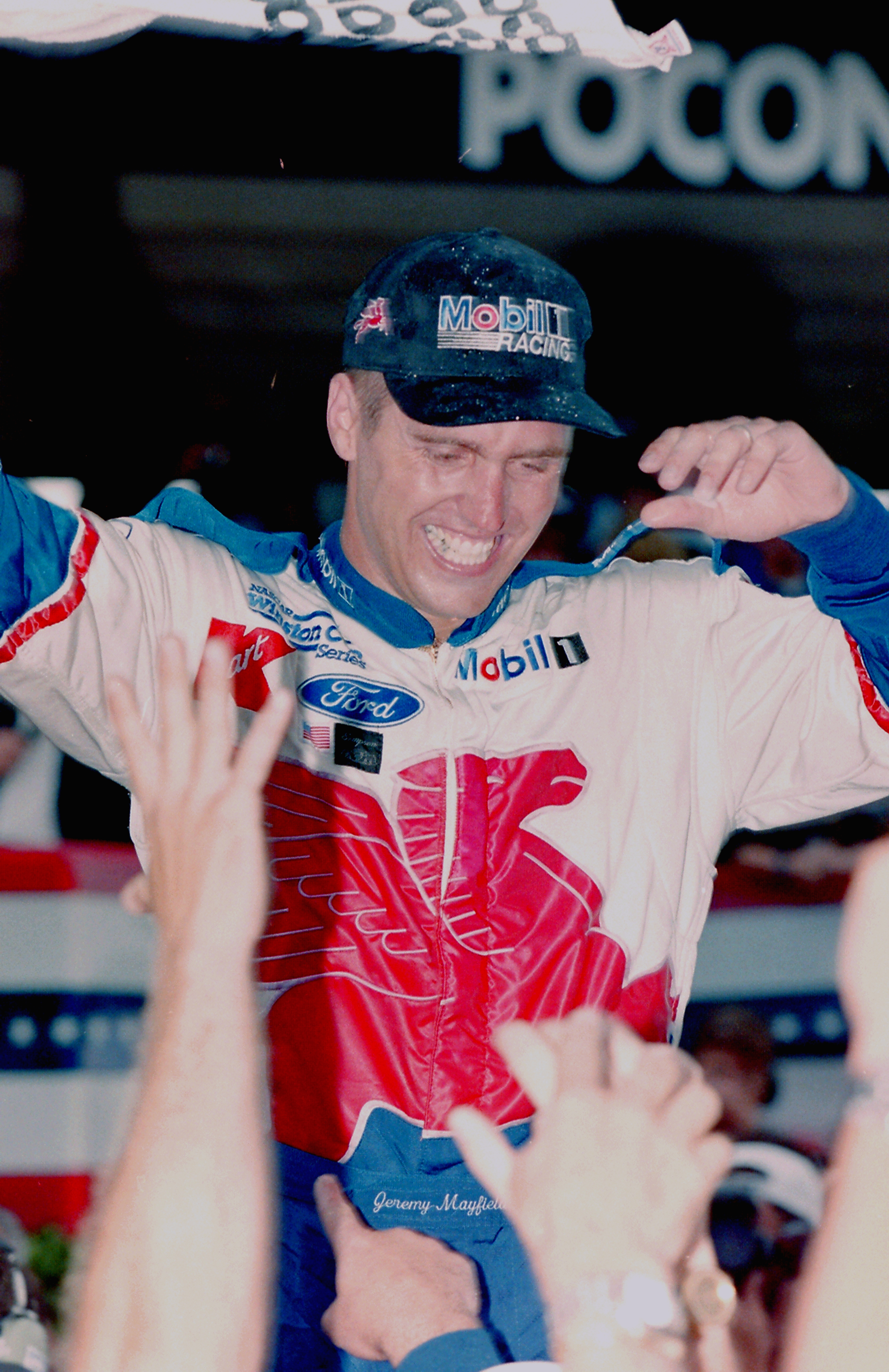
Jeremy Mayfield won the pole position.

Pos	No.	Driver	Team	Manufacturer	Time	Speed
1	12	Jeremy Mayfield	Penske Racing South	Ford	35.116	158.779
2	24	Jeff Gordon	Hendrick Motorsports	Chevrolet	35.122	158.772
3	31	Mike Skinner	Richard Childress Racing	Chevrolet	35.162	158.592
4	21	Elliott Sadler	Wood Brothers Racing	Ford	35.259	158.155
5	88	Darrell Waltrip	Robert Yates Racing	Ford	35.371	157.654
6	99	Jeff Burton	Roush Racing	Ford	35.399	157.530
7	94	Bill Elliott	Bill Elliott Racing	Ford	35.499	157.086
8	2	Rusty Wallace	Penske Racing South	Ford	35.500	157.082
9	1	Dale Earnhardt Jr.	Dale Earnhardt, Inc.	Chevrolet	35.524	156.975
10	60	Lance Norick	L & R Motorsports	Ford	35.840	155.591
11	7	Michael Waltrip	Geoff Bodine Racing	Ford	35.883	155.405
12	40	Sterling Marlin	Team SABCO	Chevrolet	35.983	154.973
13	4	Bobby Hamilton	Morgan-McClure Motorsports	Chevrolet	35.987	154.956
14	55	Kenny Wallace	Andy Petree Racing	Chevrolet	36.028	154.780
15	3	Dale Earnhardt	Richard Childress Racing	Chevrolet	36.053	154.672
16	58	Ricky Craven	SBIII Motorsports	Ford	36.225	153.938
17	67	Scott Gaylord	SMS Motorsports	Ford	36.480	152.862
18	16	Brendan Gaughan	Bill McAnally Racing	Chevrolet	36.664	152.178
19	11	Austin Cameron	AC Motorsports	Chevrolet	36.794	151.557
20	26	Ron Burns	Advance Motorsports	Ford	36.879	151.208
21	98	Hideo Fukuyama	Davis Racing Enterprises	Ford	37.045	150.530
22	8	Jeff Davis	Davis Racing Enterprises	Ford	37.123	150.214
23	82	Randy Nelson	Core Motorsports	Ford	37.164	150.048
24	44	Kelly Tanner	Tanner Racing	Pontiac	37.172	150.016
25	08	Ron Hornaday Jr.	Midgley Motorsports	Chevrolet	37.295	149.521
26	10	Butch Gilliland	Jenn West Motorsports	Ford	37.388	149.149
27	95	Gary Smith	Wade Racing	Ford	37.629	148.194
28	09	Motohiro Nakaji	Midgley Motorsports	Pontiac	38.194	146.002
29	28	Kazuteru Wakida	Collins Motorsports	Chevrolet	38.677	144.179
30	00	Keiichi Tsuchiya	Team DD	Ford	38.711	144.052
31	86	Rich Woodland Jr.	Woodland Racing	Chevrolet	N/A	.000

=== Race results ===
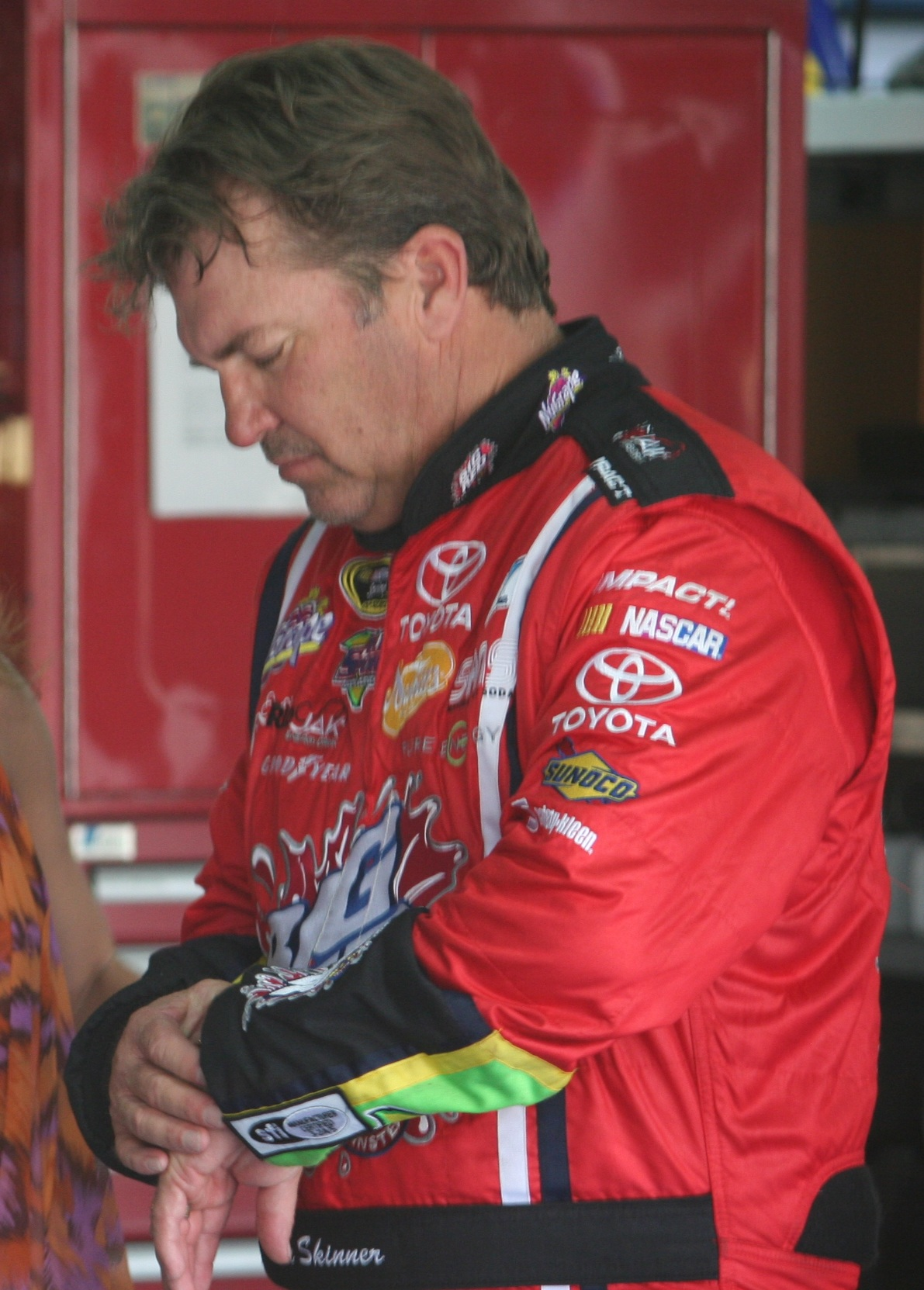
Mike Skinner (seen in 2011) won the race.

Pos	Grid	No.	Driver	Team	Manufacturer	Laps	Led
1	3	31	Mike Skinner	Richard Childress Racing	Chevrolet	201	94
2	2	24	Jeff Gordon	Hendrick Motorsports	Chevrolet	201	69
3	1	12	Jeremy Mayfield	Penske Racing South	Ford	201	10
4	6	99	Jeff Burton	Roush Racing	Ford	201	14
5	8	2	Rusty Wallace	Penske Racing South	Ford	201	11
6	9	1	Dale Earnhardt Jr.	Dale Earnhardt, Inc.	Chevrolet	201	0
7	7	94	Bill Elliott	Bill Elliott Racing	Ford	201	0
8	15	3	Dale Earnhardt	Richard Childress Racing	Chevrolet	201	1
9	12	40	Sterling Marlin	Team SABCO	Chevrolet	201	2
10	11	7	Michael Waltrip	Geoff Bodine Racing	Ford	199	0
11	14	55	Kenny Wallace	Andy Petree Racing	Chevrolet	199	0
12	10	60	Lance Norick	L & R Motorsports	Ford	199	0
13	17	67	Scott Gaylord	SMS Motorsports	Ford	199	0
14	22	8	Jeff Davis	Davis Racing Enterprises	Ford	198	0
15	25	08	Ron Hornaday Jr.	Midgley Motorsports	Chevrolet	197	0
16	26	10	Butch Gilliland	Jenn West Motorsports	Ford	195	0
17	21	98	Hideo Fukuyama	Davis Racing Enterprises	Ford	194	0
18	13	4	Bobby Hamilton	Morgan-McClure Motorsports	Chevrolet	188	0
19	18	16	Brendan Gaughan	Bill McAnally Racing	Chevrolet	185	0
20	4	21	Elliott Sadler	Wood Brothers Racing	Ford	170	0
21	20	26	Ron Burns	Advance Motorsports	Ford	144	0
22	16	58	Ricky Craven	SBIII Motorsports	Ford	108	0
23	19	11	Austin Cameron	AC Motorsports	Chevrolet	105	0
24	5	88	Darrell Waltrip	Robert Yates Racing	Ford	84	0
25	27	95	Gary Smith	Wade Racing	Ford	54	0
26	30	00	Keiichi Tsuchiya	Team DD	Ford	49	0
27	29	82	Randy Nelson	Core Motorsports	Ford	44	0
28	29	28	Kazuteru Wakida	Collins Motorsports	Chevrolet	40	0
29	24	44	Kelly Tanner	Tanner Racing	Pontiac	27	0
30	28	09	Motohiro Nakaji	Midgley Motorsports	Pontiac	23	0
31	31	86	Rich Woodland Jr.	Woodland Racing	Chevrolet	3	0
