= F4 Japanese Championship =

Annual motor racing competition

- Category: FIA Formula 4
- Country: Japan
- Inaugural season: 2015
- Constructors: Toray Carbon Magic
- Engine suppliers: TOM'S Toyota
- Tyre suppliers: Dunlop (Sumitomo)
- Drivers' champion: Champion: (Japan) Ryo Shirasaki; Independent: (Japan) "Hirobon"
- Teams' champion: Champion: (Japan) HYDRANGEA Kageyama Racing; Independent: (Japan) Team 5ZIGEN
- Official website: Official website

The F4 Japanese Championship (ＦＩＡ－フォーミュラ４ 地方選手権, FIA F4 Chihou Senshuken) is a formula racing series held in Japan regulated according to FIA Formula 4 regulations. The inaugural season was held in 2015.

== History ==
Gerhard Berger and the FIA Single Seater Commission launched the current FIA Formula 4 in March 2013. The goal of FIA Formula 4 was to make the ladder to Formula 1 more transparent. Besides sporting and technical regulations, costs are regulated too: Any eligible car may not exceed a purchase price of €30,000. A single season in Formula 4 may not exceed €100,000 in costs.

The F4 Japanese Championship was launched by the GT Association on 16 December 2014, as one of the second phases of Formula 4 championships to be launched following the Italian F4 Championship and Formula 4 Sudamericana which launched in 2014. All rounds are support events to the Super GT Series.

Japanese race car constructor Dome was contracted to design and build the spec F110 chassis. The cars are constructed out of carbon fibre and feature a monocoque chassis. The engine is a 2.0-litre TOM'S Toyota inline-four. Dunlop (Sumitomo Rubber Industries) is the tyre supplier.

The series is open to drivers aged 16 and up. While primarily contested by young drivers moving up the single-seater ladder, older amateur drivers also compete in the series in the Independent Cup category.

A second-generation F4 Japanese Championship car built by Toray Carbon Magic, called the MCSC-24, was first revealed in 2022 and will debut in 2024, with an integrated halo safety device and a more powerful TOM'S Toyota engine.

== Point system ==
Position	1st	2nd	3rd	4th	5th	6th	7th	8th	9th	10th
Points	20	15	12	10	8	6	4	3	2	1

== Champions ==
All teams and drivers were Japanese-registered.

=== Drivers ===
Season	Driver	Team	Poles	Wins	Podiums	Fastest laps	Points	Clinched	Margin
2015	(Japan) Sho Tsuboi	(Japan) TOM'S Spirit	4	7	10	4	195	Race 14 of 14	3
2016	(Japan) Ritomo Miyata	(Japan) TOM'S Spirit	2	2	5	3	142	Race 14 of 14	4
2017	(Japan) Ritomo Miyata	(Japan) TOM'S Spirit	5	4	11	6	231	Race 14 of 14	7
2018	(Japan) Yuki Tsunoda	(Japan) Honda Formula Dream Project	8	7	11	4	245	Race 14 of 14	14
2019	(Japan) Ren Sato	(Japan) Honda Formula Dream Project	8	11	13	5	311	Race 10 of 14	164
2020	(Japan) Hibiki Taira	(Japan) TGR-DC Racing School	7	10	12	4	270.5	Race 10 of 12	90
2021	(Japan) Seita Nonaka	(Japan) TGR-DC Racing School	1	6	8	5	217	Race 14 of 14	4
2022	(Japan) Syun Koide	(Japan) Honda Formula Dream Project	8	9	12	6	279	Race 14 of 14	33
2023	(Japan) Rikuto Kobayashi	(Japan) TGR-DC Racing School	5	5	9	4	221	Race 14 of 14	12
2024	(Japan) Yuto Nomura	(Japan) HFDP with B-Max Racing Team	3	7	10	4	236	Race 13 of 14	69
2025	(Japan) Tokiya Suzuki	(Japan) TGR-DC Racing School	3	4	9	1	219	Race 14 of 14	7.5
2026	(Japan) Ryo Shirasaki	(Japan) HYDRANGEA Kageyama Racing	6	6	8	3	194	Race 12 of 14	83

=== Teams ===
Season	Team	Poles	Wins	Podiums	Fastest laps	Points	Margin	Independent Class Team
2015	(Japan) TOM'S Spirit	4	7	10	4	225	9	not held
2016	(Japan) Honda Formula Dream Project	1	2	12	3	203	21	not held
2017	(Japan) Honda Formula Dream Project	9	11	26	6	314	83	not held
2018	(Japan) Honda Formula Dream Project	12	10	23	7	316	106	not held
2019	(Japan) Honda Formula Dream Project	14	14	25	14	350	213	not held
2020	(Japan) TGR-DC Racing School	7	10	17	4	273.5	93	not held
2021	(Japan) TGR-DC Racing School	3	8	17	10	285	25	not held
2022	(Japan) Honda Formula Dream Project	10	12	23	7	336	111	not held
2023	(Japan) TGR-DC Racing School	6	8	22	5	290	58	not held
2024	(Japan) HFDP with B-Max Racing Team	9	8	18	8	260	80	(Japan) B-Max Racing Team
2025	(Japan) HYDRANGEA Kageyama Racing	5	8	17	8	269.5	44.5	(Japan) B-Max Racing Team
2026	(Japan) TBC							(Japan) Team 5ZIGEN

=== Independent Cup ===
Season	Driver	Team	Wins (Indep/Cup)	Podiums (Indep/Cup)	Points (Indep/Cup)	Margin
2018	(Japan) Masayuki Ueda	(Japan) Rn-sports	2	10	207	6
2019	(Japan) Sergeyevich Sato	(Japan) Field Motorsport	5	11	241	59
2020	(Japan) Sergeyevich Sato	(Japan) Field Motorsport	6	10	225	27.5
2021	(Japan) "Hirobon"	(Japan) Rn-sports	4	11	238	15
2022	(Japan) Yutaka Toriba	(Japan) HELM Motorsports	10	12	306	104
2023	(Japan) Makoto Fujiwara	(Japan) B-Max Racing Team	3	5	151	12
2024	(Japan) "Dragon"	(Japan) B-Max Racing Team	5	9	202	2.5
2025	(Japan) Nobuhiro Imada	(Japan) B-Max Racing Team	3	11	226	1.5
2026	(Japan) "Hirobon"	(Japan) Team 5ZIGEN	6	9	201	66

== Circuits ==
- **Bold** denotes a circuit is used in the 2026 season.

Number	Circuits	Rounds	Years
1	(Shizuoka Prefecture) **Fuji Speedway**	22 (Note: Fuji Speedway has hosted 2 rounds every year.)	2015–present
2	(Mie Prefecture) **Suzuka Circuit**	14 (Note: Suzuka Circuit hosted 2 rounds in 2022–2024.)	2015–present
3	(Tochigi Prefecture) **Mobility Resort Motegi**	12 (Note: Mobility Resort Motegi hosted 2 rounds in 2021.)	2015–present
4	(Miyagi Prefecture) **Sportsland Sugo**	10	2015–2019, 2021–present
5	(Ōita Prefecture) **Autopolis**	8	2015, 2017–2019, 2022–present
6	(Okayama Prefecture) **Okayama International Circuit**	5	2015–2019, 2026

== In other media ==
The 2023 anime Overtake! is based around the F4 Japanese Championship.
