= NASCAR AutoZone Elite Division, Northwest Series =

American auto racing series

AutoZone Elite Division, Northwest Series
- Category: Late models
- Country: United States; Canada
- Region: Northwest United States
- Inaugural season: 1985
- Folded: 2006

The NASCAR AutoZone Elite Division, Northwest Series was a regional NASCAR late model stock car racing series first codified in 1985. The series, along with its three other series in its division, folded in 2006. Unlike the NASCAR national series, drivers competed in light-weight late model race cars. The series sanctioned races in Washington, Idaho, Oregon, Montana and a few races in Canada.

== List of champions ==
The following drivers won the Northwest Series championship between the series' creation in 1985 and its termination in 2006.

Year	Champion	Most Popular Driver	Rookie of the Year
1985	Garrett Evans		
1986	Ron Eaton		Tobey Butler
1987	Tobey Butler		Jerry Bowers
1988	Ron Eaton		Perry Chappelle
1989	Garrett Evans		Pete Nash
1990	John Dillon		Hershel McGriff Jr.
1991	Monte English		Mike Ramsey
1992	Dirk Stephens		Kevin Quesnell
1993	Kirk Rogers	Dan Press	Tom Sweatman
1994	Garrett Evans	Ernie Cope	Chris Cunningham
1995	Ron Eaton	Ron Eaton	Roger Habich
1996	Kelly Tanner	Garrett Evans	Marc Groskreutz
1997	Kelly Tanner	Greg Biffle	Jeff Bird
1998	Gary Lewis	Kenny Rich	Wilbur Bruce
1999	Pete Harding	Wilbur Bruce	Joe Benedetti
2000	Garrett Evans	Garrett Evans	Gaylon Stewart
2001	Kevin Hamlin	Kevin Hamlin	John Bender
2002	Kevin Hamlin	Joe Benedetti	Kelly Mann
2003	Jeff Jefferson	Kevin Hamlin	Jason Jefferson
2004	Jeff Jefferson	Garrett Evans	Travis Bennett
2005	Jeff Jefferson	Jeff Jefferson	Jeff Barkshire
2006	Gary Lewis	Garrett Evans	Shane Mitchell
