= Motegi Circuit =

Racing circuit in Tochigi Prefecture, Japan

Mobility Resort Motegi
- Circuit Logo (2022–present)

- Combined Circuit Map (1997–present)
- Location: Motegi, Tochigi Prefecture
- Coordinates: 36°32′0″N 140°13′42″E
- Capacity: 68,156
- FIA Grade: 2
- Owner: Honda Motor Co., Ltd. (1997–present)
- Operator: Honda Mobilityland (2006–present)
- Broke ground: January 1995; 31 years ago
- Opened: 17 August 1997; 29 years ago
- Construction cost: ¥5 billion (44,873,000.00 USD)
- Former names: Twin Ring Motegi (August 1997–February 2022)
- Major events: Current: Grand Prix motorcycle racing Japanese motorcycle Grand Prix (1999, 2004–2019, 2022–present); Super GT (1998–present); Super Formula (1997–present); Asia Road Racing Championship (2024–present); Future: Japan Cup Series (2023, 2027); Former: GT World Challenge Asia (2023); WTCC Race of Japan (2015–2017); Grand Prix motorcycle racing Pacific motorcycle Grand Prix (2000–2003); IndyCar Series Indy Japan 300 (1998–2011); Coca-Cola 500 (1998)
- Website: www.mr-motegi.jp

Road Course (1997–present)
- Length: 4.801 km (2.983 mi)
- Turns: 14
- Race lap record: 1:31.379 ( (Japan) Sena Sakaguchi, Dallara SF23, 2026, Super Formula)

East Road Course (1997–present)
- Length: 3.400 km (2.113 mi)
- Turns: 11
- Race lap record: 1:22.447 ( (Japan) Yasuhiro Takahashi, Dome FD, 2003, FD)

West Road Course (1997–present)
- Length: 1.400 km (0.870 mi)
- Turns: 6
- Race lap record: 0:37.697 ( (Japan) Masanori Sekiya, Toyota Chaser, 1998, ST)

Speedway (1997–2026)
- Length: 2.493 km (1.549 mi)
- Turns: 4
- Banking: 10°
- Race lap record: 0:25.830 ( (Brazil) Hélio Castroneves, Lola B99/00, 1999, CART)

The Motegi Circuit (もてぎサーキット), officially known as Mobility Resort Motegi (モビリティリゾートもてぎ), is a motorsport venue located in Motegi, Tochigi Prefecture, Japan. Originally Twin Ring Motegi (ツインリンクもてぎ), the venue's name came from the facility having two race tracks: a 2.493 km (1.549 mi) oval track (that is currently being demolished) and a 4.801 km (2.983 mi) road course. It was built in 1997 by Honda Motor Co., Ltd., as part of the company's effort to bring the Championship Auto Racing Teams series to Japan, helping to increase their knowledge of American open-wheel racing. The oval was last raced on in 2010 by the IndyCar Series. On March 1, 2022, the name of the track was changed to Mobility Resort Motegi, coinciding with the 25th anniversary of the facility. In 2026, parts of the oval were demolished and repurposed as spectator areas.

The road course's most notable event is the Japanese motorcycle Grand Prix which is currently held every year. The track also currently hosts rounds in the domestic Super Formula Championship and Super GT series each year.

== Speedway ==
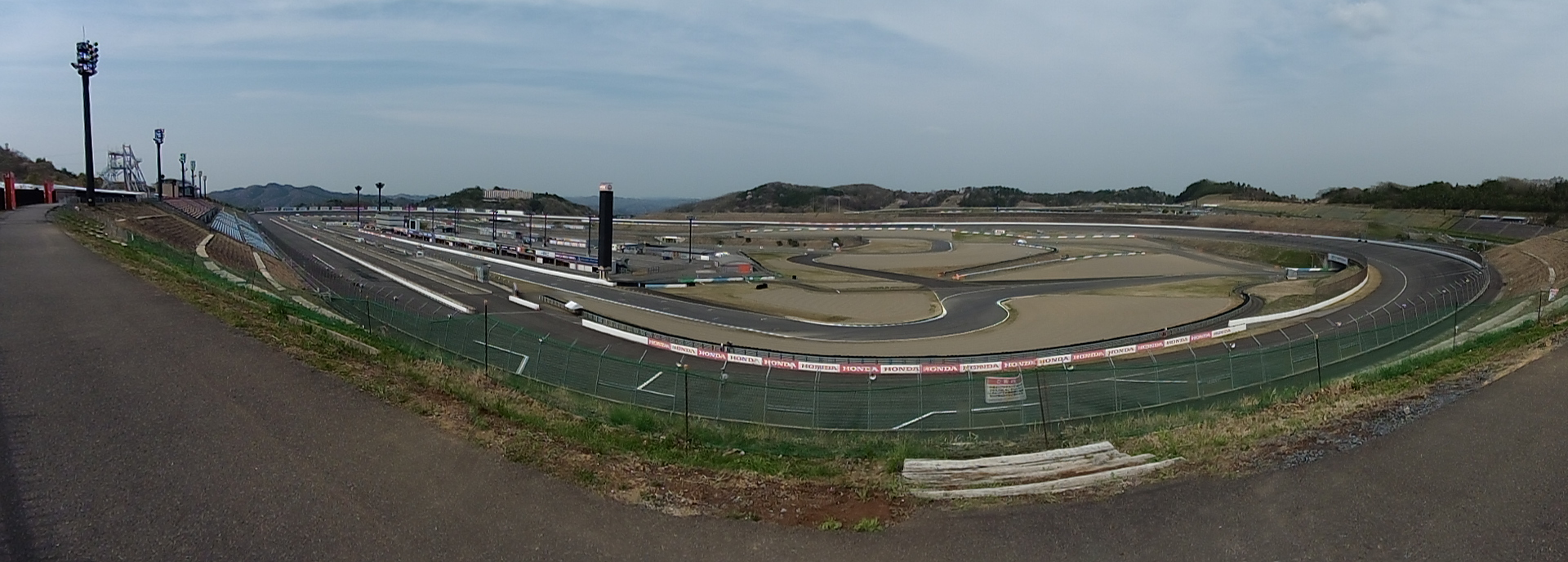
View of the oval

The oval course was the only one of its kind in Japan used for competitive racing. It was a low-banked, 1.549 mi (2.493 km) egg-shaped course, with turns three and four being much tighter than turns one and two. On March 28, 1998, CART held the inaugural Indy Japan 300 at Twin Ring Motegi Speedway. The race was won by Mexican driver Adrián Fernández. CART continued racing at Twin Ring Motegi Speedway from 1998–2002. In 2003, Honda entered the Indy Racing League and the race became a part of the IRL schedule. In addition to IndyCar racing, the track has also hosted a single NASCAR exhibition race in 1998 and the season finale race for the NASCAR Winston West Series in 1999.

Honda, which had built the oval for the express purpose of developing its oval-racing program for IndyCar racing, did not win a race at the track for its first six years of operation. In 2004, Dan Wheldon took the first win for Honda on the oval. In 2008, the Motegi oval gained additional publicity when Danica Patrick became the first woman to win an IndyCar race, beating Hélio Castroneves for her first and only IndyCar victory.

The 2011 season was the last season of IndyCar in Motegi. It had been dropped from the calendar as organizers looked to maximize viewing audiences. The road course, rather than the super speedway, was used for the 2011 race due to damage to the oval track resulting from the 2011 Tōhoku earthquake. However, the decision to drop Motegi from the IndyCar calendar had been made before the earthquake. The oval remained in use for Honda's annual Thanks Day event showcasing various Honda road and racing vehicles, mainly from the nearby Honda Collection Hall, with Takuma Sato running a lap of the course in his 2017 Indianapolis 500 winning car seven years since the last IndyCar race in the oval. It was partially demolished in 2026. Parts of the oval remain in use as spectator and parking areas. There are plans for the oval to be further demolished and repurposed for spectator seating and camping areas, for future events.

=== Track length of paved oval ===
The track length was counted differently by different series that run at Mobility Resort Motegi. The NASCAR timing and scoring use a length of 1.549 mi (2.493 km). This length was used by CART in their races between 1998 and 2002. The IRL measured in 2003 a length of 1.520 mi (2.446 km). This length was also used in the following races until 2010.

=== NASCAR history ===
Mike Skinner won the only NASCAR Winston Cup Series exhibition race held at the track in 1998, the Coca-Cola 500. Skinner won driving the No.31 Chevrolet for Richard Childress Racing. The race was most noted for being the first oval track NASCAR race in Japan as well as being the first in which Dale Earnhardt and his son, Dale Earnhardt Jr., competed with one another, driving No. 3 and No. 1 Coca-Cola Chevrolets, respectively. The track also hosted the NASCAR Winston West Series finale in 1999, with Kevin Richards getting the win.

== Road course ==
The road course is 4.801 km (2.983 mi) long and is unique in sharing garage and grandstand facilities with the oval course, but being entirely separate otherwise. Although they are separate tracks, it is impossible for races to occur simultaneously on the two courses; to access the oval track, teams must cross the road course pit and front straight. The road course also runs in the opposite direction from the oval; clockwise, rather than counter-clockwise.

The course itself is built in a stop-start straight-hairpin style, which flows differently than many similarly-sized tracks. By Japanese standards the circuit is exceptionally flat, with only a slight elevation rise towards the hairpin turn. The road course is much busier than the oval track, with Super Formula visiting twice, Super GT and Super Taikyu cars once each, and local events almost every weekend. The road course can be used in three ways: the full course, or two "short courses" can be made, using connecting roadways. These short courses are usually used for junior formula events, such as Formula 4 and FJ1600.

The road course is also a popular motorcycle racing track, with the MotoGP usually visiting once a year, as well as several Japanese national bike racing series. It has hosted the Pacific motorcycle Grand Prix from 2000 to 2003 and the Japanese motorcycle Grand Prix since 2004.

== Other facilities ==
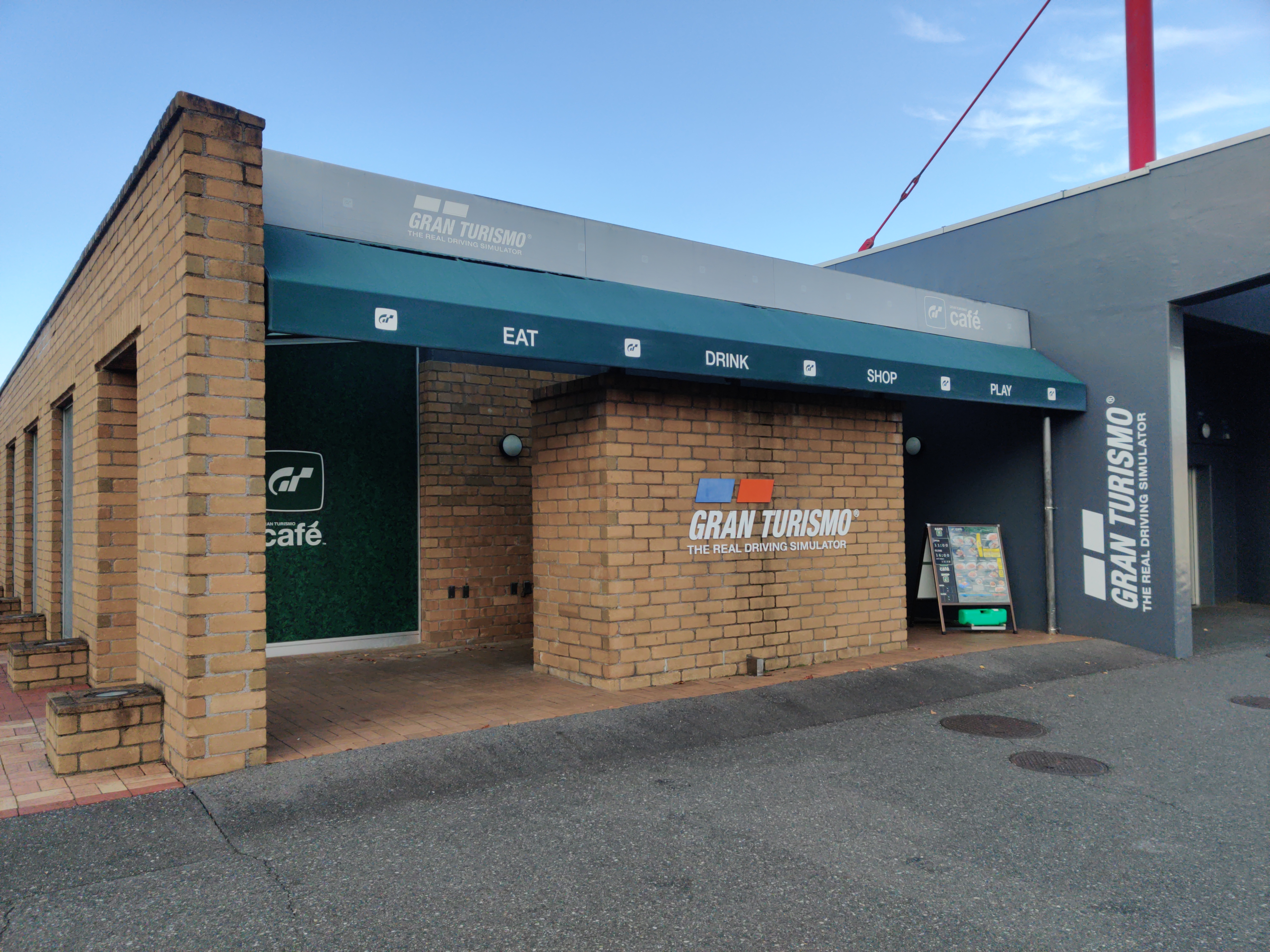
Gran Turismo cafe

In addition to the main racing complex, Mobility Resort Motegi features a second road course (called the "North Short Course") for karting and Formula 4 events, as well as a 0.250 mi (0.402 km) dirt track for modified and sprint car racing and also standard saloon racing. In addition, the FIM Trials series visits the track every year for the world trials championship. Therefore, an outdoor trials course exists on the facility.

Outside of racing, Mobility Resort Motegi has the Honda Collection Hall, which features historic Honda racing and production cars and motorcycles, and Honda Fan Fun Lab, which features Honda's next generation technologies such as robotics, fuel-cell vehicles and aviation. Honda also operates a technology demonstration center on the site, as well as educational centers.

In 2009, a cafe opened which was named after the Gran Turismo video games.

== Track difficulties ==
Mobility Resort Motegi is a separate-but-combined road-and-oval track (as opposed to the "roval" tracks common in the United States), and the decision to include a full road course contained largely within the oval necessitated design compromises. For spectators, sightlines can be extremely poor for road course races, as the grandstands are much further back than usual. The oval course blocks the view of much of the road course, thus several large-screen televisions are needed. Seating outside the grandstand is limited to areas of the infield and along the 750 m (820 yd) backstraight of the road course.

Track access is a major concern, with only two entry and exit points by a two-lane public road. Motegi is not a particularly large town, and accommodation is virtually non-existent close to the track, except for the on-site hotel. Train links to the area are extremely limited (the major regional lines, JR East and Tobu Railway do not service the area), nor has a planned superhighway been completed. Thus the stated track capacity (about 65,000) is dictated largely by traffic flow, not by actual seating capacity (estimated to be nearly 100,000 for road-course events, 80,000 for the oval).

In 2011, Casey Stoner and Jorge Lorenzo proposed to boycott the MotoGP race out of fears for their health from radiation from the Fukushima Daiichi Nuclear Power Plant even though all the independent scientific experts including the World Health Organization and Australian Radiation Protection and Nuclear Safety Agency had stated that it is safe to live permanently 80 km (50 mi) or more from the plant. Motegi is more than 120 km (75 mi) from Fukushima Daiichi Nuclear Power Plant. In the end, all the teams showed up for the race.

== Layout configurations ==
Mobility Resort Motegi layout configurations
Map of both road courses and speedway

Speedway (1997–2026)

Grand Prix Circuit (1997–present)

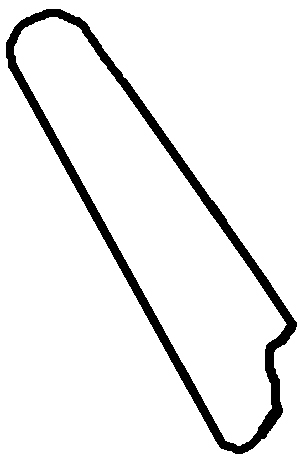
West Road Course (1997–present)

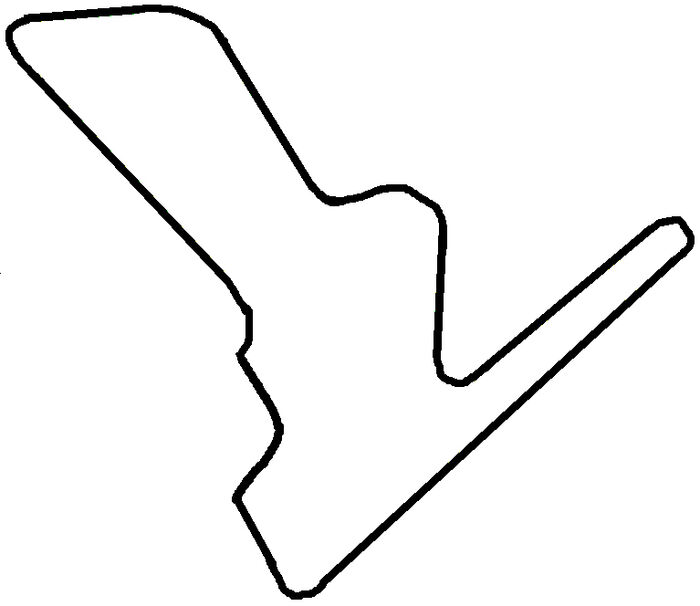
East Road Course (1997–present)

== Events ==
Current

- March: Super Taikyu
- April: Super Formula Championship, MFJ Superbikes
- May: Ferrari Challenge Japan
- June: Asia Road Racing Championship, Formula Regional Japanese Championship
- August: MFJ Superbikes
- September: Super Formula Lights
- October: Grand Prix motorcycle racing Japanese motorcycle Grand Prix, Moto4 Asia Cup
- November: Super GT, F4 Japanese Championship

Future

- Japan Cup Series (2023, 2027)

Former

- Champ Car
  - Bridgestone Potenza 500 (1998–2002)
- Coca-Cola 500 (1998)
- Ferrari Challenge Asia-Pacific (2019)
- Formula Challenge Japan (2006–2013)
- Formula Dream (1999–2003)
- Formula Toyota (2002–2007)
- GC-21 (2004)
- Grand Prix motorcycle racing
  - Pacific motorcycle Grand Prix (2000–2003)
- GT World Challenge Asia (2023)
- IndyCar Series
  - Indy Japan 300 (2003–2011)
- Japan Le Mans Challenge (2006–2007)
- Japanese Formula 3 Championship (1997–2019)
- Japanese Touring Car Championship (1998)
- NASCAR Winston West Series (1999)
- Porsche Carrera Cup Asia (2025)
- Porsche Carrera Cup Japan (2004, 2006–2007, 2010–2012, 2020)
- TCR Japan Touring Car Series (2020–2024)
- World Touring Car Championship
  - FIA WTCC Race of Japan (2015–2017)

== Lap records ==
The unofficial all-time track record is 1:29.757, set by Tomoki Nojiri during the qualifying session of 2021 2nd Motegi Super Formula round. As of November 2026, the fastest official race lap records at the Mobility Resort Motegi are listed as:

Category	Time	Driver	Vehicle	Event
Grand Prix Circuit (1997–present): 4.801 km (2.983 mi)
Super Formula	1:31.379	Sena Sakaguchi	Dallara SF23	2026 Motegi Super Formula round
Formula Nippon	1:34.853	Masami Kageyama	Reynard 97D	1997 Motegi Formula Nippon round
Super GT (GT500)	1:38.080	Tomoki Nojiri	Honda HRC Prelude-GT	2026 Motegi GT 250 km Race Grand Final
IndyCar	1:40.2453	Giorgio Pantano	Dallara IR-05	2011 Indy Japan: The Final
MotoGP	1:43.041	Enea Bastianini	KTM RC16	2026 Japanese motorcycle Grand Prix
Super Formula Lights	1:43.537	Yuto Nomura	Dallara 324	2025 Motegi Super Formula Lights round
LMP900	1:43.686	Hiroki Katoh	Zytek 04S	2006 Motegi JLMC round
Formula Three	1:44.373	Sho Tsuboi	Dallara F317	2018 Motegi Japanese F3 round
LMP1	1:44.508	Shinji Nakano	Courage LC70	2007 Motegi JLMC round
Super GT (GT300)	1:46.621	Ryuichiro Tomita	Nissan Fairlady Z GT300 (RZ34)	2026 Motegi GT 250 km Race Grand Final
Superbike	1:47.324	Katsuyuki Nakasuga	Yamaha YZF-R1	2024 1st Motegi All Japan Road Race Championship round
Moto2	1:47.479	Celestino Vietti	Boscoscuro B-26	2026 Japanese motorcycle Grand Prix
Formula Regional	1:47.881	Sena Sakaguchi	Dome F111/3	2020 Motegi FRJC round
Ferrari Challenge	1:50.274	Yamatatsu	Ferrari 296 Challenge	2026 Motegi Ferrari Challenge Japan round
500cc	1:50.591	Valentino Rossi	Honda NSR500	2000 Pacific motorcycle Grand Prix
250cc	1:51.412	Álvaro Bautista	Aprilia RSV 250	2008 Japanese motorcycle Grand Prix
GT3	1:51.770	James Yu	Audi R8 LMS GT3 Evo II	2023 Motegi GT World Challenge Asia round
Formula Challenge Japan	1:52.796	Mitsunori Takaboshi	Tatuus FC106	2012 Motegi Formula Challenge Japan round
Supersport	1:52.900	Keito Abe	Yamaha YZF-R6	2024 1st Motegi All Japan Road Race Championship round
LMP2	1:53.558	Shinsuke Yamazaki	Dallara GC21	2006 Motegi JLMC round
Formula Dream	1:53.798	Hideki Mutoh	Dome FD	2003 1st Motegi Formula Dream round
Porsche Carrera Cup	1:53.829	Ryo Ogawa	Porsche 911 (991 II) GT3 Cup	2020 Motegi Porsche Carrera Cup Japan round
GT1 (GTS)	1:54.200	Seicho Fujii	Ferrari 550 Maranello GTS	2007 Motegi JLMC round
Moto3	1:54.710	Brian Uriarte	KTM RC250GP	2026 Japanese motorcycle Grand Prix
Formula 4	1:55.178	Ryo Shirasaki	Toray Carbon Magic MCSC-24	2026 Motegi Japanese F4 round
Formula Toyota	1:55.214	Hideto Yasuoka	Tom's FT30	2004 Motegi Formula Toyota round
GT2	1:56.453	Tomonobu Fujii	Ferrari F430 GTC	2009 250 km of Motegi
TC1	1:57.136	Gabriele Tarquini	Honda Civic WTCC	2015 FIA WTCC Race of Japan
125cc	1:57.666	Mika Kallio	KTM 125 FRR	2006 Japanese motorcycle Grand Prix
GT	1:58.315	Atsushi Yogou	Porsche 911 (996) GT3-R	2000 Motegi JGTC round
TCR Touring Car	1:59.720	Choi Jeong Weon	Hyundai Elantra N TCR	2024 3rd Motegi TCR Japan round
500cc	2:02.889	Mick Doohan	Honda NSR500	1999 Japanese motorcycle Grand Prix
GT4	2.03.040	Manabu Orido	BMW M4 GT4 Gen II	2023 Motegi GT World Challenge Asia round
Asia Productions 250	2:07.132	Candra H	Yamaha YZF-R3	2025 Motegi ARRC round
Super 2000	2:07.456	Eric Kwong	SEAT León 2.0T	2016 Motegi Touring Car Series in Asia round
Asia Underbone 150	2:15.928	Murobbil Vittoni	Yamaha MX King 150	2024 Motegi ARRC round
East Road Course (1997–present): 3.400 km (2.113 mi)
Formula Dream	1:22.447	Yasuhiro Takahashi	Dome FD	2003 2nd Motegi Formula Dream round
LMP2	1:31.012	Hiromi Sagami	Dallara GC21	2004 1st Motegi GC-21 round
West Road Course (1997–present): 1.400 km (0.870 mi)
Super Touring	0:38.325	Hironori Takeuchi	Toyota Chaser	1998 Motegi JTCC round
Speedway (1997–2026): 2.493 km (1.549 mi)
CART	0:25.830	Hélio Castroneves	Lola B99/00	1999 Firestone Firehawk 500K
IndyCar	0:27.0977	Tomas Scheckter	G-Force GF09	2003 Indy Japan 300
NASCAR Winston Cup Series	0:35.2298 (Note: The lap time was found by dividing the track length by the speed written in the reference.)	Jeff Gordon	Chevrolet Monte Carlo NASCAR	1998 Coca-Cola 500
Speedway with 2 Chicanes (1997): 2.493 km (1.549 mi)
JGTC (GT500)	0:47.685	Aguri Suzuki	Nissan Skyline GT-R (BCNR33)	1997 Nicos Cup GT Allstar Race

== In popular media ==
As a large recently constructed Japanese circuit, Mobility Resort Motegi has and continues to be utilised virtually in a large number of electronic video games, both in arcade machines and in PC and console games for home use.

- In Honda's 2005 Clio Awards winning commercial "Impossible Dream", the sequence in which the BAR Formula One car is driven into the bridge was filmed at the circuit.
- During the opening sequence of Kamen Rider Agito, the three main Kamen Riders are shown riding around the circuit, as Honda is the series sponsor.
- During the ending sequence of Engine Sentai Go-onger, the series' characters are shown dancing on the main straight of the road course. The racetrack is revealed in the series as the primary Go-onger team's origin (it is known that Saki Rouyama, Go-on Yellow, works there), and was used (along with the Honda Collection Hall) in the final scene from "Road Of Justice", the final episode of the series.
- In Super Hero Taisen GP: Kamen Rider 3, a race called the Rider Grand Prix took place in a variation of the Twin Ring Motegi, owned by Shocker in the altered timeline.
- The track is available in racing games such as Forza Motorsport 2, Forza Motorsport 3, Forza Motorsport 4, Gran Turismo 4, Gran Turismo (PSP), Gran Turismo 5, Gran Turismo 6, iRacing.com, and RaceRoom Racing Experience.
- During the first tankery battle in Girls und Panzer Das Finale Part 1, Ooarai Girls Academy against BC Freedom High School, members of Leopon Team, the VK 4501 (P) reference the track, saying they wished they re-opened the oval layout.

== See also ==
- Suzuka Circuit, another Honda-owned track operated by Honda Mobilityland, which was built in 1962 and hosts the FIA Formula One Japanese Grand Prix.
- Fuji Speedway, a road track originally conceived as a high speed oval, and former host to the Japanese Grand Prix, current host of the FIA World Endurance Championship 6 Hours of Fuji.

=== Access ===
Bus routes

- JR Bus Kanto
  - For Utsunomiya Station via Motegi Station
- Ibaraki Kotsu
  - For Mito Station (Ibaraki)
